= La Franja =

Catalan-speaking part of Aragon, Spain

La Franja (Catalan pronunciation: [la ˈfɾandʒɛ]; "The Strip"; Aragonese: Francha) is the area of Catalan-speaking territories of eastern Aragon bordering Catalonia, in Spain. It literally means "the strip" and can also more properly be called Franja d'Aragó (Aragonese Strip), Franja de Ponent (Western Strip) or Franja Oriental d'Aragó (Eastern Strip of Aragon) in Catalan (in Aragonese: Francha Oriental d'Aragón, "Eastern Strip of Aragon"; or simply Francha de Lebán/Levant, "Eastern Strip", or Francha d'Aragón, "Aragonese Strip"; in Spanish: Franja de Aragón, "Aragonese Strip").

La Franja is usually considered to be comprised by a part of the municipalities of the following Aragonese administrative comarcas: la Ribagorza/Ribagorça, La Litera/La Llitera, Bajo Cinca/Baix Cinca, Bajo Aragón-Caspe/Baix Aragó-Casp, Bajo Aragón/Baix Aragó and Matarraña/Matarranya.

La Franja has been part of Aragon since the medieval kingdom of Aragon; never in its history has it been part of Catalonia; however its population speaks in Catalan, presumably since the Middle Ages; consequently this territory is considered a part of the so-called Catalan Countries.

Among the territories where Catalan is spoken (Catalonia, the Valencian Community, the Balearic Islands, Andorra and Roussillon, among some other little territories), La Franja is currently the one where oral knowledge of Catalan is the most universal; this is due to low immigration to the area compared to the other ones. Roughly 80% of adults can speak Catalan. In all of Aragon there are 55,513 speakers of Catalan, according to census data.

The thin strip of land is very diverse geographically, ranging from valleys in the Pyrenees to the flat lands by the Ebro; all are included under this umbrella term. La Franja does not have any official political recognition within Aragon, nor is it a separate historical entity in and of itself; the territories only have in common being administratively and historically Aragonese and linguistically Catalan. The term is mostly used in the neighbouring Catalonia, especially by Catalan nationalists, though it has lately become common in Aragon too. Some right-wing political forces in Aragon prefer not to use the word Catalan when speaking of the language of eastern Aragon, and have used a number of alternative names for it, even in the Language Act of Aragon of 2013.

== Origin of the names that refer to La Franja ==
The use of a term to refer to the eastern area of Aragon bordering Catalonia as based on linguistic criteria is recent. It was in 1929—when he christened these as Marques de Ponent, "Western Marches"— that Catalan geographer Pau Vila used for the first time a term designating jointly the Aragonese area where Catalan is spoken.

This term was maintained in the second half of the 20th century by Catalan linguists such as Joan Giraldo, along with other terms such as Marques d'Aragó (in Spanish, Marcas de Aragón, "Marches of Aragon"), Catalunya aragonesa (in Spanish, Cataluña aragonesa, "Aragonese Catalonia") or la ratlla d'Aragó (in Spanish, la raya de Aragón, "the Aragonese Strip").

Whichever term is used, they all refer to the eastern Catalan-speaking area of Aragon, which borders western Catalonia. These terms all originated in Catalonia but later became popular in La Franja itself. They are therefore Catalonia-centered and hence the Ponent ("Western") reference in the term La Franja del Ponent, because these areas lie to the west of Catalonia.

The term Franja de Ponent itself first appeared in the second half of the 1970s, during the Spanish transition to democracy:

the name in question is the collective creation of a group of Catalan-speaking Aragonese and Catalans from the Principality (Catalonia), interested in the fact that a part of Aragon is Catalan-speaking, who used to meet some Saturday evenings at the Centro Comarcal Leridano (CCL) premises in Barcelona during the first years of the transition, and, simultaneously, it was also the creation of some original and small local groups –which were often joined by those CCL members– which emerged in La Litera in defense of the cultural-linguistic identity of the comarca.

At the Second International Congress of the Catalan Language (Segon Congrés Internacional de la Llengua Catalana) held in 1985, the normative authority on the Catalan language, known as Institut d'Estudis Catalans, adopted Franja d'Aragó ("Aragonese Strip") as the denomination for the Catalan-speaking territories of Aragon for academic and linguistic purposes, while the denomination Franja de Ponent ("Western Strip") is used mainly in the political arena by some associations, groups and political parties associated with pancatalanism.

Later on, alternative denominations such as Aragón Oriental (in Catalan, Aragó Oriental), Franja Oriental or Franja de Levante (in Catalan, Franja de Llevant), all meaning roughly Eastern Aragon or Eastern Strip were created in Aragon.

Languages of Aragon Catalan

== Diverse meanings ==
While the term was created to designate a linguistic area, there are other issues in question:

- The ecclesiastical sense
- The linguistic sense
- The political sense
- The socioeconomic sense

=== Ecclesiastical sense ===
Many parishes of what is now called la Franja had been historically part of the Diocese of Lleida, along with other, non-Catalan-speaking Aragonese towns. In 1995, Catholic church authorities, through the Papal Nuncio to Spain, informed the president of the Spanish Episcopal Conference –Archbishop of Saragossa, Elías Yanes– of the decision of the Holy See to align the diocesan boundaries with the political and historical ones.

This meant that 111 parishes and a population of 68,089 were transferred from the Diocese of Lleida to the enlarged Diocese of Barbastro, whose name was then changed to Diocese of Barbastro-Monzón As for the reasons of the transfer, some Catalan ecclesiastical ranks considered that it was a result of the opposition of these Aragonese parishes to a short-lived debate on the convenience of creating a distinct Catalan Episcopal Conference, which would have been detached from the Spanish one. Other sources claim that the diocese of Barbastro—birthplace of the founder of Opus Dei, Josepmaria Escrivà de Balaguer—was losing population and needed to acquire neighbouring parishes from another diocese to be able to continue to exist.

The transfer of the parishes, specifically the ownership of the medieval artistic objects or sacred art comprised, originated an intricate series of lawsuits involving both dioceses (Barbastro-Monzón and Lleida), both autonomous governments (Aragón and Catalonia) and both legal systems canon and administrative law.

It was finally decided by the ecclesiastic canon judges in 2005 that the 113 works of art belong to the Barbastro-Monzón diocese. The Lleida diocese released a statement accepting this decision but, at the same time, announced that then the administrative process would be opened, later on, it stated that talks should be opened to reach an agreement, in the end effectively protracting the end of the dispute. In the meantime, the works of art remain located in the Diocese Museum of Lleida. The lawsuit is known as the conflicto del patrimonio eclesiástico de la Franja (the conflict of the ecclesiastical heritage of the Franja) or del Aragón Oriental (of Eastern Aragon), and though it began as a local debate, it has become a national press story, especially due to the confrontation between the political forces of Aragon and Catalonia.

On July 1, 2008 an agreement between the two dioceses was announced, again stating that the art pieces would return to the Barbastro-Monzón diocese. However, the situation remained stalled due to the continued refusal of the Catalan administration to issue an exit permit, something which eventually led to the Aragonese region president to open a criminal procedure in February 2009, thus effectively giving up on the resolved yet stalled civil procedure. Then the Vatican itself urged the return of the pieces to Aragon, to no avail.

=== Linguistic sense ===
The Catalan language is spoken by a significant proportion of the population of La Franja (47.1% of the population uses it as their usual language according to a survey by the Aragonese Institute of Statistics in 2013; percentage that rises to 73.6%–90% according to two surveys carried out with a smaller territorial scope also in 2013 by the Generalitat of Catalonia) This despite the fact that it is not an official language and has a very limited presence in education (where it is only available as an elective) and in administration and or public acts, resulting in severe deficiencies in writing skills of this language.

==== Territorial basis ====
The exact territorial limits of the Franja de Aragón differ depending on the source, since there are some municipalities of Ribagorza where there are doubts over whether or not to include them as Catalan-speaking or as Aragonese-speaking. The proportion of speakers of the two languages varies over time and with immigration according to the municipality, something which leads to different sources drawing slightly different linguistic borders.

==== According to the draft of the Aragonese Language Law ====
During the fourth session of the Cortes de Aragón (the parliament of Aragon) (1995–1999) under the PP-PAR coalition government the Special Commission Report on the Language Policy of Aragon was published. The report would be the basis for the Draft of the Language Law of Aragon published the following session (1999–2003) under the PSOE-PAR coalition, where for the first time from the Cortes de Aragón would detail those municipalities which formed part of a Catalan-speaking community, with the aim of recognising co-officiality and encouraging the use of Catalan in public life and especially in education.

The law was never approved due to protests and petitions in Aragon opposed to the co-officiality of Catalan, promoted mainly by the Federación de Asociaciones Culturales del Aragón Oriental (FACAO), a conservative organisation which maintained that the local 'linguistic modalities' were languages and not dialects of Catalan, and there was lack of consensus on the issue among the Aragonese political parties. There are other civic associations staunchly rejecting the Catalan affiliation of the language

According to the list of municipalities which could be considered to be areas of predominant use of its own language or linguistic modality or areas of predominant use of normalised Catalan in the Second annex of the Second Final Disposition of the Avant-project of the Language Law, La Franja would be composed of:

| Municipality | Area (km^{2}) | Population (2006) | Comarca | Province |
|---|---|---|---|---|
| Aguaviva | 42.2 | 691 | Bajo Aragón | Teruel |
| Albelda | 51.9 | 892 | La Litera | Huesca |
| Alcampell | 58.0 | 827 | La Litera | Huesca |
| Altorricón | 32.4 | 1,469 | La Litera | Huesca |
| Arén | 119.3 | 337 | Ribagorza | Huesca |
| Arens de Lledó | 34.3 | 227 | Matarraña | Teruel |
| Azanuy-Alins | 51.2 | 173 | La Litera | Huesca |
| Baélls | 39.8 | 125 | La Litera | Huesca |
| Baldellou | 30.4 | 115 | La Litera | Huesca |
| Beceite | 96.7 | 598 | Matarraña | Teruel |
| Belmonte de San José | 34.0 | 144 | Bajo Aragón | Teruel |
| Benabarre | 157.1 | 1,160 | Ribagorza | Huesca |
| Bonansa | 37.3 | 101 | Ribagorza | Huesca |
| Calaceite | 81.3 | 1,143 | Matarraña | Teruel |
| Camporrélls | 26.7 | 217 | La Litera | Huesca |
| Castigaleu | 26.5 | 118 | Ribagorza | Huesca |
| Castillonroy | 37.6 | 391 | La Litera | Huesca |
| Cretas | 52.7 | 630 | Matarraña | Teruel |
| Estopiñán del Castillo | 88.7 | 199 | Ribagorza | Huesca |
| Fabara | 101.6 | 1,221 | Bajo Aragón-Caspe | Zaragoza |
| Fayón | 67.2 | 427 | Bajo Aragón-Caspe | Zaragoza |
| Fórnoles | 32.6 | 105 | Matarraña | Teruel |
| Fraga | 437.6 | 13,191 | Bajo Cinca | Huesca |
| Fuentespalda | 39.0 | 347 | Matarraña | Teruel |
| Isábena | 118.5 | 302 | Ribagorza | Huesca |
| La Cañada de Verich | 10.9 | 104 | Bajo Aragón | Teruel |
| La Cerollera | 33.7 | 121 | Bajo Aragón | Teruel |
| La Codoñera | 21.0 | 351 | Bajo Aragón | Teruel |
| La Fresneda | 39.5 | 462 | Matarraña | Teruel |
| La Ginebrosa | 80.1 | 239 | Bajo Aragón | Teruel |
| La Portellada | 21.4 | 274 | Matarraña | Teruel |
| Lascuarre | 31.9 | 147 | Ribagorza | Huesca |
| Laspaúles | 81.6 | 281 | Ribagorza | Huesca |
| Lledó | 15.6 | 181 | Matarraña | Teruel |
| Maella | 174.9 | 2,089 | Bajo Aragón-Caspe | Zaragoza |
| Mazaleón | 86.2 | 589 | Matarraña | Teruel |
| Mequinenza | 307.2 | 2,533 | Bajo Cinca | Zaragoza |
| Monesma y Cajigar | 62.6 | 111 | Ribagorza | Huesca |
| Monroyo | 79.2 | 307 | Matarraña | Teruel |
| Montanuy | 174.1 | 311 | Ribagorza | Huesca |
| Nonaspe | 111.4 | 1,055 | Bajo Aragón-Caspe | Zaragoza |
| Peñarroya de Tastavins | 83.3 | 488 | Matarraña | Teruel |
| Peralta de Calasanz | 114.9 | 261 | La Litera | Huesca |
| Puente de Montañana | 48.6 | 88 | Ribagorza | Huesca |
| Ráfales | 35.6 | 156 | Matarraña | Teruel |
| San Esteban de Litera | 71.9 | 512 | La Litera | Huesca |
| Sopeira | 44.1 | 102 | Ribagorza | Huesca |
| Tamarite de Litera | 110.6 | 3,678 | La Litera | Huesca |
| Tolva | 59.0 | 176 | Ribagorza | Huesca |
| Torre de Arcas | 34.3 | 93 | Matarraña | Teruel |
| Torre del Compte | 19.5 | 168 | Matarraña | Teruel |
| Torre la Ribera | 32.1 | 118 | Ribagorza | Huesca |
| Torrente de Cinca | 56.8 | 1,084 | Bajo Cinca | Huesca |
| Torrevelilla | 33.4 | 204 | Bajo Aragón | Teruel |
| Valdeltormo | 16.0 | 349 | Matarraña | Teruel |
| Valderrobres | 124.0 | 2,142 | Matarraña | Teruel |
| Valjunquera | 41.8 | 414 | Matarraña | Teruel |
| Velilla de Cinca | 16.5 | 469 | Bajo Cinca | Huesca |
| Vencillón | 10.4 | 471 | La Litera | Huesca |
| Beranuy | 63.8 | 111 | Ribagorza | Huesca |
| Viacamp y Litera | 107.7 | 25 | Ribagorza | Huesca |
| Zaidín | 92.6 | 1,822 | Bajo Cinca | Huesca |
| 62 municipalities of Aragon | 4,442.8 | 47,236 | | |

==== According to the Institut d'Estudis Catalans ====
From the point of view of the Institut d'Estudis Catalans the territory is smaller, due to the fact that the municipality of Torre la Ribera is not considered Catalan-speaking, and the municipalities of Azanuy-Alins, Isábena, Lascuarre and San Esteban de Litera are classified as transitional dialects. The Catalan-speaking lands are thus reduced to a total of 57 municipalities with an area of 4,137.2 km^{2} with a population of 45,984.

==== According to the Gran Enciclopedia Aragonesa ====
The situation is reversed according to the Gran Enciclopedia Aragonesa (GEA) with the Franja having an area of 5,370 km^{2} and with a population of 70,000. It should be mentioned that the GEA does not recognise the denomination Franja but discusses its situation under Catalan in Aragon, nor does it specify in how many or which municipalities Catalan is definitively spoken nor the date of the census on which its figures are based.

==== According to the Gran Geografia Comarcal of the GREC ====
| Municipality/Urban nucleus | Area (km^{2}) | Population (2006) |
|---|---|---|
| Benasque | 233.6 | 2,045 |
| Bisaurri | 62.9 | 247 |
| Castejón de Sos | 31.8 | 733 |
| Chía | 26.1 | 113 |
| Güell (1) | 28.0 | 29 |
| Laguarres (2) | 33.0 | 71 |
| Sahún | 72.9 | 331 |
| Sesué | 5.2 | 125 |
| Torres del Obispo (3) | 32.0 | 163 |
| Valle de Lierp | 32.8 | 47 |
| Villanova | 6,9 | 154 |
| 8 municipalities and 3 nuclei | 565.2 | 4,058 |
| Franja de Aragon according to the Commission report | 4.442,8 | 47,236 |
| Total 70 municipalities y 3 nuclei according to the GREC | 5.008,0 | 51,294 |

The Gran Geografia Comarcal of the Grup Enciclopèdia Catalana (GREC) classes the territorial area of the Franja de Aragon as larger than that defined by the Commission report although not as large as the GEA definition. All the municipalities which it adds to those of the Avant-project and of Ribagorza and therefore belong to the Province of Huesca. It adds a total of eight municipalities and three population nuclei; Güell, Laguarres y Torres del Obispo, which form part of two municipalities; Graus in the case of the first and the third, and Capella the case of the second. The table to the right details the population nuclei and official area and population figures.

- (1) Population centres belonging to the municipality of Graus. Population figures according to Ayuntamiento (no date given), area according to GREC.net.
- (2) Population centres belonging to the municipality of Capella. Population 2004, area according to GREC.net.
- (3) Population centres belonging to the municipality of Graus. Population according to Ayuntamiento (no date given), area according to GREC.net.

==== Comparative table and map according to sources ====
| Source | Nº munici- palities | % of Aragon | Area (km^{2}) | % of Aragon | Population (2006) | % of Aragon |
|---|---|---|---|---|---|---|
| Avant-project of the Language Law | 62 | 8.5 | 4,442.8 | 9.3 | 47,236 | 3.7 |
| Institut d'Estudis; Catalans (IEC) | 57 | 7.8 | 4,137.2 | 8.3 | 45,984 | 3.6 |
| Gran Enciclopedia; Aragonesa (GEA) | ? | - | 5,370.0 | 11.3 | 70,000 | 5.5 |
| Grupo Enciclopedia; Catalana (GREC) | 70 | 9.6 | 5,008.0 | 10.5 | 51,294 | 4.0 |
| Total Aragon | 730 | 100.0 | 47,719.2 | 100.0 | 1,277,471 | 100.0 |

==== Toponymy ====
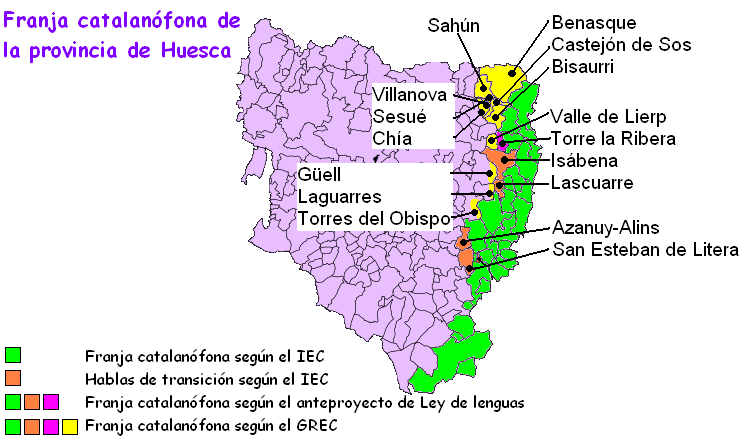
Variations in the Catalan-speaking municipalities of Huesca

There is no unitary policy on official toponymy in the Franja, leading to great variations between the local comarcalización laws as compared to those proposed by the IEC. The following table details the translation of the toponymy in Spanish to the official version in the local vernacular and that proposed by the IEC. At the bottom are the municipalities which the GREC includes in its definition of the Franja and the proposed names which it offers opposed to the official names:

| Spanish (1) | Local variety or linguistic vernacular according to the comarcalización law (1) | Catalan according to the IEC (2) |
|---|---|---|
| Aguaviva | Aiguaviva de Bergantes | Aiguaviva de Bergantes |
| Albelda | Albelda | Albelda |
| Alcampell | El Campell | El Campell |
| Altorricón | El Torricó | El Torricó |
| Arén | Areny | Areny de Noguera |
| Arens de Lledó | Arenys de Lledó | Arenys de Lledó |
| Azanuy-Alins | Azanúy-Alins | Sanui i Alins |
| Baélls | Baells | Baells |
| Baldellou | Valdellou | Valdellou |
| Beceite | Beseit | Beseit |
| Belmonte de San José | Bellmunt de Mesquí | Bellmunt de Mesquí |
| Benabarre | Benavarri | Benavarri |
| Bonansa | Bonansa | Bonansa |
| Calaceite | Calaceit | Calaceit |
| Camporrélls | Camporrells | Camporrells |
| Castigaleu | Castigaleu | Castigaleu |
| Castillonroy | Castellonroi | Castellonroi |
| Cretas | Queretes | Cretes |
| Estopiñán del Castillo | Estopanyà | Estopanyà |
| Fabara | Favara | Favara de Matarranya |
| Fayón | Faió | Faió |
| Fórnoles | Fórnols | Fórnols de Matarranya |
| Fraga | Fraga | Fraga |
| Fuentespalda | Fontdespatla | Fondespatla |
| Isábena | Isàvena | Isàvena |
| La Cañada de Verich | La Canyada de Beric | La Canyada de Beric |
| La Cerollera | La Cerollera | La Sorollera |
| La Codoñera | La Codonyera | La Codonyera |
| La Fresneda | La Freixneda | La Freixneda |
| La Ginebrosa | La Ginebrosa | La Ginebrosa |
| La Portellada | La Portellada | La Portellada |
| Lascuarre | Lascuarre | Lasquarri |
| Laspaúles | Laspaúls | Les Paüls |
| Lledó | Lledó | Lledó d'Algars |
| Maella | Maella | Maella |
| Mazaleón | Massalió | Massalió |
| Mequinenza | Mequinensa | Mequinensa |
| Monesma y Cajigar | Monesma i Caixigar | Monesma i Queixigar |
| Monroyo | Montroig | Mont-roig de Tastavins |
| Montanuy | Montanui | Montanui |
| Nonaspe | Nonasp | Nonasp |
| Peñarroya de Tastavins | Pena-roja de Tastavins | Pena-roja |
| Peralta de Calasanz | Peralta de Calassanç | Peralta de Calassanç |
| Puente de Montañana | El Pont de Montanyana | El Pont de Montanyana |
| Ráfales | Ràfels | Ràfels |
| San Esteban de Litera | San Esteban de Litera | Sant Esteve de Llitera |
| Sopeira | Sopeira | Sopeira |
| Tamarite de Litera | Tamarit de Llitera | Tamarit de Llitera |
| Tolva | Tolba | Tolba |
| Torre de Arcas | Torredarques | Torredarques |
| Torre del Compte | La Torre del Comte | La Torre del Comte |
| Torre la Ribera | Torre la Ribera | Tor-la-ribera |
| Torrente de Cinca | Torrent de Cinca | Torrent de Cinca |
| Torrevelilla | La Torre de Vilella | La Torre de Vilella |
| Valdeltormo | La Vall del Tormo | La Vall de Tormo |
| Valderrobres | Vall de Roures | Vall-de-roures |
| Valjunquera | Valljunquera | Valljunquera |
| Velilla de Cinca | Villella de Cinca | Vilella de Cinca |
| Vencillón | Vensilló | Vensilló |
| Veracruz | Veracruz | Beranui |
| Viacamp y Litera | Viacamp i Lliterà | Viacamp |
| Zaidín | Saidí | Saidí |
| | | Catalan according to the GREC (3) |
| Benasque | Benás | Benasc |
| Bisaurri | Bisaurri | Bissaürri |
| Castejón de Sos | Castilló de Sos | Castilló de Sos |
| Chía | Chía | Gia |
| Sahún | Sahún | Saünc |
| Sesué | Sesué | Sessué |
| Valle de Lierp | Valle de Lierp | La Vall de Lierp |
| Villanova | Billanoba | Vilanova d'Éssera |

- (1) Sources of the official denominations in Spanish and local vernacular:

Boletín Oficial de Aragón (BOA): Ley 10/2002, de 03 de mayo, de creación de la comarca del Bajo Aragón / Ley 12/2003, de 24 de marzo, de creación de la comarca del Bajo Aragón-Caspe / Ley 20/2002, de 07 de octubre, de creación de la comarca del Bajo Cinca / Ley 25/2002, de 12 de noviembre, de creación de la comarca de La Litera / Ley 07/2002, de 15 de abril, de creación de la comarca del Matarraña / Ley 12/2002, de 28 de mayo, de creación de la comarca de la Ribagorza.

- (2) Source of the denominations in Catalan according to the Institut d'Estudis Catalans (IEC):

Lista de denominaciones en catalán aprobada por la Sección Filológica del IEC en reunión del día 15 de diciembre de de 1995, en la reunión de la Sección Filológica de 15 de enero de 1999 se decidió incluir en la lista el topónimo "Vensilló" al ser un municipio de nueva creación. En la primera reunión los municipios de Azanuy-Alins, Isábena, Lascuarre y San Esteban de Litera se excluyeron de la lista oficial de municipios de lengua catalana de la Franja de Aragón, listándose a parte como municipios pertenecientes a un área de transición lingüística.

- (3) Source of the denominations in Catalan according to the Grupo Enciclopedia Catalana:

=== Political sense ===
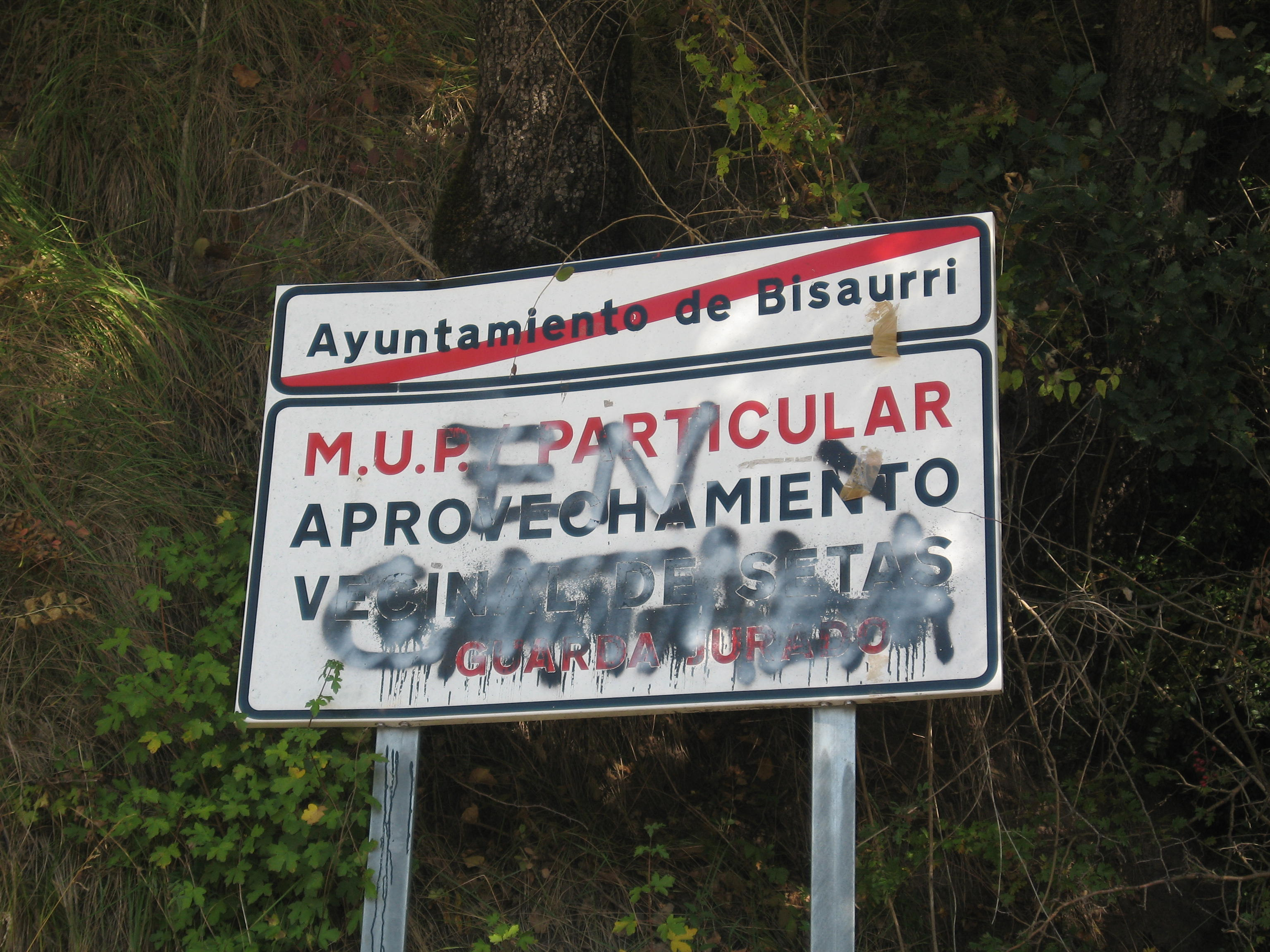
A graffiti on a road sign in Bisaurri. The road sign is written in Spanish and the graffiti says "En català" (In Catalan)

The political significance of La Franja goes hand in hand with the Catalan nationalist political movement, which considers this part of Aragon (and even all other Catalan-speaking territories) to be part of the Catalan nation, because of its language.

This new interpretation as part of the political connotation ascribed to the Catalan Countries emerged throughout the 20th century—and especially after the 1960s—encouraged in the main part by the Valencian Joan Fuster. Pan-Catalanism demands the creation of a nation-state for the Catalan Countries in which the cultural unity is based on the Catalan linguistic community.

In the Franja itself, there has never been a political movement promoting union with Catalonia or separation from Aragon. On the other hand, Catalan political parties do not participate in municipal or regional elections in the area.

=== Socioeconomic sense ===
The socioeconomic meaning of the Franja relates to the economic region surrounding the Catalan city of Lleida, which encompasses Catalan-speaking Huescan and Zaragozan municipalities and excludes those in the region of Teruel and includes Spanish-speaking municipalities such as Alcolea de Cinca, Binéfar, and Monzón.The area of influence of Lleida is especially reflected in editions of the local Lleida press for example La Mañana-Franja de Ponent and also of Aragon as shown by the digital publication Franja Digital.

== See also ==
- Ilercavonia
- Lower Aragon
- Roman Catholic Diocese of Lleida
