= Nonaspe =

Nonaspe/Nonasp
- municipality
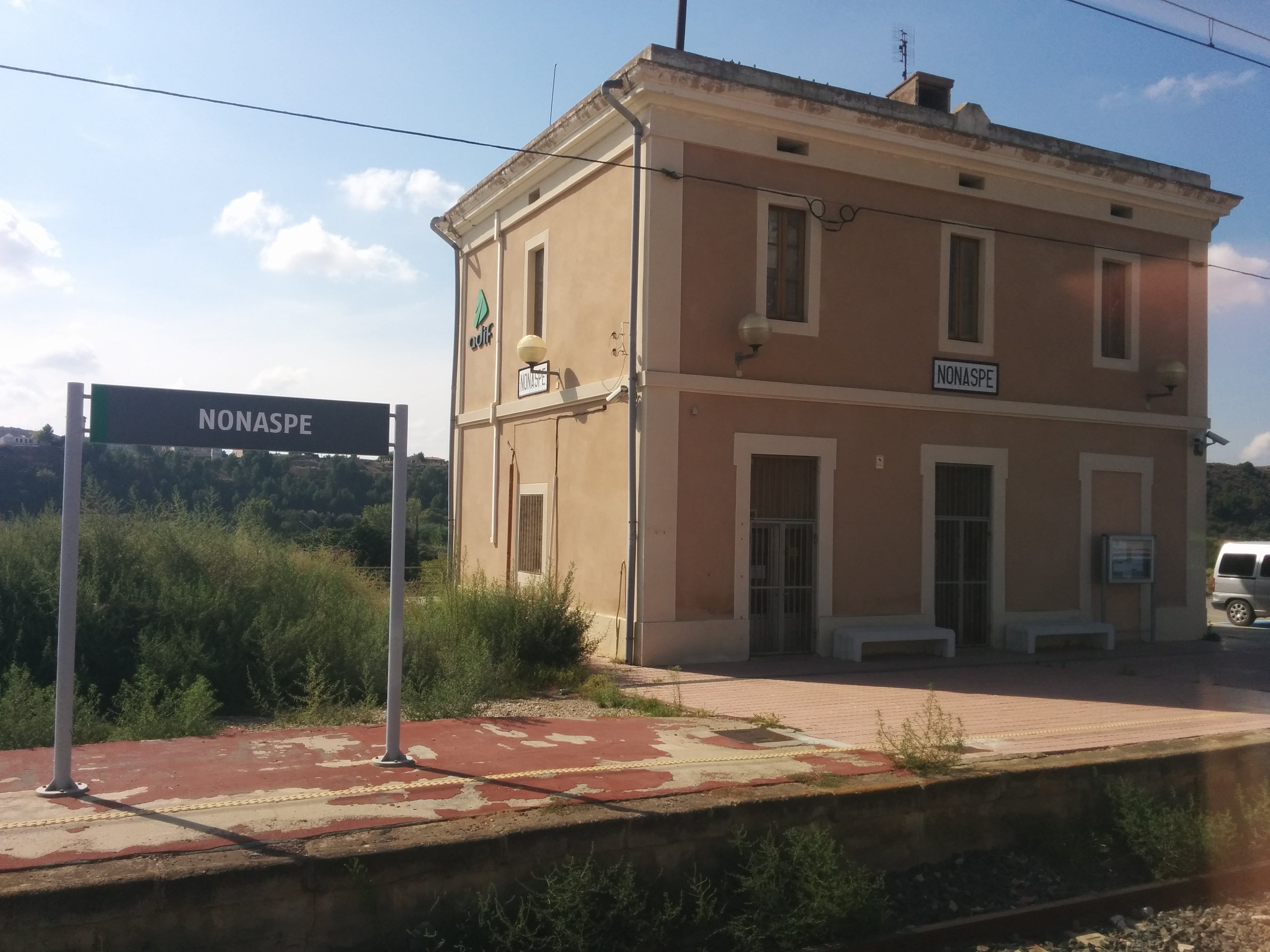

- Flag Coat of arms

- Location within Aragon Location within Spain Location within Europe
- Country: Spain
- Autonomous community: Aragon
- Province: Zaragoza

Area
  - Total: 111 km^{2} (43 sq mi)

Population (2025-01-01)
  - Total: 997
  - Density: 8.98/km^{2} (23.3/sq mi)
- Time zone: UTC+1 (CET)
  - Summer (DST): UTC+2 (CEST)

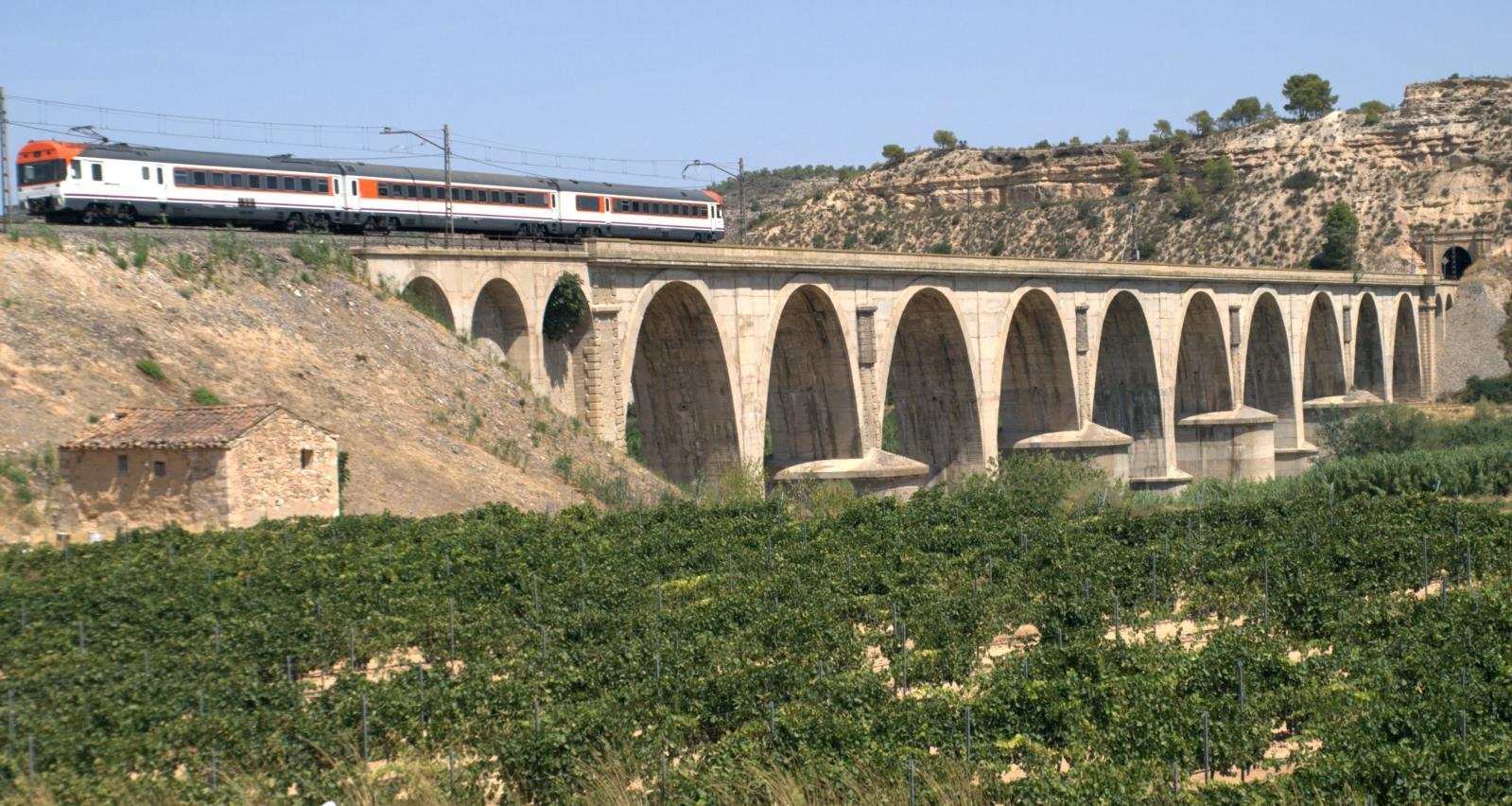
Railway bridge in Nonaspe

Nonaspe (Spanish: [noˈnaspe]) or Nonasp (Catalan: [noˈnasp]) is a municipality located in the province of Saragossa, Aragon, Spain. According to the 2004 census (INE), the municipality has a population of 1,042 inhabitants. This town is located in La Franja, the local dialect is a variant of Catalan.

Historically this town and its municipal term were considered part of the Matarranya, but presently it is included in the Bajo Aragón-Caspe/Baix Aragó-Casp comarca.

== See also ==
- Bajo Aragón-Caspe/Baix Aragó-Casp
- Matarraña/Matarranya
- La Franja
- List of municipalities in Zaragoza
