= Baélls =

Coordinates: 41°57′N 0°27′E

Baélls/Baells
- municipality
- Interactive map of Baélls/Baells
- Country: Spain
- Autonomous community: Aragon
- Province: Huesca
- Municipality: Baélls/Baells

Area
  - Total: 39 km^{2} (15 sq mi)

Population (2025-01-01)
  - Total: 89
  - Density: 2.3/km^{2} (5.9/sq mi)
- Time zone: UTC+1 (CET)
  - Summer (DST): UTC+2 (CEST)

Baélls (Spanish: [baˈels]) or Baells (Catalan: [baˈeʎs]) is a municipality located in the province of Huesca, Aragon, Spain. According to the 2004 census (INE), the municipality has a population of 134 inhabitants.

== See also ==
- List of municipalities in Huesca
