= Torre de Arcas =

Torre de Arcas/Torredarques
- municipality
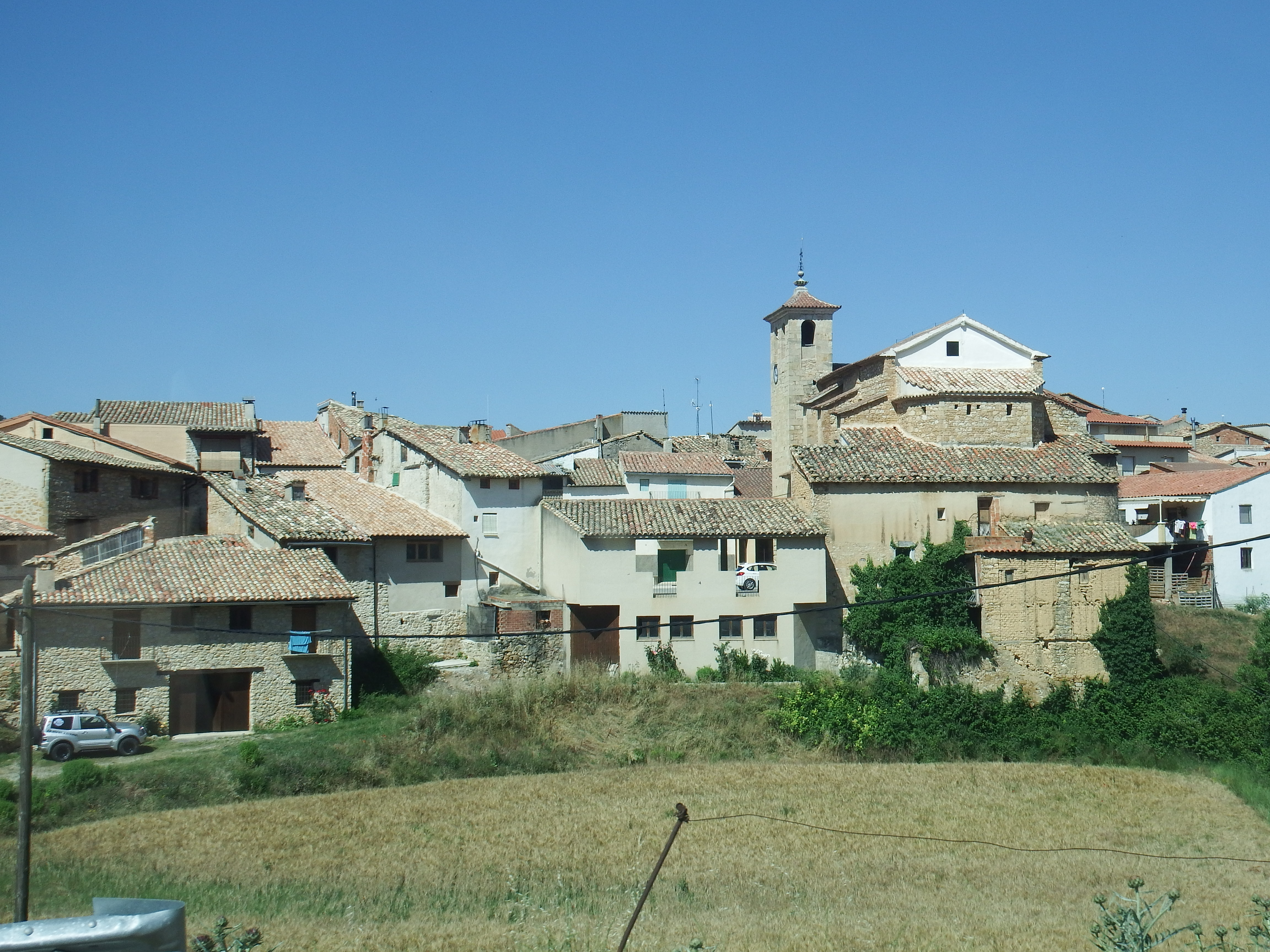

- Coat of arms

- Location of Torre de Arcas/Torredarques within Aragon Location of Torre de Arcas/Torredarques within Spain
- Coordinates: 40°45′N 0°4′W
- Country: Spain
- Autonomous community: Aragon
- Province: Teruel
- Municipality: Torre de Arcas/Torredarques

Area
  - Total: 34.41 km^{2} (13.29 sq mi)
- Elevation: 945 m (3,100 ft)

Population (2025-01-01)
  - Total: 76
  - Density: 2.2/km^{2} (5.7/sq mi)
- Time zone: UTC+1 (CET)
  - Summer (DST): UTC+2 (CEST)

Torre de Arcas (Spanish: [ˈtore ðe ˈaɾkas]) or Torredarques (Catalan: [ˌtoreˈðaɾkes]) is a municipality located in the Matarraña/Matarranya comarca, province of Teruel, Aragon, Spain. According to the 2004 census (INE), the municipality has a population of 99 inhabitants.

== See also ==
- List of municipalities in Teruel
