= Vencillón =

Coordinates: 41.705°N 0.323889°E

Vencillón/Vensilló
- Flag Coat of arms
- Interactive map of Vencillón/Vensilló
- Country: Spain
- Autonomous community: Aragon
- Province: Huesca
- Municipality: Vencillón/Vensilló

Area
  - Total: 15 km^{2} (5.8 sq mi)
- Elevation: 210 m (690 ft)

Population (2025-01-01)
  - Total: 402
  - Density: 27/km^{2} (69/sq mi)
- Time zone: UTC+1 (CET)
  - Summer (DST): UTC+2 (CEST)

Vencillón (Spanish: [benθiˈʎon]) or Vensilló (Catalan: [bensiˈʎo]) is a municipality located in the province of Huesca, Aragon, Spain. According to the 2004 census (INE), the municipality has a population of 446 inhabitants.

It has two official names: Vencillón and Vensilló.

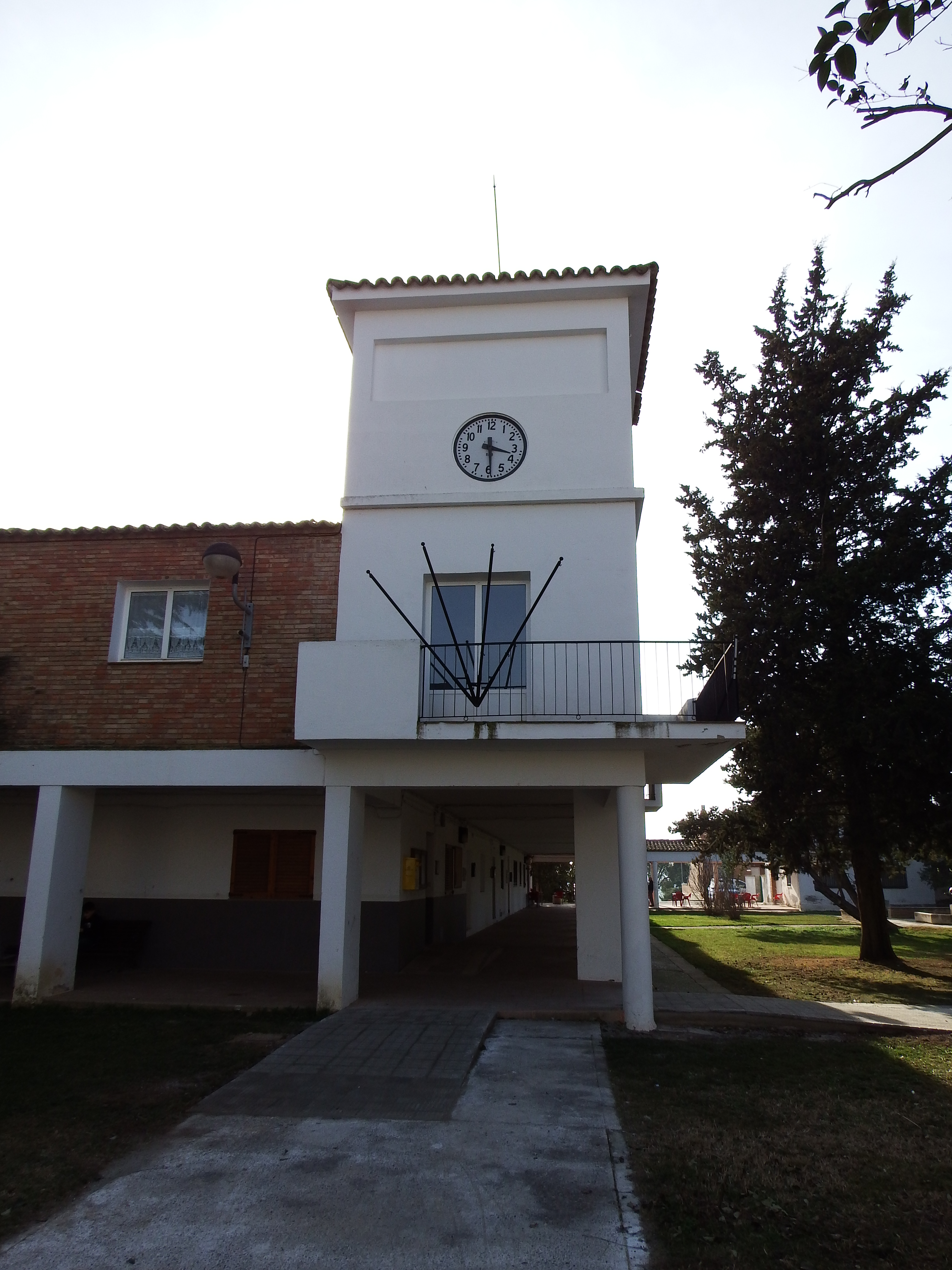
Town Hall of Vencillón

== See also ==
- List of municipalities in Huesca
