= Laspaúles =

Coordinates: 42°28′N 0°36′E

Laspaúles (Spanish) Laspaúls (Ribagorçan) Las Pauls (Aragonese)
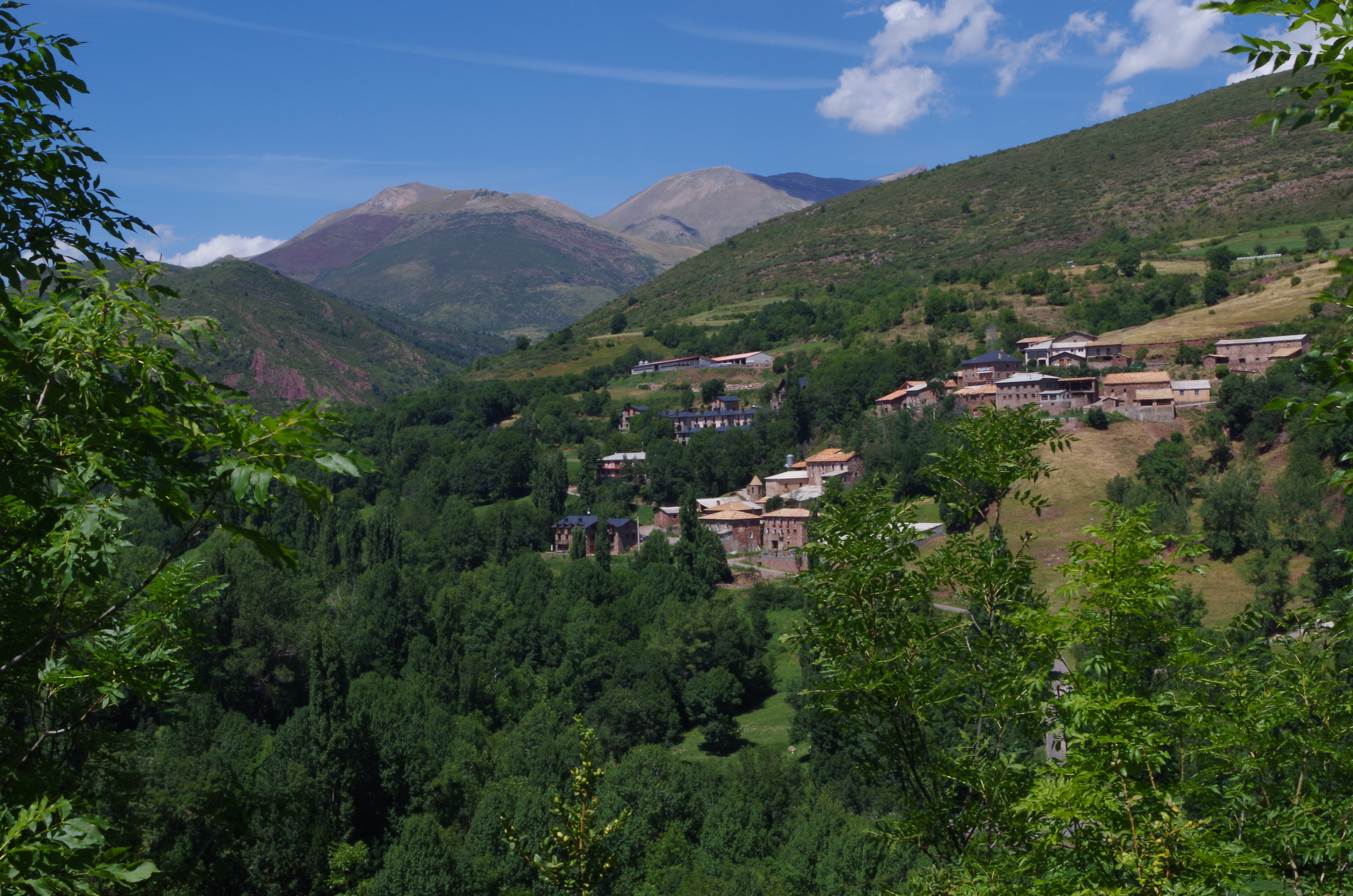
- Interactive map of Laspaúles (Spanish)
- Country: Spain
- Autonomous community: Aragon
- Province: Huesca
- Municipality: Laspaúles/Les Paüls

Area
  - Total: 81 km^{2} (31 sq mi)

Population (2025-01-01)
  - Total: 255
  - Density: 3.1/km^{2} (8.2/sq mi)
- Time zone: UTC+1 (CET)
  - Summer (DST): UTC+2 (CEST)

Laspaúles (Spanish: [laspaˈules]), in Ribagorçan: Laspaúls (locally [laspaˈuls]), or in Aragonese: Las Pauls, is a municipality located in the province of Huesca, Aragon, Spain. According to the 2004 census (INE), the municipality has a population of 277 inhabitants.

== See also ==
- List of municipalities in Huesca
