= Castejón de Sos =

Municipality in Aragon, Spain

Coordinates: 42°31′N 0°30′E

Castejón de Sos (Spanish) Castilló de Sos (Benasquese) Castilló de Sos (Aragonese)
- Interactive map of Castejón de Sos (Spanish)
- Country: Spain
- Autonomous community: Aragon
- Province: Huesca
- Municipality: Castejón de Sos/ Castilló de Sos

Area
  - Total: 31 km^{2} (12 sq mi)

Population (2025-01-01)
  - Total: 840
  - Density: 27/km^{2} (70/sq mi)
- Time zone: UTC+1 (CET)
  - Summer (DST): UTC+2 (CEST)

Castejón de Sos (Spanish: [kasteˈxon de ˈsos]), in Benasquese: Castilló de Sos, is a municipality located in the province of Huesca, Aragon, Spain. According to the 2004 census (INE), the municipality had a population of 731 inhabitants.

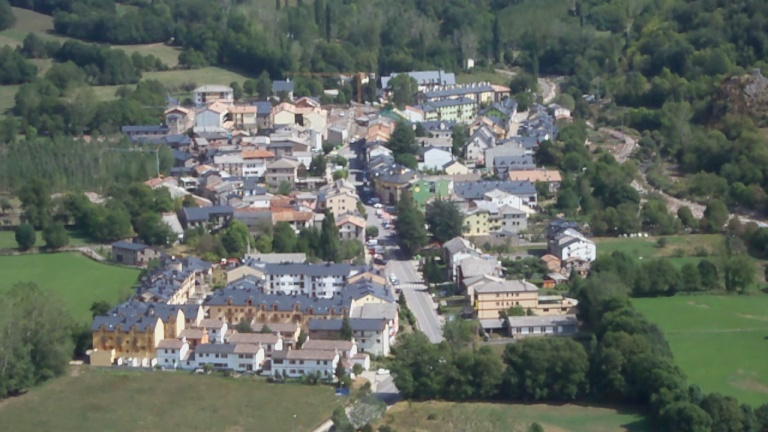
Castejon de Sos from Chia (from west)

== See also ==
- List of municipalities in Huesca
