= Monesma y Cajigar =

Coordinates: 42.260°N 0.597°E

Monesma y Cajigar (Spanish) Monesma i Caixigar (Catalan) Monesma y Caixigar (Aragonese)
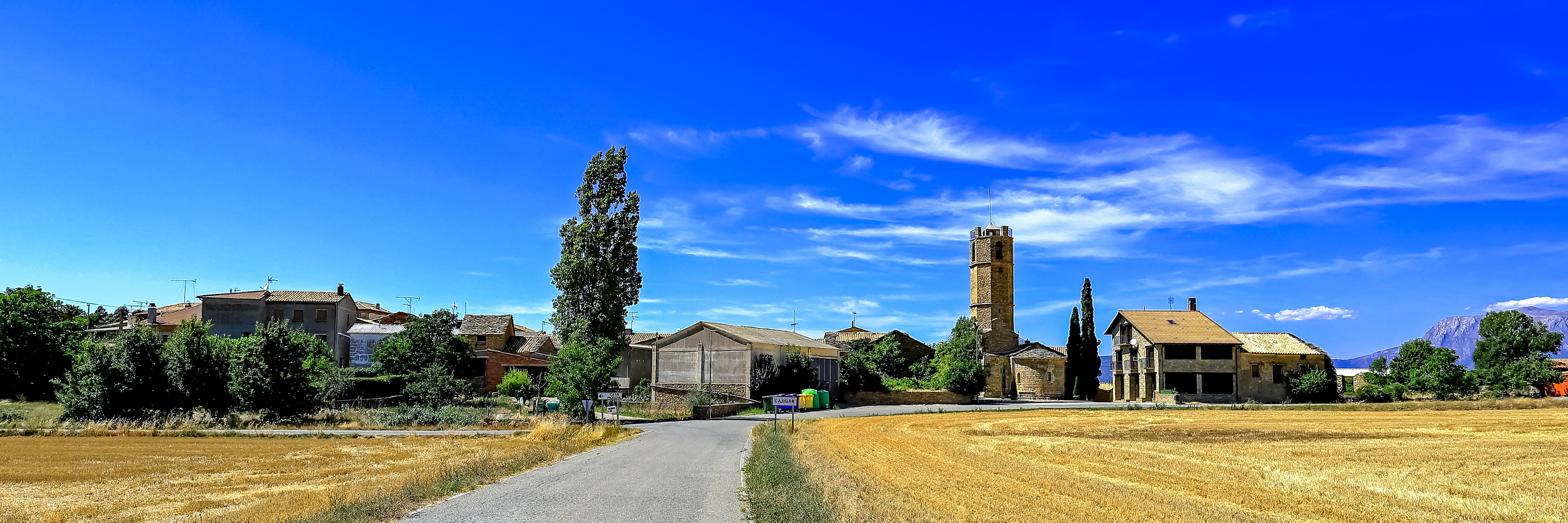

- Flag Coat of arms
- Interactive map of Monesma y Cajigar (Spanish)
- Country: Spain
- Autonomous community: Aragon
- Province: Huesca
- Municipality: Monesma y Cajigar/ Monesma i Queixigar

Area
  - Total: 62 km^{2} (24 sq mi)
- Elevation: 1,025 m (3,363 ft)

Population (2025-01-01)
  - Total: 68
  - Density: 1.1/km^{2} (2.8/sq mi)
- Time zone: UTC+1 (CET)
  - Summer (DST): UTC+2 (CEST)

Monesma y Cajigar (Spanish: [moˈnesmaj kaxiˈɣaɾ]), in Catalan: Monesma i Caixigar (locally [moˈnɛzmaj kajʃiˈɣaɾ]), or in Aragonese: Monesma y Caixigar, is a municipality located in the province of Huesca, Aragon, Spain. According to the 2004 census (INE), the municipality has a population of 104 inhabitants.

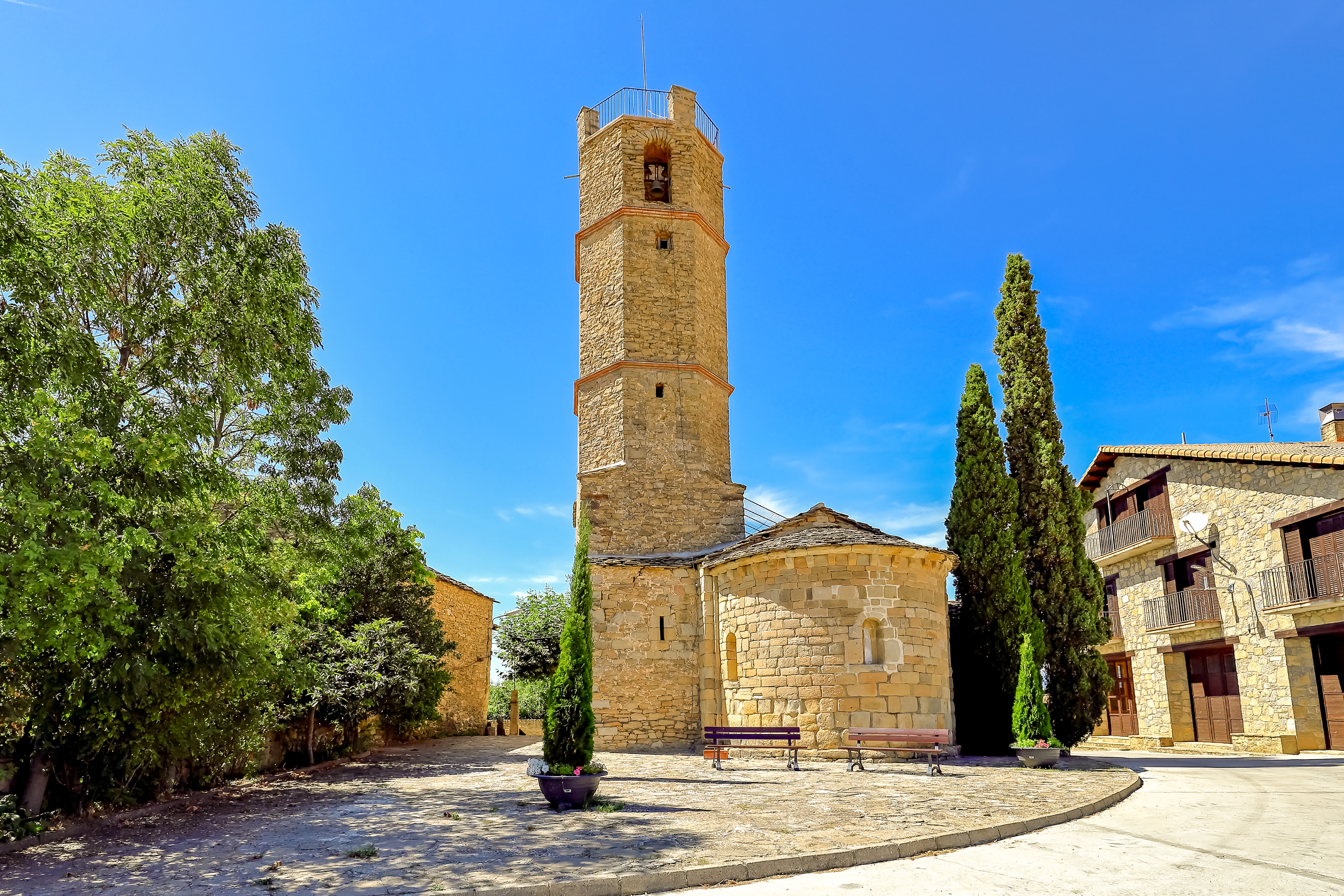
Church of Santa María in Monesma y Cajigar

== See also ==
- List of municipalities in Huesca
