= La Cerollera =

La Cerollera/La Sorollera
- municipality
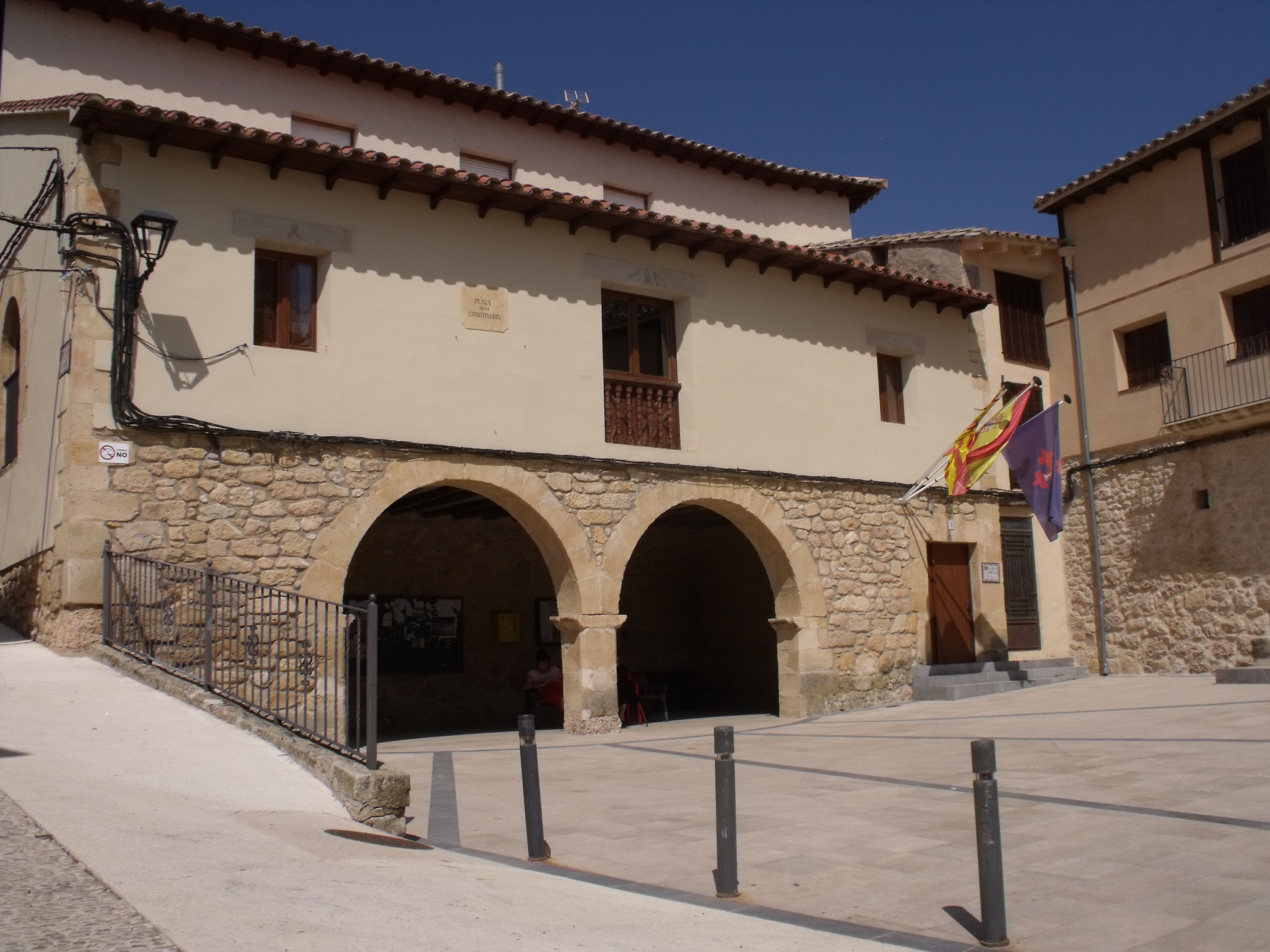
- Town hall

- Flag Coat of arms

- Location of La Cerollera/La Sorollera within Aragon Location of La Cerollera/La Sorollera within Spain
- Coordinates: 40°50′N 0°3′W
- Country: Spain
- Autonomous community: Aragon
- Province: Teruel

Area
  - Total: 33.75 km^{2} (13.03 sq mi)
- Elevation: 840 m (2,760 ft)

Population (2025-01-01)
  - Total: 77
  - Density: 2.3/km^{2} (5.9/sq mi)
- Time zone: UTC+1 (CET)
  - Summer (DST): UTC+2 (CEST)

La Cerollera (Spanish pronunciation: [la θeɾoˈʎeɾa]) or La Sorollera (Catalan pronunciation: [la soɾoˈʎeɾa]) is a municipality located in the province of Teruel, Aragon, Spain. According to the 2018 census (INE), the municipality has a population of 100 inhabitants.

== See also ==
- List of municipalities in Teruel
