= Castigaleu =

Coordinates: 42°12′N 0°35′E

- Flag Coat of arms
- Interactive map of Castigaleu
- Country: Spain
- Autonomous community: Aragon
- Province: Huesca
- Municipality: Castigaleu

Area
  - Total: 26 km^{2} (10 sq mi)

Population (2025-01-01)
  - Total: 80
  - Density: 3.1/km^{2} (8.0/sq mi)
- Time zone: UTC+1 (CET)
  - Summer (DST): UTC+2 (CEST)
- Website: Web de Castigaleu https://www.castigaleu.com

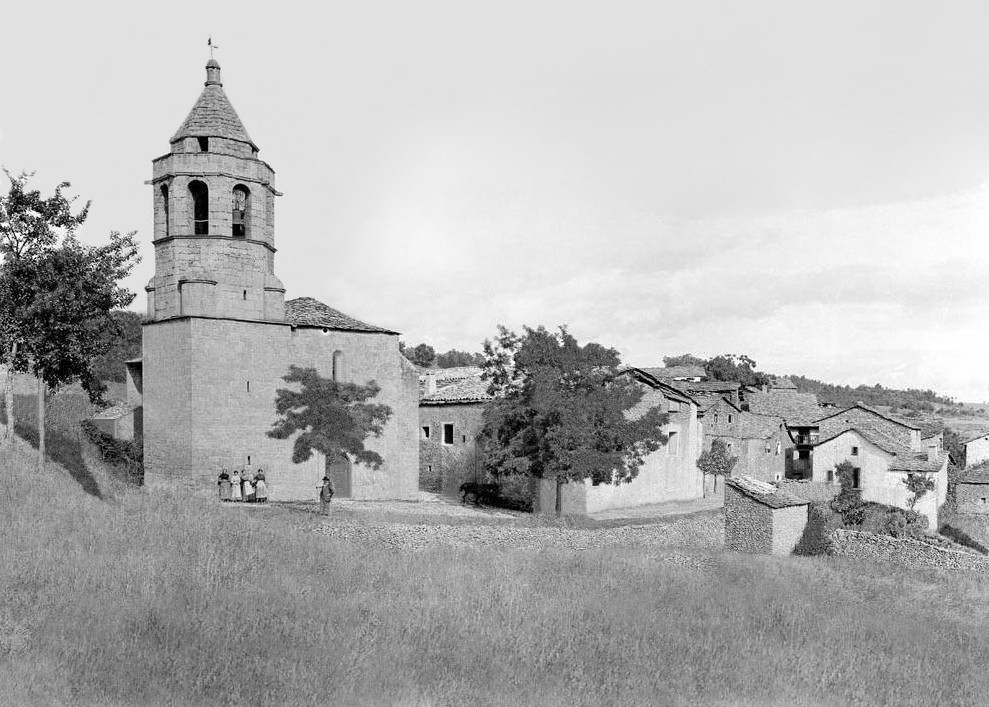
Castigaleu

Castigaleu (Spanish: [kastiɣaˈlew]; Catalan: [kəstiɣəˈlɛw]) is a municipality located in the province of Huesca, Aragon, Spain. According to the 2004 census (INE), the municipality has a population of 115 inhabitants.

== See also ==
- List of municipalities in Huesca
