= Lascuarre =

Coordinates: 42°12′N 0°31′E

Lascuarre (Spanish) Lascuarri (Catalan) Llascuarre (Aragonese)
- municipality
- Flag Coat of arms
- Interactive map of Lascuarre (Spanish)
- Country: Spain
- Autonomous community: Aragon
- Province: Huesca

Area
  - Total: 31 km^{2} (12 sq mi)

Population (2025-01-01)
  - Total: 139
  - Density: 4.5/km^{2} (12/sq mi)
- Time zone: UTC+1 (CET)
  - Summer (DST): UTC+2 (CEST)

Lascuarre (in Spanish, [lasˈkwa.re]), Llascuarre (in Aragonese, [ʎasˈkwa.re]), or Lasquarri (in Catalan, [lasˈkwa.ri]), is a municipality located in the province of Huesca, Aragon, Spain. According to the 2004 census (INE), the municipality has a population of 146 inhabitants.

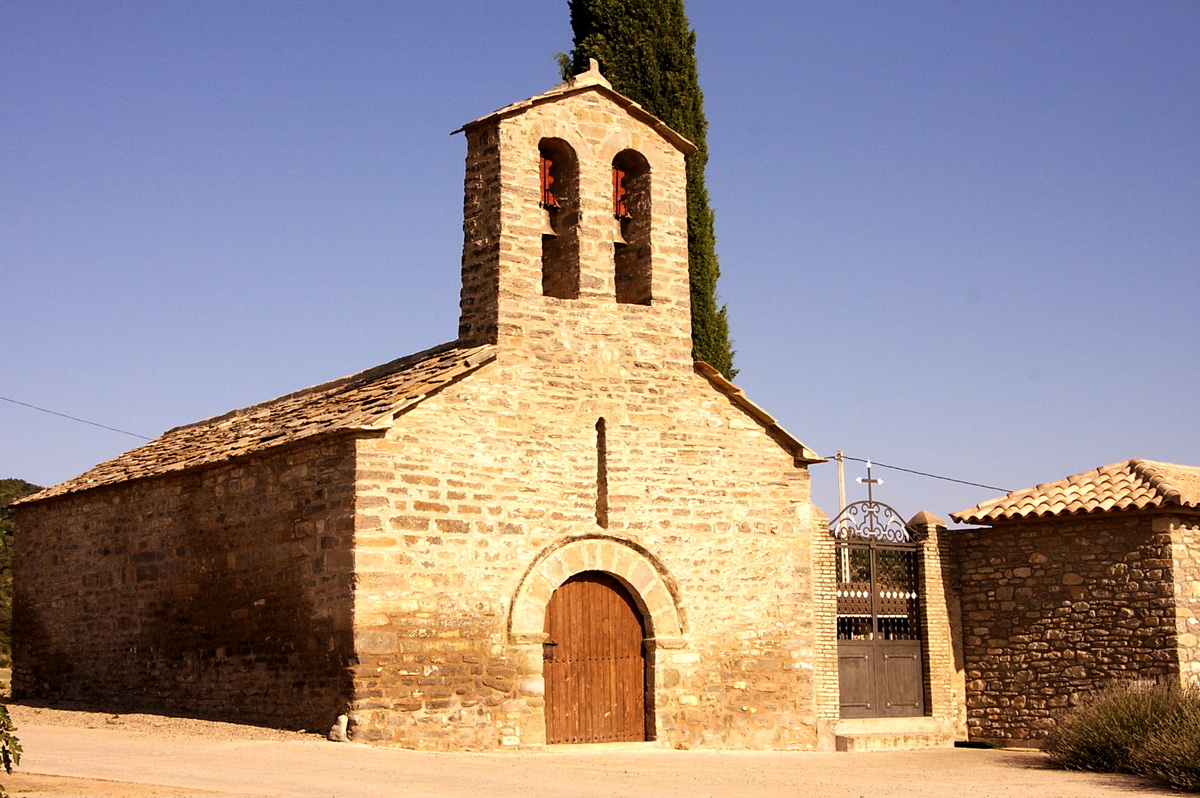
Hermitage of Sant Martí in Lascuarre

== See also ==
- List of municipalities in Huesca
