= La Cañada de Verich =

La Cañada de Verich/ La Canyada de Veric
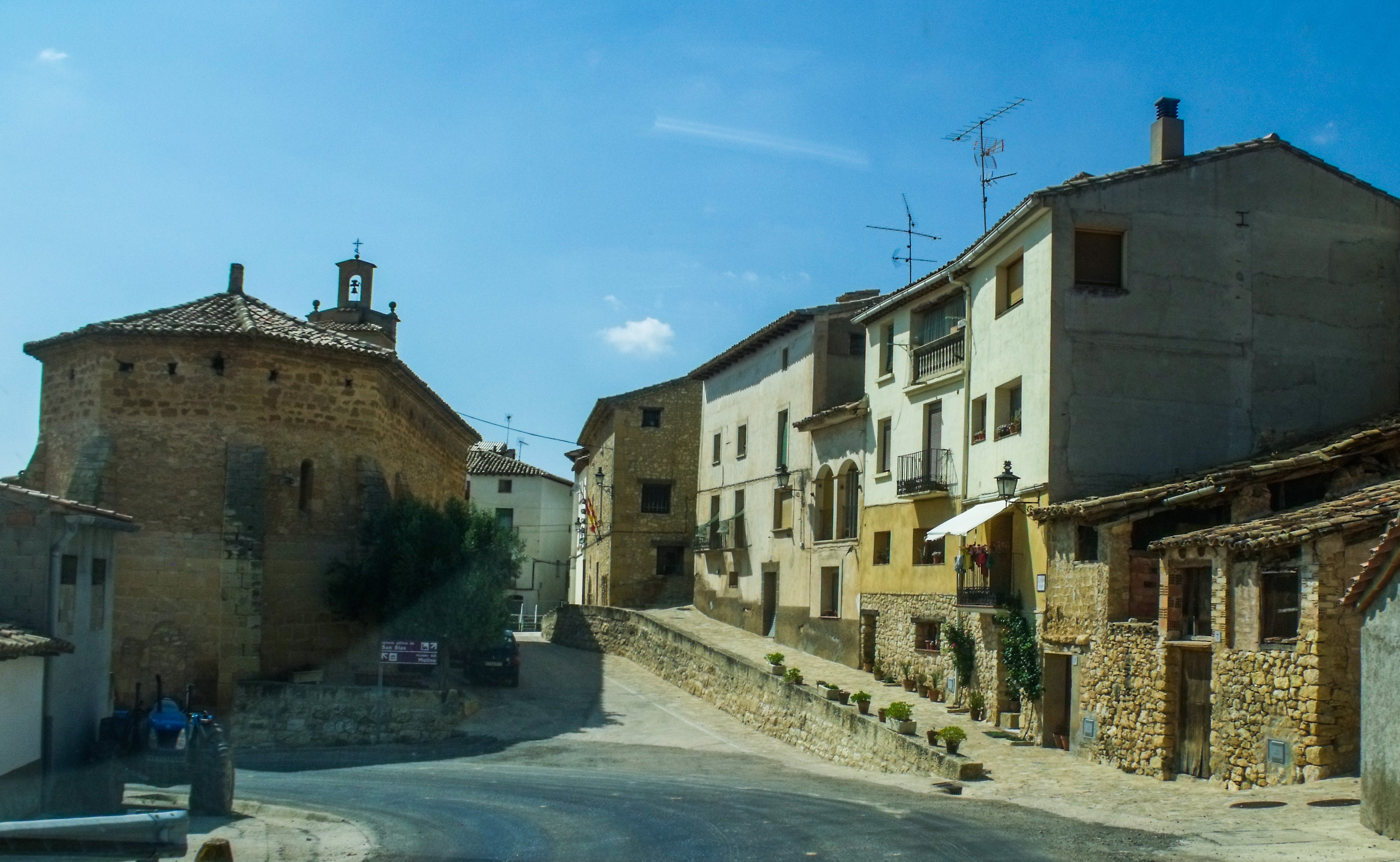

- Location of La Cañada de Verich/La Canyada de Veric within Aragon Location of La Cañada de Verich/La Canyada de Veric within Spain
- Coordinates: 40°52′N 0°6′W
- Country: Spain
- Autonomous community: Aragon
- Province: Teruel
- Municipality: La Cañada de Verich/ La Canyada de Veric

Area
  - Total: 10.86 km^{2} (4.19 sq mi)
- Elevation: 738 m (2,421 ft)

Population (2025-01-01)
  - Total: 72
  - Density: 6.6/km^{2} (17/sq mi)
- Time zone: UTC+1 (CET)
  - Summer (DST): UTC+2 (CEST)

La Cañada de Verich (Spanish: [la kaˈɲaða ðe βeˈɾik]) or La Canyada de Veric (Catalan: [la kaˈɲaða ðe βeˈɾik]) is a municipality located in the province of Teruel, Aragon, Spain. According to the 2004 census (INE), the municipality had a population of 103 inhabitants.

La Canyada de Verich has traditionally lived from livestock farming and agriculture. The usual crops in the area are olives and cereals. As a result of the great frost that took place in 1956, which destroyed most of the olive trees, almond tree cultivation spread throughout the area. The mining activity in this town is also noteworthy.

Its main monument is the parish church of San Blas, which is reported as early as 1324. It is a construction in the usual Gothic style in the area, much modified at the end of the 16th century.

== See also ==
- List of municipalities in Teruel
