= Castillonroy =

Coordinates: 41°53′N 0°31′E

Castillonroy/Castellonroi
- municipality
- Coat of arms
- Interactive map of Castillonroy/Castellonroi
- Country: Spain
- Autonomous community: Aragon
- Province: Huesca

Area
  - Total: 37 km^{2} (14 sq mi)

Population (2025-01-01)
  - Total: 334
- Time zone: UTC+1 (CET)
  - Summer (DST): UTC+2 (CEST)

Castillonroy (Spanish: [kastiʎonˈroj]) or Castellonroi (Catalan: [kasteˌʎonˈrɔj]) is a municipality located in the province of Huesca, Aragon, Spain. According to the 2007 census (INE), the municipality has a population of 382 inhabitants.

It has two official names: Castillonroy and Castellonroi.

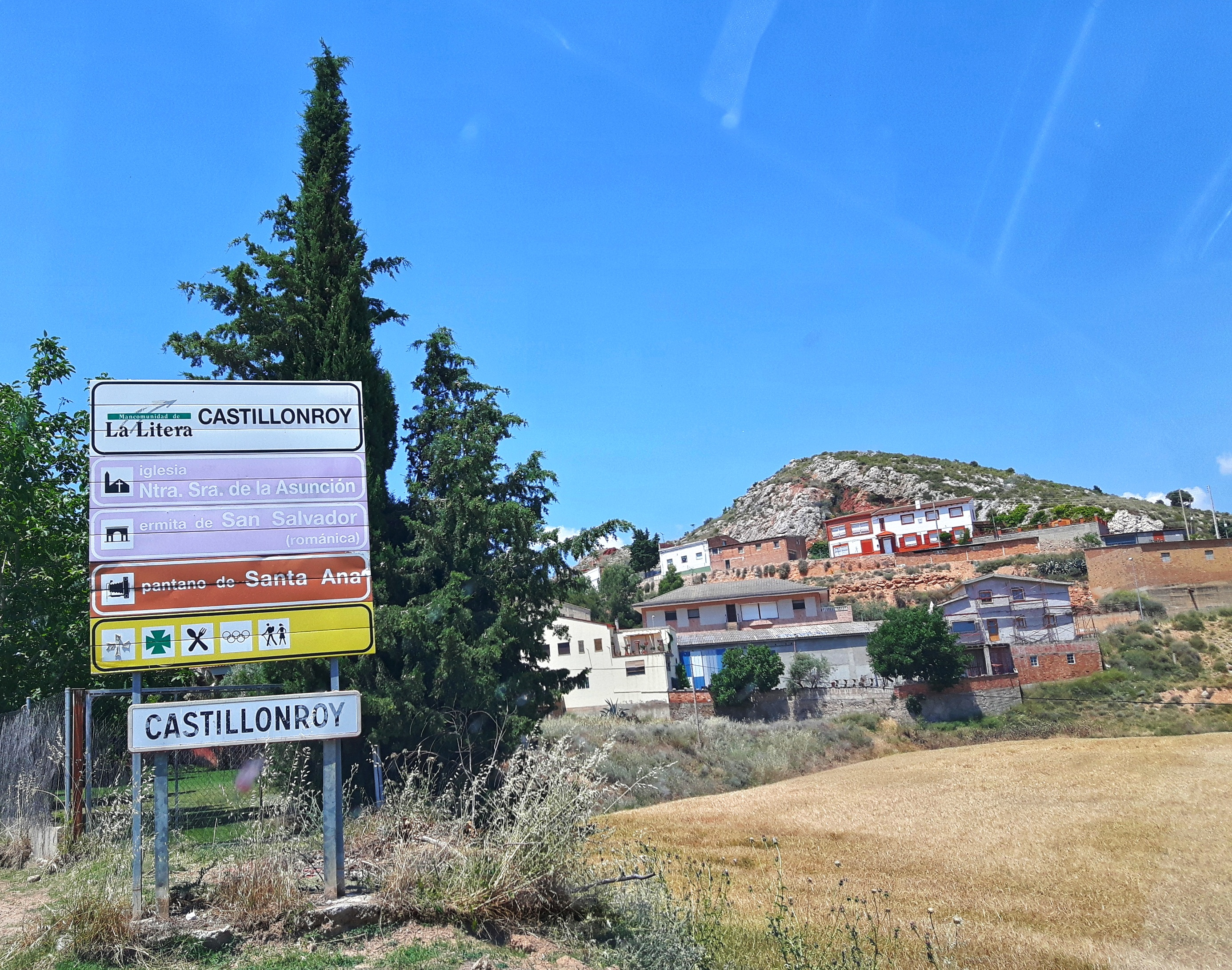
Castillonroy, Huesca

== See also ==
- List of municipalities in Huesca
