= Valdeltormo =

Valdeltormo/La Vall de Tormo
- municipality
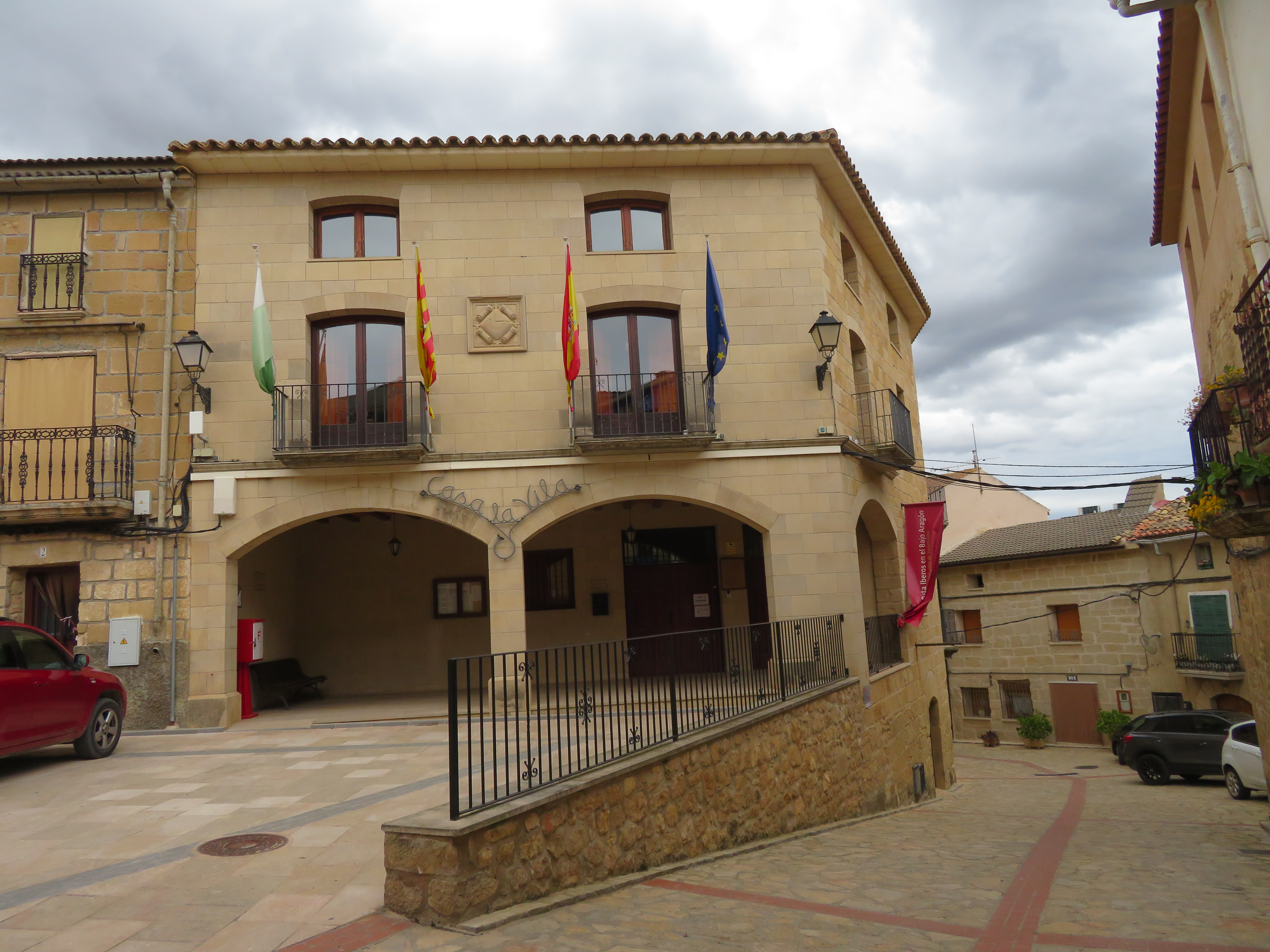
- Town hall

- Location of Valdeltormo/La Vall de Tormo within Aragon Location of Valdeltormo/La Vall de Tormo within Spain
- Coordinates: 40°59′N 0°5′E
- Country: Spain
- Autonomous community: Aragon
- Province: Teruel
- Municipality: Valdeltormo/La Vall de Tormo

Area
  - Total: 16 km^{2} (6.2 sq mi)
- Elevation: 436 m (1,430 ft)

Population (2025-01-01)
  - Total: 304
  - Density: 19/km^{2} (49/sq mi)
- Time zone: UTC+1 (CET)
  - Summer (DST): UTC+2 (CEST)

Valdeltormo (Spanish: [ˌbaldelˈtoɾmo]) or La Vall de Tormo (Catalan: [la ˈβaʎ de ˈtoɾmo]) is a municipality located in the Matarraña/Matarranya comarca, province of Teruel, Aragon, Spain. According to the 2004 census (INE), the municipality has a population of 354 inhabitants.

== See also ==
- List of municipalities in Teruel
