= Mazaleón =

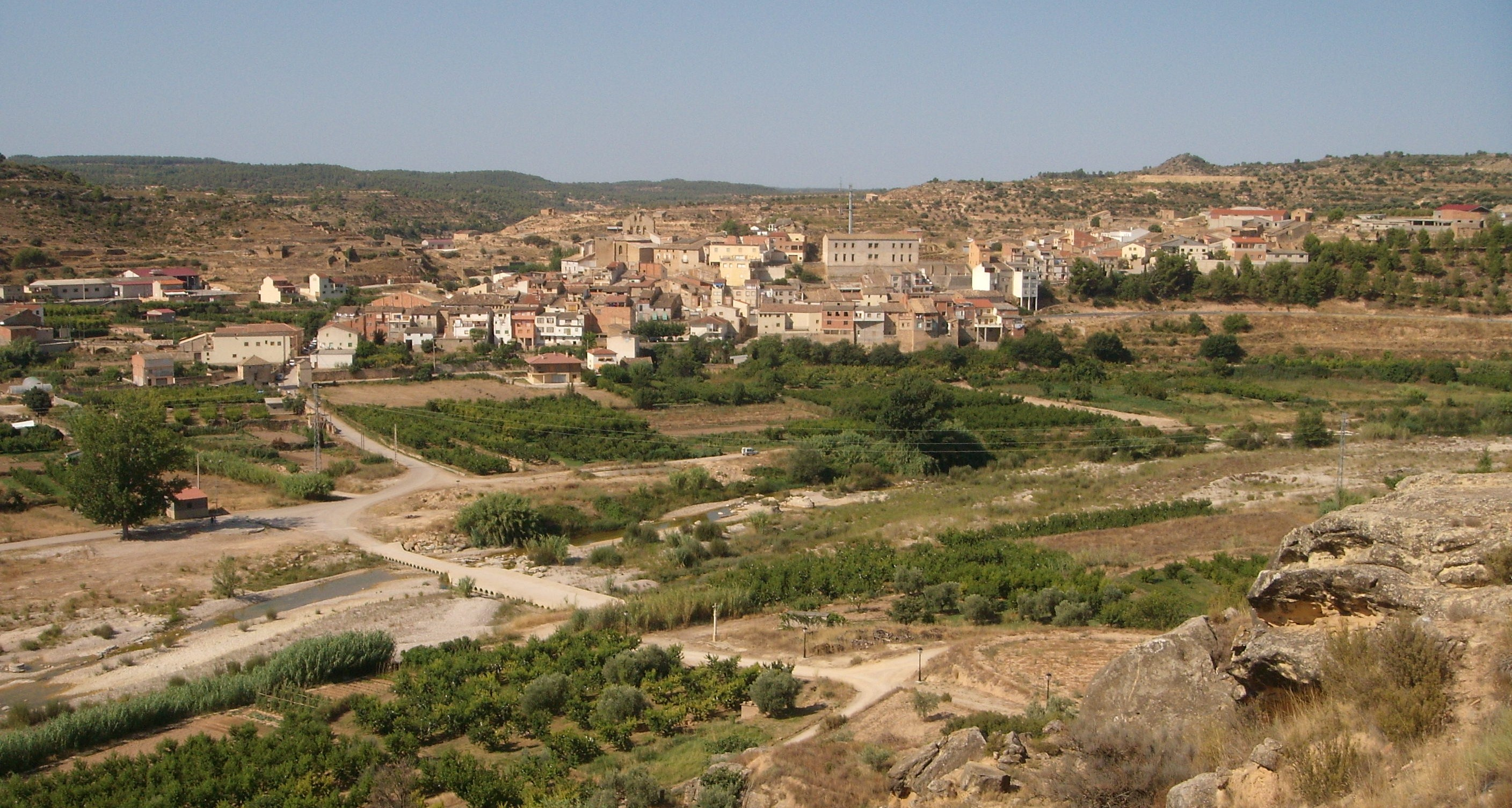

- Coat of arms

- Location of Mazaleón/Massalió within Aragon Location of Mazaleón/Massalió within Spain
- Coordinates: 41°3′N 0°7′E
- Country: Spain
- Autonomous community: Aragon
- Province: Teruel
- Municipality: Mazaleón/Massalió

Area
  - Total: 85 km^{2} (33 sq mi)
- Elevation: 359 m (1,178 ft)

Population (2025-01-01)
  - Total: 474
  - Density: 5.6/km^{2} (14/sq mi)
- Time zone: UTC+1 (CET)
  - Summer (DST): UTC+2 (CEST)

Mazaleón (Spanish: [maθaleˈon]) or Massalió (Catalan: [masaliˈo]) is a municipality located in the Matarraña/Matarranya comarca, province of Teruel, Aragon, Spain. According to the 2004 census (INE), the municipality has a population of 587 inhabitants.

== See also ==
- List of municipalities in Teruel
