= Sesué =

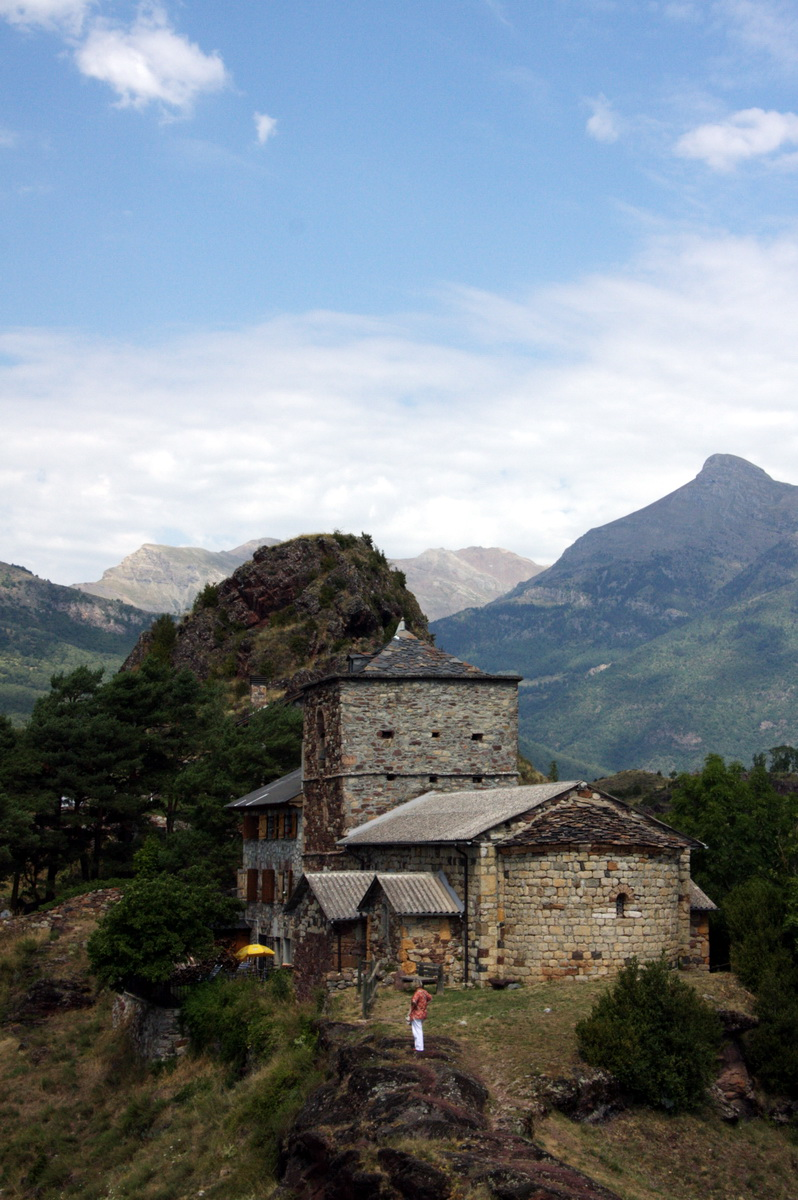
- Church of Saint Andrew

- Flag Coat of arms

- Location in Spain Sesué (Aragon)
- Coordinates: 42°33′N 0°28′E
- Country: Spain
- Autonomous community: Aragon
- Province: Huesca
- Municipality: Sesué/Sessué

Area
  - Total: 5.20 km^{2} (2.01 sq mi)

Population (2025-01-01)
  - Total: 120
  - Density: 23/km^{2} (60/sq mi)
- Time zone: UTC+1 (CET)
  - Summer (DST): UTC+2 (CEST)

Sesué (Spanish: [seˈswe]) (locally [sesuˈe]) is a municipality located in the province of Huesca, Aragon, Spain. According to the 2004 census (INE), the municipality has a population of 130 inhabitants.

== See also ==
- List of municipalities in Huesca
