= Valjunquera =

Valjunquera/Valljunquera
- municipality
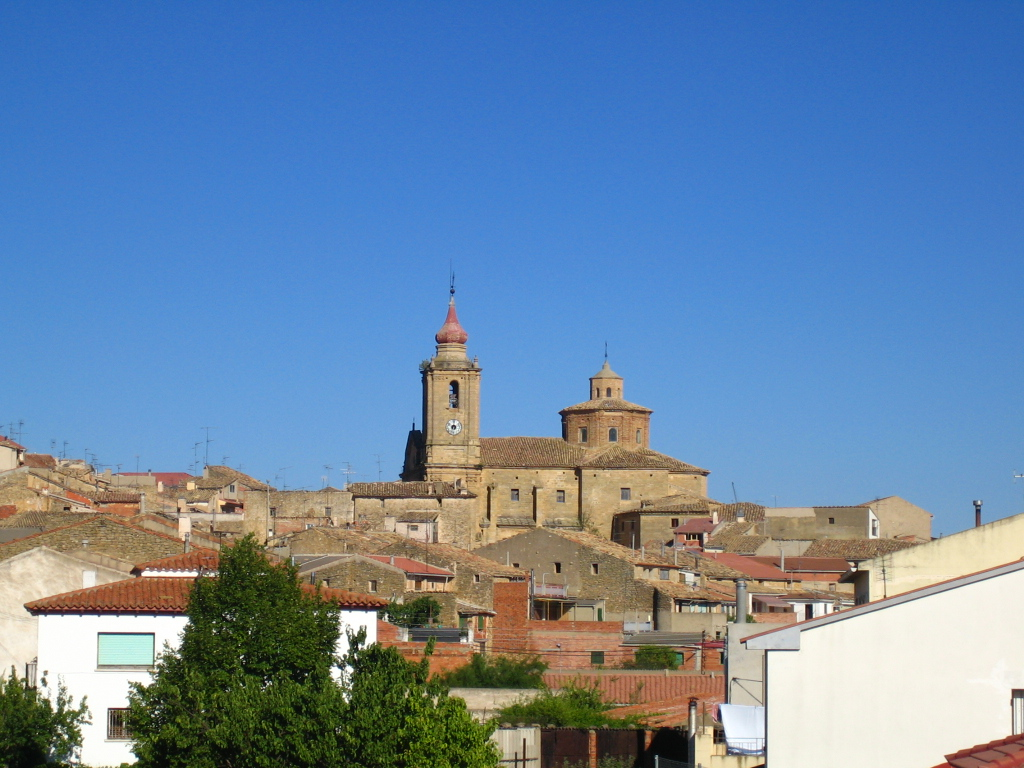

- Location of Valjunquera/Valljunquera within Aragon Location of Valjunquera/Valljunquera within Spain
- Coordinates: 40°57′N 0°2′E
- Country: Spain
- Autonomous community: Aragon
- Province: Teruel

Area
  - Total: 42 km^{2} (16 sq mi)
- Elevation: 552 m (1,811 ft)

Population (2025-01-01)
  - Total: 336
  - Density: 8.0/km^{2} (21/sq mi)
- Time zone: UTC+1 (CET)
  - Summer (DST): UTC+2 (CEST)

Valjunquera (Spanish: [balxuŋˈkeɾa]) or Valljunquera (Catalan: [ˌbaʎʒuŋˈkeɾa]) is a municipality located in the Matarraña/Matarranya comarca, province of Teruel, Aragon, Spain. According to the 2004 census (INE), the municipality has a population of 420 inhabitants.

== See also ==
- List of municipalities in Teruel
