= Viacamp y Litera =

Coordinates: 42.127°N 0.615°E

Viacamp y Litera (Spanish) Viacamp i Lliterà (Catalan)
- municipality
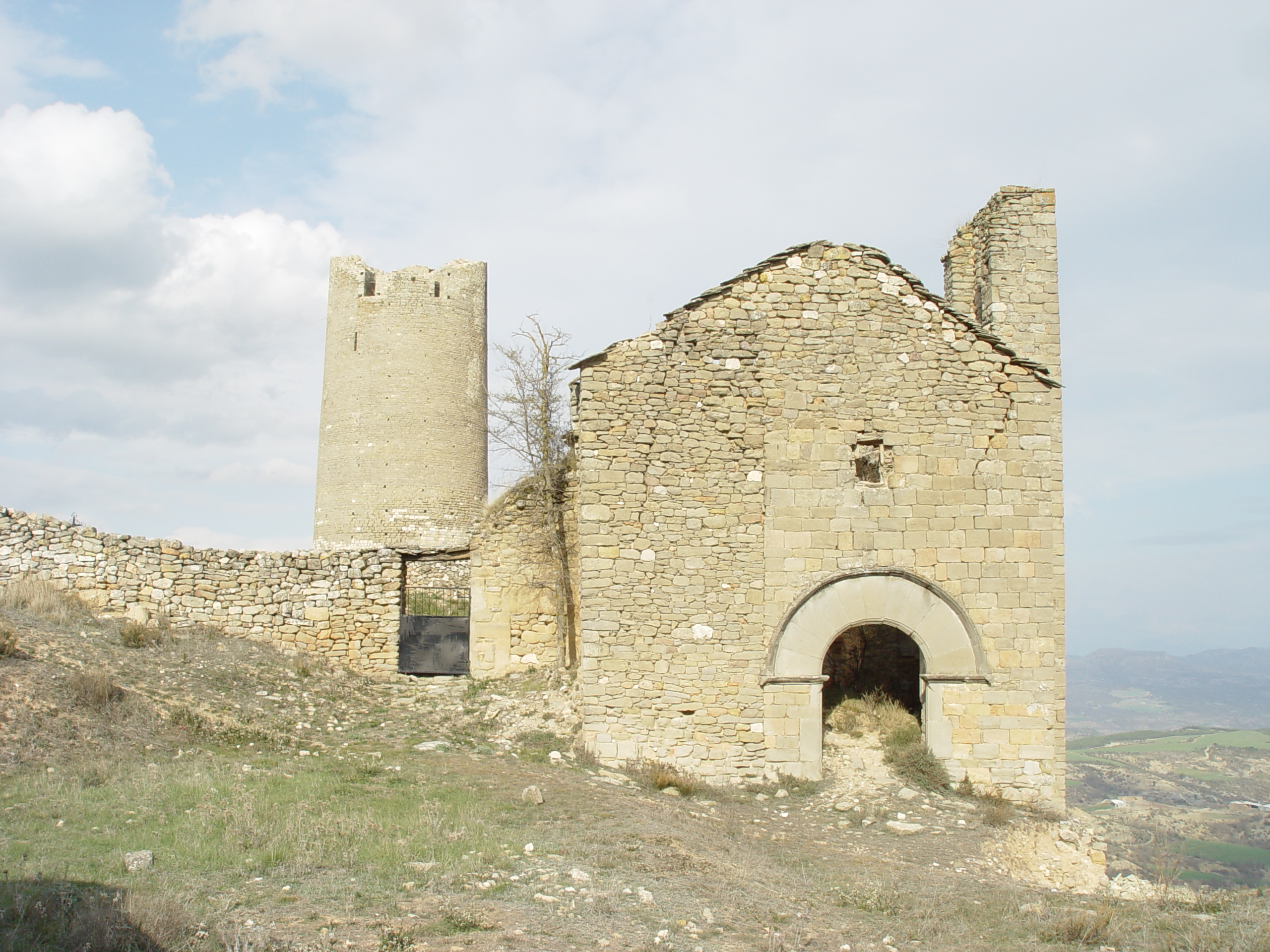
- Church of Sant Esteve de Viacamp

- Flag Coat of arms
- Interactive map of Viacamp y Litera (Spanish)
- Country: Spain
- Autonomous community: Aragon
- Province: Huesca

Area
  - Total: 108 km^{2} (42 sq mi)

Population (2025-01-01)
  - Total: 40
  - Density: 0.37/km^{2} (0.96/sq mi)
- Time zone: UTC+1 (CET)
  - Summer (DST): UTC+2 (CEST)

Viacamp y Litera (Spanish: [bjaˈkamp i liteˈɾa]), in Catalan: Viacamp i Lliterà (locally [biaˈkam i ʎiteˈɾa]) is a municipality located in the province of Huesca, Aragon, Spain. According to the 2004 census (INE), the municipality has a population of 26 inhabitants.

== See also ==
- List of municipalities in Huesca
