= San Esteban de Litera =

Coordinates: 41°54′N 0°20′E

San Esteban de Litera/Sant Esteve de Llitera
- municipality
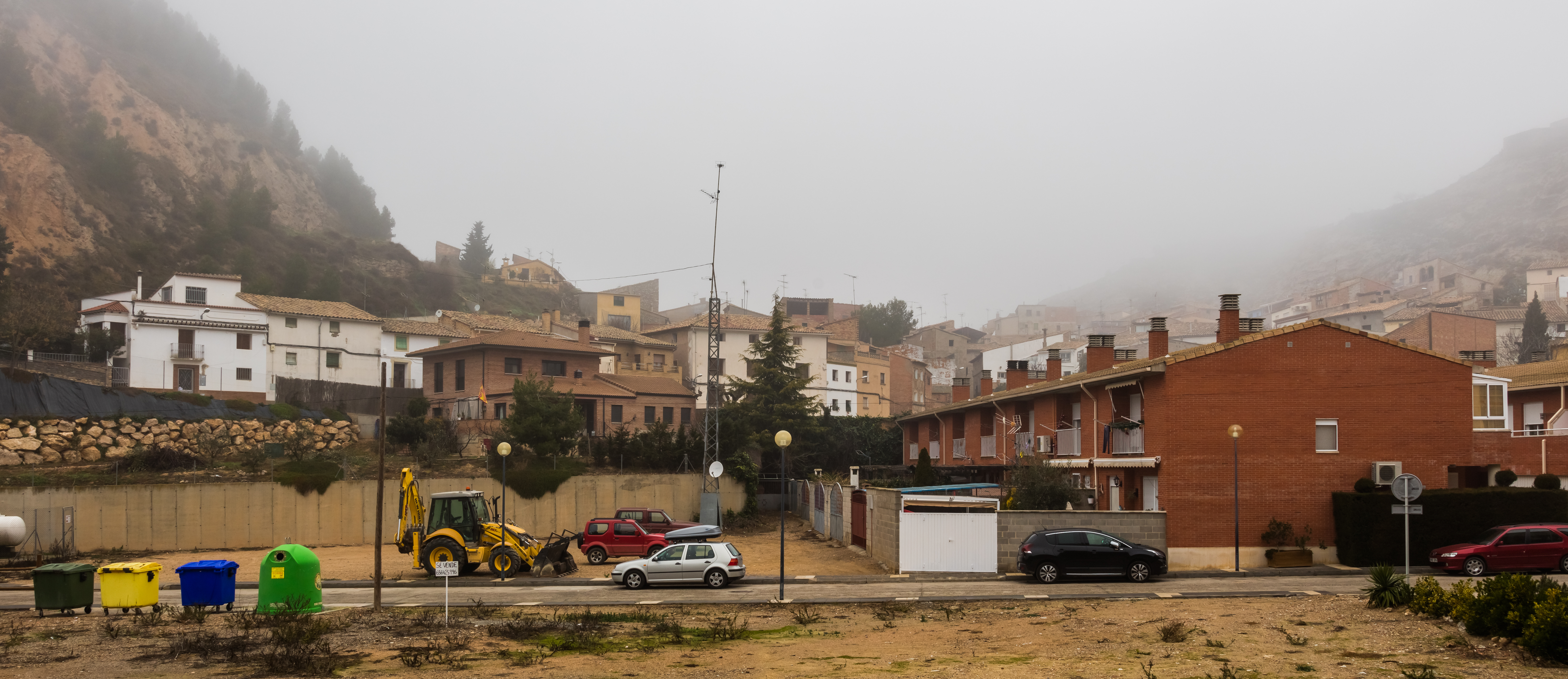

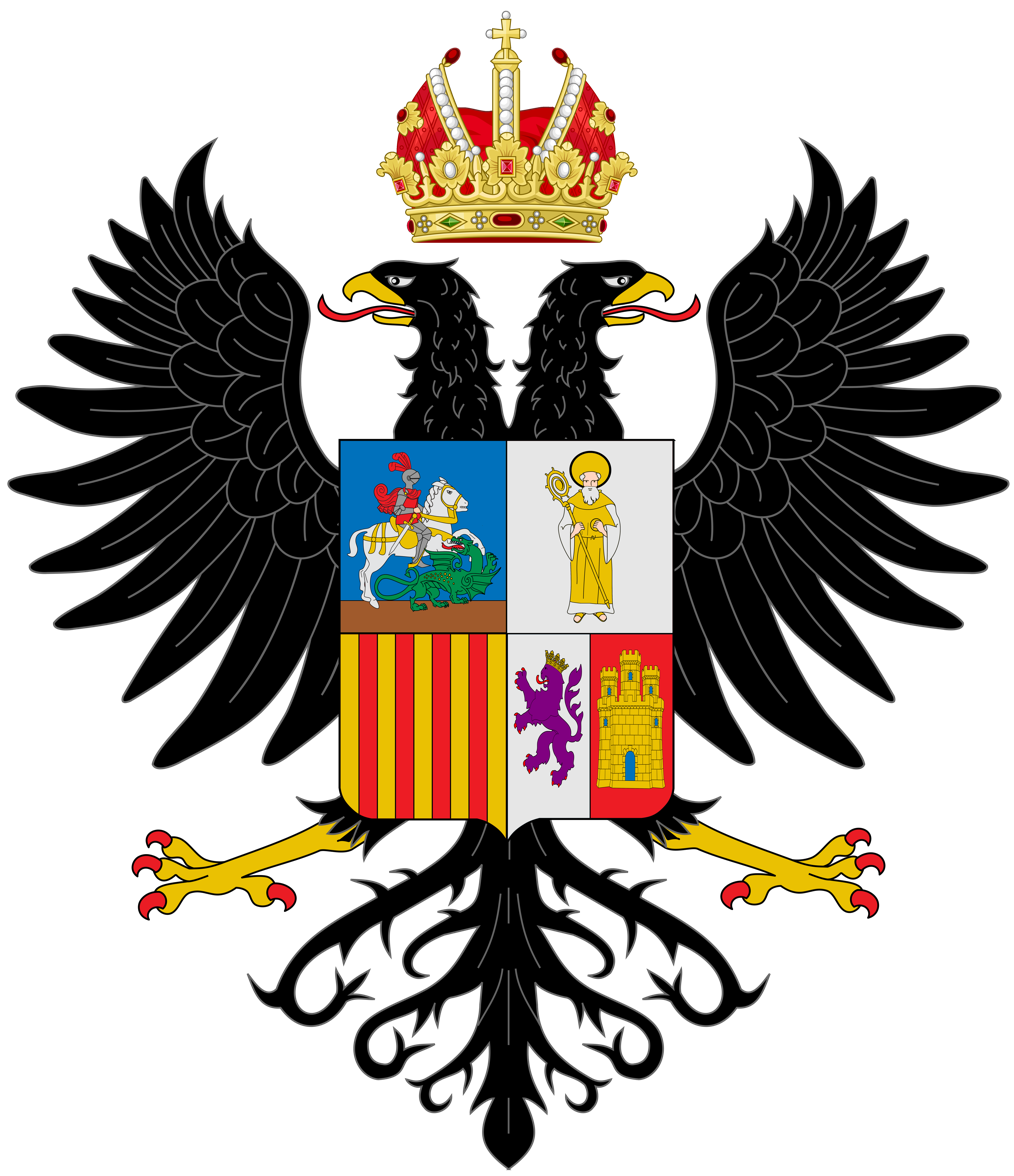
- Coat of arms
- Interactive map of San Esteban de Litera/Sant Esteve de Llitera
- Country: Spain
- Autonomous community: Aragon
- Province: Huesca
- Municipality: San Esteban de Litera

Area
  - Total: 72 km^{2} (28 sq mi)
- Elevation: 420 m (1,380 ft)

Population (2025-01-01)
  - Total: 672
  - Density: 9.3/km^{2} (24/sq mi)
- Time zone: UTC+1 (CET)
  - Summer (DST): UTC+2 (CEST)

San Esteban de Litera (Spanish: [ˈsan esˈteβan de liˈteɾa]) or Sant Esteve de Llitera (Catalan: [ˈsant esˈteβe ðe ʎiˈteɾa]) is a municipality located in the province of Huesca, Aragon, Spain. According to the 2004 census (INE), the municipality has a population of 562 inhabitants.

During the War of the Spanish Succession on 15 January 1706, it was the site of a minor but bloody battle between a French force of 4,500 and a combined English-Dutch detachment of 1,500, which ended with the French withdrawing.

== See also ==
- List of municipalities in Huesca

== Sources ==
- Dalton, Charles (1904). English army lists and commission registers, 1661-1714, Volume V. Eyre & Spottiswoode.
