= Baldellou =

Coordinates: 41°55′N 0°33′E

Baldellou/Valldellou
- municipality
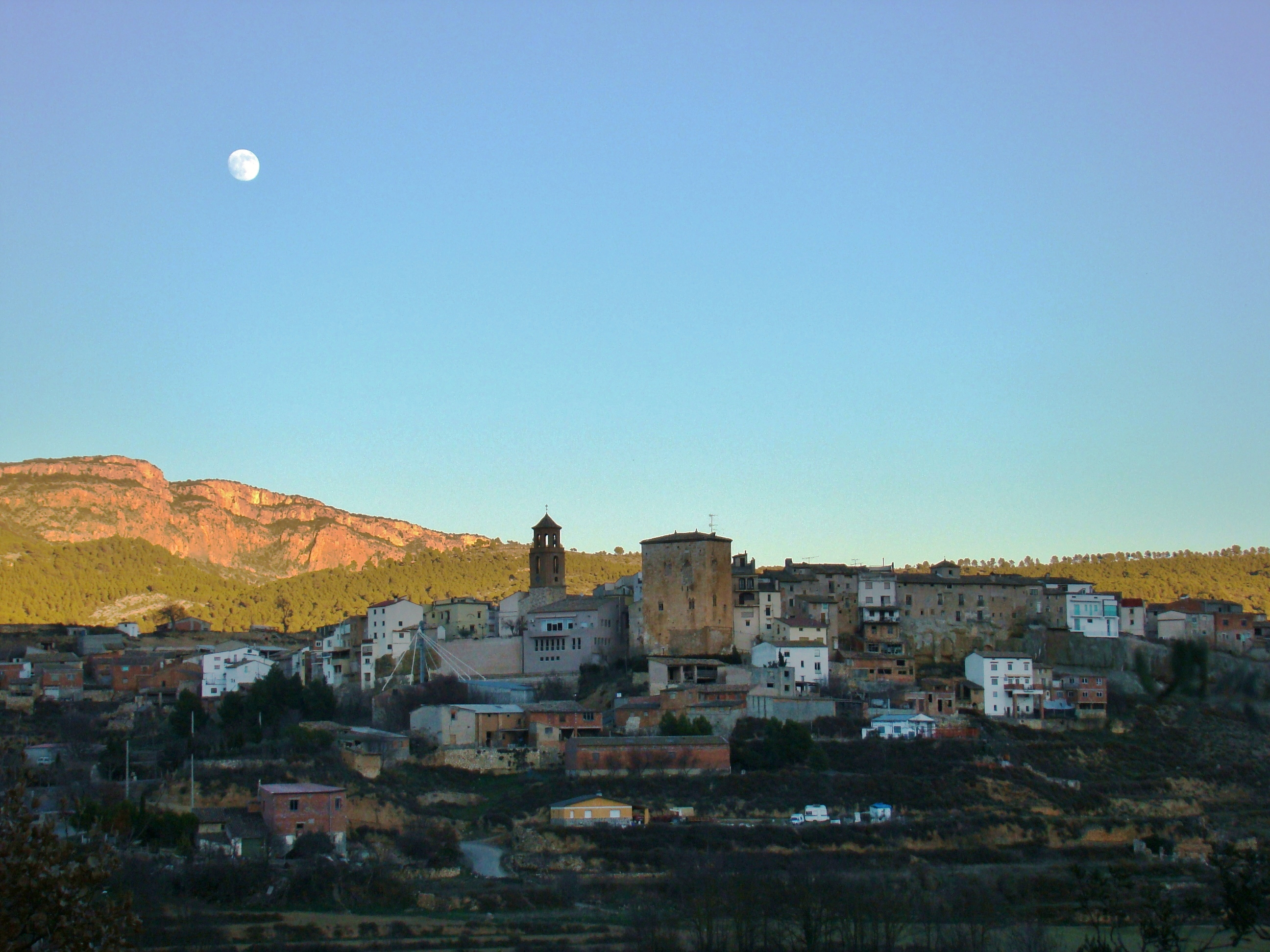
- View of Baldellou
- Interactive map of Baldellou/Valldellou
- Country: Spain
- Autonomous community: Aragon
- Province: Huesca
- Municipality: Baldellou/Valldellou

Area
  - Total: 30 km^{2} (12 sq mi)

Population (2025-01-01)
  - Total: 81
  - Density: 2.7/km^{2} (7.0/sq mi)
- Time zone: UTC+1 (CET)
  - Summer (DST): UTC+2 (CEST)

Baldellou (Spanish: [baldeˈʎow]) or Valldellou (Catalan: [ˌbaʎdeˈʎɔw]) is a municipality located in the province of Huesca, Aragon, Spain. According to the 2004 census (INE), the municipality has a population of 129 inhabitants.

It has two official names: Baldellou and Valldellou.

== See also ==
- List of municipalities in Huesca
