= Azanuy-Alins =

Municipality in Aragon, Spain

Coordinates: 41°58′N 0°18′E

Azanuy-Alins Zanui-Alins
- municipality
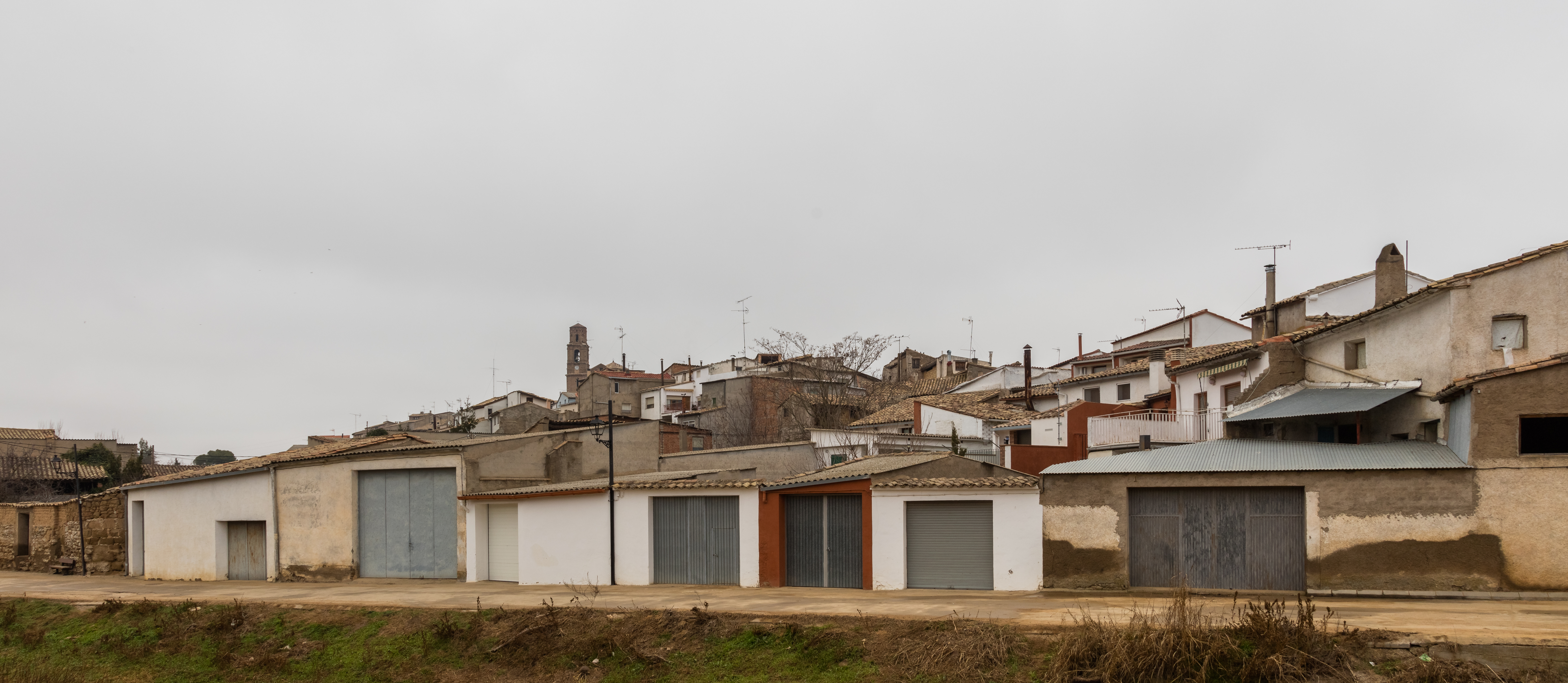

- Flag Coat of arms
- Interactive map of Azanuy-Alins
- Country: Spain
- Autonomous community: Aragon
- Province: Huesca
- Municipality: Azanuy-Alins/Sanui i Alins

Area
  - Total: 51 km^{2} (20 sq mi)

Population (2025-01-01)
  - Total: 184
  - Density: 3.6/km^{2} (9.3/sq mi)
- Time zone: UTC+1 (CET)
  - Summer (DST): UTC+2 (CEST)

Azanuy-Alins (Spanish: [aθaˈnuj aˈlins]) or Sanui i Alins (Catalan: [saˈnuj j aˈlins]) (Aragonese Zanui-Alins) is a municipality located in the province of Huesca, Aragon, Spain. According to the 2004 census (INE), the municipality has a population of 179 inhabitants.

== See also ==
- List of municipalities in Huesca
