= Torrevelilla =

Torrevelilla/La Torre de Vilella
- municipality
- Flag Coat of arms

- Location of Torrevelilla/La Torre de Vilella within Aragon Location of Torrevelilla/La Torre de Vilella within Spain
- Coordinates: 40°54′N 0°6′W
- Country: Spain
- Autonomous community: Aragon
- Province: Teruel
- Municipality: Torrevelilla/ La Torre de Vilella

Area
  - Total: 33 km^{2} (13 sq mi)

Population (2025-01-01)
  - Total: 161
  - Density: 4.9/km^{2} (13/sq mi)
- Time zone: UTC+1 (CET)
  - Summer (DST): UTC+2 (CEST)

Torrevelilla (Spanish: [ˈtoreβeˈliʎa]) or La Torre de Vilella (Catalan: [la ˈtore ðe βiˈleʎa]) is a municipality located in the province of Teruel, Aragon, Spain. According to the 2004 census (INE), the municipality has a population of 199 inhabitants.

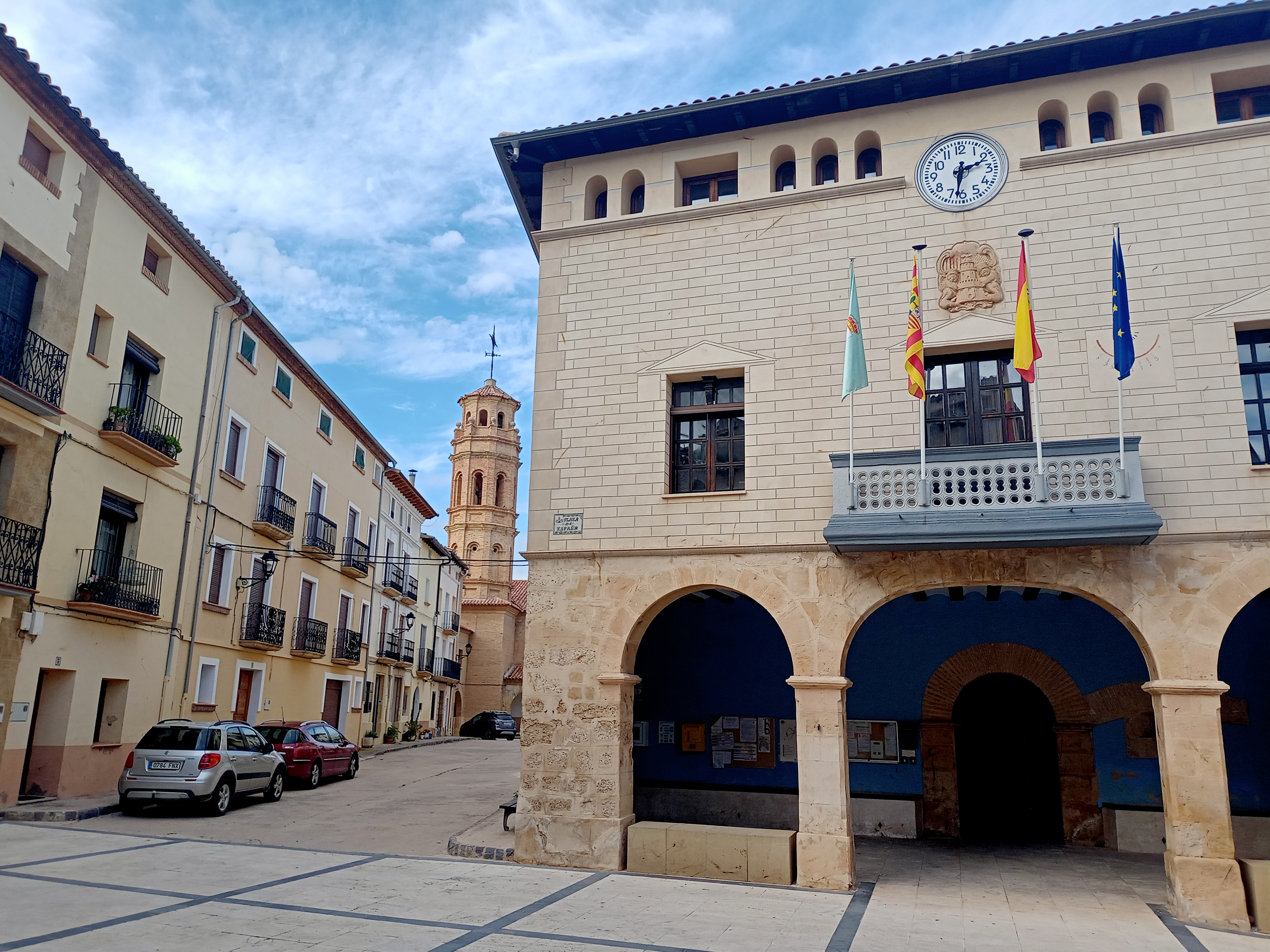
Torrevelilla

== See also ==
- List of municipalities in Teruel
