= Valle de Lierp =

Coordinates: 42.380°N 0.489°E

Valle de Lierp (Spanish) Val de Lierp (Ribagorçan) Val de Lierp (Aragonese)
- municipality
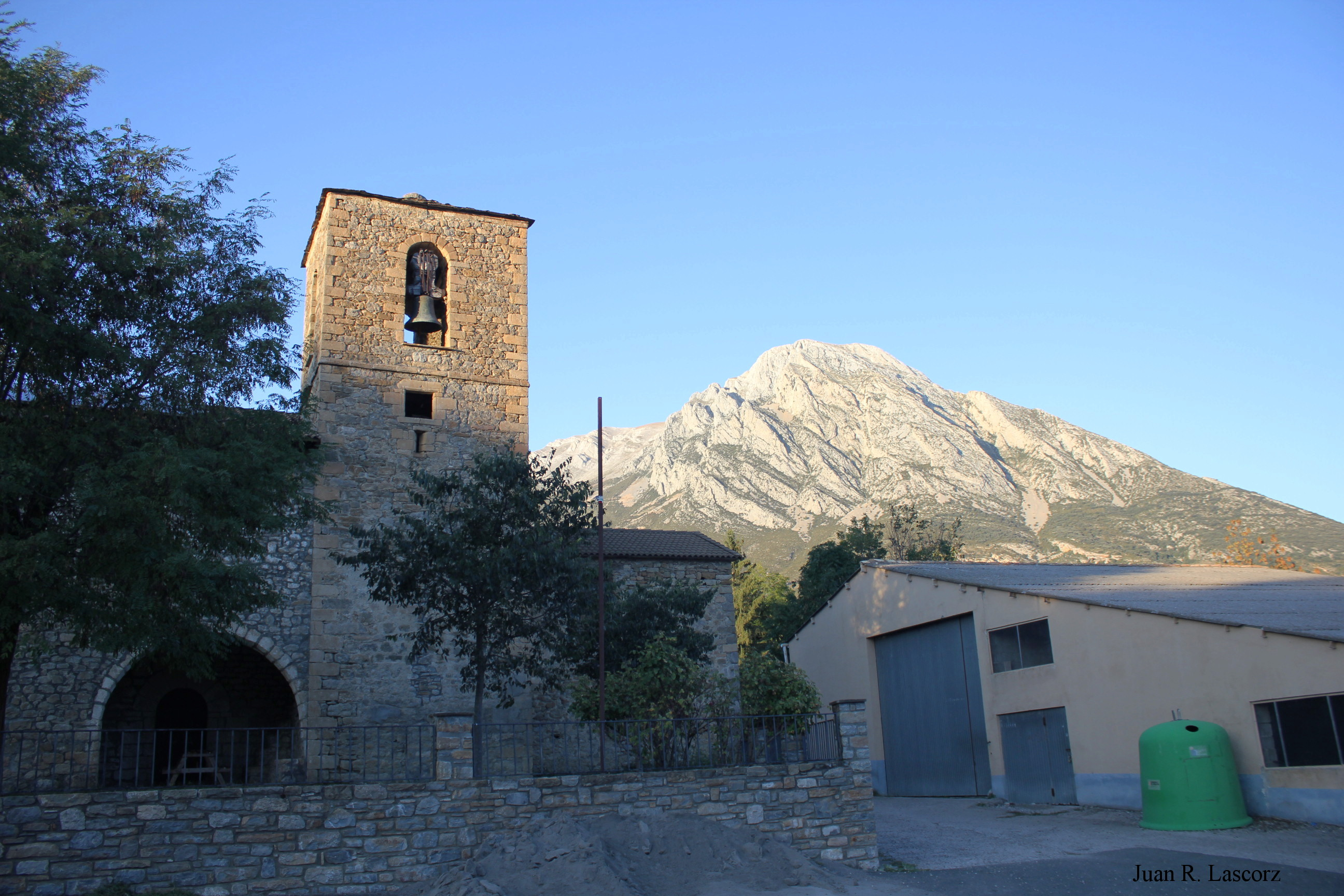
- Romanesque church in Valle de Lierp
- Interactive map of Valle de Lierp (Spanish)
- Country: Spain
- Autonomous community: Aragon
- Province: Huesca

Area
  - Total: 32 km^{2} (12 sq mi)

Population (2025-01-01)
  - Total: 52
  - Density: 1.6/km^{2} (4.2/sq mi)
- Time zone: UTC+1 (CET)
  - Summer (DST): UTC+2 (CEST)

Valle de Lierp (Spanish: [ˈbaʎe ðe ˈljeɾp]), in Ribagorçan and Aragonese: Val de Lierp, is a municipality located in the province of Huesca, in Aragon, Spain. According to the 2004 census (INE), the municipality has a population of 49 inhabitants.
