= Camporrélls =

Coordinates: 41°57′N 0°31′E

Camporrélls/Camporrells
- Coat of arms
- Interactive map of Camporrélls/Camporrells
- Country: Spain
- Autonomous community: Aragon
- Province: Huesca
- Municipality: Camporrélls/Camporrells

Area
  - Total: 26 km^{2} (10 sq mi)

Population (2025-01-01)
  - Total: 153
  - Density: 5.9/km^{2} (15/sq mi)
- Time zone: UTC+1 (CET)
  - Summer (DST): UTC+2 (CEST)

Camporrélls (Spanish: [kampoˈrels]) or Camporrells (Catalan: [kampoˈreʎs]) is a municipality located in the province of Huesca, Aragon, Spain. According to the 2004 census (INE), the municipality has a population of 231 inhabitants.

== See also ==
- List of municipalities in Huesca
