= Fuentespalda =

Fuentespalda/ Fontdespatla
- municipality
- Coat of arms

- Location of Fuentespalda/Fontdespatla within Aragon Location of Fuentespalda/Fontdespatla within Spain
- Coordinates: 40°48′N 0°4′E
- Country: Spain
- Autonomous community: Aragon
- Province: Teruel

Area
  - Total: 38 km^{2} (15 sq mi)
- Elevation: 712 m (2,336 ft)

Population (2025-01-01)
  - Total: 305
  - Density: 8.0/km^{2} (21/sq mi)
- Time zone: UTC+1 (CET)
  - Summer (DST): UTC+2 (CEST)

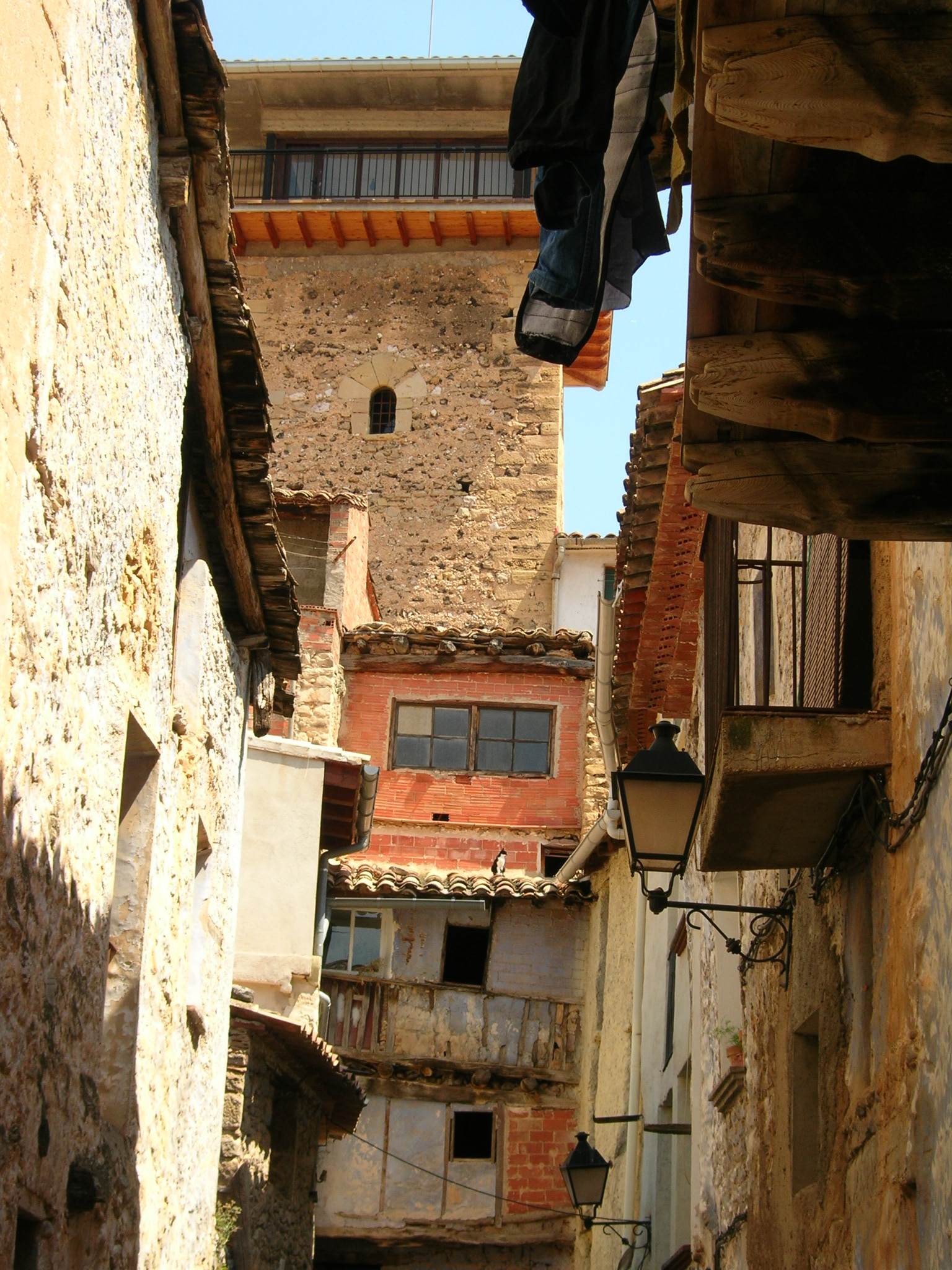
The tower protruding above Torre dels Moros (Fondespatla)

Fuentespalda (Spanish: [ˈfwentesˈpalda]) or Fontdespatla (Catalan: [ˌfɔndesˈpalːa]) is a municipality located in the Matarraña/Matarranya comarca, province of Teruel, Aragon, Spain. According to the 2004 census (INE), the municipality had a population of 368 inhabitants.

== See also ==
- List of municipalities in Teruel
