= La Codoñera =

La Codoñera/La Codonyera
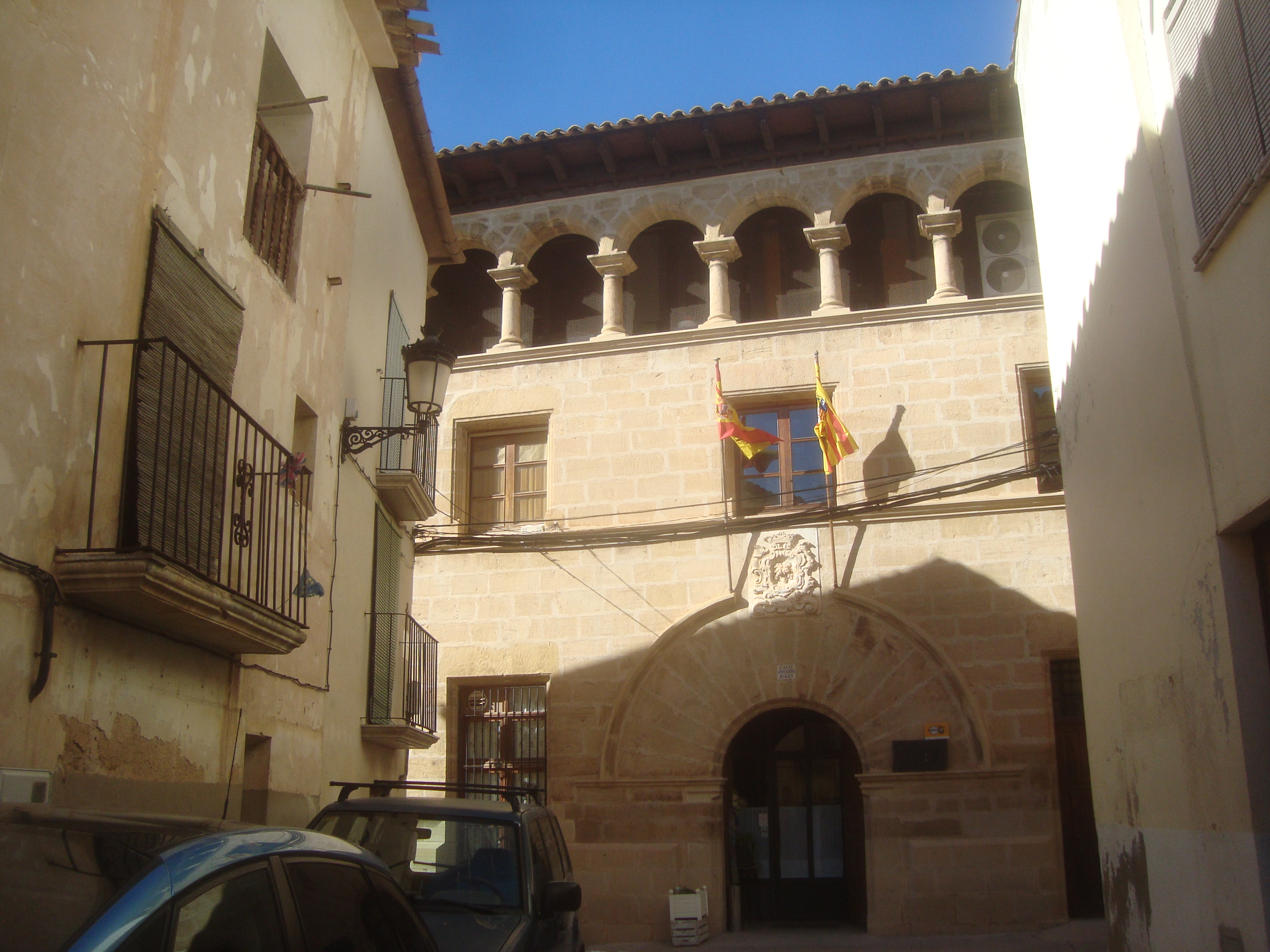
- Town hall

- Location of La Codoñera/La Codonyera within Aragon Location of La Codoñera/La Codonyera within Spain
- Coordinates: 40°56′N 0°5′W
- Country: Spain
- Autonomous community: Aragon
- Province: Teruel
- Municipality: La Codoñera/La Codonyera

Area
  - Total: 20.97 km^{2} (8.10 sq mi)
- Elevation: 499 m (1,637 ft)

Population (2025-01-01)
  - Total: 312
  - Density: 14.9/km^{2} (38.5/sq mi)
- Time zone: UTC+1 (CET)
  - Summer (DST): UTC+2 (CEST)

La Codoñera (Spanish pronunciation: [la koðoˈɲeɾa]) or La Codonyera (Catalan: [la koðoˈɲeɾa]) is a municipality located in the province of Teruel, Aragon, Spain. According to the 2004 census (INE), the municipality has a population of 340 inhabitants.

== See also ==
- List of municipalities in Teruel
