= Torre del Compte =

Torre del Compte/La Torre del Comte
- municipality
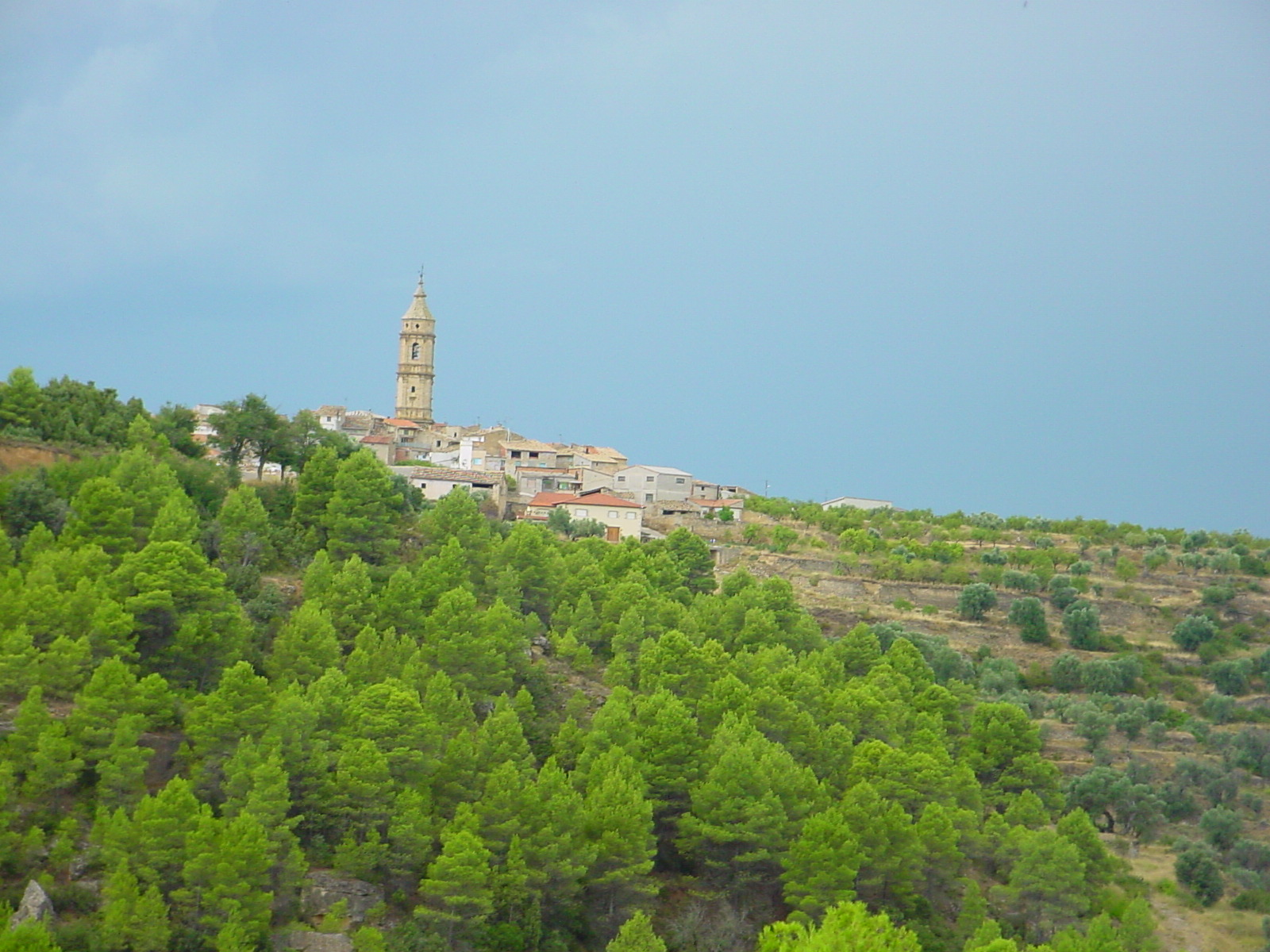

- Location of Torre del Compte/La Torre del Comte within Aragon Location of Torre del Compte/La Torre del Comte within Spain
- Coordinates: 40°56′N 0°7′W
- Country: Spain
- Autonomous community: Aragon
- Province: Teruel
- Municipality: Torre del Compte/La Torre del Comte

Area
  - Total: 19 km^{2} (7.3 sq mi)
- Elevation: 497 m (1,631 ft)

Population (2025-01-01)
  - Total: 120
  - Density: 6.3/km^{2} (16/sq mi)
- Time zone: UTC+1 (CET)
  - Summer (DST): UTC+2 (CEST)

Torre del Compte (Spanish: [ˈtore ðel ˈkonte]) or La Torre del Comte (Catalan: [la ˈtore ðel ˈkomte]) is a municipality located in the Matarraña/Matarranya, province of Teruel, Aragon, Spain. According to the 2004 census (INE), the municipality has a population of 169 inhabitants.

It is an eminently agricultural village and most of its inhabitants work in the fields. It is located next to the river Matarraña, with a narrow but fertile plain that produces cherries and peaches, with the mountains of Beceite in the background.

Its main monument is the Baroque church of San Pedro. It is a temple built in ashlar stone with three naves, of which the central one, together with the doorway, corresponds to the original church, in the Gothic style. The town hall, some noble houses and the remains of the city wall are also remarkable.

== See also ==
- List of municipalities in Teruel
