= Torre la Ribera =

Coordinates: 42.372°N 0.525°E

Torre la Ribera (Spanish) Tor-la-ribera (Catalan) Torlarribera (Aragonese)
- municipality
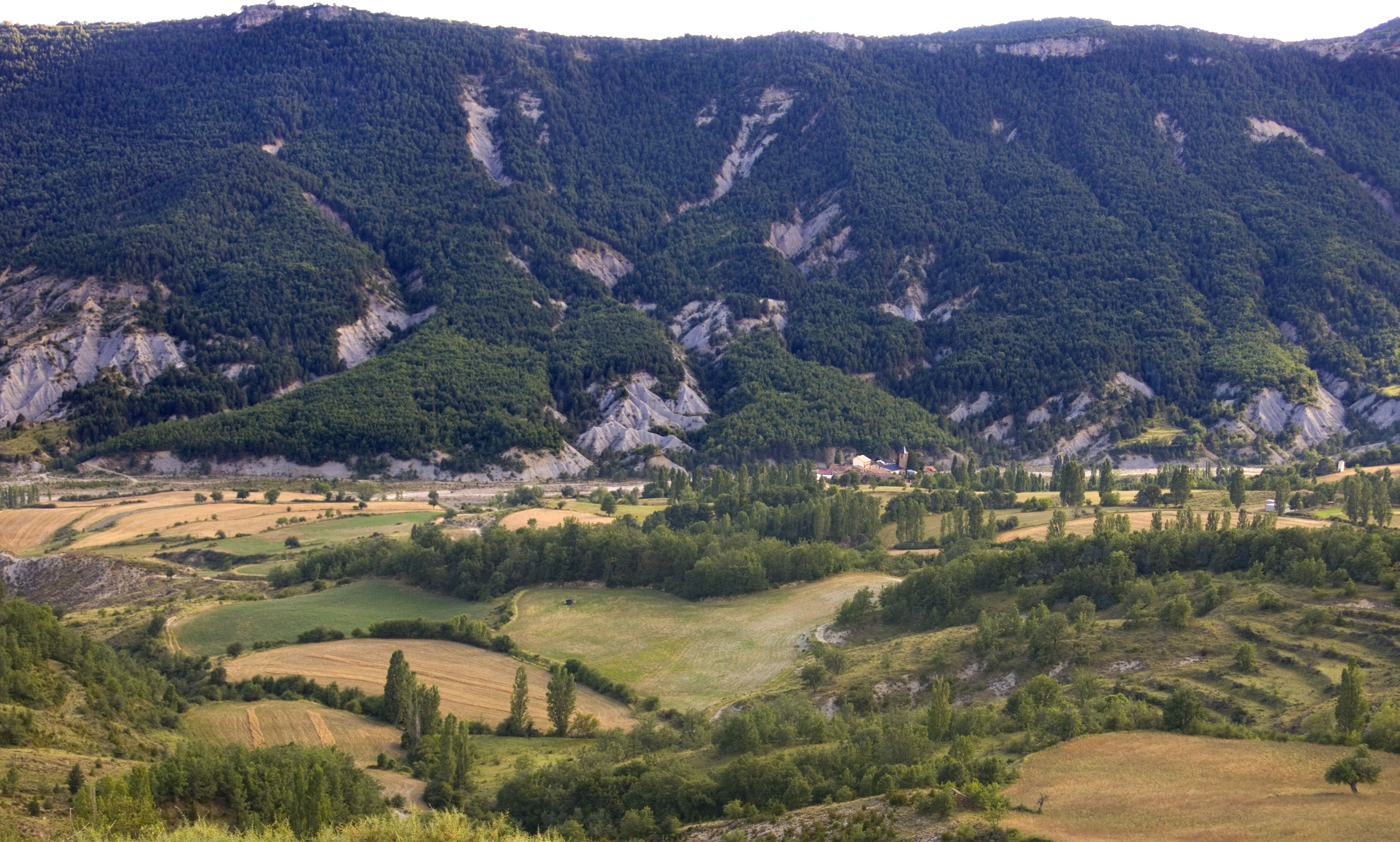
- Interactive map of Torre la Ribera (Spanish)
- Country: Spain
- Autonomous community: Aragon
- Province: Huesca
- Municipality: Torre la Ribera/ Tor-la-ribera

Area
  - Total: 31 km^{2} (12 sq mi)

Population (2025-01-01)
  - Total: 102
  - Density: 3.3/km^{2} (8.5/sq mi)
- Time zone: UTC+1 (CET)
  - Summer (DST): UTC+2 (CEST)

Torre la Ribera (Spanish: [ˈtore la riˈβeɾa]), in Catalan: Tor-la-ribera (locally [ˈtoɾ la riˈβeɾa]), or in Aragonese: Torlarribera, is a municipality located in the province of Huesca, Aragon, Spain. According to the 2004 census (INE), the municipality has a population of 117 inhabitants.
