= Bisaurri =

Bisaurri (Spanish) Bisaúrri (Benasquese) Bisaurri (Aragonese)
- Location within Spain Location within Aragon
- Coordinates: 42°30′N 0°31′E
- Country: Spain
- Autonomous community: Aragon
- Province: Huesca
- Municipality: Bisaurri/Bissaúrri/Bisagorri

Area
  - Total: 63 km^{2} (24 sq mi)

Population (2025-01-01)
  - Total: 177
  - Density: 2.8/km^{2} (7.3/sq mi)
- Time zone: UTC+1 (CET)
  - Summer (DST): UTC+2 (CEST)

Bisaurri (Spanish: [biˈsawri]), in Benasquese: Bisaúrri locally [bisaˈuri]) or in Aragonese: Bisagorri, is a municipality located in the province of Huesca, Aragon, Spain. According to the 2004 census (INE), the municipality has a population of 248 inhabitants.

== Els Trocs cave ==
Near modern Bisaurri is a cave known as Els Trocs, a significant archaeological site dating to the Neolithic era. Archaeological evidence indicates a struggle between two groups, in which the victims were early-migrating Neolithic farmers who clashed with local indigenous hunter-gatherers or rival herding groups over high-mountain pasture rights.

== See also ==
- List of municipalities in Huesca
