= Bajo Cinca/Baix Cinca =

Bajo Cinca/Baix Cinca Comarca del Bajo Cinca, Comarca del Baix Cinca
- Comarca
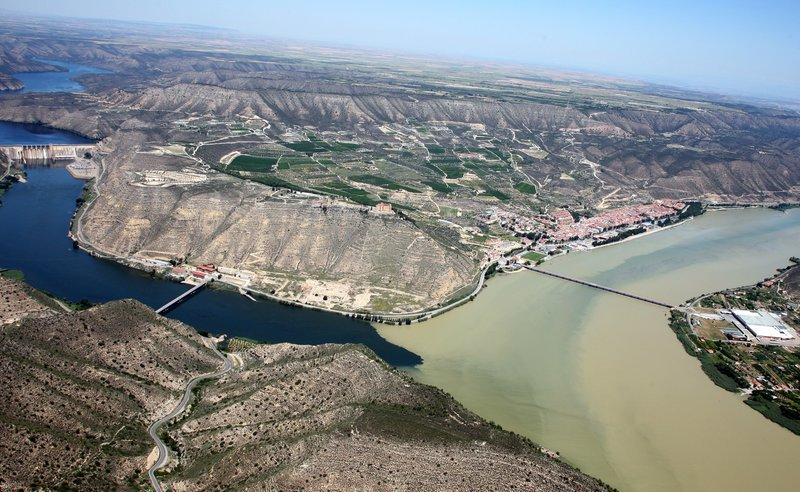
- Aerial view of Mequinenza

- Coordinates: 41°27′30″N 00°20′51″W
- Country: Spain
- Autonomous community: Aragon
- Province: Huesca; Zaragoza
- Capital: Fraga
- Time zone: UTC+1 (CET)
  - Summer (DST): UTC+2 (CEST)
- Largest municipality: Fraga
- Website: www.bajocinca.es

Bajo Cinca (Spanish: [ˈbaxo ˈθiŋka]) or Baix Cinca (Catalan: [ˈbaʃ ˈsiŋka]; Aragonese: Cinca Baxa, [ˈθiŋka ˈβajʃa]) is a comarca in eastern Aragon, Spain. It is named after river Cinca.

This comarca is located in the southeastern corner of the Huesca province. The administrative capital is Fraga, with 13,592 inhabitants the largest town of the comarca.

Bajo Cinca/Baix Cinca borders La Litera/La Llitera, Cinca Medio, Monegros and Bajo Aragón-Caspe/Baix Aragó-Casp in Aragon and Segrià and Ribera d'Ebre in Catalonia. About half of the comarca, including the two largest towns (Fraga and Mequinenza), belongs to the Catalan-speaking strip in eastern Aragon known as La Franja; some southern towns in the comarca can be part of the historical region of Lower Aragon.

== Municipal terms ==
The region includes the municipalities of Ballobar (Vallobar), Belver de Cinca (Bellver de Cinca), Candasnos, Chalamera (Xalamera), Fraga, Mequinenza (Mequinensa), Ontiñena (Ontinyena), Osso de Cinca (Ossó de Cinca), Torrente de Cinca (Torrent de Cinca), Velilla de Cinca (Vilella de Cinca) and Zaidín (Saidí). The 11 municipalities that comprise it are from the province of Huesca, with the exception of Mequinenza that belongs to Zaragoza.

== Geography ==
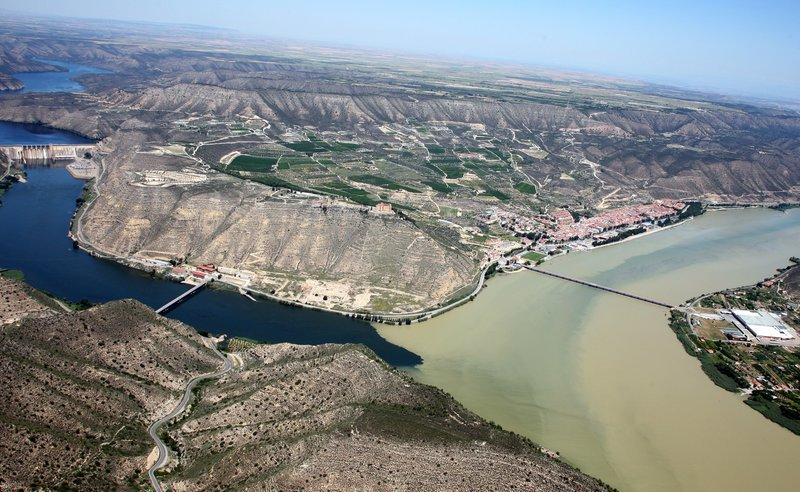
Aerial view of Aiguabarreig in Mequinenza

The Bajo / Baix Cinca limits to the east with the Autonomous Community of Catalonia, to the north with the Region of Cinca Medio and La Litera, to the west with the Monegros and to the south with the Bajo Aragón.

The region sits on the final stretch of the Cinca River, in the center of the Middle Ebro Depression, between the Zaragoza, Huesca and Lleida. The Cinca River, historical and cultural axis, divides the comarca asymmetrically and brings together almost all the villages, except Candasnos.

Its geography is characterized by the contrast of the fertile banks of the Ebro, Cinca and Segre and the arid land that extends outside the valleys. In recent years, irrigation has also been developed in rainfed areas, so that the landscape has been slightly modified to adapt it to agricultural needs.

Its relief has been the result of thousands of years of work in the Cinca River that, with the evolution of the years, was excavating its channel forming large and uneven terraces on both banks of its channel, which historically have been converted into fertile orchards.

The landscape is a natural heritage that the people of Bajo / Baix Cinca are committed to conserve. The contrast between the river banks full of greenery and the arid land of the Monegros offers an unparalleled variety of ecosystems. It can be found from fauna and flora with typical characteristics of the steppes and deserts to the enormous ornithological richness that abounds on the banks of the rivers. Of special natural importance is the one known as Aiguabarreig ("water mixture" in Catalan) that is formed in the final stretch of the confluence of the Cinca, Segre and Ebro rivers in Mequinenza.

== Climatography ==
The weather is continental with little rainfall, a fact that determines the vegetation of the area. The warmest months are July and August, when the temperature can reach 35 °C or sometimes up to 40 °C. On the other hand, in the cold months of December and January the temperatures range between 0 °C and −5 °C. The region receives the cold and dry wind called cierzo that descends along the Ebro valley.

The average rainfall level ranges between 300 and 400 mm, distributed very irregularly throughout the year. Prolonged periods of drought are common.

== Population ==
The socio-economic transformation experienced in Spain in the 1960s caused territorially a double current of emigration: from the interior areas to the periphery and from the rural to the urban centers. For the Bajo / Baix Cinca region, as for other areas of Aragon, it meant a strong depopulation of its rural nuclei and the concentration of a part of the population in the capital of the region.

The population of the region represents 11.03% of the total of the province of Huesca. The proportion between men and women is quite homogeneous. Fraga is where most of the population is concentrated, followed by Mequinenza with almost 9.64% of the comarca's total. All municipalities have a historical decrease with the exception of Fraga.

== Economy ==
The Bajo / Baix Cinca region is one of the most dynamic regions in Aragon, mainly promoted by the agricultural sector. The percentage of the population employed in agriculture with respect to the total is 25.5%, creating an important added value in the sweet fruit sector. The Bajo / Baix Cinca is the Aragonese region with the most cultivated hectares in this sector. The Bajo / Baix Cinca has always been an agricultural area for two fundamental reasons: the first one because traditionally and culturally it has been associated to the countryside and the second one due to the weather factor and the low rainfall rate. It is a very important sector with a considerable increase in production due to the modernization of agricultural holdings and the increase of the Mequinenza irrigable area, reaching more than 3,000 hectares. Mequinenza has become a regional engines that leads this sector mainly dedicated to peach, cherry, olive and almond.

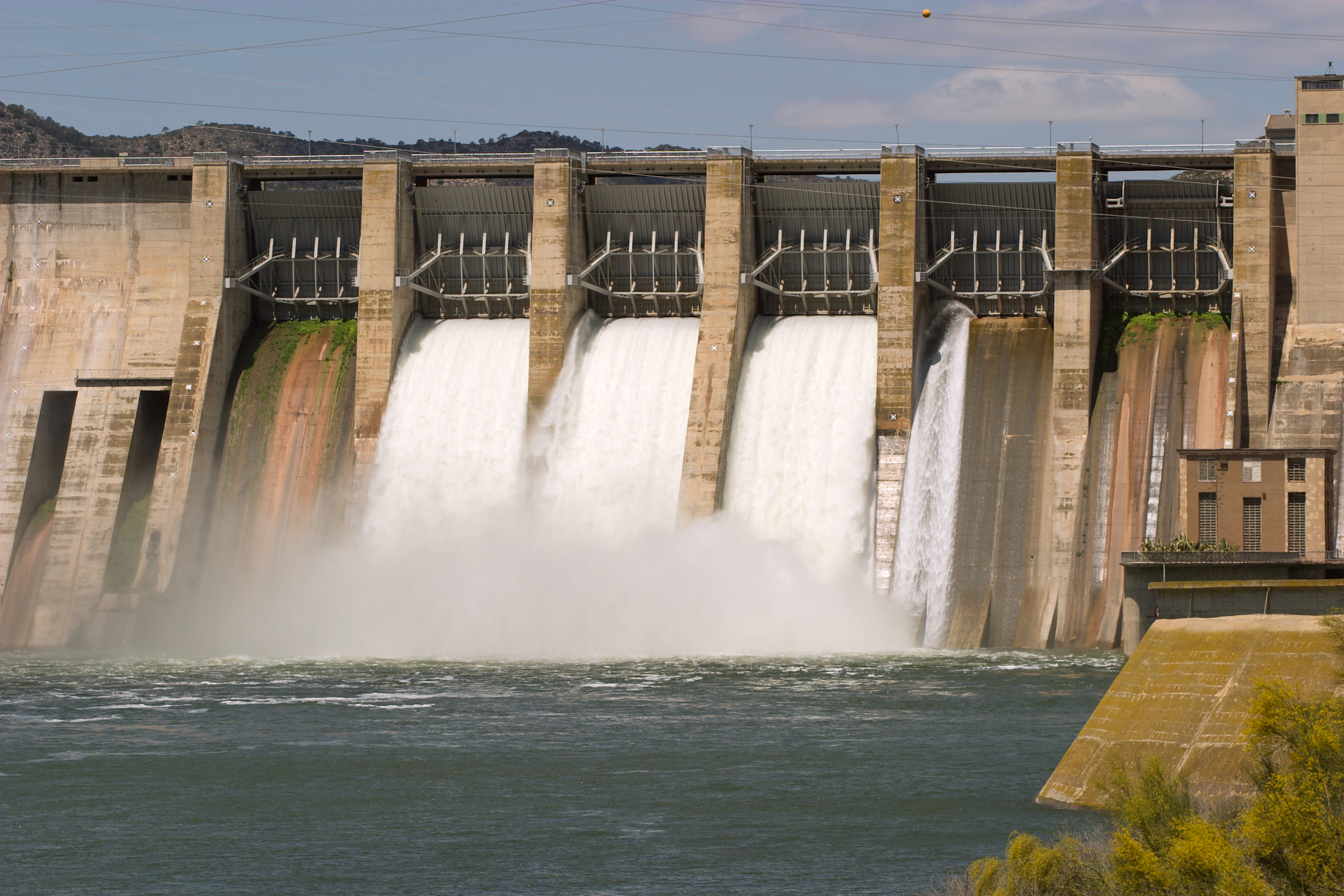
Mequinenza Dam, also known as "Mar de Aragón"

Industry in Bajo / Baix Cinca is based mainly on industrial activities. The agrobusiness sector has a high percentage of companies, and its prominence in relation to direct and indirect employment is very significant. Services sector is also relevant for the economy of the area, representing the second source of income for the population, with a special importance of the tourism sector in areas such as Mequinenza that have numerous companies of active tourism, sport fishing and cultural tourism that attract both national and international visitors throughout the year.

Historically, the energy production sector has been concentrated also in Mequinenza. Initially, in 1850s it was with the coal extraction from the Mequinenza coal basin for more than 150 years and later with the construction of hydroelectric reservoirs of Mequinenza (also known as "Mar de Aragón") and Riba-roja.

== History ==
The Comarca del Bajo / Baix Cinca is located in a privileged and strategic position that has made it a meeting place for civilizations, cultures and languages. It is crossed by the Cinca river, to which it owes its name, a river that receives the waters of the Alcanadre and finally joins the Segre river that ends up depositing its waters in the Ebro river in Mequinenza.

The region treasures numerous vestiges of prehistoric villages (such as the archaeological sites of Castellets or Riols in Mequinenza) Iberians, Ibero-Romans, Romans (such as Villa Fortunatus in Fraga), Visigoths, Arabs, Jews and Christians. The result of this is a mixture of Romanesque, Gothic and Mudejar art that invades the heritage of an ancient region.

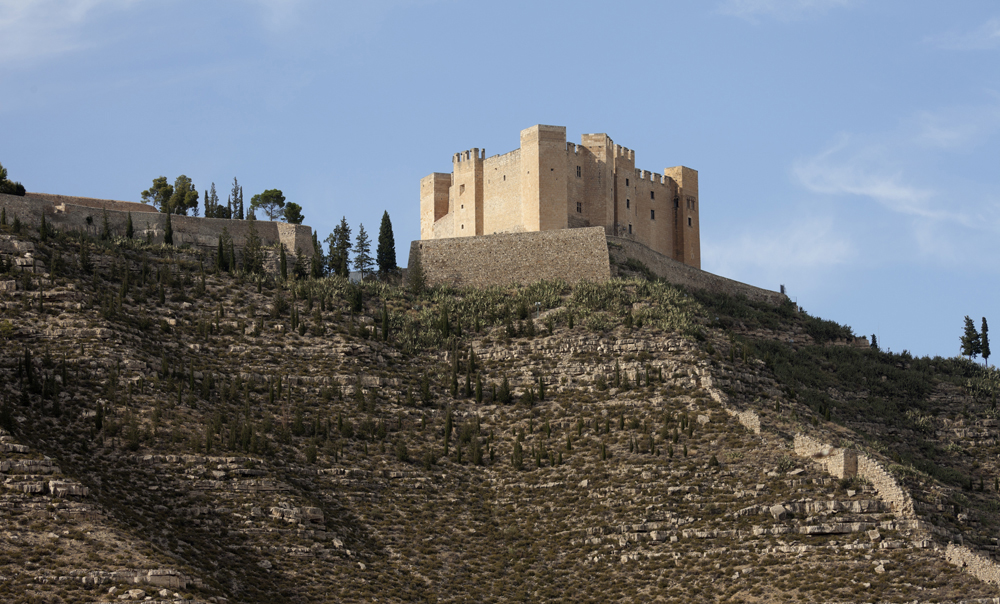
Castle of Mequinenza

They are declared Sites of Cultural Interest in the category of archaeological zone: Villa Fortunatus and El Pilaret de Santa Quiteria in Fraga, Mas de Fayonet I, Vallbufandes, Valmayor I, Valmayor IV in Mequinenza, and El castellazo in Ballobar. In the category of monument are the Tower of the Friars, the Tower of the Pilaret of Santa Quiteria and the San Miguel church in Fraga, the Cross of Escarpe and the Castle of Mequinenza in Mequinenza, the castle of Zaidín, the Hermitage of Santa María in Chalamera and the Castle of Torrente de Cinca. In addition, the region has three museums in Mequinenza (grouped in the Museums of Mequinenza) and two located in Fraga as the House Museum of Salvador Sabaté and the Palace of Montcada.

== Culture and heritage ==
=== Castle of Mequinenza ===
The castle stands at the edge of a great cliff overlooking the confluence of the Ebro, Segre and Cinca rivers. It is structured as an irregular quadrilateral building with seven rectangular and one pentagonal towers. Two towers flank the small semicircular door protected by a portico. Few fortresses around the world have a militarily strategic location such as the Castle of Mequinenza, contemplating an extensive landscape on the confluence of the three rivers and their surrounding lands until reaching the region of the Pyrenees at the horizon. The noble family of Moncada, lords of the barony of Mequinenza, chose this eagle's nest to create a castle-palace fortification. The building is an primary example of Gothic architecture associated with the Crown of Aragon. Its structures are dated from the 14th and 15th centuries.

According to the arab chronicler and cartographer Al Idrisi, The localities that today comprises the castle were once an fortress recorded as "Maknesa", built by the Berber tribe of the Miknasa during the 13th century. The tribe established the town and also gave its original name. During the Reconquista, it fell to Count Ramón Berenguer IV of Barcelona. After becoming a crown possession, the settlement was given to the noble family of Moncada. One of the great sieges of the castle took place during the Peninsular War, when it was taken by French Napoleonic troops under the leadership of Marshal Suchet, which resulted in it being directly controlled by the French government until 1814. "Mequinenza" was inscribed in large letters on one of the outer columns of the Arc de Triomphe in Paris to commemorate one of the great French victories in the Iberian Peninsula.

Currently the castle is privately owned by the ENDESA Foundation. In order to visit the castle it is necessary to put in a request in advance at the Tourist Office of the City Council of Mequinenza. Guided free tours are held on Tuesday mornings with prior request.

=== Museums of Mequinenza ===
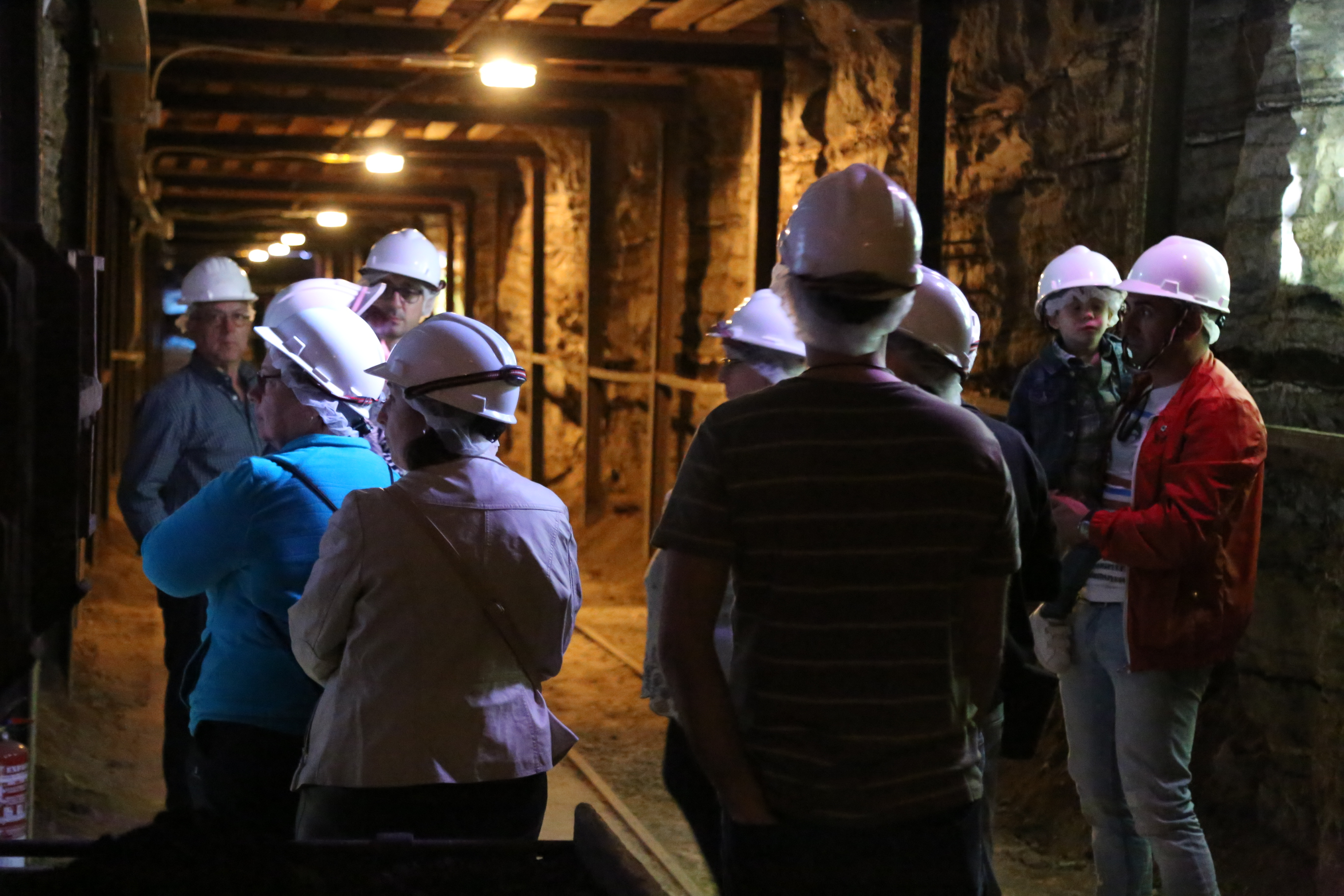
Mine Museum of Mequinenza

In the Museums of Mequinenza it is possible to explore an underground coal mining gallery with more than 1000 meters in the Museum of the Mine, explore the history of the population until the disappearance of the old town under the waters of the Ebro river in the Museum of History or discover how was the Prehistory in the Museum of the Prehistoric Past. Inaugurated in 2010, they are located in the old Maria Quintana School Group, the old schools of the town built in 1929.

=== Old Town of Mequinenza ===
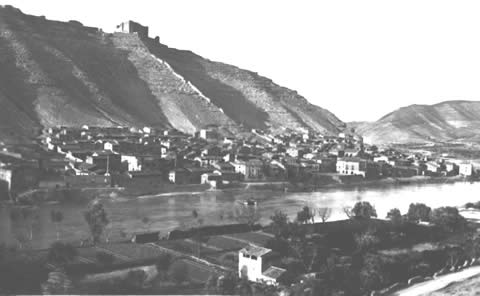
Old Town of Mequinenza

The old town of Mequinenza was located on the left bank of the Ebro River, just at the point where they converge with the waters of Segre and Cinca. It was demolished almost completely during the construction of the Ribarroja reservoir. It constituted an urban nucleus with characteristics of the localities of the lower section of the Ebro, with an urban plot dating back to the Muslim era.

With the franquismo and the arrival of the ENHER company and the construction of the Mequinenza and Riba-roja dams, life changed for the old town on the banks of the Ebro. The industries began to close due to the significant increase in the water level of the waters and the population began to demand alternatives to the flooding of the urban nucleus. Thus began an exodus for the inhabitants of Mequinenza who had to leave their homes to move to a new population.

Part of the ancient population of Mequinenza can be visited today because it has become a large outdoor memory park. The original paths of the streets and houses that were above the water level have been recovered from the runes. The old Mequinenza, the "Old Town", is an invitation to walk through the memory of its streets and alleys, to rediscover part of the old Church, to imagine the old docks and to know a thousand stories, curiosities and legends from a millenary and historic town of navigators and miners on the banks of the Ebro river.

=== Jesús Moncada and "The towpath" ===
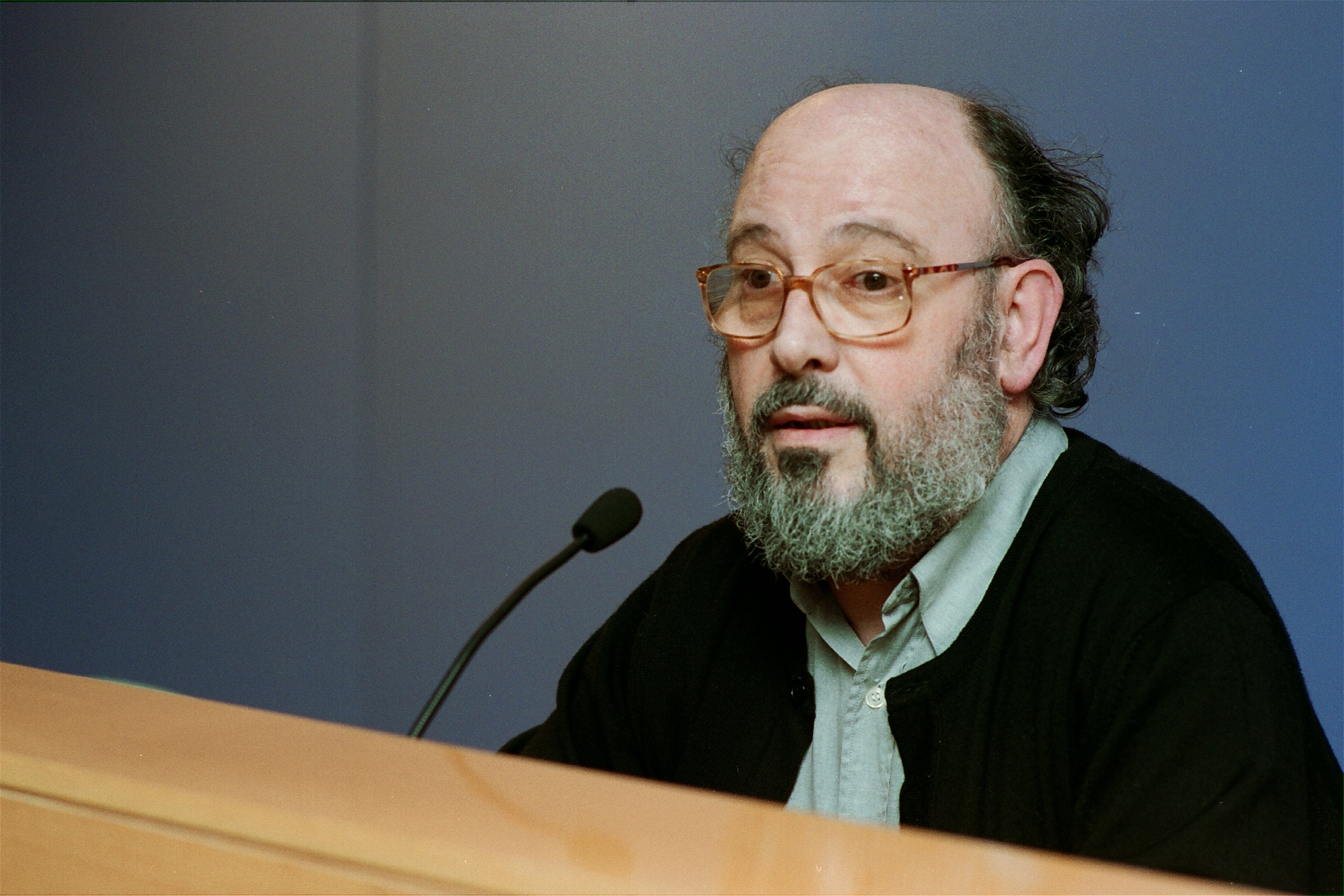
Jesús Moncada

Mequinenza is also a reference point for literature lovers. Jesús Moncada, the most universal writer from Mequinenza, turned the old village into the main location of the many personal stories told in his books. His novel Camí de Sirga ("The Towpath") was translated into more than 20 languages (including Japanese, Swedish and Vietnamese). It is an amalgam of characters and stories from ancient Mequinenza and its tragic disappearance.

He is considered one of the most important authors in Catalan language of his time. He received several awards for all his works, among others the City of Barcelona Award or the National Critics Award in 1989 for "Camí de sirga" or the Creu de Sant Jordi granted by the Generalitat of Catalonia in 2001. In 2004 he received the Aragonese Letters Prize.

=== Ramón J. Sender ===
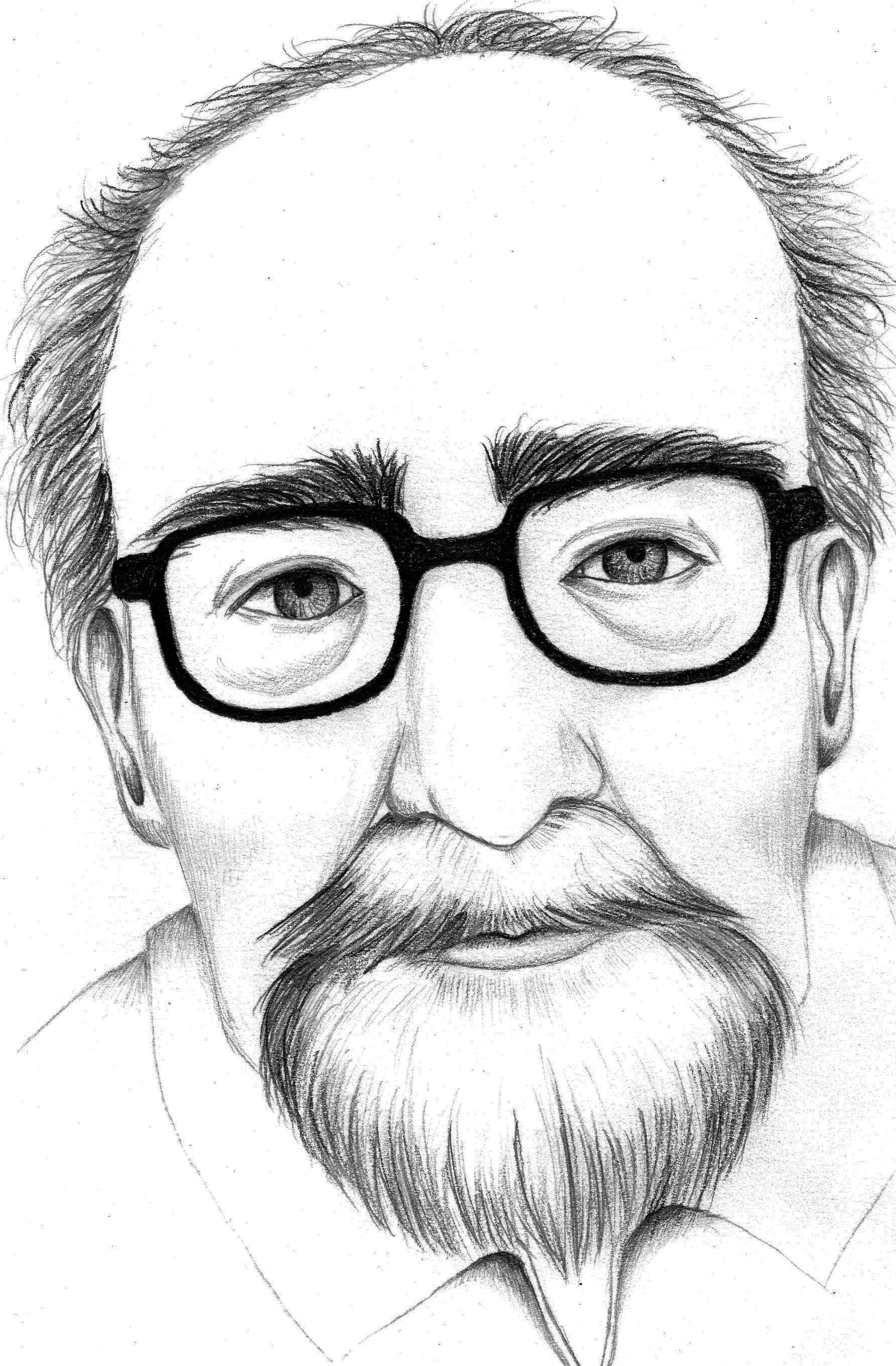
Ramon J. Sender

Ramón José Sender Garcés was a Spanish novelist, essayist and journalist born in Chalamera in 1901. Several of his works were translated into English by the distinguished zoologist, Sir Peter Chalmers Mitchell, including "Seven Red Sundays" ("Siete domingos rojos"), "Mr Witt Among the Rebels" ("Mr Witt en el cantón") and "The War in Spain" ("Contraataque").

=== Bilingual zone ===
The Bajo / Baix Cinca region is bilingual. The municipalities of Mequinenza, Torrente de Cinca, Velilla de Cinca and Zaidín are mostly Catalan speakers while Fraga brings together a similar percentage of Catalan-speaking and Spanish-speaking population. The municipalities of Ballobar, Belver de Cinca, Candasnos, Chalamera, Ontiñena and Osso de Cinca are Spanish speakers.

More than 80% of the inhabitants of Bajo / Baix Cinca speak Western Catalan. The successive civilizations that passed throughout history through this territory left their culture and also their language. In this sense, the Catalan landed in this territory at the time of the Reconquest initiated by Ramón Berenguer IV who repopulated this region with people coming from the Ribagorza, the Pallars and the Urgel. The language has survived to the present in its oral variant. The majority of its inhabitants are bilingual in Spanish - the language in which all primary and secondary education are received - and also in Catalan.

==== Declaration of Mequinenza ====
The Declaration of Mequinenza (Declaració de Mequinensa in Catalan) is a document signed on 1 February 1984 in Mequinenza (Bajo / Baix Cinca, Aragon, Spain) by the mayors of 17 municipalities of the Aragonese Catalan-speaking area together with José Bada Paniello (Minister of Culture of Government of Aragon at the time). Following the declaration, and complying with one of the proposals contained therein, on 1 October 1985, an agreement between the Government of Aragon and the Ministry of Education and Science for the teaching of education would be signed and published in the Official Gazette of Aragon Catalan language as a voluntary and evaluable subject in schools in the area.

== Nature heritage ==
The dominant plants in the region are Mediterranean species adapted to drought and harsh weather conditions. They are little demanding plants, of great geological breadth such as "carrasco" pine, "coscoja", rosemary or thyme. The fauna is linked to the steppe, riverside and desert areas of Monegros. The water turtle, the ocellated lizard or the southern snake are the main ones in terms of amphibians and reptiles. Mammals include hedgehogs, rodents and bats that live next to foxes, rabbits and deer. The Bajo / Baix Cinca has six Special Protection Areas for Birds: El Basal, Las Menorcas and Llanos de Cardiel; el Pas and Santa Rita Reservoir; La Retuerta and las Saladas; the Aiguabarreig in Mequinenza and the Sierra de Alcubierre and Valcuerna, Serreta Negra and Liberola. In these places it is possible to observe birds such as the vultures, partridge eagles, bustards and royal herons.

== Tourism ==
=== Fishing ===
One of the most peculiar species that can be found in Mequinenza is catfish. It has become its largest habitat in Spain. Mequinenza has become an international place of reference for fishing enthusiasts from all over Spain and abroad (mainly Germans, French, English, Americans and Japanese), willing to face a fish whose characteristics have already made it mythical, achieving catches of 250 centimeters and more than one hundred kilograms of weight. Other species such as common carp, pike perch, blackbass or bathrobes can also be found. About 30 sport fishing competitions are held every year in the Mequinenza reservoir.

=== Nautical sports ===
Mequinenza has a race course considered one of the best in Spain for its excellent accessibility, its stable sheet of water and its sports facilities on the banks of the reservoir. In the calm waters of its reservoir it is possible to practice many sports. The rowing teams of Oxford and Cambridge, and other rowing national teams, choose Mequinenza as a place to do their preparation stages.

=== Active tourism ===
Mequinenza is the locality that registers a greater number of companies of active tourism and adventure of the province of Zaragoza and the fifth at the level of Aragon. The companies of active tourism and adventure are identified with a logo that represents a wind rose on a yellow background and the signature granted by the Government of Aragon. It is about guaranteeing visitors by offering quality standards, something that in the case of Mequinenza is highly valued, a fact that has made the town a benchmark for fishing in Europe and the preferred destination of many international fishermen.

== Gastronomy ==
The Bajo / Baix Cinca is an area of orchards, where there is an abundance of fresh fruit and quality nuts, something that is collected in traditional desserts such as elmostillo, farinosos, pumpkin dumplings, Fraga coc or dried figs. Huerta and sheep are also basic in the dishes of the area with special importance on game meat such as rabbit, hare, partridge, wild boar and deer.

The Bajo / Baix Cinca provides a unique space for viticulture that can be found north of the region, specifically in the municipality of Belver de Cinca. Another of the historical ingredients and with greater tradition of the region are the olive oils of the Arbequina variety (of mild, aromatic flavor, and with fruity touches) and Empeltre (of soft and sweet flavor, less intense than the Arbequina variety). Several companies in the area have been awarded in numerous national and international competitions. Historically, the Arabs called the lower course of the Cinca River as "river of the olive trees" ("Nahr al-Zaytún") term that was incorporated in the toponyms of some localities like Mequinenza, then known as Miknasa al- Zaytun.

Mequinenza cherry is particularly appreciated since the area offers a microclimate that allows to obtain the first open-field cherry productions from all over Europe offering cherries with exceptional organoleptic qualities both in hardness and color and in sweetness. The earliest varieties are destined for the international market in central and northern Europe, for the Emirates or even for Asia. Likewise, varieties of peach, nectarine, grape, Paraguayan or platerina can also be found.

== Traditions ==
El Bajo / Baix Cinca is a frontier land where many traditions that live in full bloom survive. The Major Festivities of each municipality, become one of the great festive axes although the parties are distributed throughout the year. In Fraga, the figure of "les de faldetes" is typical, a holiday that pays tribute to this typical costume of the Bajocinqueña town as well as the offering to the Virgen del Pilar. In the other municipalities, celebrations such as the San Roque festivities in Ballobar, the Holy Week processions of Belver de Cinca, the distribution of the rosqueta in Candasnos, Easter Mondays or the pilgrimage to the hermitage of San Marcos are also celebrated. in Chalamera, the celebrations of Santa Agatoclia de Mequinenza, the celebrations of Santa Reliquia in Ontiñena, the equestrian concentration of Bajo / Baix Cinca in the month of June in Osso de Cinca, the verbena of San Juan in Torrente de Cinca, the celebrations of San Lorenzo in Velilla de Cinca or the feasts of the Virgin of the Assumption in Zaidín.

The "Fiestas de San Blas and Santa Águeda" that are celebrated in Mequinenza (Zaragoza) on the first weekend of February were declared in 2018 as Fiesta of Tourist Interest of Aragon with code F.I.T.A. Number 844.

== Notable people born in Bajo / Baix Cinca ==
- Raúl Agné (Mequinenza, 1970), football coach
- Francisco Antonio Cosme Bueno (Belver de Cinca, 1711 - Lima, Peru 1798), cosmograph
- Jesús Moncada (Mequinenza, 1941 - Barcelona, 2005), writer awarded the City of Barcelona Prize (1989), the National Critics Award (1989), Cruz de Sant Jordi (2001) and Aragonese Letters Award (2004) for his literary career that mostly deals with the old town of Mequinenza and his work Camí de Sirga
- Francisco de Moncada y Cardona (Mequinenza, 1532 - Valencia, 1594), noble and statesman, I Marquis de Aytona, IX count of Ossona, Great of Spain, viceroy of Catalonia and Valencia
- Juan Carlos Oliva (Mequinenza 1965), international football coach
- Ramón José Sender Garcés (Chalamera, 1901 - San Diego, California 1982), Aragonese writer

== See also ==
- Cinca Medio
- La Franja
