= Aiguabarreig (Mequinenza) =

Natural space in Mequinenza, Aragon, Spain

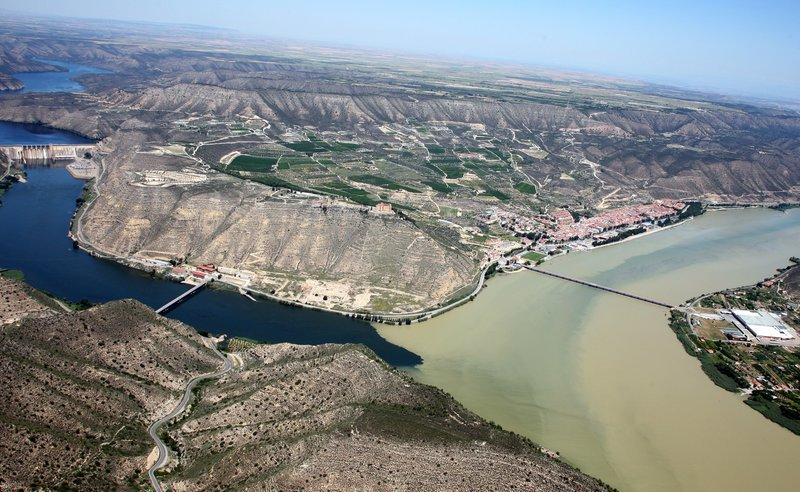
Aiguabarreig in Mequinenza.

Aiguabarreig is a natural space with great importance as an area of reproduction, wintering and resting of migratory fauna located in Mequinenza (Bajo Cinca, Aragón, Spain). It constitutes the largest river confluence of the Iberian Peninsula (with the union of Ebro, Segre and Cinca rivers) and one of the largest in all Europe. Is considered as one of the greatest biological natural spaces of Aragon.

== Name ==
The term "Aiguabarreig" comes from the Catalan word that designates the mixture of waters in the place where two or more streams of water meet and form one. The Aiguabarreig Segre-Cinca-Ebro is formed at the time that the Cinca river brings its water to the Segre river, in the municipal area of La Granja d'Escarp, and then they arrive to the Ebro river, already in Mequinenza.

== Geography ==
Territorially, it is located in the center of the Ebro Valley. It borders to the west with the Monegros, to the east with Almatret and to the south with the Ribarroja reservoir. This great natural space is divided between two autonomous communities (Aragon and Catalonia) and also in two regions; Segrià for Catalonia and Bajo / Baix Cinca in Aragon. Segre and Cinca form a first Aiguabarreig between the towns of La Granja d'Escarp, Massalcoreig and Torrente de Cinca. A few kilometers later, the waters of Segre and Cinca converge with the waters of the Ebro, in the municipality of Mequinenza.

Aiguabarreig of Mequinenza is controlled by the Matarranya-Aiguabarreig Special Protection Area which has a length of 36,821 ha, of which 7,417.26 ha are located in the municipality of Mequinenza. The Special Protection Area encompasses the central area of the Aiguabarreig, from the south of Torrente de Cinca, all the Mequinenza river area to the junction with the Matarraña river in the homonymous region.

== Landscape ==
Inside Aiguabarreig we find hundreds of meters of water width, with numerous river islands and riverside forests, of the largest in the Ebro area, large masses of reed bed, pebble beaches and "galachos". It is also the point of confluence of the steppe flora, from the arid zone of Monegros and the Mediterranean flora that ascends through the Ebro valley, including some elements of the mountain. The intertwined connection of river banks and lagoons with an arid and Mediterranean environment where vertical cliffs abound and at the same time fruit trees give this exceptional biological richness.

The landscape has a great contrast between the great wetland that forms the junction of the Ebro, Segre and Cinca rivers and the surrounding aridity, a circumstance that makes this place a strategic point for many birds, whether to winter, to reproduce or as stopping point in the long migratory route. The fact of being located in the middle of the Ebro depression and the proximity of the Delta Natural Park allow the Aiguabarreig to become an extraordinary biological connector.

=== Vegetation ===
In the Aiguabarreig there is repopulated vegetation of Pinus halepensis. There is also presence of Rosmarinus officinalis and some thermophilic species, being frequent that diverse feet or small masses of Quercus coccifera or Juniperus phoenicea appear in its bosom. There are also some characteristic species such as Populus alba, Salix alba or Tamarix gallica, and helophytes such as Phragmites australis or Typha domingensis.

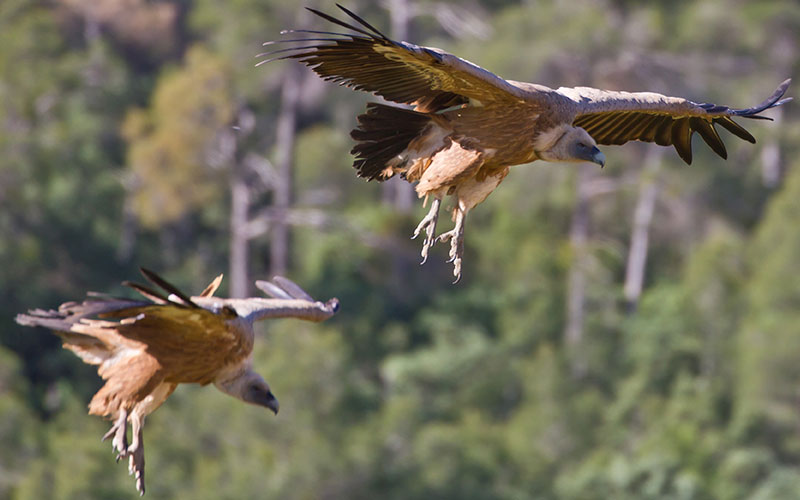
Gyps fulvus in Mequinenza.

Thanks to these characteristics, species from very opposite environments coexist where birds are the most prominent group, ranging from colonies of Ardeidae, in the fluvial islands, to all types of birds of pray, as well as birds typical of desert environments, including an extensive representation of species scarce and threatened in Europe. Other well represented faunal groups are: reptiles, amphibians and mammals, the latter, with an extraordinary representation of different species of bats, an abundant population of deer, roe deer, presence of the otter and the increasingly abundant of wild goat, being able to reach and to observe them from the same town or in the castle of Mequinenza. The endemisms are notable in the entomofauna and within the waters, together with the Naiads, subsist with difficulty (due to the effects of the reservoirs and the introduction of fish species for sporting purposes) populations of native fish such as the "fraret".

The accumulation of sediments in the Ribarroja reservoir has allowed to form different islands between the first confluences of the Segre and the Cinca in recent years until reaching the Ebro, already in the Aragonese population of Mequinenza. Among them, it is worth highlighting the Illa dels Martinets that has become over the years an important nesting colony for many species of Ardeidae, such as the egret, the great egret, the little egret, the little bittern and the Black-crowned night heron. During the recent years, was possible to find between the masses of reed Squacco heron and Eurasian bittern.

The riverside forests and the well-preserved and large-scale reeds host an ornithic population, interesting and well nourished, which can be observed throughout the year, taking advantage of the different phases of this ecosystem; Rail (bird), Pythidae, Thrush (bird), Tit (bird), Finch, Bunting (bird). In the steppe environment we will find: Little bustard, Black-bellied sandgrouse, Pin-tailed sandgrouse, European roller, Greater short-toed lark and Mediterranean short-toed lark. Some of the most emblematic species in the areas of transition are Western Orphean warbler, Spectacled warbler, Blue rock thrush, Black wheatear and western black-eared wheatear. Among the reeds are species such as Calopteryx virgo, Sympetrum flaveolum, Ishnura pumilio and even Anax imperator.

Finally, highlight the escarpments, characteristic of the Ebro Valley, and that undoubtedly house a large group of riparian species, especially birds of pray, being able to observe many of them without great difficulty, including some of them with a great conservation interest, at national and regional level:Griffon vulture, Egyptian vulture, Golden eagle, Bonelli's eagle, Booted eagle, Short-toed snake eagle, Common buzzard, Western marsh harrier, Black kite, Red kite, Peregrine falcon and Eurasian eagle-owl.

The amphibians and reptiles identified in the Aiguabarreig are Common midwife toad, Pelobates cultripes, Common parsley frog, Common toad, Natterjack toad, Perez's frog, Spanish pond turtle, European pond turtle, Tarentola mauritanica, Acanthodactylus erythrurus, Ocellated lizard, Podarcis hispanicus, Psammodromus algirus, Psammodromus hispanicus, Ladder snake, Coronella girondica, Malpolon monspessulanus and Natrix maura.

== Cultural Heritage ==
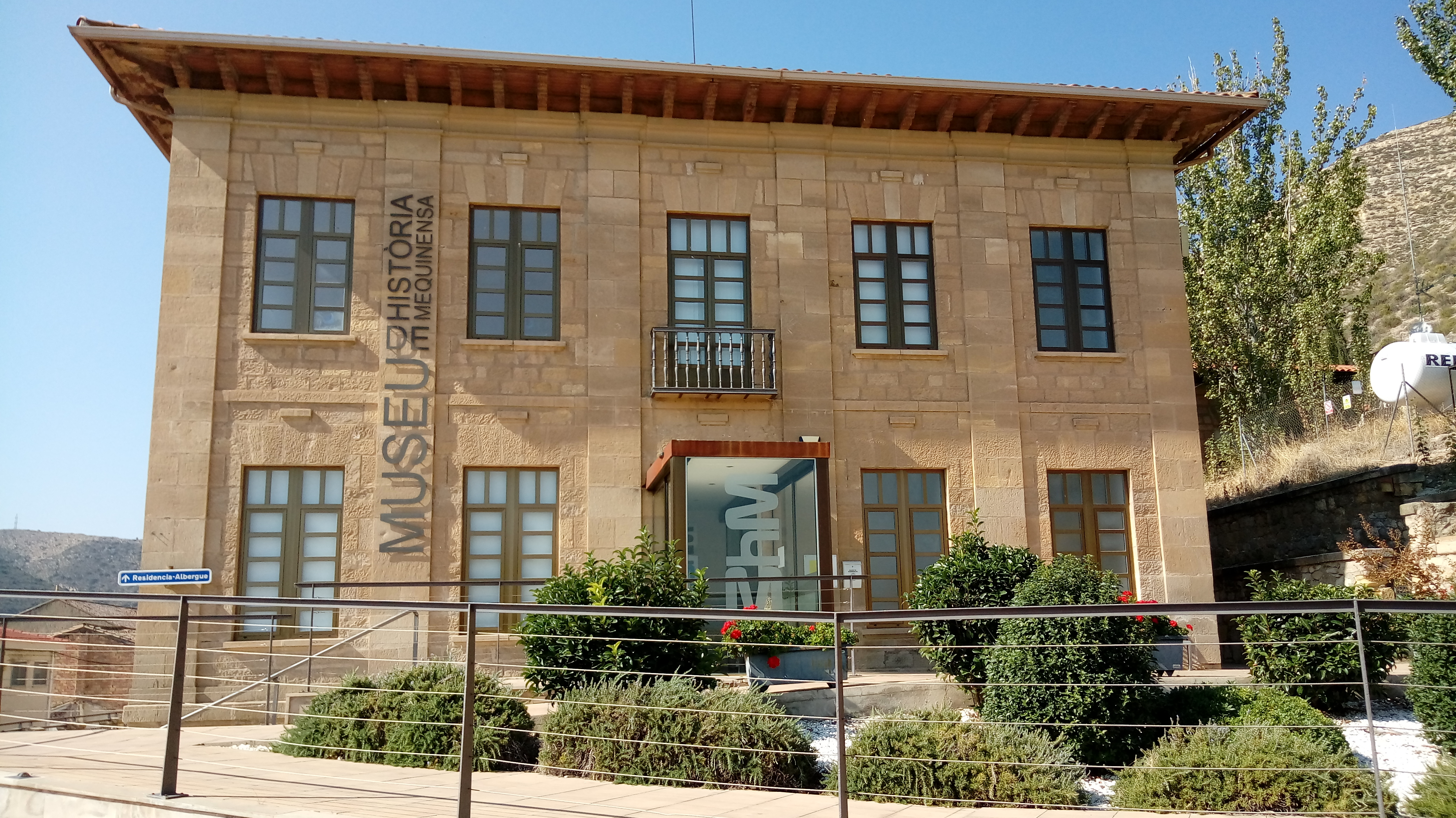
History Museum of Mequinenza.

Sport fishing and navigation are two of the most frequent activities. The Aiguabarreig is, thanks to fishing, an international point of interest with hundreds of fishermen, particularly Central Europeans, who visit these rivers every year and enjoy the extensive network of existing offers around this activity. The species of introduced fish, of great attraction for the fisherman, are especially the black bass, the pike-perch or the well-known catfish. We must not forget the hundreds of naturalists who visit the area every year, attracted by its great biological diversity, particularly birdwatchers. The surroundings of the Aiguabarreig is marked by the coalfield of Mequinenza and the more than 150 years of mining history in the town. The extraction of lignites and their transport has marked the villages of Aiguabarreig, given its close link with the rivers. Symbol are the extinct "llauts", boats that held together the people and culture of all the riverside villages. You can still see different spaces of mining industrial heritage around the rivers whose waters served to transport coal in typical Mequinenza vessels known as "llauts".

Museums of Mequinenza focus on the mining and historical heritage of the Old Town of Mequinenza that was demolished and flooded under the waters of the Ebro River after the construction of the Ribarroja and Mequinenza reservoirs. In the Museum of the Mine you can visit an authentic coal mine of more than a kilometer of interior route with historical material and machines that have been used for the extraction of coal for more than 150 years in the mining basin of Mequinenza. In the Museum of the History of Mequinenza you can explore the past of the population, from Prehistory to the demolition of the old town of Mequinenza as well as a space dedicated to the mequinenzano writer Jesús Moncada.

Castle of Mequinenza stands almost on the edge of a great steep right at the confluence of the Ebro, Segre and Cinca rivers in Mequinenza. Its plant is an irregular quadrilateral, with seven rectangular towers except one, the most robust, which is pentagonal. Few fortresses will have a better location than this one, contemplating an extensive and impressive landscape over the confluence of the rivers and their surrounding lands, reaching the Pyrenees on clear days. The building is an authentic Castle-Palace, one of the best that Gothic art bequeathed to the Crown of Aragon, dated to the fourteenth and fifteenth centuries.

Part of the ancient population of Mequinenza can be visited today because it has become a large outdoor memory park after its demolition and flooding by the Ebro swamps. The original paths of the streets have been recovered from the runes and of the houses that were above the water level. The old Mequinenza, the "Old Town" as the mequinenzanos know it, is an invitation to walk through the memory of its streets and alleys, to rediscover part of the old Church, to imagine the old docks and to know a thousand stories, curiosities and legends of that millenary and historic town of navigators and miners on the banks of the Ebro river.
