= Godia =

Godia is a surname. Notable people with the surname include:

- Jane Godia (fl. early 21st century), Kenyan journalist
- Magda Godia (1953–2021), Spanish politician
- Paco Godia (1921–1990), Spanish racing driver
