= Almoravid northern expeditions (1112–1114) =

Raids in the Upper March, 1112–1114

- Part of the Reconquista
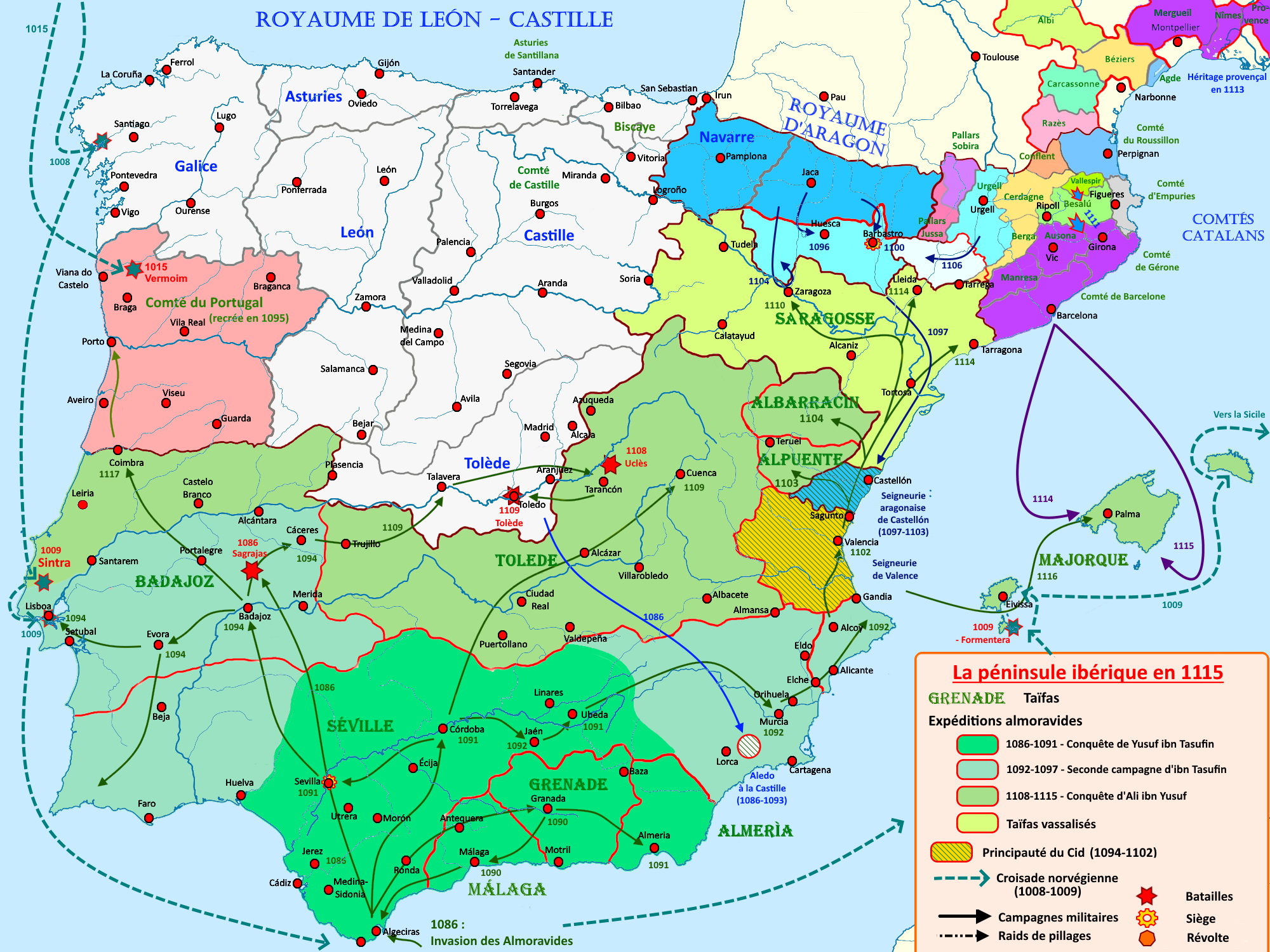
- Map of the Iberian Peninsula in 1115
Date	1112–1114
Location	Upper March
Result	Almoravid victory

Belligerents
Almoravid Empire	Kingdom of Aragon; Catalan counties

Commanders and leaders
Muhammad ibn al-Hajj	Íñigo Sanz de Laves (POW)

Strength
Unknown	Unknown

Casualties and losses
Unknown	Heavy

The Almoravid northern expeditions was a series of raids led by Muhammad ibn al-Hajj, the governor of Zaragoza against the Kingdom of Aragon and Catalonia.

== Background ==
In 1110, the Almoravids took control of the Taifa of Zaragoza and its capital Zaragoza. Zaragoza was the most important city in Sharq al-Andalus, as the Almoravids made it the capital of the Upper March (Arabic: الثغر الاعلى). Zaragoza was also a base for the Almoravids to launch campaigns against the Kingdom of Aragon and the Catalan Counties.

== Expeditions ==
In 1112, Ibn al-Hajj left from Zaragoza with his forces heading to the lands of Aragon, where he destroyed the Huesca region and the surrounding cities. The Almoravid forces reached the town of Ayera northeast of Huesca, where they captured and sacked it. Its governor, Íñigo Sanz de Laves, was among the prisoners. The invading forces continued their attacks north, raiding the Cinca River and the foothills of the Pyrenees

Between 1113 and 1114, the Almoravids, led by Ibn al-Hajj, carried out heavy raids on the regions of Huesca and Barbastro. During this campaign, the Almoravids recaptured the towns of Chalamera, Ontiñena, Pomar de Cinca, Sariñena and Velilla de Cinca. The attacks reached Catalonia and the foothills of the Pyrenees. There was no Aragonese or Christian resistance, as Ibn al-Hajj immediately returned to Zaragoza.

== Aftermath ==
The absence of Alfonso I had a profound impact on the southern borders of his kingdom, which he was then tasked with defending. In late 1114, the governors of Zaragoza and Valencia, Muhammad ibn al-Hajj and Muhammad ibn Aisha, launched a campaign against Catalonia. While returning to Zaragoza, they were ambushed at Martorell by Catalan troops, resulting in the deaths of Muhammad ibn al-Hajj.

In 1118, after six years in captivity, Íñigo Sanz de Laves finally paid a ransom of 500 mithqals for himself, his wife, his son and his daughter.

== Citations ==
- Cobb, Paul M. (2014). The Race for Paradise: An Islamic History of the Crusades. Oxford University Press. ISBN 978-0-19-935811-3.
- Dorronzoro Ramírez, Pablo (2017). "The Aragonese Episcopate and the Military Campaigns of Alfonso I the Battler against Iberian Muslims". In Radosław Kotecki; Jacek Maciejewski; John Ott (eds.). Between Sword and Prayer: Warfare and Medieval Clergy in Cultural Perspective. Brill. pp. 233–273. ISBN 978-90-04-35362-6.
- Español Solana, Darío (2024). Yihad y Reconquista: Guerra en Aragón, Navarra y Cataluña, siglos XI-XII (in Spanish). Desperta Ferro Ediciones. ISBN 978-84-128068-4-7.
- Kennedy, Hugh (2014). Muslim Spain and Portugal: A Political History of al-Andalus. Routledge. ISBN 978-1-317-87040-1.
- Lacarra de Miguel, José María (1972). Historia política del reino de Navarra: desde sus orígenes hasta su incorporación a Castilla (in Spanish). Aranzadi. ISBN 978-84-500-5700-3.
- Lafuente, José Luis Corral (1998). "La reconquista del Valle del Ebro". Militaria. 12: 49–66.
- Messier, Ronald A. (2010). The Almoravids and the Meanings of Jihad. Praeger/ABC-CLIO. ISBN 978-0-313-38590-2.
- Rábade Obradó, María del Pilar; Ramírez Vaquero, Eloísa; Utrilla Utrilla, Juan F. (2005). La dinámica política. Historia de España Medieval. Tres Cantos (Madrid): Ed. Istmo. ISBN 978-84-7090-433-2.
- Thackeray, Frank W.; Findling, John E. (2012). Events That Formed the Modern World: From the European Renaissance through the War on Terror [5 volumes]. Bloomsbury Publishing USA. ISBN 978-1-59884-902-8.
- Ubieto Arteta, Antonio (1981). Historia de Aragón: La formación territorial (in Spanish). Anubar.
