= Magda Godia =

Spanish politician (1953–2021)

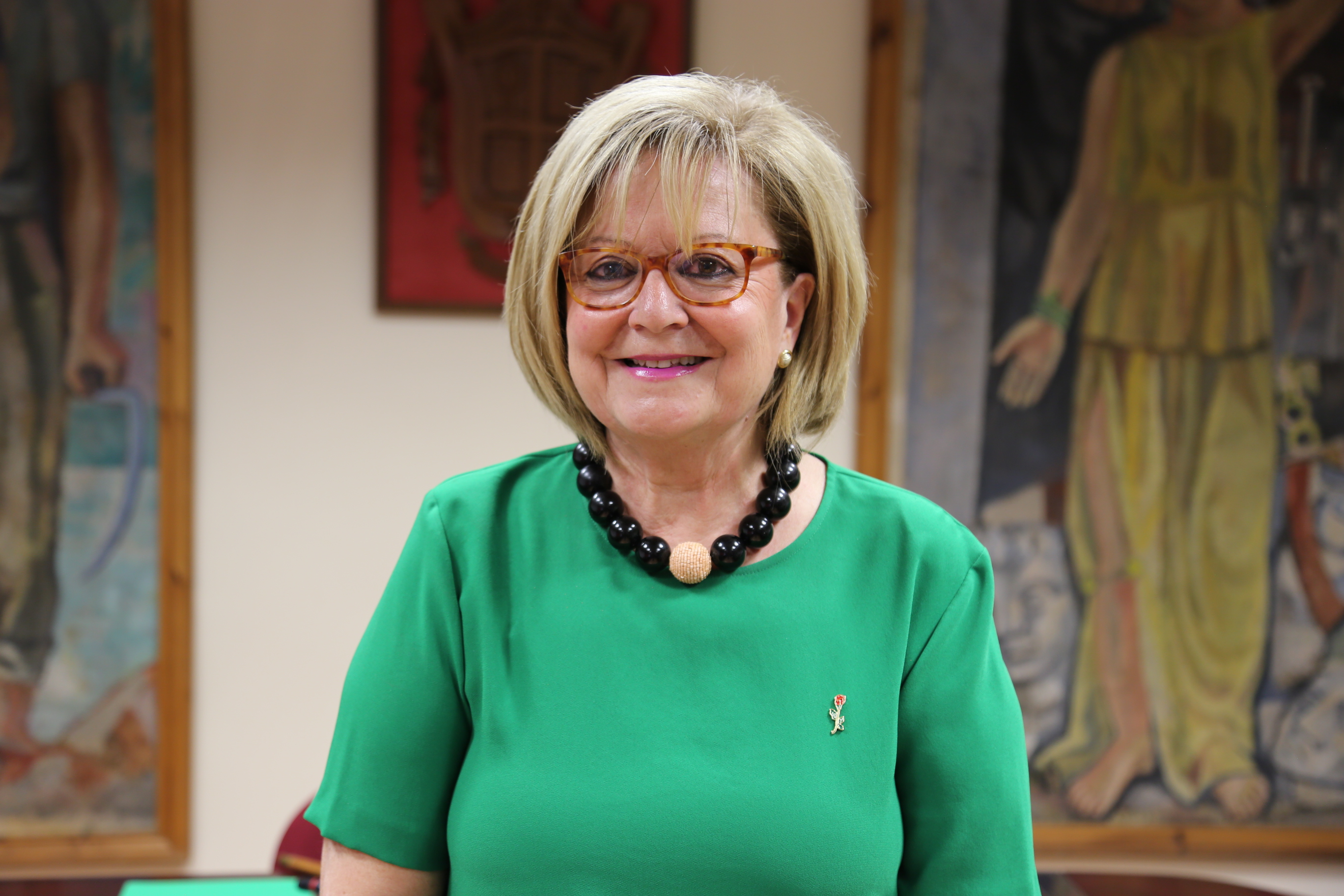
- Magda Godia

Mayor of Mequinenza
- In office 2003–2021
- Preceded by: Jaime Borbón Oliver
- Succeeded by: Antonio Sanjuan

Personal details
- Born: 5 July 1953 Mequinenza, Spain
- Died: 7 August 2021 (aged 68) Lleida, Spain
- Party: PSOE

Magdalena Godia Ibarz (5 July 1953 – 7 August 2021) was a Spanish politician. A member of the Spanish Socialist Workers' Party, she served as mayor of Mequinenza from 2003 until her death in 2021. She was a promoter of the Catalan language and helped establish the Espacio Moncada, dedicated to the works of Jesús Moncada.

== Biography ==
A teacher by profession, Godia worked at the Colegio Santa Agatoclia de Mequinenza from 1978 to 1992. She was elected to the Mequinenza City Council in 1991, promoting cultural projects in the city until 2003, when she was elected mayor.

From 2007 to 2014, Godia was President of the Regional Council of Bajo Cinca/Baix Cinca and served in the Ministry of Culture of the Diputación General de Aragón. She served in the Cortes of Aragon from 2013 to 2015. She was also a provincial executive of the Socialists' Party of Aragon, holding positions in equality and training.

Magda Godia died in Lleida on 7 August 2021 at the age of 68. She was replaced by Deputy Mayor Antonio Sanjuan during her final months of illness.
