= Faberllull =

Group

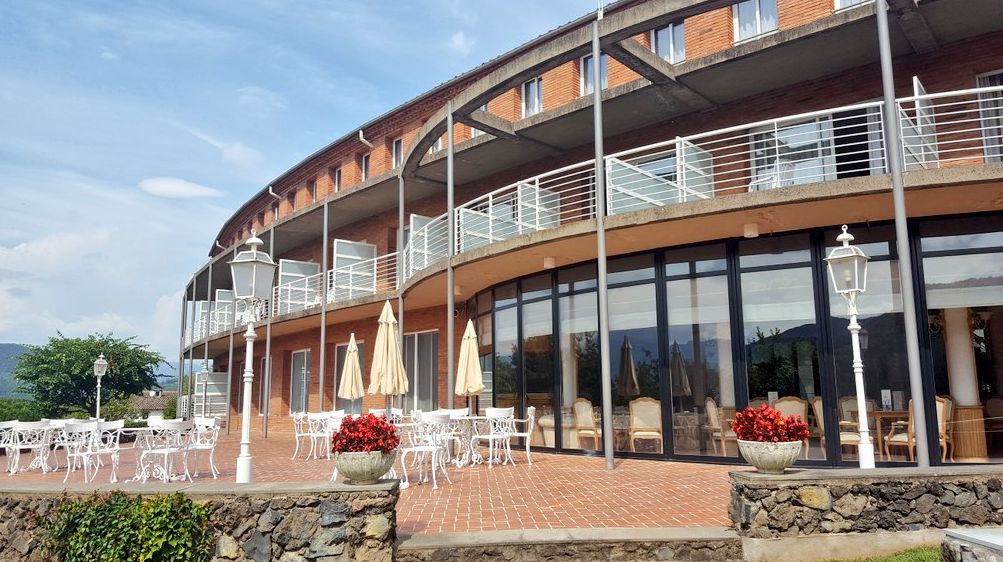
Faberllull Olot

Faberllull (from Latin faber, 'craftsman', 'worker', 'smith'...) is an arts, sciences and humanities group of residencies located in the city of Olot (Catalonia), Andorra and Palma. inaugurated in 2016 and directed by Francesc Serés from 2016 to 2021.

The idea of the project came from the culture councilor of Olot, Josep Berga, in 2012, who wanted to establish a creative residence that went beyond a local stage, that could be thought of in a national key. Berga contacted who would later become the center's director, Francesc Serés, a writer who had already visited other writers' residences, such as the Ledig House, in the United States, or in Bordeaux, to think about the project. The initial idea was to encourage feedback between foreigner and Catalan professionals, covering artistic, literary, journalistic, scientific or even religious topics. The project was born supported by the Olot City Council and the Department of Culture of the Catalan Government. In 2018 the residency was absorbed by Institut Ramon Llull, public body for international promotion of catalan language and culture. Short afterwards, Faberllull Andorra was inaugurated. And in 2021, an edition of Faberllull Palma opened its doors.
