= Cinca Medio =

Coordinates: 41°54′N 0°11′E

Cinca Medio Cinca Meya
- Comarca
- Country: Spain
- Autonomous community: Aragon
- Province: Huesca
- Capital: Monzón

Area
  - Total: 576.7 km^{2} (222.7 sq mi)

Population (2006)
  - Total: 23,072
  - Density: 40.01/km^{2} (103.6/sq mi)
- Time zone: UTC+1 (CET)
  - Summer (DST): UTC+2 (CEST)
- Largest municipality: Monzón

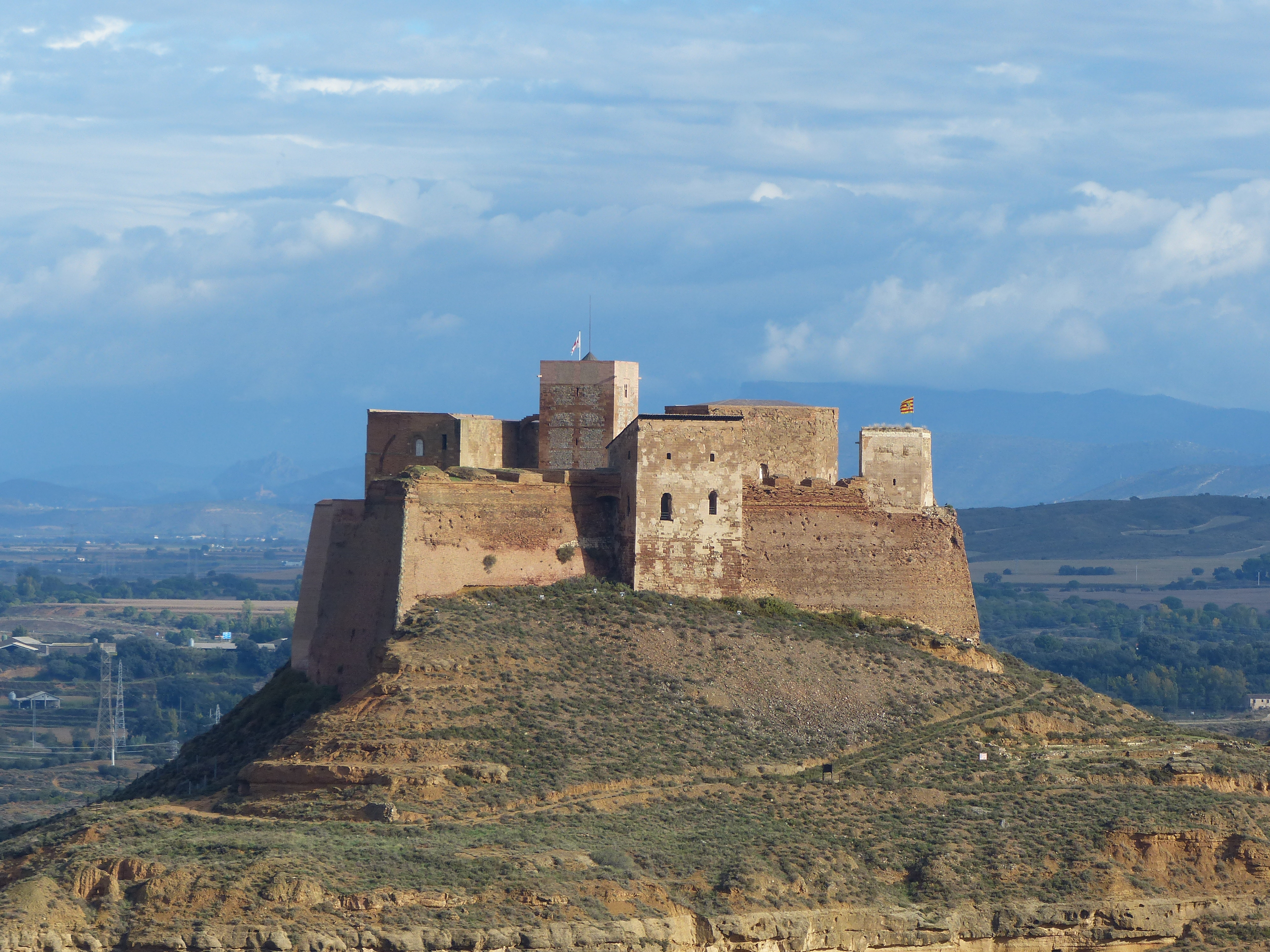
View of the castle in Monzón.

The Cinca Medio is a comarca in eastern Aragon, Spain. It is named after river Cinca.

This comarca is bordered on the northwest by the Somontano de Barbastro comarca, to the east by La Litera, and to the south by the Bajo Cinca and Monegros.

It is one of the regions with the greatest population density (40 inhabitants per km) in Aragon. The main sources of income are industry and agriculture.

== Municipalities ==
- Albalate de Cinca
- Alcolea de Cinca
- Alfántega
- Almunia de San Juan
- Binaced
- Fonz
- Monzón
- Pueyo de Santa Cruz
- San Miguel del Cinca

== See also ==
- Bajo Cinca
