= Zaidín =

Coordinates: 41°36′16″N 0°15′54″E

Zaidín/Saidí
- Coat of arms
- Interactive map of Zaidín/Saidí
- Country: Spain
- Autonomous community: Aragon
- Province: Huesca
- Municipality: Zaidín/Saidí

Area
  - Total: 93 km^{2} (36 sq mi)

Population (2025-01-01)
  - Total: 1,807
  - Density: 19/km^{2} (50/sq mi)
- Time zone: UTC+1 (CET)
  - Summer (DST): UTC+2 (CEST)

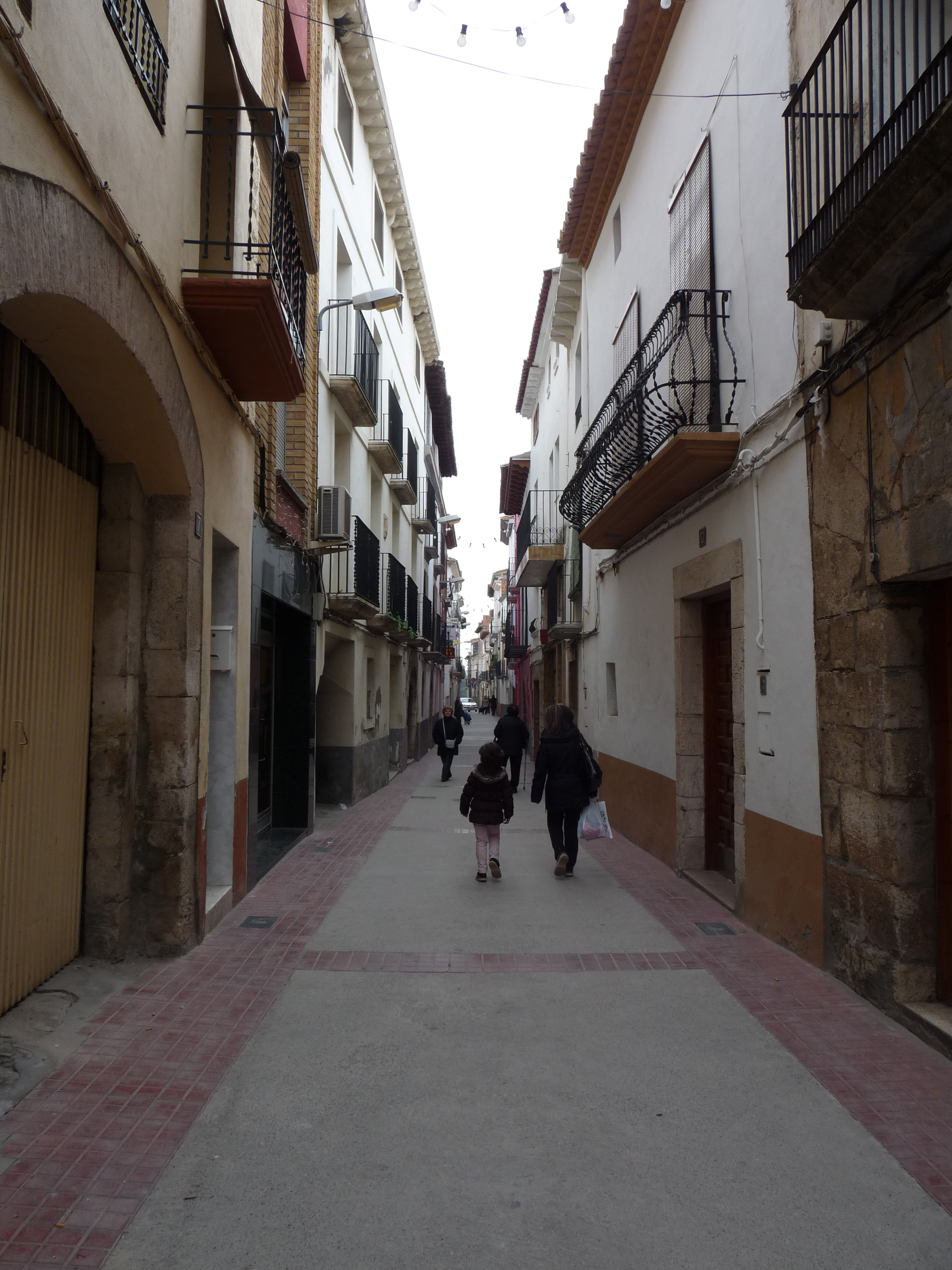
Street of Zaidín

Zaidín (Spanish pronunciation: [θajˈðin]) or Saidí (Catalan: [sajˈði]) is a municipality located in the province of Huesca, Aragon, Spain. According to the 2004 census (INE), the municipality has a population of 1,721 inhabitants.

== See also ==
- Bajo Cinca/Baix Cinca
- Francesc Serés
- List of municipalities in Huesca
