= Albalate de Cinca =

Albalate de Cinca Albalat de Cinca
- municipality
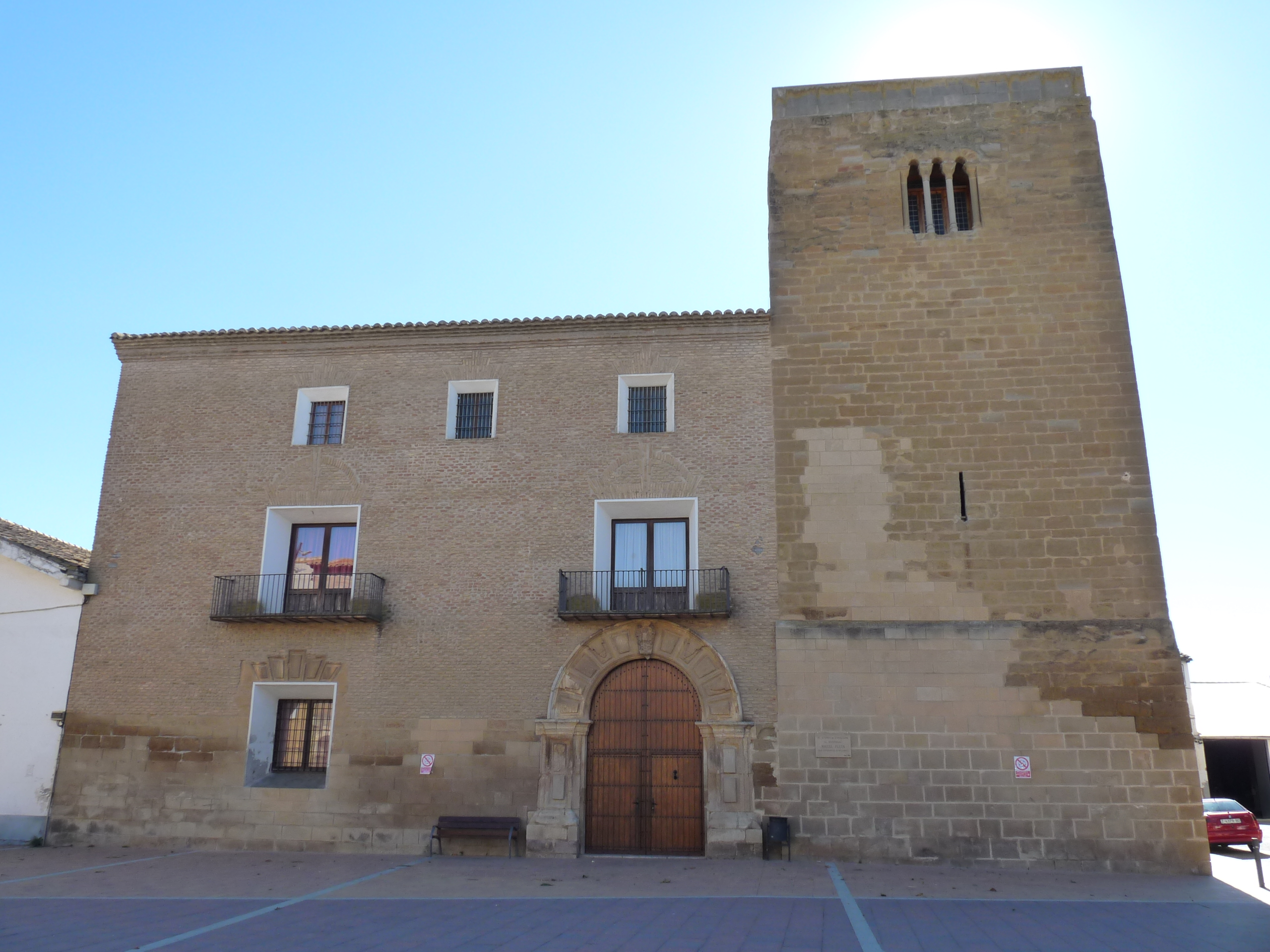
- Palace of the Duque of Solferino (17th c.)

- Flag Coat of arms

- Location of Albalate de Cinca within Aragon Location of Albalate de Cinca within Spain
- Coordinates: 41°43′25″N 0°08′47″E
- Country: Spain
- Autonomous community: Aragon
- Province: Huesca
- Comarca: Cinca Medio

Area
  - Total: 44 km^{2} (17 sq mi)

Population (2025-01-01)
  - Total: 1,080
  - Density: 25/km^{2} (64/sq mi)
- Time zone: UTC+1 (CET)
  - Summer (DST): UTC+2 (CEST)

Albalate de Cinca (Aragonese Albalat de Cinca) is a municipality located in the province of Huesca, Aragon, Spain. According to the 2004 census (INE), the municipality has a population of 1,222 inhabitants.

== See also ==
- List of municipalities in Huesca
