= Belver de Cinca =

- Municipality
- Location in Spain
- Coordinates: 41°41′00″N 0°12′50″W
- Country: Spain
- Autonomous community: Aragon
- Province: Huesca
- Comarca: Bajo Cinca/Baix Cinca
- Judicial district: Fraga

Area
  - Total: 82.6 km^{2} (31.9 sq mi)
- Elevation: 196 m (643 ft)

Population (2025-01-01)
  - Total: 1,298
  - Density: 15.7/km^{2} (40.7/sq mi)
- Demonym(s): Belllverí, bellverina
- Time zone: UTC+1 (CET)
  - Summer (DST): UTC+2 (CEST)
- Postal code: 22533
- Official language(s): Spanish, Catalan

Belver de Cinca (Spanish: [belˈβeɾ ðe ˈθiŋka]) is a municipality located in the province of Huesca, Aragon, Spain. According to the 2004 census (INE), the municipality has a population of 1,375 inhabitants.

== Notable people ==
- Felipe Alaiz (1887–1959), writer and translator
- Francisco Antonio Cosme Bueno (1711-1798), physician and scientist who spent most of his life in the Viceroyalty of Peru

== See also ==
- Bajo Cinca/Baix Cinca
- List of municipalities in Huesca
