= Felipe Aláiz =

Aragonese writer and journalist (1887–1959)

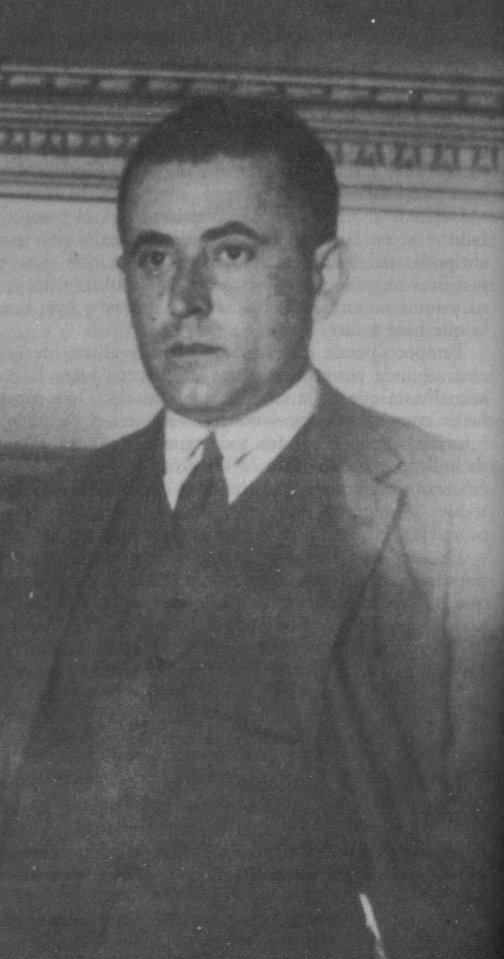
- Born: Felipe Aláiz de Pablo; 23 May 1887; Belver de Cinca, Aragon, Spain
- Died: 8 April 1959 (aged 71); Paris, France
- Writing career
- Notable work: Hacia una federación de autonomías ibéricas
- Literary movement: Anarchism, Iberism

Felipe Aláiz de Pablo (23 May 1887 – 8 April 1959) was an Aragonese anarchist writer, translator and journalist. He began writing for the anarchist press during the 1910s and went on to edit some of the movement's principle publications during the 1930s. His main work, Hacia una federación de autonomías ibéricas, advocates for Iberism, municipalism and collectivism, and criticises Spanish nationalism and statism.

== Biography ==
Felipe Aláiz was born into a middle-class Aragonese family, in the small town of Belver de Cinca, on 23 May 1887. He came under the influence of the Aragonese economist Joaquín Costa, and from 1914 to 1915, he read the Republican newspaper Talión, which was published in Uesca by Ramón J. Sender. In 1915, he began writing for Ideal de Zaragoza, through which he closely collaborated with the Aragonese anarchist Ramón Acín. At this time, he turned towards anarchism himself, influenced by the municipalist and federalist works of Ricardo Mella, Joan Montseny and Peter Kropotkin.

He began writing for the anarchist press in 1917, with contributions to the Madrid-based periodical El Sol. From 1920 to 1921, he edited the anarchist periodical Los Galeotes. He also translated works by anarchist writers such as Camillo Berneri, Max Nettlau and Upton Sinclair, and wrote a number of short novels. Aláiz joined the National Confederation of Labour (CNT) and the Iberian Anarchist Federation (FAI), and wrote frequently for the CNT newspaper Solidaridad Obrera. Spanish historian Manuel Buenacasa described Aláiz as one of the best writers in the CNT-FAI. Following the proclamation of the Second Spanish Republic, in 1931, Alaiz took over as editor-in-chief of Solidaridad Obrera, before going on to edit the FAI newspaper Tierra y Libertad. From 1935 to 1936, he edited the magazine Ética, and after the outbreak of the Spanish Civil War, he edited the newspaper Superación. Following the Nationalist victory in the Spanish Civil War, he fled into exile. There he edited CNT, the main organ of the CNT in exile.

Over the course of his life, Aláiz authored 15 volumes. Between 1945 and 1947, he wrote Hacia una federación de autonomías ibéricas, a treatise on Iberism. Initially published as a series of booklets, then later as a full 20-chapter volume, the work includes Aláiz's commentary on the history of local government in Spain, the Spanish economy and the nationalities and regions of Spain. He attacked the idea of a Spanish nation, declaring it to have been an illegitimate social construct created by the Spanish state in order to justify its monopoly on violence. He also rejected the "myth" of a single Spanish race, declaring it to be a "congolomerate with infinite varieties". Aláiz centred the Iberian Peninsula as a negation of unitary ideas on race, language and nationality. He envisioned an Iberian federation based on a union of free municipalities, although his work largely neglected to include Portugal in its analysis. In his historical analysis, Aláiz considered the state to be an invading force that had usurped and homogenised the multicultural medieval communes and autonomous regions of Iberia. He reconceived the Spanish Revolution of 1936 as a reassertion of municipal autonomy with the abolition of the state. Aláiz saw the revolutionary establishment of collective ownership in self-governing municipalities as a model for the whole peninsula.

Aláiz died in Paris, on 8 April 1959. His work has largely been neglected in histories of both the Spanish Republic and the anarchist movement.

== Selected works ==
Fiction

- Elisabeth (1923)
- Quinet, Un club de mujeres fatales (1924)
- La Universidad Popular (1938)

Non-fiction

- Por una economía solidaria entre el campo y la ciudad (1937)
- Para que la propaganda sea eficaz (1938)
- Hacia una federación de autonomías ibéricas (1993) [1945–1947]

== Bibliography ==
- Cleminson, Richard (June 2012). "Felipe Alaiz, Iberian Federalism and the Making of the Anarchist Intellectual". Social and Education History. 1 (2): 153–171. doi:10.4471/hse.2012.10. ISSN 2014-3567.
