= Alcolea de Cinca =

Coordinates: 41°43′N 0°07′E

Alcolea de Cinca Alcoleya de Cinca
- municipality
- Flag Coat of arms
- Interactive map of Alcolea de Cinca
- Country: Spain
- Autonomous community: Aragon
- Province: Huesca
- Comarca: Cinca Medio

Area
  - Total: 82 km^{2} (32 sq mi)

Population (2025-01-01)
  - Total: 1,127
  - Density: 14/km^{2} (36/sq mi)
- Time zone: UTC+1 (CET)
  - Summer (DST): UTC+2 (CEST)

Alcolea de Cinca (Aragonese Alcoleya de Cinca) is a municipality located in the province of Huesca, Aragon, Spain. According to the 2004 census (INE), the municipality has a population of 1,245 inhabitants.

== See also ==
- List of municipalities in Huesca
