= Pueyo de Santa Cruz =

- Municipality
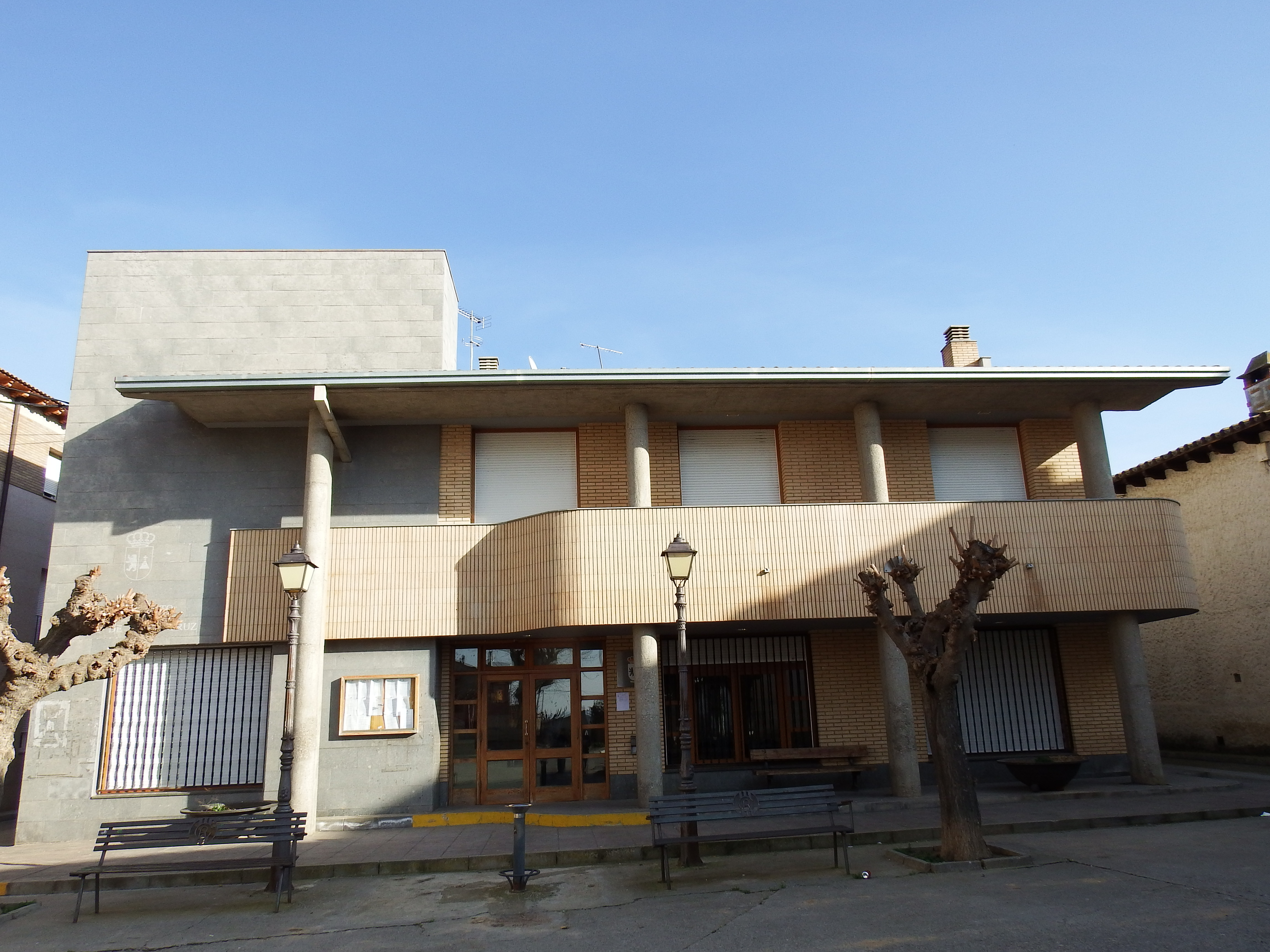
- Town hall

- Coat of arms

- Location of El Pueyo de Santa Cruzwithin Aragon Location of El Pueyo de Santa Cruz within Spain
- Coordinates: 41°51′N 0°10′E
- Country: Spain
- Autonomous community: Aragon
- Province: Huesca
- Comarca: Cinca Medio

Area
  - Total: 9 km^{2} (3.5 sq mi)

Population (2025-01-01)
  - Total: 332
  - Density: 37/km^{2} (96/sq mi)
- Time zone: UTC+1 (CET)
  - Summer (DST): UTC+2 (CEST)

Pueyo de Santa Cruz is a municipality located in the province of Huesca, Aragon, Spain. According to the 2004 census (INE), the municipality has a population of 330 inhabitants.

== See also ==
- List of municipalities in Huesca
