= Osso de Cinca =

Coordinates: 41°39′54″N 0°11′27″E

- municipality
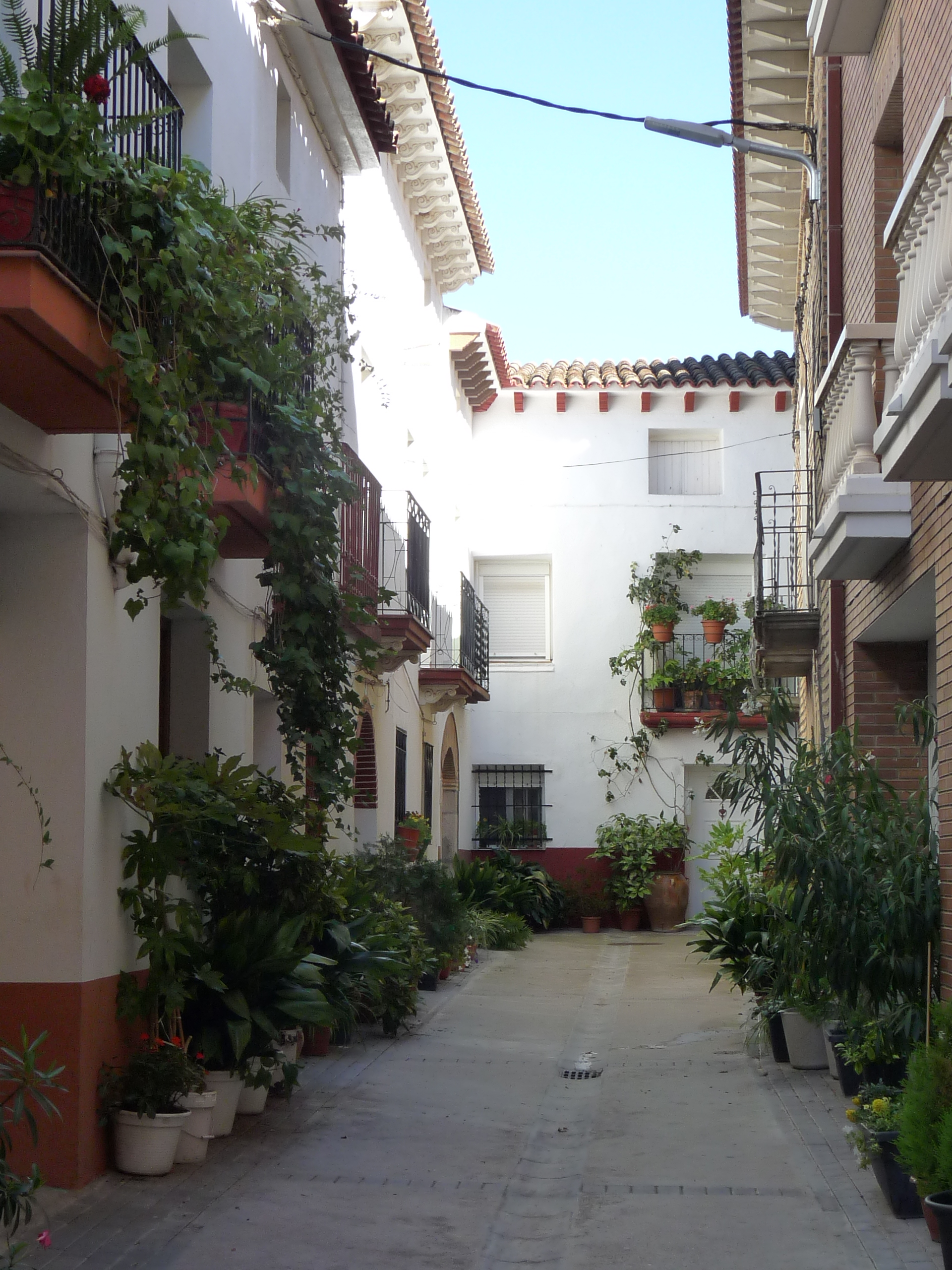

- Flag Coat of arms
- Interactive map of Osso de Cinca
- Country: Spain
- Autonomous community: Aragon
- Province: Huesca

Area
  - Total: 27 km^{2} (10 sq mi)

Population (2025-01-01)
  - Total: 644
  - Density: 24/km^{2} (62/sq mi)
- Time zone: UTC+1 (CET)
  - Summer (DST): UTC+2 (CEST)

Osso de Cinca (Spanish: [ˈoso ðe ˈθiŋka]) is a municipality located in the province of Huesca, Aragon, Spain. According to the 2004 census (INE), the municipality has a population of 746 inhabitants.

== See also ==
- List of municipalities in Huesca
