= Candasnos =

Coordinates: 41°30′N 0°04′E

- municipality
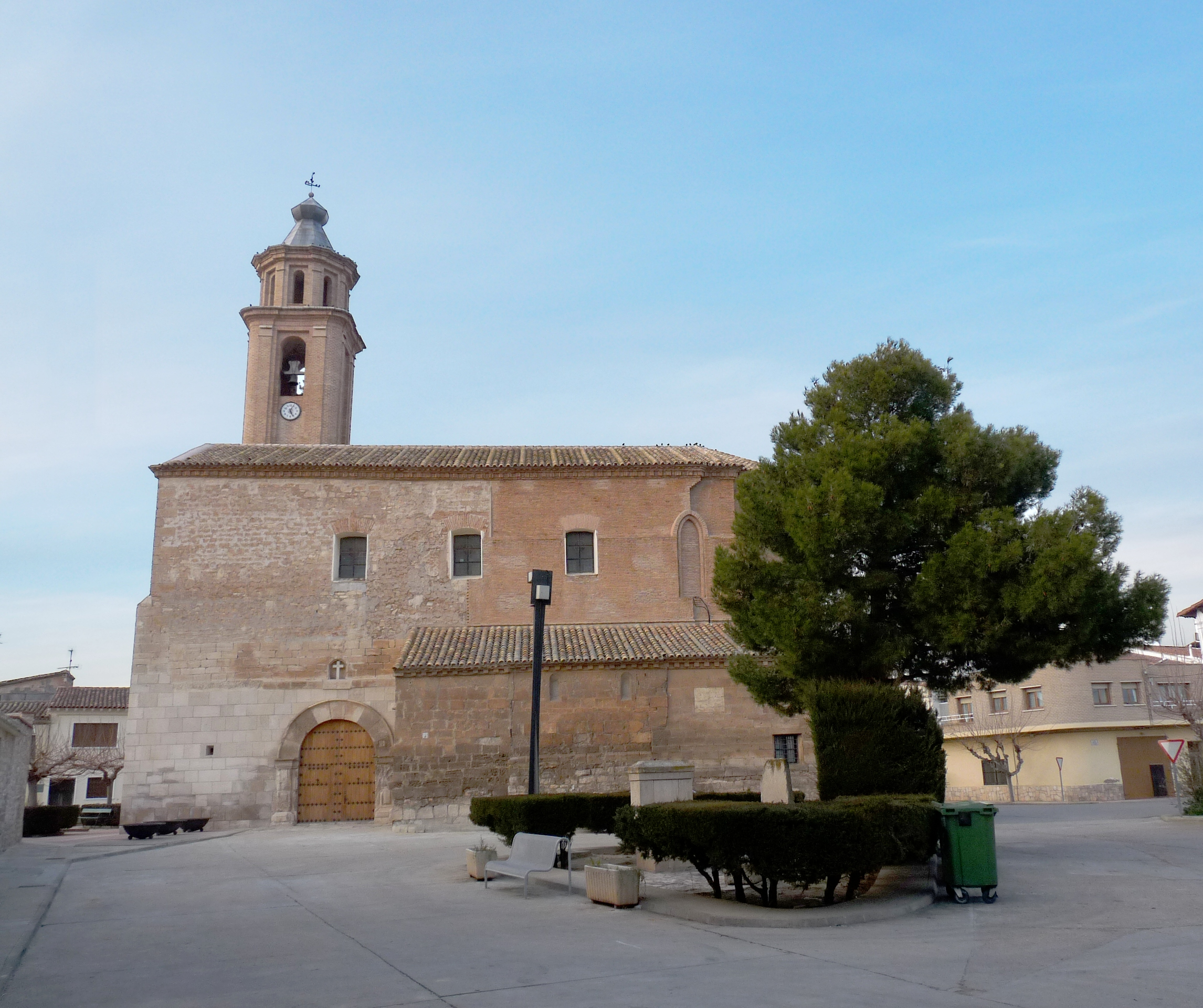

- Flag Coat of arms

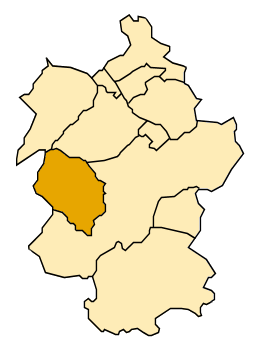
- Localisation of Candasnos
- Country: Spain
- Autonomous community: Aragon
- Province: Huesca

Area
  - Total: 122 km^{2} (47 sq mi)

Population (2025-01-01)
  - Total: 478
  - Density: 3.92/km^{2} (10.1/sq mi)
- Time zone: UTC+1 (CET)
  - Summer (DST): UTC+2 (CEST)

Candasnos (Spanish pronunciation: [kanˈdasnos]) is a municipality located in the province of Huesca, Aragon, Spain. According to the 2024 census (INE), the municipality has a population of 422 inhabitants.

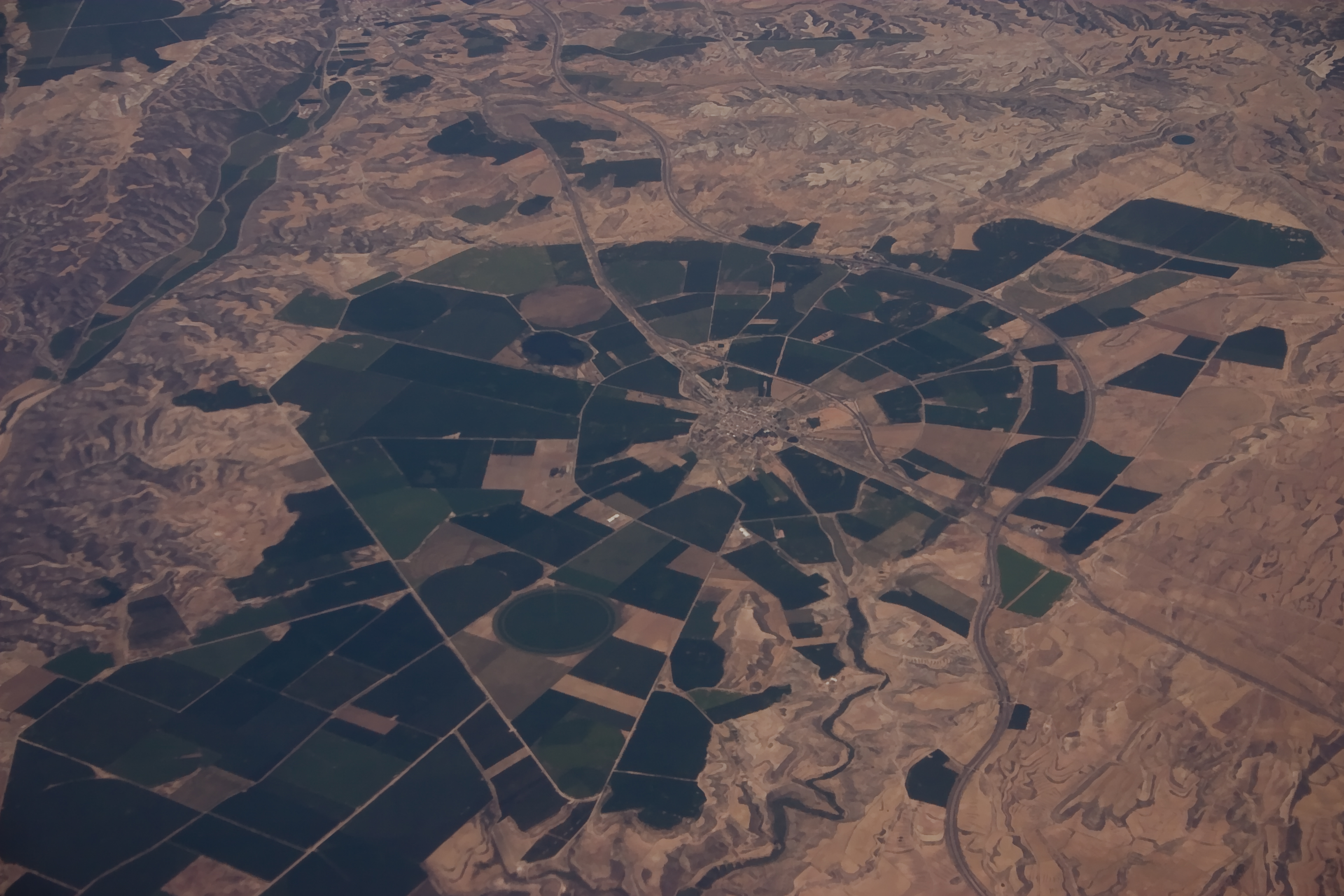
Aerial photograph of Candasnos

== See also ==
- List of municipalities in Huesca
