= Francisco Antonio Cosme Bueno =

Spanish-Peruvian physician and scientist

Francisco Antonio Cosme Bueno y Alegre
- Born: April 9, 1711; Belver de Cinca, Aragón, Spain
- Died: March 11, 1798 (aged 86); Lima, Peru
- Other names: Cosme Bueno
- Occupations: Physician and scientist
- Title: Cosmógrafo Mayor del Virreinato del Perú

Francisco Antonio Cosme Bueno y Alegre (also known as Cosme Bueno; born April 9, 1711 in Belver de Cinca, Aragón, Spain; died March 11, 1798 in Lima, Peru) was a prominent Spanish-Peruvian physician and scientist in the Viceroyalty of Peru.

He began his career as a pharmacist. His work as a physician was influenced by the work of Hermann Boerhaave and Anton de Haen. He received his medical degree in 1750.

In 1744 he married donia Maria Gonz6alez de Mendoza. They had nine children.

== Works ==
- Disertación physico experimental sobre la naturaleza del agua, y sus propiedades. --Lima : [s.n.], [1750?].
- Colección geográfica e histórica de los arzobispados y obispados del Reyno del Perú, con las descripciones de las provincias de su jurisdicción. -- [Lima : s.n., 1759-1776].
- Catálogo histórico de los virreyes, governadores, presidentes, y capitanes generales del Perú, con los sucesos más principales de sus tiempos. -- [Lima] : [s.n.], [1763?].
- Tablas de las declinaciones del sol, calculadas al meridiano de Lima, que puedan servir sin error sensible desde el año de 1764, hasta el de 1775, inclusive. -- Lima : [s.n.], 1763.
- Inoculación de las viruelas. -- [Lima : s.n., 1778].
- Geografía del Perú virreinal. -- Lima : [D. Miranda], 1951.
