= Francesc Serés =

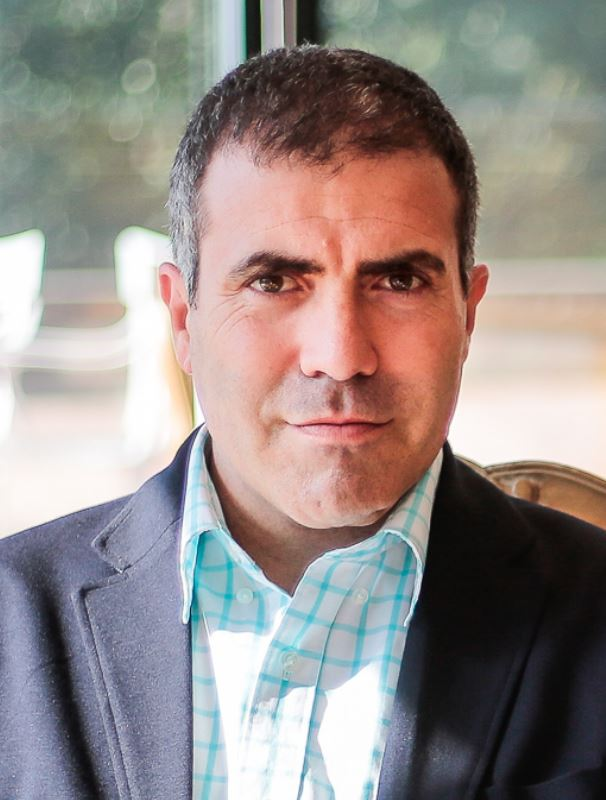
- Born: Francesc Serés Guillén; 22 December 1972 (age 52) Zaidín, Spain
- Occupation: Writer
- Education: Philosophy and anthropology
- Alma mater: University of Barcelona
- Period: 21st century

Francesc Serés Guillén (born Zaidín, Spain, 22 December 1972) is a Catalan-language writer.

He obtained a Fine Arts degree (1996) and another in Anthropology (1998) from the University of Barcelona and, in 2001, the title of Research Aptitude from the Pompeu Fabra University of Barcelona.

With his first novel Els ventres de la terra (The Bellies of the Earth, 2000), he was a finalist for the Pere Calders Prize, after which he published two more novels, L'arbre sense tronc (The Tree without a Trunk, 2001) and Una llengua de plom (A Tongue of Lead, 2002). A third book, De fems i de marbres (On Manures and Marbles, 2003) concluded this trilogy.

He has also written a short-story collection titled La força de la gravetat (Force of Gravity, 2006 – winner of the "Serra d'Or" Critics' Prize for Fiction and the National Literature Prize); the set of reports La matèria primera (Raw Material – winner of Octavi Pellissa Prize, which was published in 2007); and Contes russos (Russian Stories, 2009 – winner of the Critics' Prize and the City of Barcelona Prize for Fiction) and translated to English by Peter Bush. In the sphere of theatre he has written the play Caure amunt. Muntaner, Roig, Llull (Falling Up: Muntaner, Llull and Roig, 2008).

His last book La pell de la frontera (Traversing the Border) was published in 2014.

He has collaborated with El País Spanish newspaper and with Ara.

== Published works ==
- 2000 — Els ventres de la terra. Columna, Barcelona.
- 2001 — L'arbre sense tronc. Columna, Barcelona.
- 2002 — Una llengua de plom. Quaderns Crema, Barcelona.
- 2003 — De fems i de marbres. Quaderns Crema, Barcelona.
- 2006 — La força de la gravetat. Quaderns Crema, Barcelona.
- 2007 — La matèria primera. Empúries, Barcelona.
- 2008 — Caure amunt. Muntaner, Llull, Roig. Quaderns Crema, Barcelona.
- 2009 — DD.AA., Matar en Barcelona (antologia de relats), Alpha Decay, Barcelona.
- 2009 — Contes russos. Quaderns Crema, Barcelona.
- 2010 — El llarg viatge d'A. Cruïlla, Barcelona.
- 2012 — Mossegar la poma. Quaderns Crema, Barcelona.
- 2014 — La pell de la frontera. Quaderns Crema, Barcelona
- 2020 — La casa de foc. Proa, Barcelona.
- 2022 — La mentida més bonica. Proa, Barcelona.
