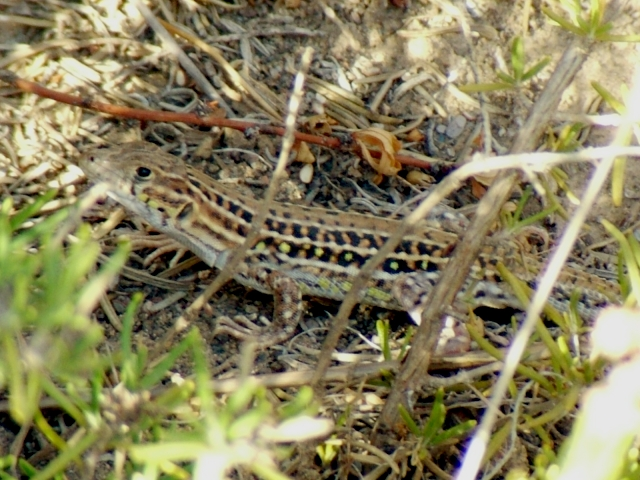

Conservation status
- Least Concern (IUCN 3.1)

Scientific classification
- Kingdom: Animalia
- Phylum: Chordata
- Class: Reptilia
- Order: Squamata
- Family: Lacertidae
- Genus: Acanthodactylus
- Species: A. erythrurus

Binomial name
- Acanthodactylus erythrurus (Schinz, 1833)
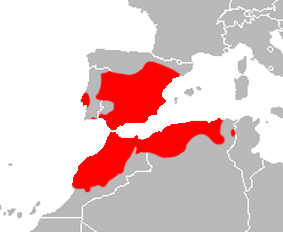

Synonyms
- Lacerta erythrura Schinz, 1833; Acanthodactylus vulgaris A.M.C. Duméril & Bibron, 1839; Acanthodactylus lineo-maculatus A.M.C. Duméril & Bibron, 1839; Acanthodactylus belli Gray, 1845; Acanthodactylus erythrurus — Mertens, 1929

= Acanthodactylus erythrurus =

Species of lizard

Acanthodactylus erythrurus, commonly known as the spiny-footed lizard, is a species of lizard in the family Lacertidae. The species is endemic to northwestern Africa and the Iberian Peninsula. It is considered to be the fastest member of the family Lacertidae. Its common name refers to the spines that are arranged like a comb on the toes of its hind legs.

== Description ==
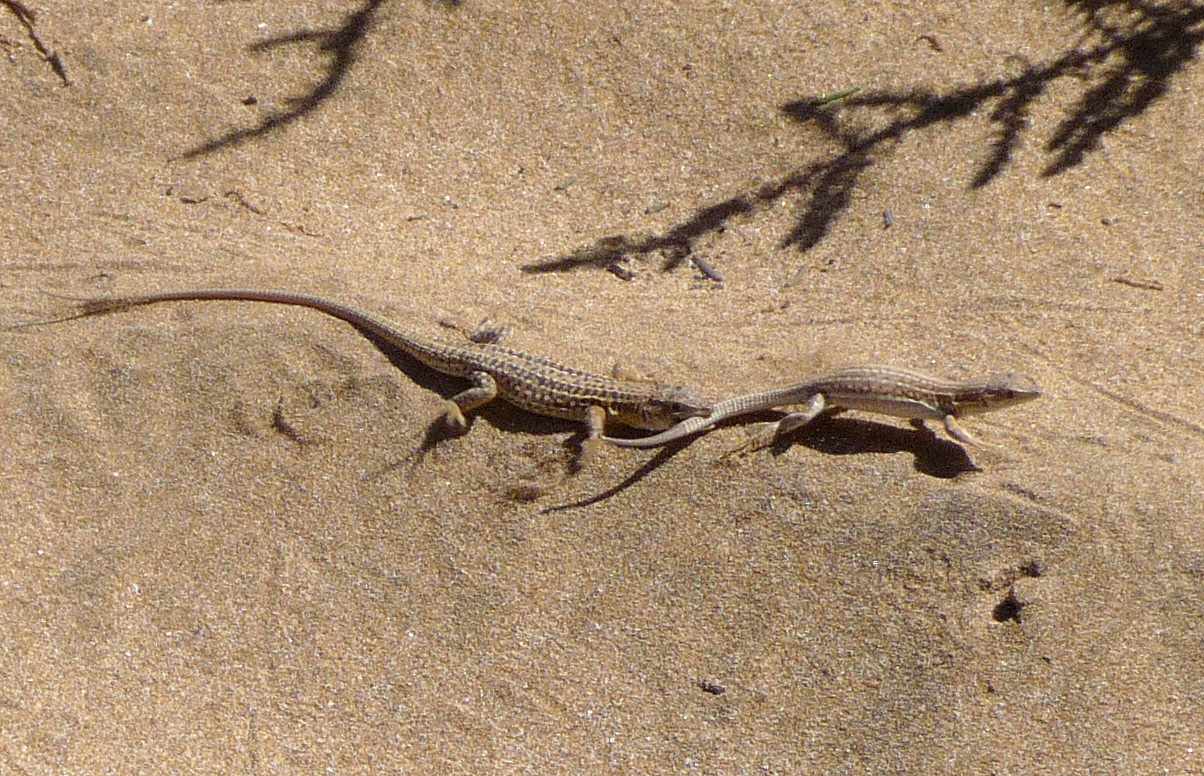
Fighting

The spiny-footed lizard is 20 cm long, so it can be categorized as a medium sized animal. It has a tail that is two thirds of the lizard's total size, and it has a very strong body. The snout is quite short and the supra occipital plates are defined enough to portray the illusion of the eyebrows being located on the lizard's head. The entire body is covered with thin, seed-like scales. The scales have a keeled structure and the midline protrudes outwards. The lizard has long nails on its strong hind legs and long white lines on a greyish-yellow skin tone. There are also irregular dark and yellow spots all over the legs. The anterior belly is a shade of white and the long tail is a brilliant red on the lateral portions. During the mating period, the males' yellow ocelli and the females' red tails become more intensely colored.

== Biology ==
The spiny-footed lizard lives in very particular areas. It requires loose and clear coastal soils and low scrub coverage. Generally, this species is more commonly present in the mountainous areas at a higher altitude, but it avoids agricultural landscapes. It is also more active during the warmer months and it is mostly awake during the daytime. However, in the coastal regions, the lizard is active throughout the year and not constrained to the warmer months. During the coldest days of the year, the lizard is generally inactive. In areas outside the coast, the lizard hibernates during autumn and winter in small self-dug tunnels. These tunnels allow the lizard to regulate their body temperatures because they are relatively shallow and face towards the south.

The diet includes a multitude of insects, snails, and plant matter like flower petals and stems. The insects it consumes include ants, bugs, and beetles. The spiny-footed lizard has a rutting period during the spring and it mates between May and June. Between June and August, the female lizard lays around 2 to 5 eggs. After the eggs are laid, they hatch 2 to 5 months after.

== Taxonomy ==
In Morocco, the spiny-footed lizards have been historically represented by Acanthodactylus lineomaculatus and Acanthodactylus erythrurus. Two subspecies were discovered in the Acanthodactylus erythrurus; atlanticus and belli.

In 1982, Salvador found that the subspecies atlanticus should have acted as an intermediate between the two subspecies in Morocco, belli and lineomaculatus. Additionally, there has not been any long periods of isolation in lineomaculatus when individuals with characteristics between lineomaculatus and atlanticus in the Marrakech region were examined.

Genetic analyses also show that there were no long periods of isolation in coastal areas between Tangier and Cape Rhir that supports lineomaculatus' sup specific classification. Furthermore, the morphological differences amongst atlanticus and belli are simply adaptations to various habitats. The lizards in Jebel Sirwa are genetically similar to A. blanci and the Algerian lizards compared to the lizards in the northern regions of the Moroccan High Atlas. Ultimately, scientists and researchers concluded that A. erythrurus, A. lineomaculatus and A. blanci should be included within a single species consisting of a wide genetic distribution.

=== Subspecies ===
Four subspecies, including the nominotypical subspecies, are recognized as being valid.

- Acanthodactylus erythrurus atlanticus Boulenger, 1918 – Morocco
- Acanthodactylus erythrurus belli Gray, 1845 – Algeria and Morocco
- Acanthodactylus erythrurus erythrurus (Schinz, 1833) – Iberian Peninsula
- Acanthodactylus erythrurus lineomaculatus A.M.C. Duméril & Bibron, 1839 – Morocco

== Geographic range ==
A. erythrurus is native to Europe in Gibraltar, Portugal, and Spain, and is native to Africa in Algeria, Morocco, and Tunisia. In Morocco, the lizard is widely distributed, but it is less frequent in the extremely arid areas and the Sahara.

== Habitat ==
Though the spiny-footed lizard prefers dry and sparsely vegetated regions, it is not restricted to arid terrain, and it is not uncommon to find it in other environments. The spiny-footed lizard is a terrestrial species that seeks refuge in cork oak barks, stones, and flat surfaces. It moves through palm hearts and thick bushes and burrows in sandy areas and roots of various bushes. Within these regions, it inhabits 'plains with scattered scrub, coastal dunes, stony sides or oak cork forests, and other regions.

== Description ==
The spiny-footed lizard's coloration and the pattern of its spots are extremely variable. As result, zoologists have from time to time classified such variations as separate species. The Acanthodactylus erythrurus is a medium-sized lizard that has a maximum size of 227 mm. Its second and third supraoculars are long and its first and fourth are fragmented. Between the supraocular and the supraciliar regions, there are one or two rows of granular scales. It has a large head and a rounded or pointed muzzle. It has a strong body, but in Atlantic coastal areas north of Cape Rhir, it has a slimmer build compared to the rest of the populations. In the lineomaculatus, the dorsal scales are very fine, but in the other parts of the lizard population, the dorsal scales are not very fine, particularly in the anterior region.

The body of the spiny-footed lizard is gray with tones of burnt umber and burnt sienna. Starkly white longitudinal lines longitudinally align on the base color. In between the white lines, there are black and white marks and dots. The lineomaculatus lizards located in the Atlantic coast north of Cape Rhir have green and blue ocelli. In comparison to the other lizards in the Acanthodactylus genus, these particular lizards have three series of scales on their fingers and brilliant red tails in the juvenile and subadult populations. Only the female lizards continue to present with the bright red tails, and the males do not have these tails.

=== Age-Related Differences in Lipophilic Compounds in Femoral Gland Secretions ===
Based on a mass spectra analysis of chemicals found in secretions of the femoral glands of male spiny-footed lizards, 45 lipophilic compounds were identified. However, adult and subadult males differed in the composition of these lipophilic secretions. In younger lizards, C9 and C15 carboxylic acids were more abundant, but in older lizards, C16 and C20 carboxylic acids were more abundant. Additionally, older lizards had significantly lower proportions of cholesterol and campesterol but higher amounts of dehydrocholesterol. The presence of these different compounds can be a sign of variation in how these chemicals are used to communicate. Because A. erythrurus are found in arid areas with higher temperatures, there should be a lot of carbon atoms in the carboxylic acids; however, the older lizards have a lot of carbons in their carboxylic acids. Older males should increase the amount of low volatile chemicals in their secretions.

== Behavior ==
The spiny-footed lizard, like other members of the genus Acanthodactylus, may defend itself aggressively and bite tenaciously, if one tries to catch it. Individuals are continuously involved in skirmishes with other members of the species and the males strenuously defend the borders of their territories. As mentioned above, these lizards are among the fastest lizards to exist. They move really low to the ground which is said to improve their agility. Additionally, if needed as a last resort to dodge a predator, the lizard can detach and regenerate its tail.

This lizard is active annually, but in locations with colder winters, the lizard becomes inactive and enters into a winter slumber from November to February. However, if warmer days occur during these months, the lizard will emerge and activate its functions. In order to avoid the colder months, the spiny-footed lizard can be found building shallow tunnels facing south to capture heat. Small insects, such as snails, and plants often fall into their tunnels, thus assisting them with nourishment during these cold months as well.

=== Aggression ===
In spiny-footed lizards, their red coloration has actually been hypothesized to reduce aggression through the aggression avoidance hypothesis. In the article "Red coloration in juvenile spiny-footed lizards, Acanthodactylus erythrurus, reduces adult aggression," Belen Fresnillo studied the lizards to test the impact of juvenile coloration of adult aggressiveness. In order to conduct the study, the lizards were recorded in captivity and encounters between male and female adults with the natural red coloration or red/white painted onto these natural areas were observed. In order to test the aggression, the researchers recorded how many times the juveniles were attacked or bitten. The juveniles that were unpainted had no significant relationship between coloration and aggression. Juveniles that were experimentally painted red were bitten less than their white painted counterparts. According to these results, the aggression avoidance hypothesis can be supported because the progression from attacking to biting was lower for red juvenile lizards. A distinct red color in the juveniles significantly reduced adult aggression; however, the smaller natural color variations did not have much of an effect on aggression.

== Reproduction ==
A. erythrurus is oviparous. The number of eggs in a clutch varies from three to seven. The average total length (including tail) of a sexually mature adult of the species is 18 to 20 cm (7.1 to 7.9 in). During May through June, the lizards engage in copulation. If the female lizard is larger, she might breed again in July. The lizards have 1 to 8 eggs and they hatch during July and August. Generally, the adult females display a bright red coloration in their hind legs and tail. This coloration has been a serious source of experimentation because the function seems to be quite significant. In a study done by Jose Cuervo in "Exploring the function of red colouration in female spiny-footed lizards (Acanthodactylus erythrurus): patterns of seasonal colour change," adult female lizards were captured and kept in captivity. There were three experimental groups: female and male where fertilization was possible, female and male where fertilization was not possible, and two females where fertilization was also not possible. Through spectrophotometric quantification, the red color was analyzed and it seemed that right after reproduction, the red color increased but during the breeding season, the red faded into white in all three experimental groups. Both the fertile and infertile females laid eggs, but only the fertilized females laid fertile eggs, whereas the unfertilized females laid infertile eggs. The females that actively interacted with males were darker towards the end of the breeding season compared to the females who were not actively interacting with the males. This indicates that fertilization and physical contact can impact the red coloration of adult females' hind legs and tails. The red color could have a mating-related function, but the white coloration could indicate gravidity, pregnancy, in the species.

Not only does the red coloration indicate fertilization, but it can also influence male mate choice decisions. Although males and females show the red coloration as juveniles and subadults, this coloration fades away in the males. Because the red color fades after ovulation, the red color in females is a clear sign of a mating-related function. In the study done by Josabel Belliure described in the article "Male mate choice based on female coloration in a lizard: the role of a juvenile trait," male courtship preferences were analyzed. The males were offered female pairs, adult/subadult, that had different sizes and different tail colorations, red or white. The males used their chemical and visual cues to make mate choices, and if they were able to choose a lizard based on red coloration, they preferred females with a red coloration. Additionally, regardless of color, they can use chemical cues to choose the adult in the pair. According to this particular study, the red color could indicate sexual maturity or a pre-ovulatory reproductive status. The concluding hypothesis stands that "males would benefit from an increased probability of fertilizing the females and siring their offspring. Females might also benefit from exhibiting the red coloration leading to male mate choice because it might favor mating with higher-quality males or reproducing earlier."

== Conservation ==
The Spiny Footed lizard appears to be a species under special protection, especially in considering its coastal populations. Its habitat is heavily affected by coastal urbanization as well as maritime promenades being constructed a lot more than in the past. Its habitat is also at risk of deteriorating due to global warming and climate change threats. These threats are especially worrisome for the Spiny Footed Lizard as it is a species that thrives on its environment and really relies on/ utilizes it to live.
