= Velilla de Cinca =

Coordinates: 41°35′N 0°16′E

Velilla de Cinca/Vilella de Cinca
- municipality
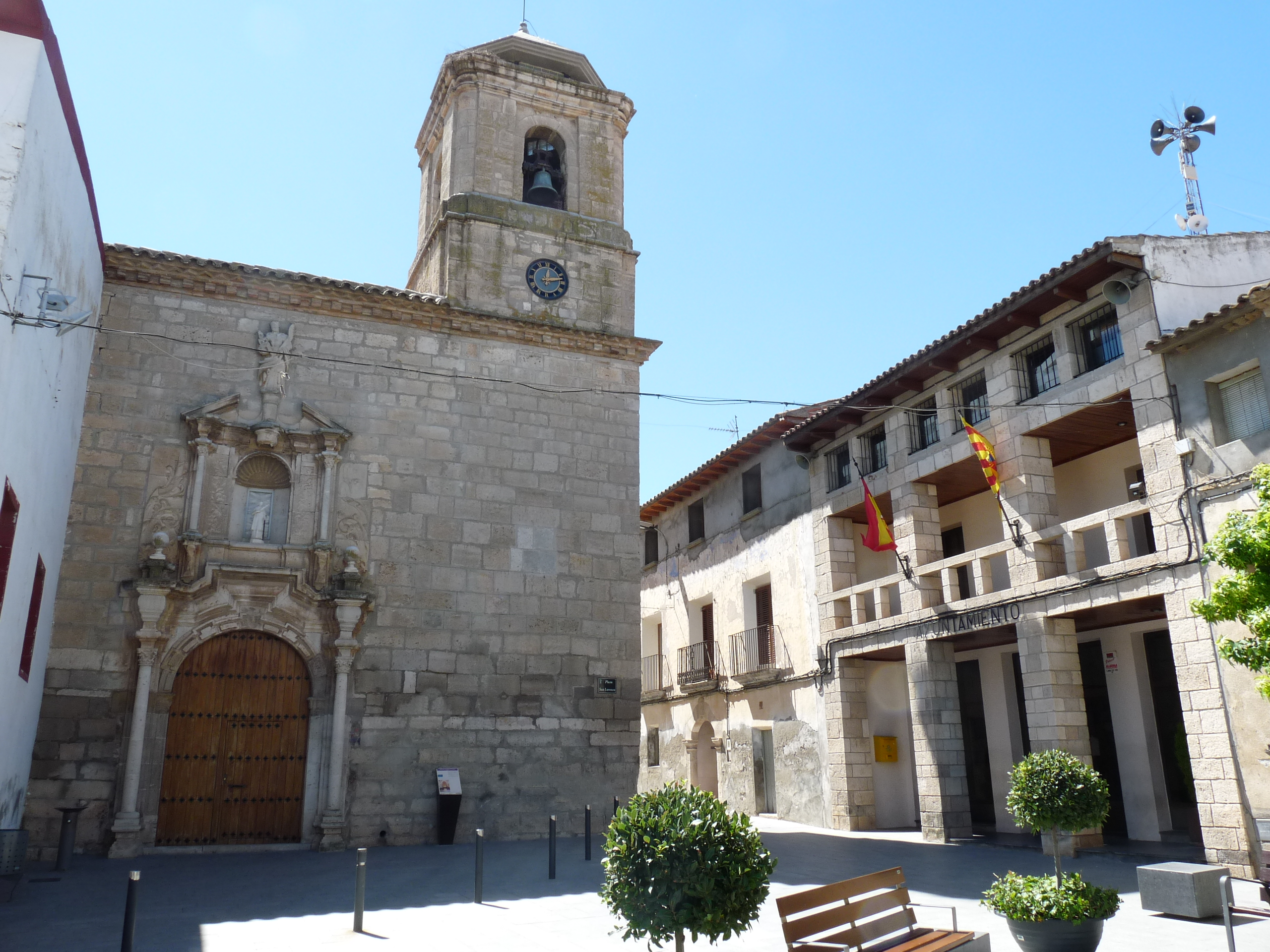

- Coat of arms
- Interactive map of Velilla de Cinca/Vilella de Cinca
- Country: Spain
- Autonomous community: Aragon
- Province: Huesca

Area
  - Total: 16 km^{2} (6.2 sq mi)

Population (2025-01-01)
  - Total: 505
  - Density: 32/km^{2} (82/sq mi)
- Time zone: UTC+1 (CET)
  - Summer (DST): UTC+2 (CEST)

Velilla de Cinca (Spanish: [beˈliʎa ðe ˈθiŋka]) or Vilella de Cinca (Catalan: [biˈleʎa ðe siŋka]) is a municipality located in the province of Huesca, Aragon, Spain. According to the 2004 census (INE), the municipality has a population of 441 inhabitants.

== See also ==
- Bajo Cinca/Baix Cinca
