= Jane Godia =

Kenyan Journalist

- Born: Jane Godia
- Education: University of Nairob
- Employers: African Gender and Media Initiative (GEM); African Woman and Child Feature Services; Standard Group
- Organization: member of the Commonwealth group
- Known for: Journalist; editor; trainer

Jane Godia is a Kenyan journalist, editor, trainer, and a member of the Commonwealth group observer for Sierra Leone Elections. She is a former acting Managing Director of African Gender and Media Initiative (GEM) Trust and Director at Women In News, Africa. She worked as an editor at The African Woman and Child Feature Services. Godia is also a former Deputy Managing Editor at the Standard Group and a graduate of the University of Nairobi.
