= Chalamera =

- municipality
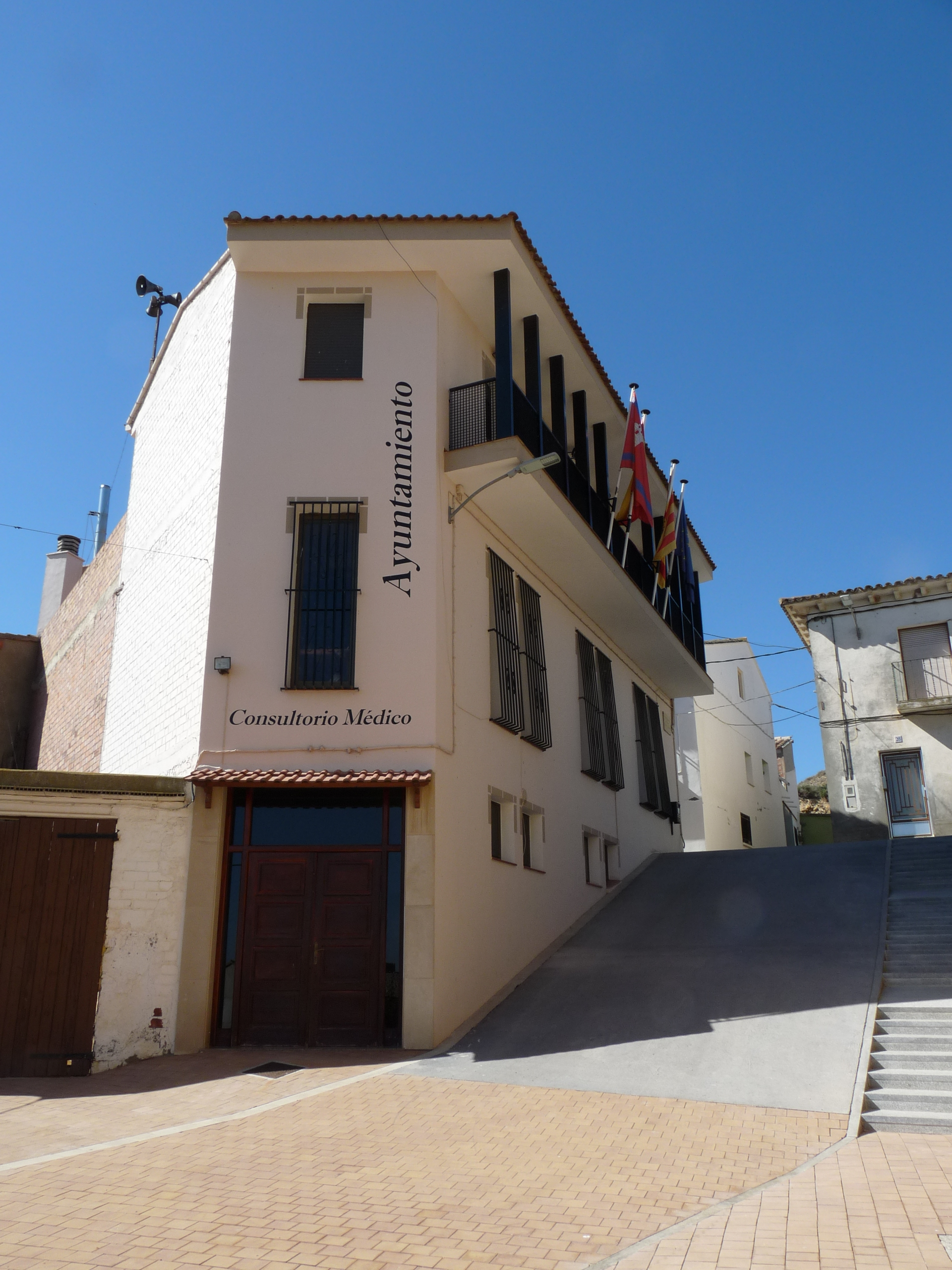
- Town hall

- Flag Coat of arms

- Location in Spain
- Coordinates: 41°40′N 0°10′E
- Country: Spain
- Autonomous community: Aragon
- Province: Huesca

Area
  - Total: 11 km^{2} (4.2 sq mi)

Population (2025-01-01)
  - Total: 120
  - Density: 11/km^{2} (28/sq mi)
- Time zone: UTC+1 (CET)
  - Summer (DST): UTC+2 (CEST)

Chalamera (Spanish: [tʃalaˈmeɾa]) is a municipality located in the province of Huesca, Aragon, Spain. According to the 2004 census (INE), the municipality has a population of 153 inhabitants.

== Notable people ==
- Ramón J. Sender (1901–1982), novelist, essayist and journalist

== See also ==
- List of municipalities in Huesca
