= Torrente de Cinca =

Coordinates: 41°28′N 0°20′E

Torrente de Cinca/Torrent de Cinca
- municipality
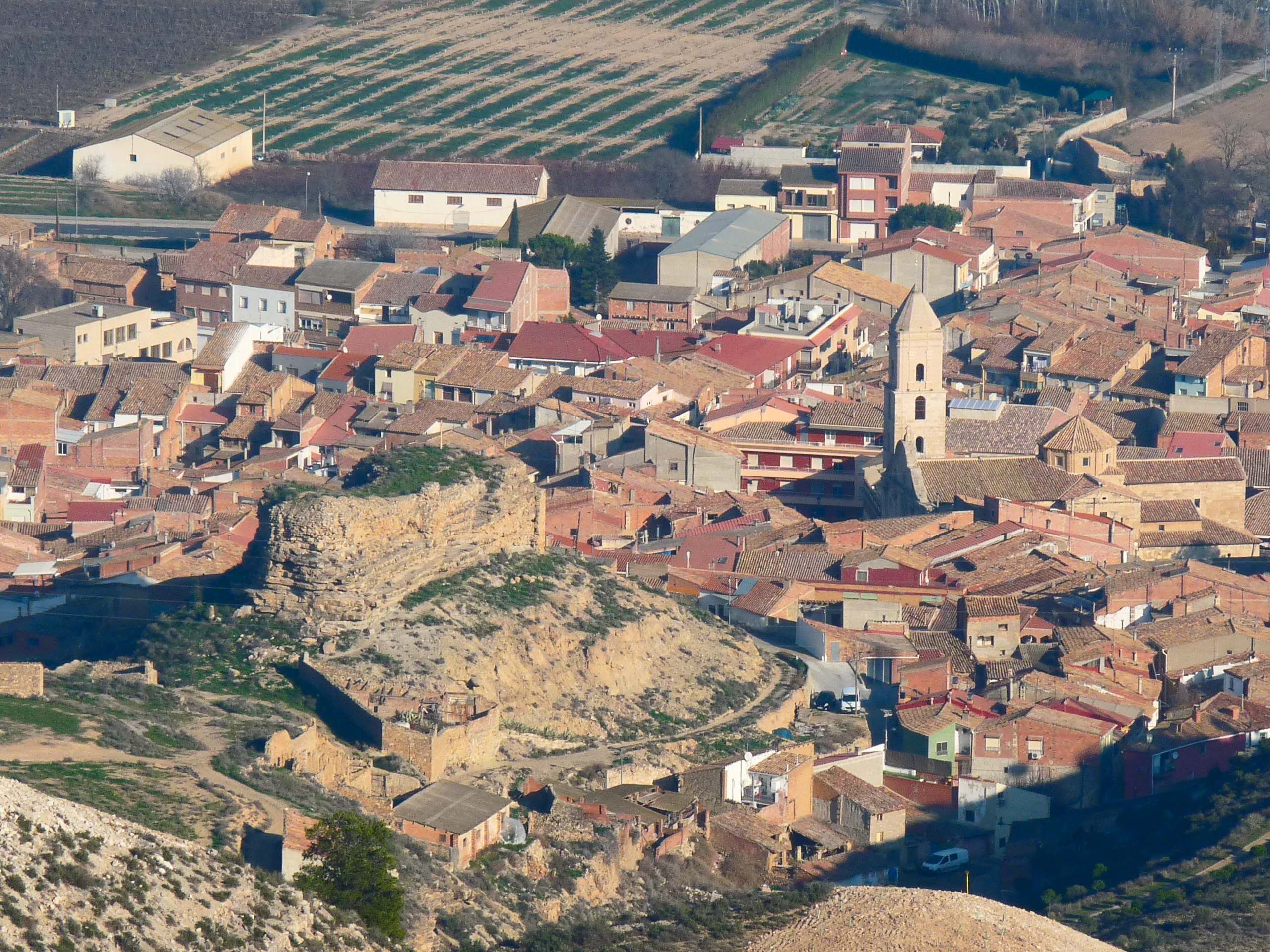
- Interactive map of Torrente de Cinca/Torrent de Cinca
- Country: Spain
- Autonomous community: Aragon
- Province: Huesca
- Municipality: Torrente de Cinca/Torrent de Cinca

Area
  - Total: 56.77 km^{2} (21.92 sq mi)
- Elevation: 109 m (358 ft)

Population (2025-01-01)
  - Total: 1,037
  - Density: 18.27/km^{2} (47.31/sq mi)
- Time zone: UTC+1 (CET)
  - Summer (DST): UTC+2 (CEST)

Torrente de Cinca (Spanish: [toˈrente ðe ˈθiŋka]) or Torrent de Cinca (Catalan: [toˈren de ˈsiŋka]) is a municipality located in the province of Huesca, Aragon, Spain. According to the 2004 census (INE), the municipality has a population of 1,002 inhabitants.

== See also ==
- List of municipalities in Huesca
