= Jesús Moncada =

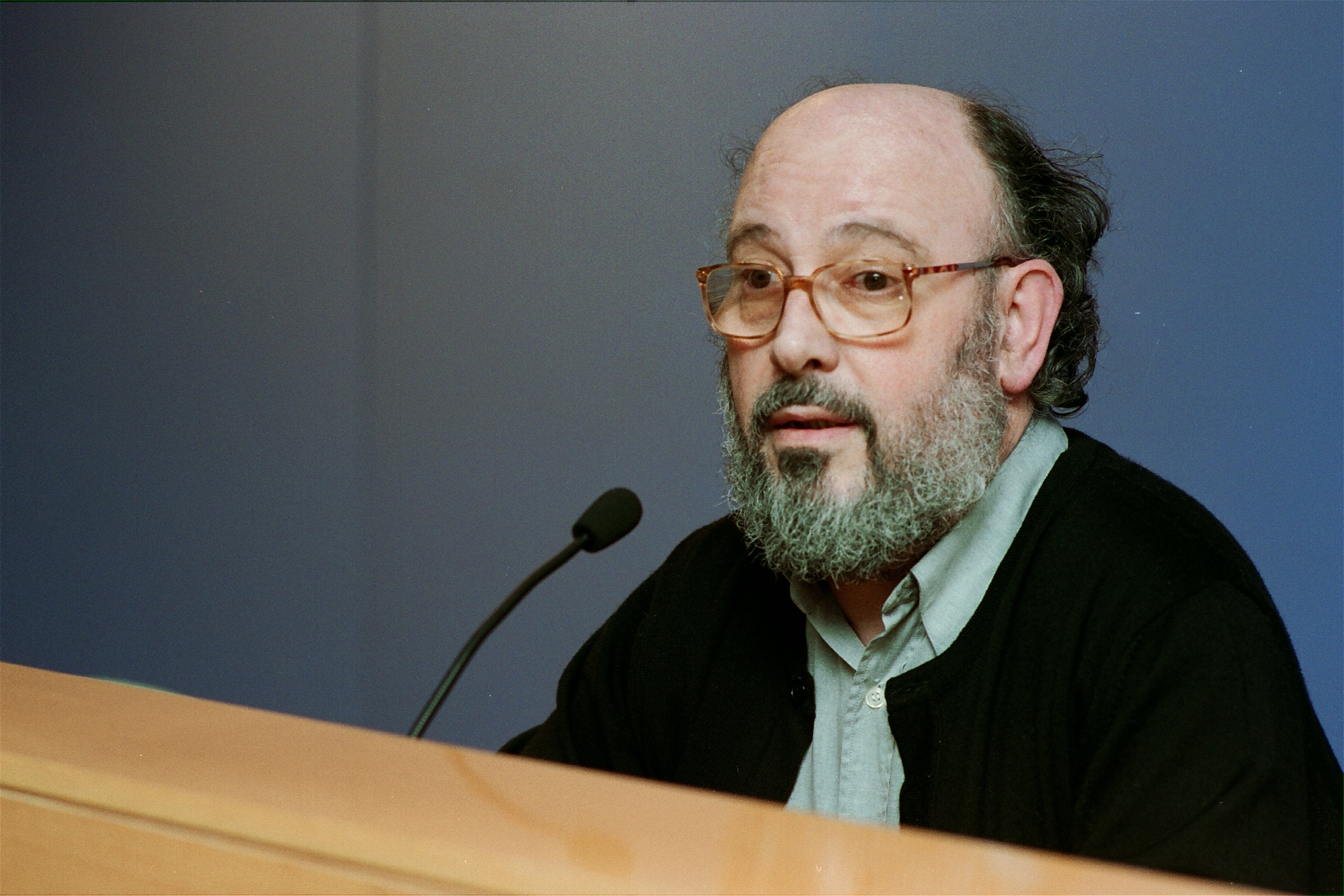

Jesús Moncada i Estruga (Catalan pronunciation: [ʒəˈzuz muŋˈkaða]; Mequinenza, 1941 – Barcelona, 13 June 2005) was a narrator and translator. His work is a re-creation, somewhere between realism and fantasy, of the mythical past of the old town of Mequinenza -now submerged beneath the waters of the river Ebro-.

Considered one of the most important Catalan authors of his time, he received various prizes for his work, among them the Premio Ciutat de Barcelona and the Premio Nacional de la Crítica in 1989 for Camí de sirga (The Towpath) and the Creu de Sant Jordi, awarded by the Generalitat de Catalunya in 2001. In 2004—a few months before his death—he received the Premio de las Letras Aragonesas.

Moncada is one of the most translated authors of Catalan literature. Camí de sirga has been translated into fifteen languages, among them Japanese and Vietnamese. He also translated into Catalan many Spanish, French, and English works of authors such as Guillaume Apollinaire, Alexandre Dumas, père, Jules Verne, and Boris Vian.

On 9 July 2005 he returned to Mequinenza (in Catalan, Mequinensa), where he was awarded the title of "favorite son." He died on 13 June 2005 from cancer. His ashes were scattered in the noble house of old Mequinenza, now inundated by the Ribarroja reservoir, where he was born and where his works are set, under the watchful eye of his mother, his siblings -Rosa Mari and Albert-, his brother-in-law and nephew, and the neighbors of Mequinenza.

== Novels ==
- Camí de sirga (The Towpath) (1988)

The novel tells the story of a town situated at the confluence of two great rivers, the Ebro and the Segre, through the memories of its inhabitants. This avalanche of memories piles up until the 20th century, and is provoked by the construction of a reservoir and the imminent flooding of the town. The book also contains some reflections about history, memory, fiction and about the lies they all involve. The general tone is nostalgic, without being bitter, but some of the personalities and situations are also comic. It evokes:
- the hypocrisy and cruelty of human relations in a town in which everyone knows everybody
- the influence of history -the First World War in Europe and the Spanish Civil War- on the history of the town,
- the economic system at work in the town and the Ebro valley.

- La galeria de les estàtues (The Statue Gallery) (1992)

Unlike the other two novels, La galeria de les estàtues is set mainly in the fictional town of Torrelloba rather than in Mequinenza. It relates the tragic story of Dalmau Campells and his family during the tension and repression of Francoist Spain.

- Estremida memòria (Shaken Memory) (1997)

This novel revolves around events that shook the community of Mequinenza in 1877, when four of the townspeople were executed for murder and robbery. More than a hundred years later, the community is still wounded by the legacy of what happened, as becomes clear when a writer finds a report of the events written at the time by a local court scribe. As he investigates further in order to write a book about what happened, he finds that he has disturbed the past and angered some of the present-day residents of Mequinenza who would rather have left the episode safely buried in the past.

== Short stories ==
- Històries de la mà esquerra i altres narracions (Stories of the Left Hand) (1981)
- El cafè de la granota (The Frog Café) (1985)
- Calaveres atònites (Astonished Skulls), collection of short, humorous stories. The action takes place in post-war Mequinenza) (1999)
- Riada (2000)
- Contes (compilation of his first three books of short stories) (2001)
- Cabòries estivals i altres proses volanderes (2003)

== Quotes about their work ==
"Moncada blends the real and the fantastic in the manner of Gabriel García Márquez, and his episodic style may remind some readers of the Colombian novelist's treatment of events in the town of Macondo in One Hundred Years of Solitude. Such a comparison is not mere reviewers' hyperbole: this is a rich, humorous and moving novel, sensitively translated into English, which should herald a glittering future for its author."

(Euan Cameron. "Rich view from the banks of the Ebro", Review of The Towpath, The European)

== Legacy ==
The personal archive of Jesús Moncada was entrusted to the Universitat Autònoma de Barcelona by his sister, Rosa Maria Moncada. It is now housed in the university’s Humanities Library, thanks to the support of the Departments of Catalan Philology and of Translation and Interpreting. The donation was coordinated by Montserrat Bacardí and Francesc Foguet, lecturers at the UAB, along with Hèctor Moret, a family friend and scholar of Moncada’s work.

The Jesús Moncada Archive comprises a selection of the writer’s personal and professional materials. It includes drafts of literary works, photographs, drawings, correspondence, and various personal and professional documents.
