= Diocese of Tortosa =

Roman Catholic diocese in Spain

Coordinates: 40°48′49.39″N 0°31′17.61″E

Diocese of Tortosa Dioecesis Dertosensis Diócesis de Tortosa (es) Diòcesi de Tortosa (ca)

Catholic
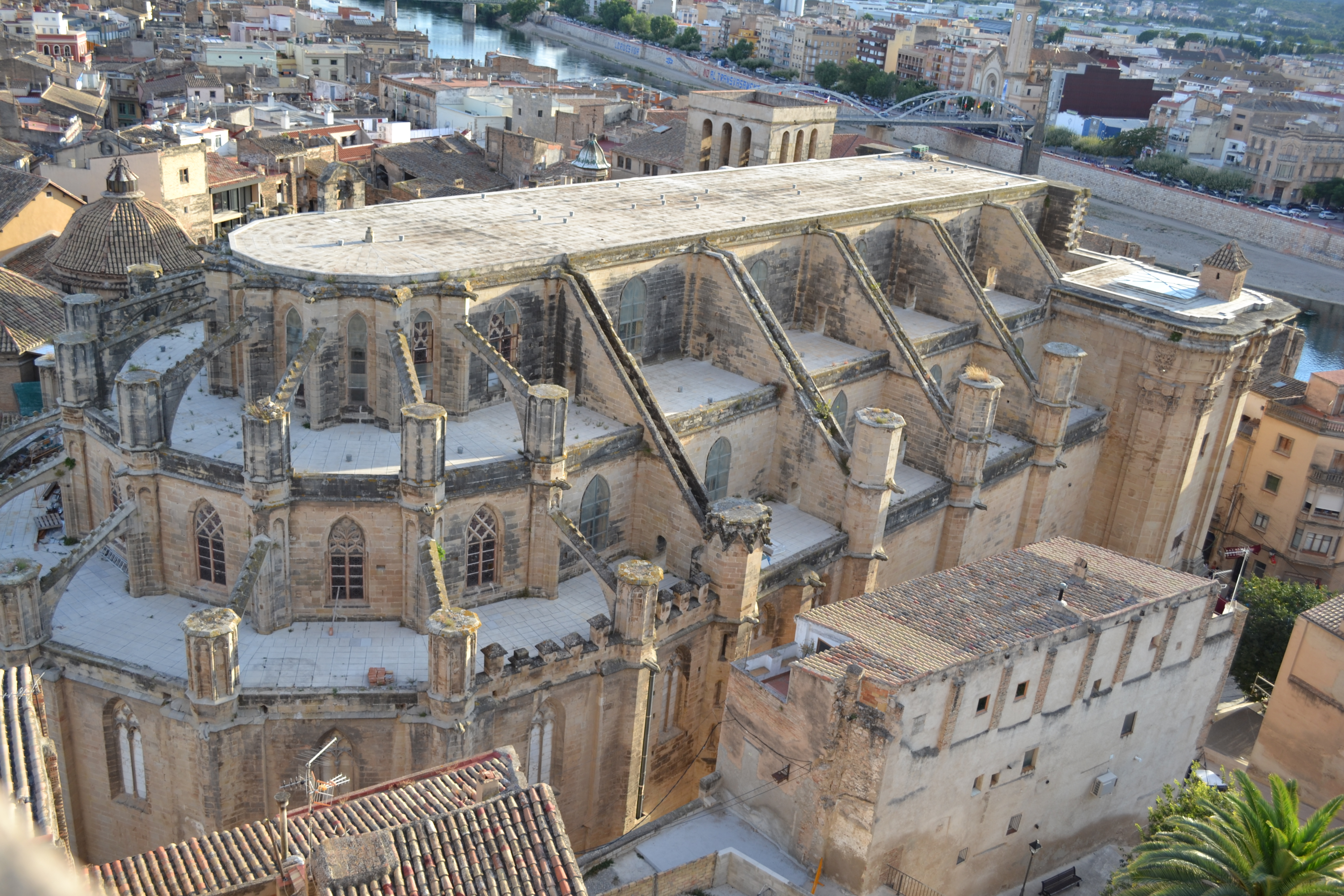
- Tortosa Cathedral

Location
- Country: Spain
- Ecclesiastical province: Tarragona
- Metropolitan: Tarragona

Statistics
- Area: 6,450 km^{2} (2,490 sq mi)
- Population: Total; Catholics: (as of 2010); 292,662; 260,449 (89%)

Information
- Sui iuris church: Latin Church
- Rite: Roman Rite
- Established: 4th Century
- Cathedral: Cathedral Basilica of Our Lady of Sorrow in Tortosa

Current leadership
- Pope: Leo XIV
- Bishop: Sergi Gordo Rodríguez
- Metropolitan Archbishop: Joan Planellas i Barnosell

Map

Website
- Website of the Diocese

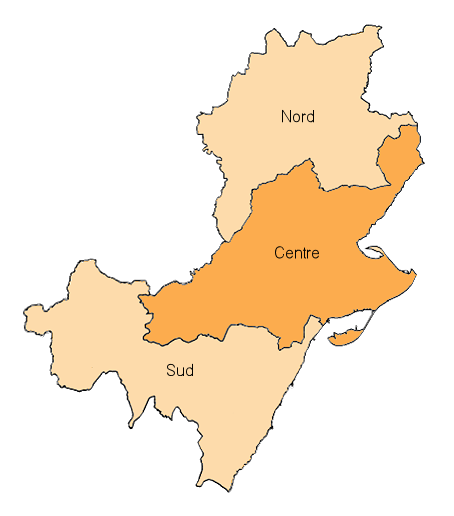
Zones of the diocese.

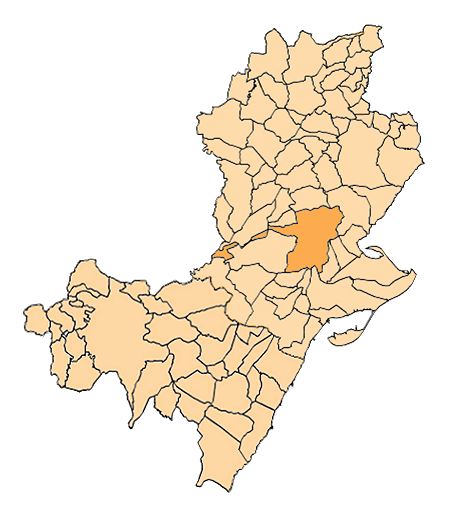
Territorial municipal divisions of the diocese

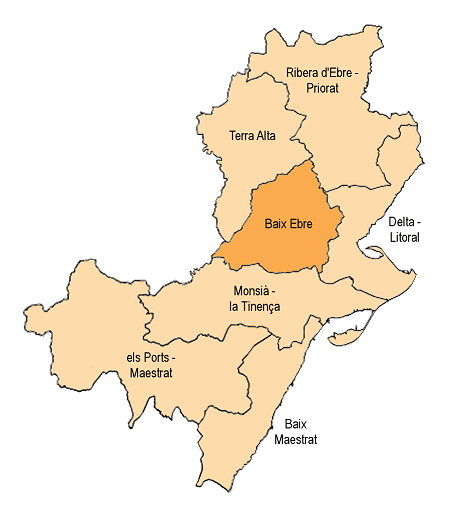
Territorial Archpriest divisions of the diocese

The Diocese of Tortosa (Latin: Dioecesis Dertosensis) is a Latin Church diocese of the Catholic Church covering the south of Catalonia and the north of the Valencian Community. It is a suffragan diocese of the Archdiocese of Tarragona.

== History ==
The Diocese of Tortosa gives a certain foundation to an ancient historical region that, despite having no political representation, shares common historical, cultural and linguistic ties. This territory is known as Ilercavonia in academic and scientific circles.

The territory of the historical Diocese of Tortosa was greatly reduced during General Franco's dictatorship, following the Concordat of 1953 between the Francoist regime and the Vatican. Under the pretext of adapting the dioceses to the civil provincial limits the Consistorial Congregation, bending to the wishes of the dictator, broke up the traditional region of the Diocese of Tortosa:

- On the 2d September 1955, the Cesaraugustanae et aliarum decree of the Consistorial Congregation was published and the following year the parishes of Arenys de Lledó, Calaceit, Cretes and Lledó d'Algars in Matarranya, doing away with the traditional Aragonese parishes of the Diocese of Tortosa. Meanwhile, Betxí, an enclave of the Diocese of Teruel, was briefly added (1956–1960) to the Diocese of Tortosa and Maials was transferred to the Roman Catholic Diocese of Lleida.
- Following the De mutatione finium Dioecesium Valentinae-Segorbicensis-Dertotensis decree, of 31 May 1960, the parishes of Nules, Vila-real, Castelló de la Plana, Lucena and Albocàsser that had historically belonged to the Diocese of Tortosa were aggregated to the Diocese of Segorbe-Castellón along with the parish of Betxí. Francoist propaganda presented the changes as an occasion for rejoicing.

== See also ==
- Roman Catholic Diocese of Lleida
- Roman Catholic Diocese of Segorbe-Castellón
- Ilercavonia
