= La Portellada =

- municipality
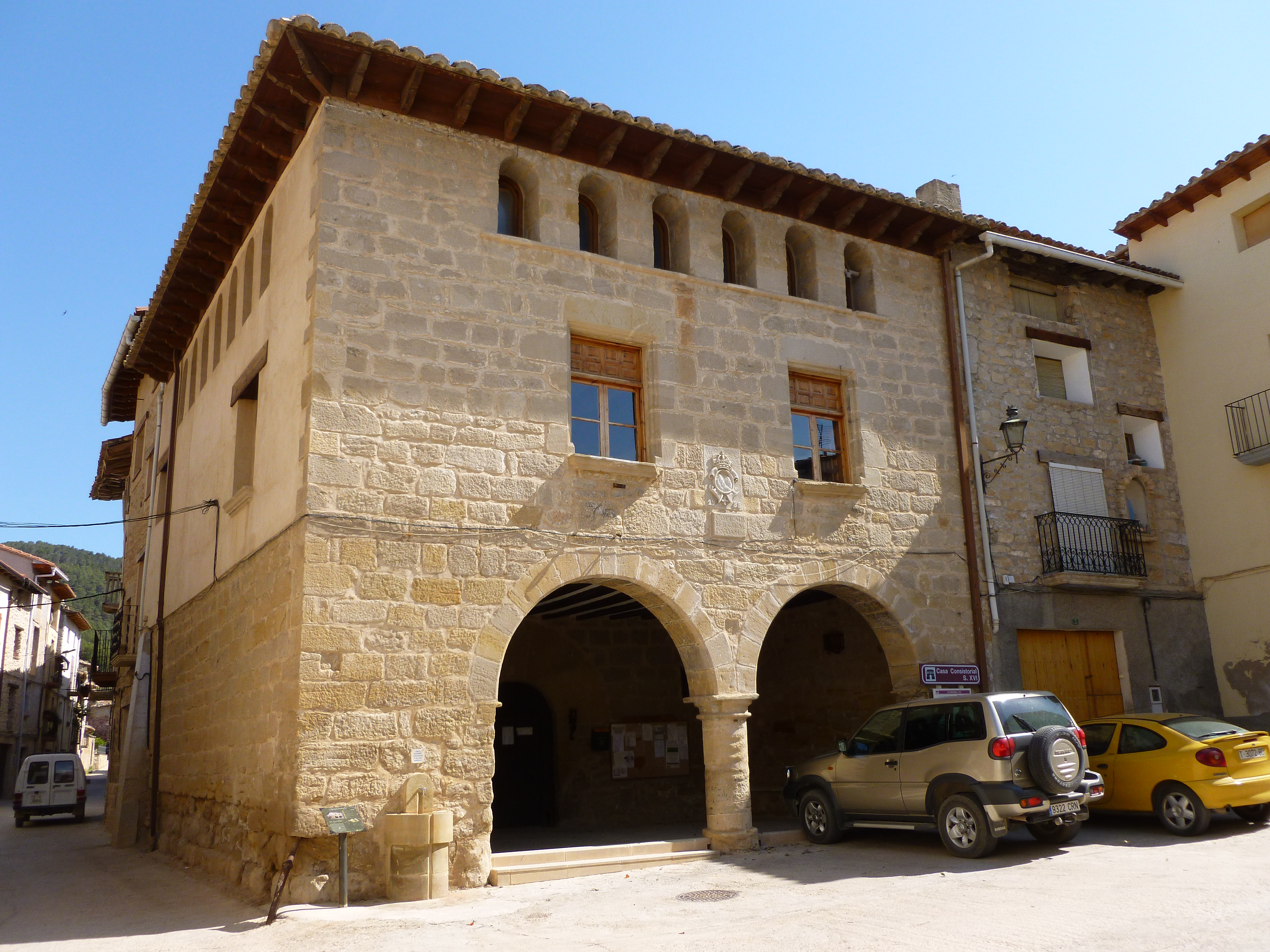

- Location of La Portellada within Aragon Location of La Portellada within Spain
- Coordinates: 40°53′N 0°4′E
- Country: Spain
- Autonomous community: Aragon
- Province: Teruel

Area
  - Total: 21.37 km^{2} (8.25 sq mi)
- Elevation: 569 m (1,867 ft)

Population (2025-01-01)
  - Total: 249
  - Density: 11.7/km^{2} (30.2/sq mi)
- Time zone: UTC+1 (CET)
  - Summer (DST): UTC+2 (CEST)

La Portellada (Spanish: [la poɾteˈʎaða]; Catalan: [la poɾteˈʎaða]) is a municipality in the Matarraña/Matarranya comarca, province of Teruel, Aragon, Spain. According to the 2004 census (INE), the municipality has a population of 277 inhabitants.

== Geography ==
=== Bordering localities ===
- La Fresneda
- Ráfales
- Fórnoles
- Valderrobres

== Economy ==
- Agriculture
  - Olive trees, olive oil is a major source of income for this town, the oil belongs to the Denomination of Origin Aragon.
  - Almonds are another source of income.
  - Cereal
- Livestock
  - Swine
  - Sheep and goats
  - Rabbits
  - Fowl

== Monuments ==
=== Religious sites ===
- Church of Saints Cosmas and Damian
- Chapel of San Miguel (recreation area)
- Piton de San Pedro Martir
- Virgen del Portillo

=== Industrial Architecture ===
- Former "Waterfall mill" (Molí del Salt)

=== Landforms ===
- "The Waterfall" (El Salt). A waterfall in the Tastavins river, about 20 feet high.

=== Other ===
- "Gavella Pi" (Pine Gavella)
- "Torreta de Ferro" (Iron Tower)

== Celebrations ==
- Major
  - Celebrations in Honor of San Cosme and San Damian on September 27, and San Miguel on September 29
- Minor
  - San Anton January 17
  - St. Agatha on February 5
  - San Pedro Mártir April 29
  - First Easter (Easter Monday)
  - Second Passover

== Typical products ==
- Olives of the Portellada
- Cured ham (D.O. Jamón de Teruel)
- Casquetes
- Almonds
- Rosca de tallaes (cake with chunks of marinated beef), typical of Easter

== See also ==
- List of municipalities in Teruel
