= Andrés Piquer =

Spanish writer (1711–1772)

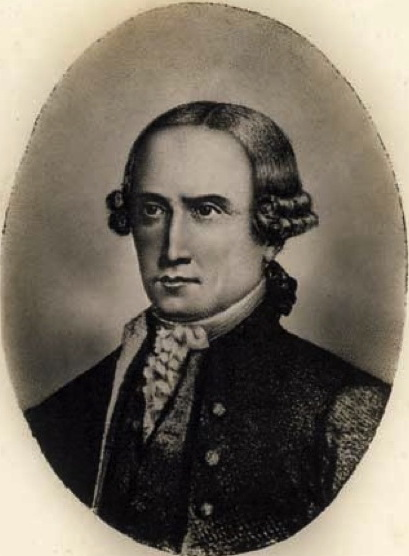
Andrés Piquer Arrufat

Andrés Piquer (1711–1772) was a Spanish physician, philosopher, logician, writer and author. During the eighteenth century, a critique and re-evaluation of the Hippocratic Corpus within Spanish universities was pushed by Galenist scholars. Piquer contributed to this analysis of the corpus and served as a philosopher and doctor to the Kings Ferdinand VI and Charles III.

Piquer is recognized for his translations of Hippocratic treatises from ancient Greek to Spanish and his efforts to transform medical university instruction in Spain to follow Hippocratic theory. Piquer's translation and commentary of Epidemics 1 and 3, and partially Epidemic 2, are noteworthy. His medical and physiological work relates to Hippocrates and the medical theories of Thomas Sydenham, 'the English Hippocrates', who is recognized for his work Observationes Medicae (1676).

== Early years ==
Piquer was the son of an Aragonese father and a Valencian mother. He studied Latin and grammar in the town of La Fresneda, Aragon. In 1727, at age 16, he moved to Valencia. In 1734, he graduated from the University of Valencia as a student of philosophy and medicine.

== Career ==
=== First publications ===
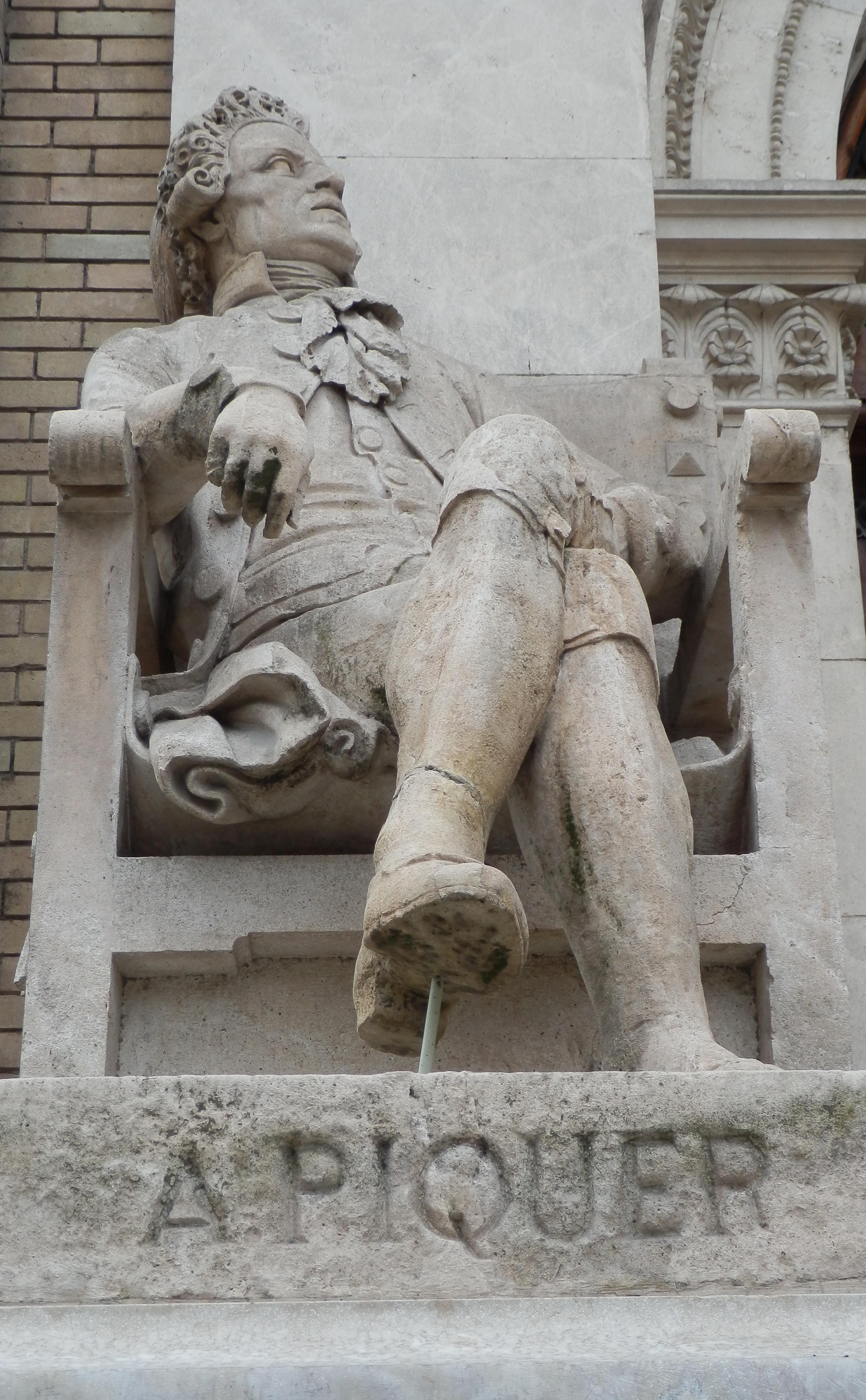
Andrés Piquer statue in the Auditorium of the University of Zaragoza

Piquer published his first work, Medicina Vetus Et Nova, in 1735 in order to gain important positions at the General Hospital of Valencia and at the University of Valencia. He was appointed by the university to conduct health research in the city and nearby regions.

In 1741 Piquer became friends with Gregorio Mayans. With Mayans's assistance, Piquer was appointed chair of Anatomy at the University of Valencia in 1742, and shortly afterwards became a doctor at the General Hospital of Valencia. While holding these positions, Piquer published Thesis Medico-anatomicae, which emphasized the importance of dissection and microscopic investigation. Piquer also collaborated with Mayans at the Valencian Academy, which Mayans founded in 1742.

In 1745 Piquer published the first volume of Modern, rational, and experimental physics. This text concerned various subjects. For instance, he referred to fossils as "figurative stones", and he denounced creationism by claiming that the stones were petrified remains of living beings.

He published Modern Logic in 1747, and Tratado de Calenturas in 1751.

=== Transfer to the Court ===
In 1751, Piquer was appointed doctor to Fernando VI and moved to Madrid.

In 1752, he was appointed vice president of the Royal Medical Academy and member of the Royal Protomedical Tribunal.

As a reward for his royal service and upon Piquer's request, the king funded the construction of a church in Fórnoles, Piquer's hometown. This church was simply known as "El Iglesia de Fórnoles" (The Church of Fórnoles), and featured the highest tower in the province of Teruel.

== Works ==
Piquer wrote in Latin and Castilian. As a philosopher, he favored eclecticism. Piquer was influenced by Hippocrates. His work as a physician married Hippocratic theory with experimental medicine. Piquer followed Scholasticism but was influenced by foreign ideas of Enlightenment. As a result, he became one of the leading figures of Novatores in the early Spanish Enlightenment period.

His first book on rational and experimental modern physics was published in Spanish in 1745. He also authored Modern Logic (1747). Between 1757 and 1770 Piquer translated a three-volume work of Hippocrates into Castilian.

- Vetus et nova Medicine (1735)
- Fevers Treaty (1751)
- Modern Logic (1747)
- Moral Philosophy for Spanish Youth (1755)
- Piquer, Andrés (December 2000). Física moderna racional y experimental. Editorial MAXTOR. ISBN 978-84-95636-10-2.
