= Mont-roig =

Mont-roig may refer to:

- Mont-roig del Camp, Tarragona, Catalonia, Spain
- Mont-roig de Tastavins, or Monroyo, Teruel, Aragon, Spain
