= Matarraña =

Coordinates: 40°53′N 0°8′E

Matarraña/Matarranya
- Comarca
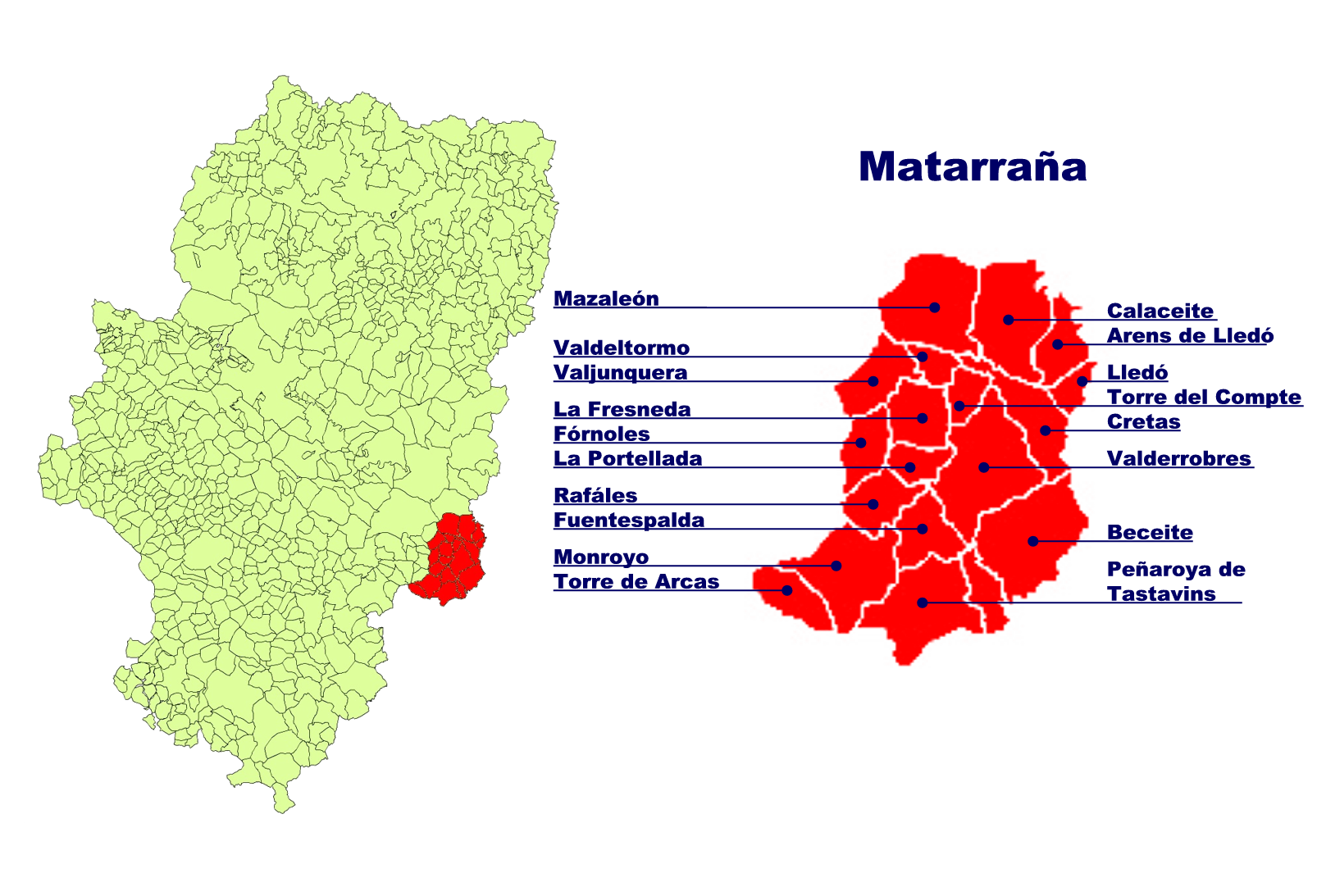
- Country: Spain
- Autonomous community: Aragon
- Province: Teruel
- Capital: Valderrobres/Vall-de-roures
- Municipalities: List: See text

Area
  - Total: 933 km^{2} (360 sq mi)

Population
  - Total: 8,682
  - Density: 9.31/km^{2} (24.1/sq mi)
- Time zone: UTC+1 (CET)
  - Summer (DST): UTC+2 (CEST)

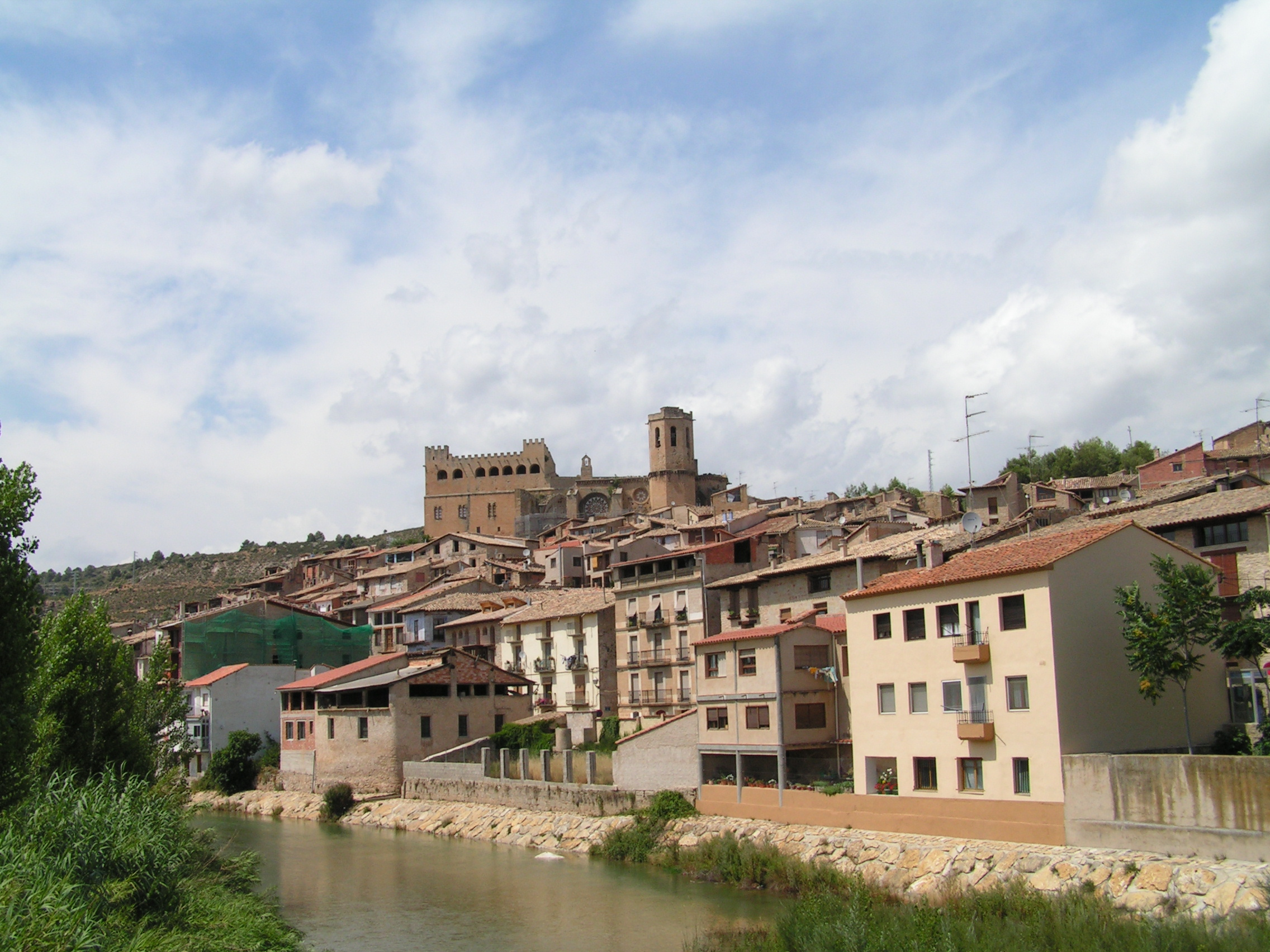
The Matarranya river flowing through the town of Valderrobres (Vall-de-Roures)

Matarraña (Spanish: [mataˈraɲa]) or Matarranya (Catalan: [mataˈraɲa]) is a comarca in eastern Aragon, bordering the Spanish Autonomous Communities of Catalonia and Valencia. It is located in Teruel Province, in the mountainous Sistema Ibérico area.

Its capital is Valderrobres, and it borders the Aragonese comarques of Bajo Aragón-Caspe/Baix Aragó-Casp, and Bajo Aragón, the Catalan comarques of Terra Alta, Baix Ebre, and Montsià, and the Valencian comarques of Baix Maestrat and Ports.

This comarca is named after the Matarranya River flowing through it. It belongs to the Catalan-speaking strip in eastern Aragon known as La Franja.

== Historical comarca ==
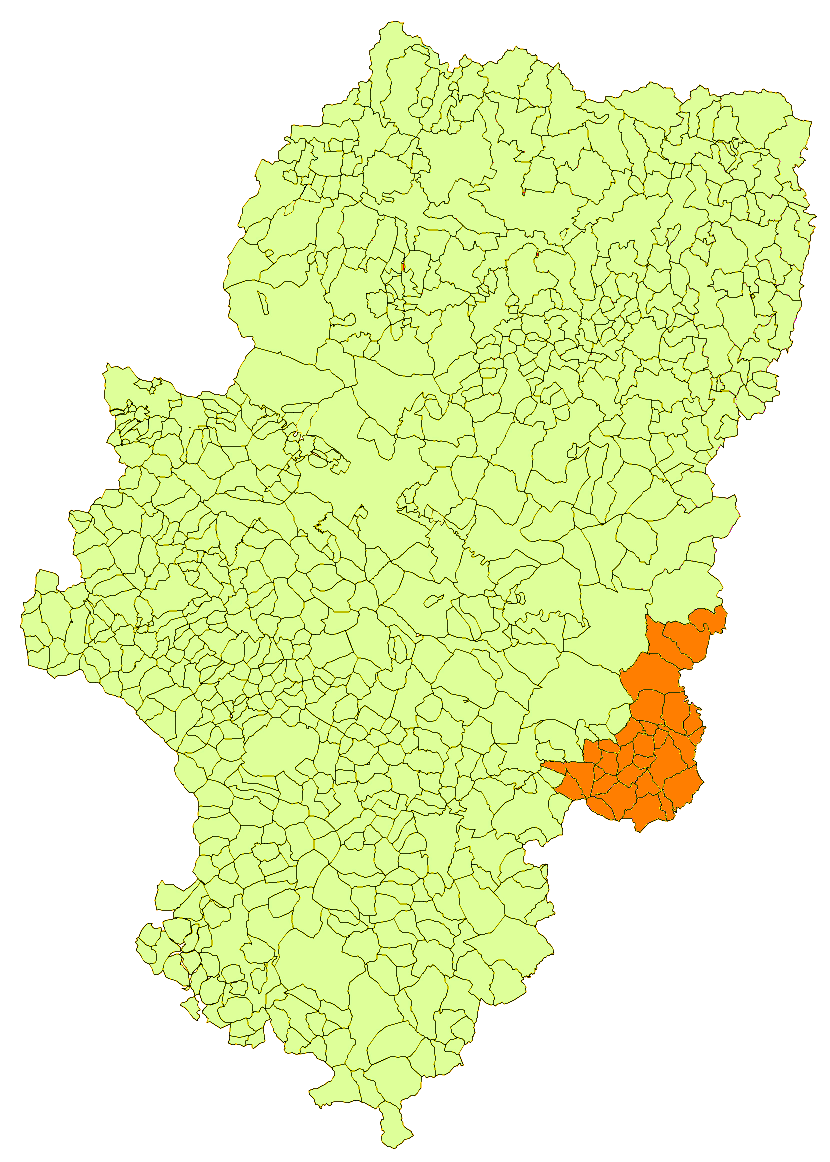
Matarranya historical region in Aragon

The historical Matarranya comarca was a natural region that roughly encompassed the whole Matarranya river basin. The historical comarca was split for administrative purposes when provincial boundaries were traced following the territorial division of Spain in 1833.

After the new divisions were created, the northern section, the Lower Matarranya, became part of the Zaragoza Province while the southern part remained in Teruel Province. This former northern territory, that included the municipalities of Fayón (Faió del Matarranya), Maella and Fabara (Favara del Matarranya), is now the eastern end of the Bajo Aragón-Caspe/Baix Aragó-Casp comarca.

Some of the western municipalities that remained in Teruel Province, Aguaviva (Aiguaviva de Bergantes), Belmonte de San José (Bellmunt de Mesquí), La Cañada de Verich (La Canyada de Beric), La Cerollera (La Sorollera), La Codoñera (La Codonyera), La Ginebrosa and Torrevelilla (La Torre de Vilella) were later segregated from Matarranya and included in the Bajo Aragón comarca.

== Municipal terms ==
The Catalan version of the names of the towns are in brackets.

- Arens de Lledó (Arenys de Lledó)
- Beceite (Beseit)
- Calaceite (Calaceit)
- Cretas (Cretes or Queretes)
- Fórnoles (Fórnols de Matarranya)
- La Fresneda (La Freixneda)
- Fuentespalda (Fontdespatla)
- Lledó (Lledó d'Algars)
- Mazaleón (Massalió)
- Monroyo (Mont-roig de Tastavins)
- Peñarroya de Tastavins (Pena-roja de Tastavins)
- La Portellada
- Ráfales (Ràfels)
- Torre de Arcas (Torredarques)
- Torre del Compte (La Torre del Comte)
- Valdeltormo (La Vall de Tormo)
- Valderrobres (Vall-de-roures)
- Valjunquera (Valljunquera)

== See also ==
- Ilercavonia
- Lower Aragon
- Ports de Tortosa-Beseit
- Roman Catholic Diocese of Tortosa
- The World's Most Extraordinary Homes#Season two (Solo House 2 by Office KGDVS)
