= Tortosa Cathedral =

Cathedral of Saint Mary
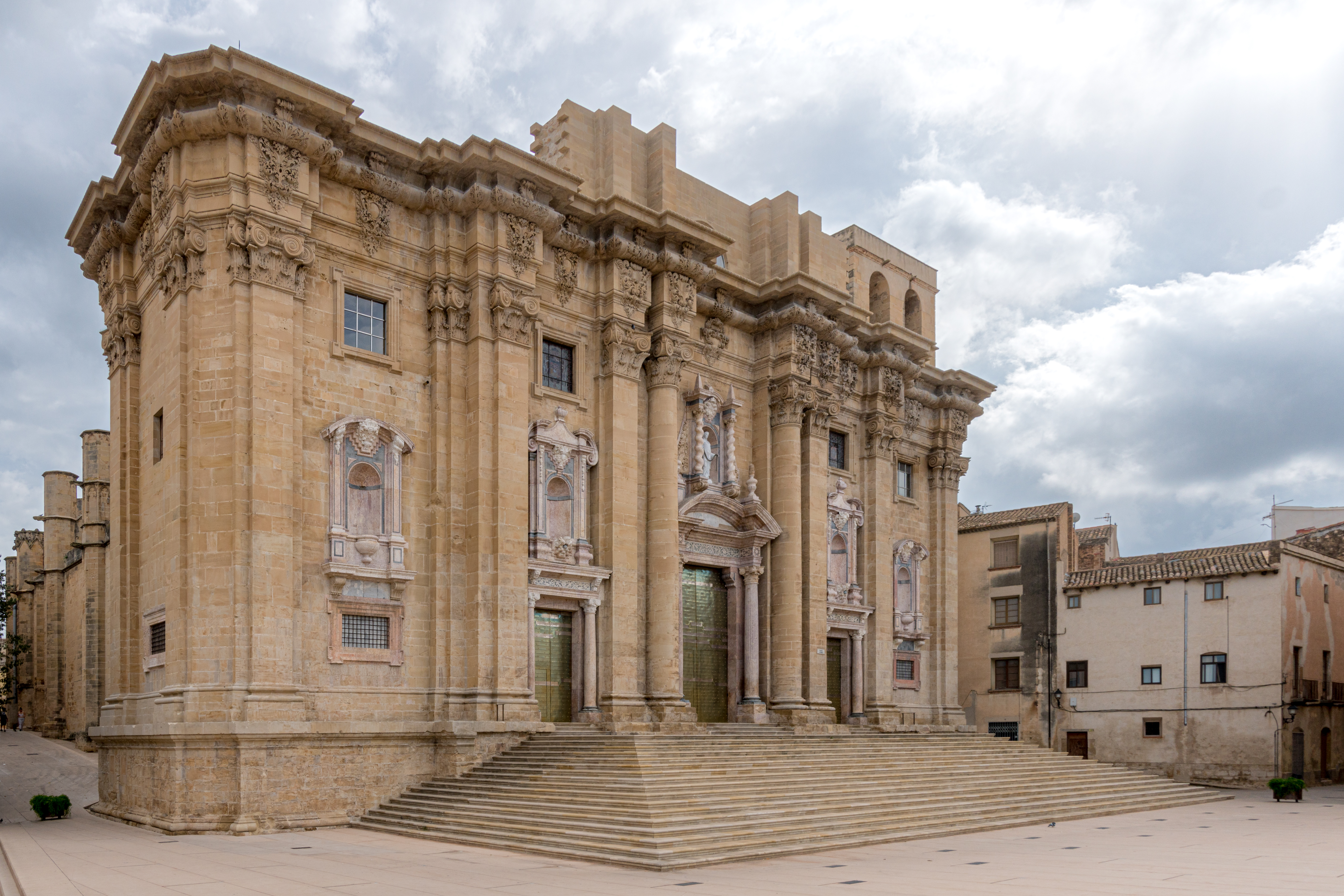
- The cathedral in the midst of the old city

Religion
- Affiliation: Roman Catholic
- Diocese: Tortosa
- Year consecrated: 1447

Location
- Location: Tortosa, Catalonia
- Interactive map of Cathedral of Saint Mary
- Coordinates: 40°48′52″N 0°31′21″E

Architecture
- Type: Cathedral
- Style: Gothic and Baroque
- Groundbreaking: 1347
- Completed: 1757

The Catedral of Saint Mary of Tortosa is a cathedral located in Tortosa, Catalonia, Spain and seat of the Diocese of Tortosa. The present structure is located in the center of the city's old town.

== Design ==
Its construction began in 1347 on the remains of a previous Romanesque cathedral. The cathedral was completed two centuries later. It was designed by Benito Dalguayre and has three naves with chapels between the buttresses and an ambulatory with radial chapels. The church is constructed in the Catalan Gothic style, though the façade, from the 18th century, is Baroque.

The cathedral’s apse has a rare heptagonal plan, a form that presented notable geometric and construction challenges in the Middle Ages because no exact classical method existed for setting out a regular heptagon. Archival drawings and construction records indicate that the apse was laid out using a modular proportional system—centered on a 9:8 ratio linking the radial chapels to the overall plan—rather than through abstract geometric construction.

Archeological excavations on the site revealed that the cathedral was constructed on the site of an older Romanesque church, which was itself built on the site of the old Roman forum of Tortosa.

== Images ==
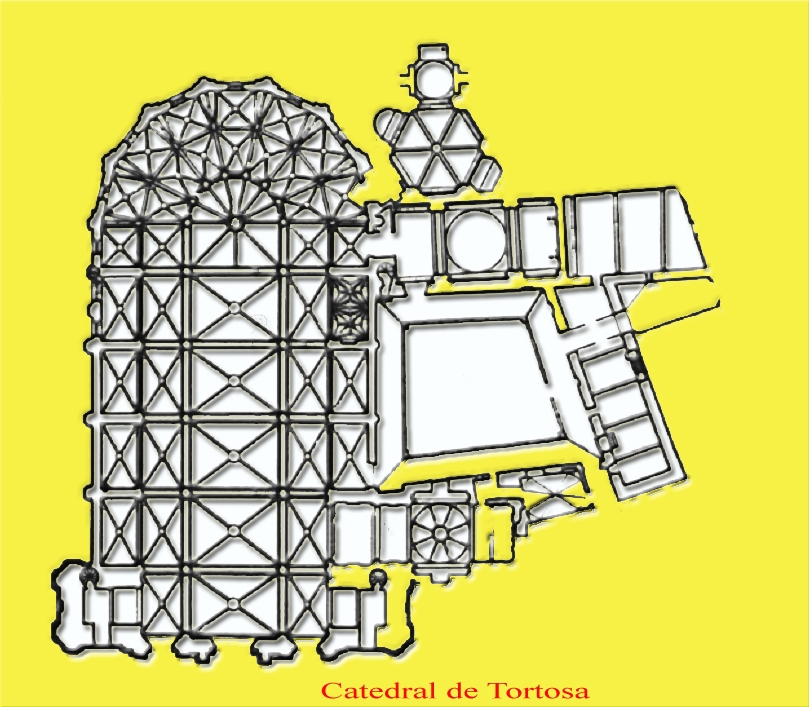
Cathedral plan

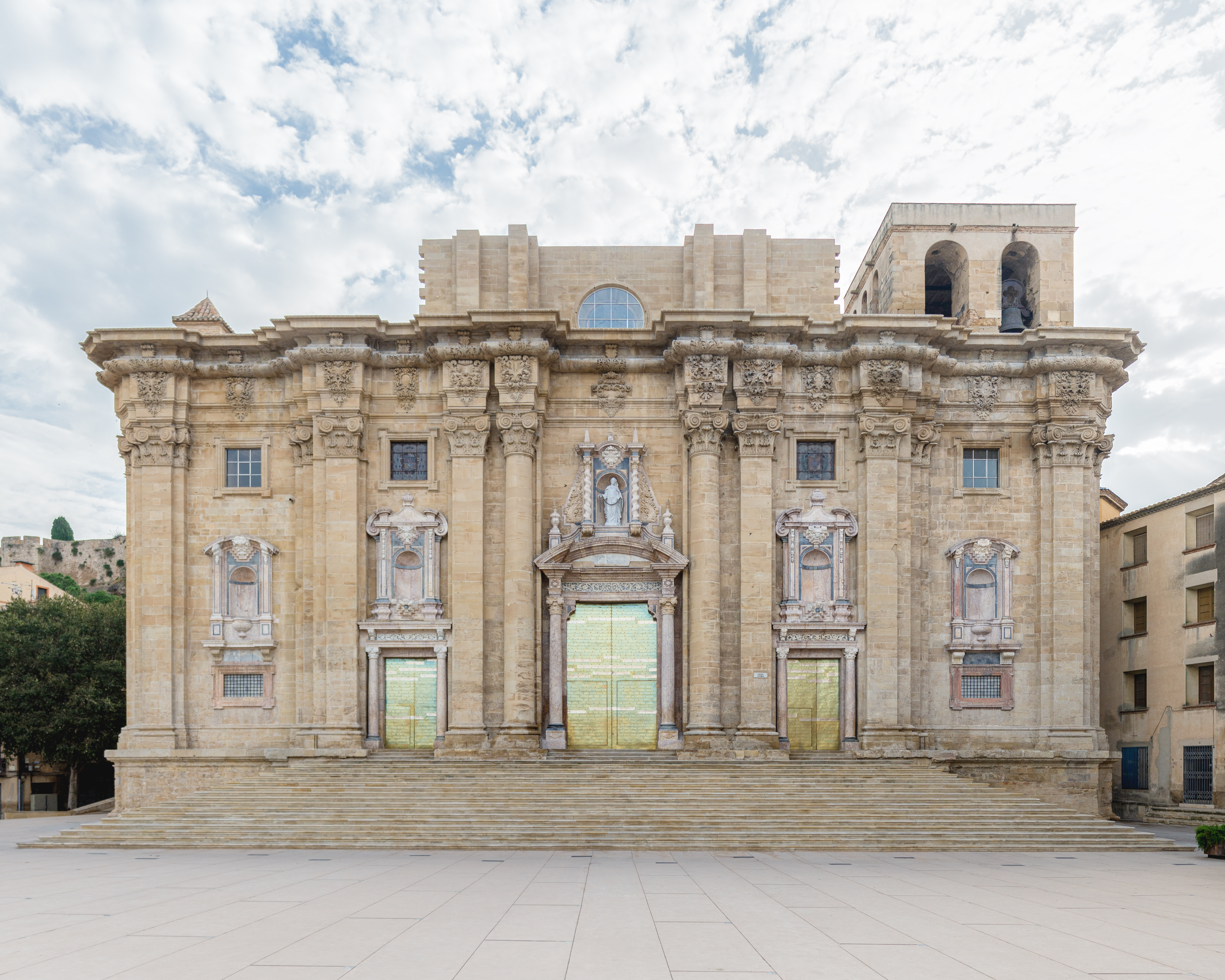
The cathedral's Baroque façade

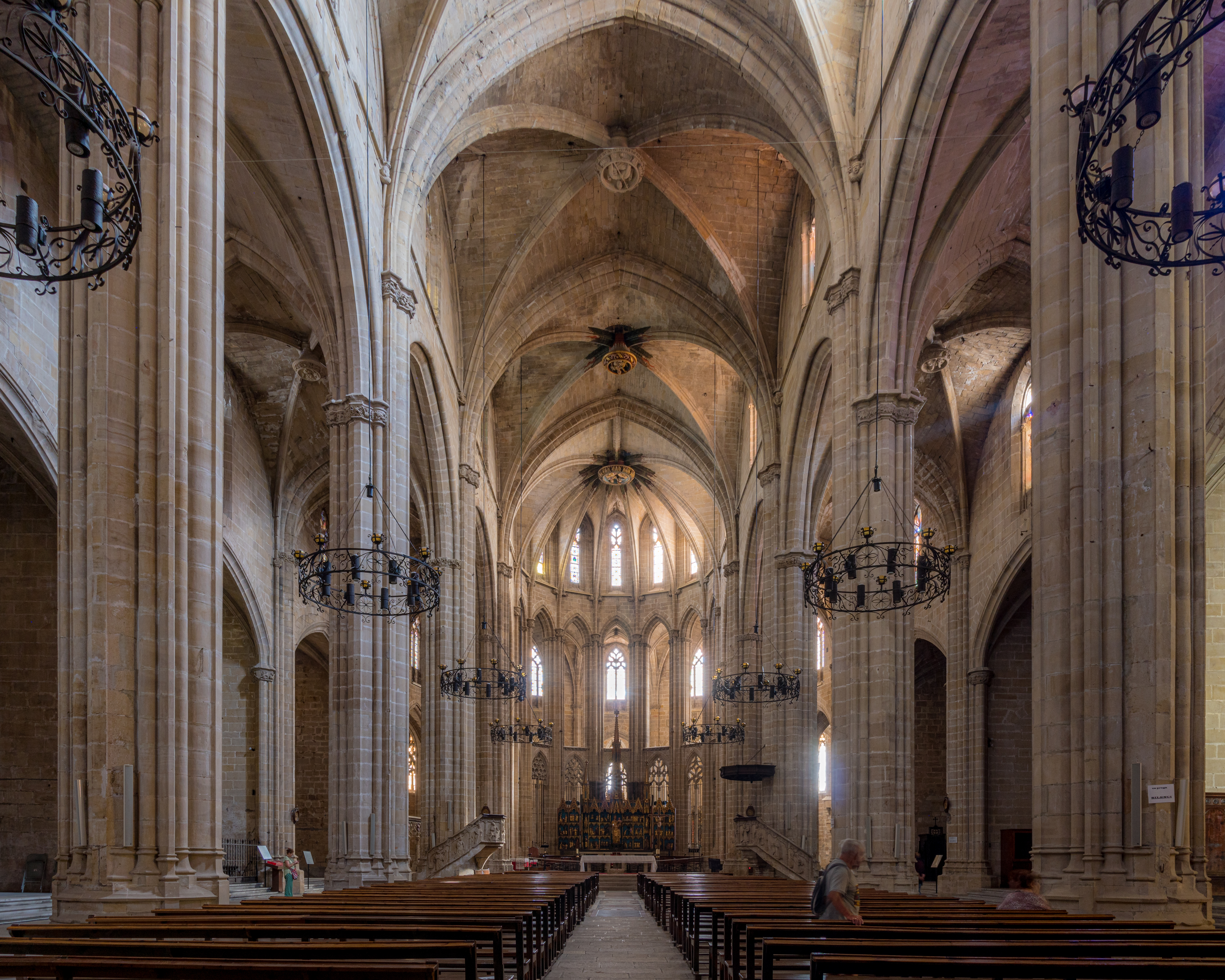
Nave, looking toward the altar

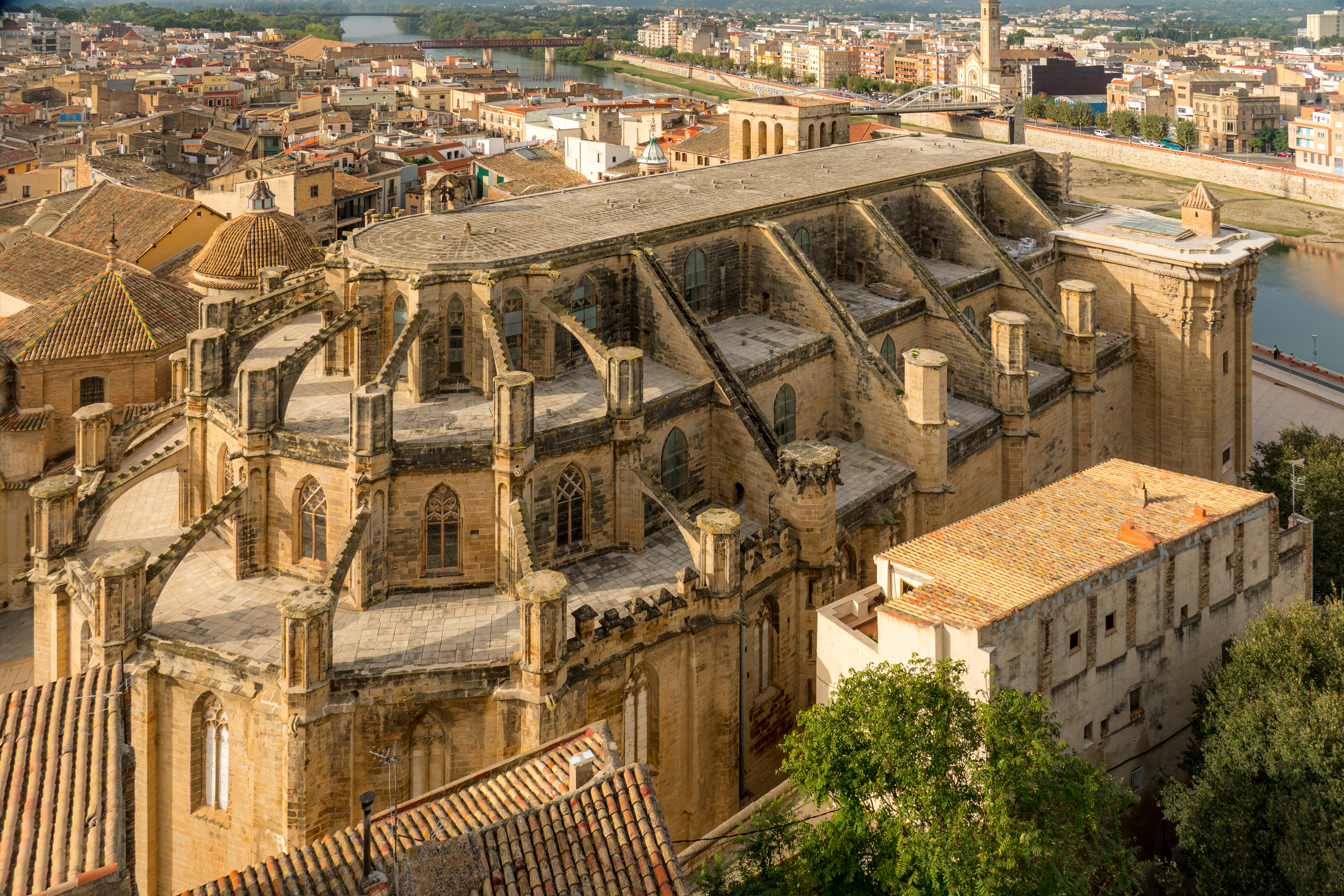
Apse and ambulatory

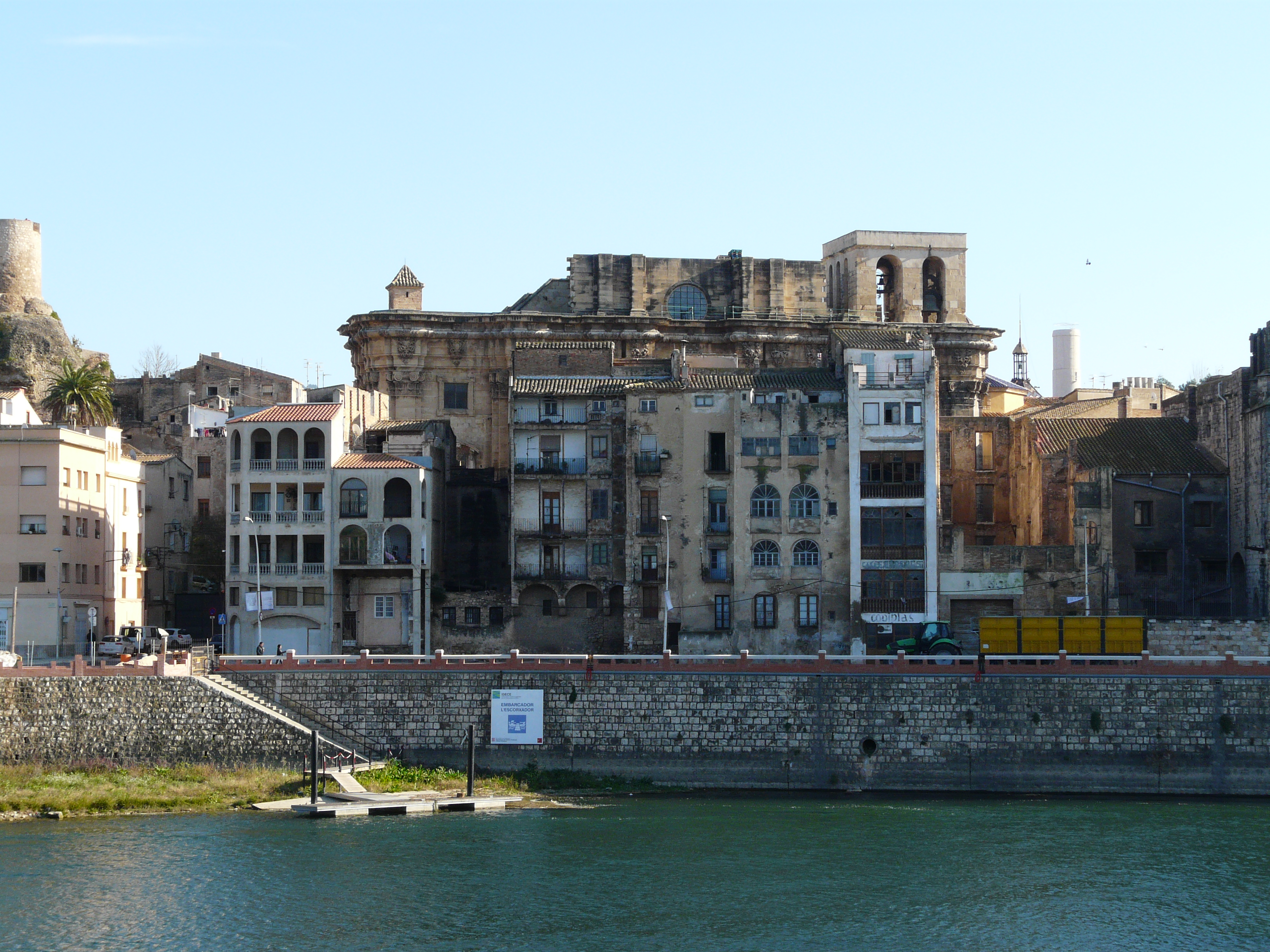
The cathedral was surrounded by buildings until 2015

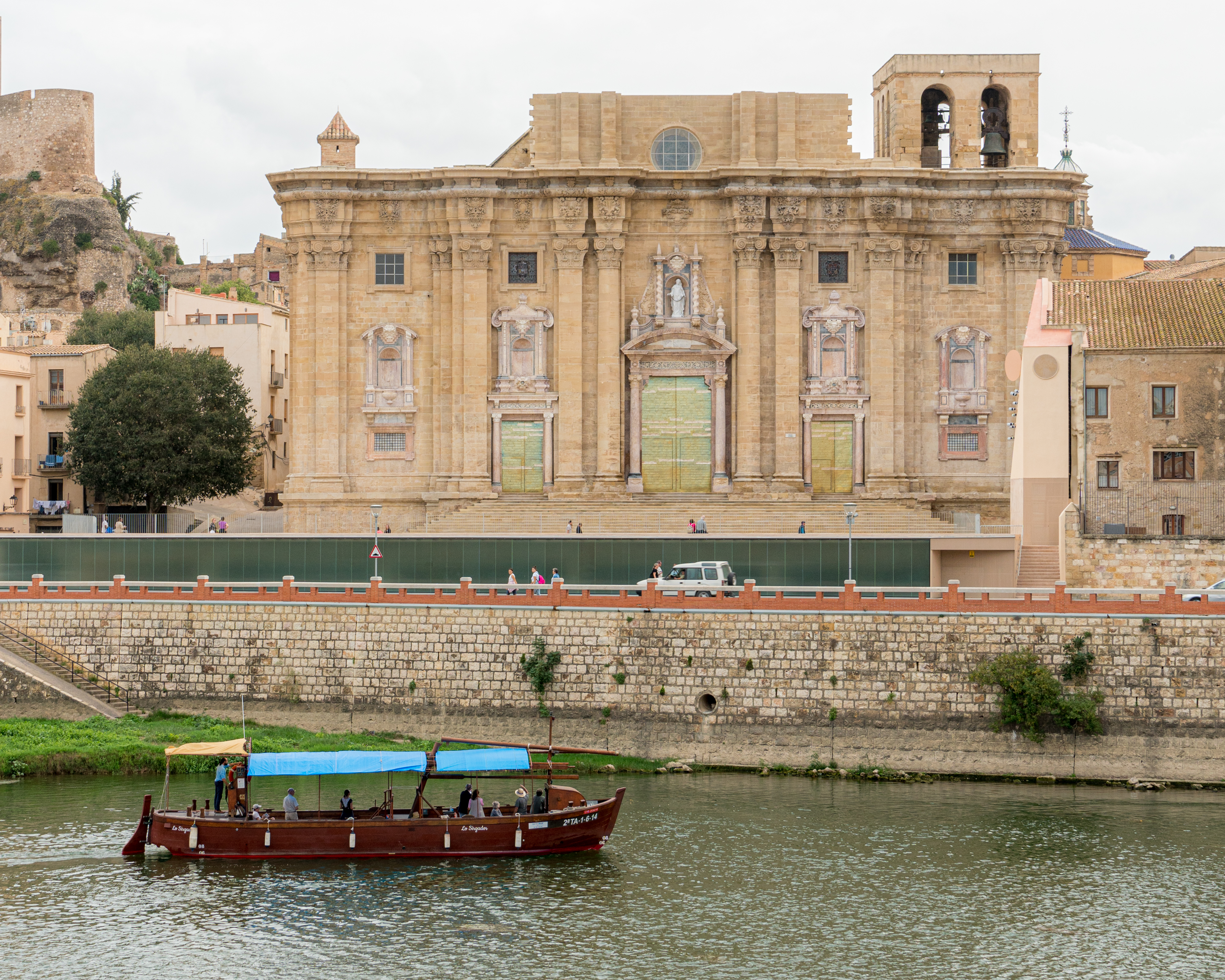
The cathedral in 2022

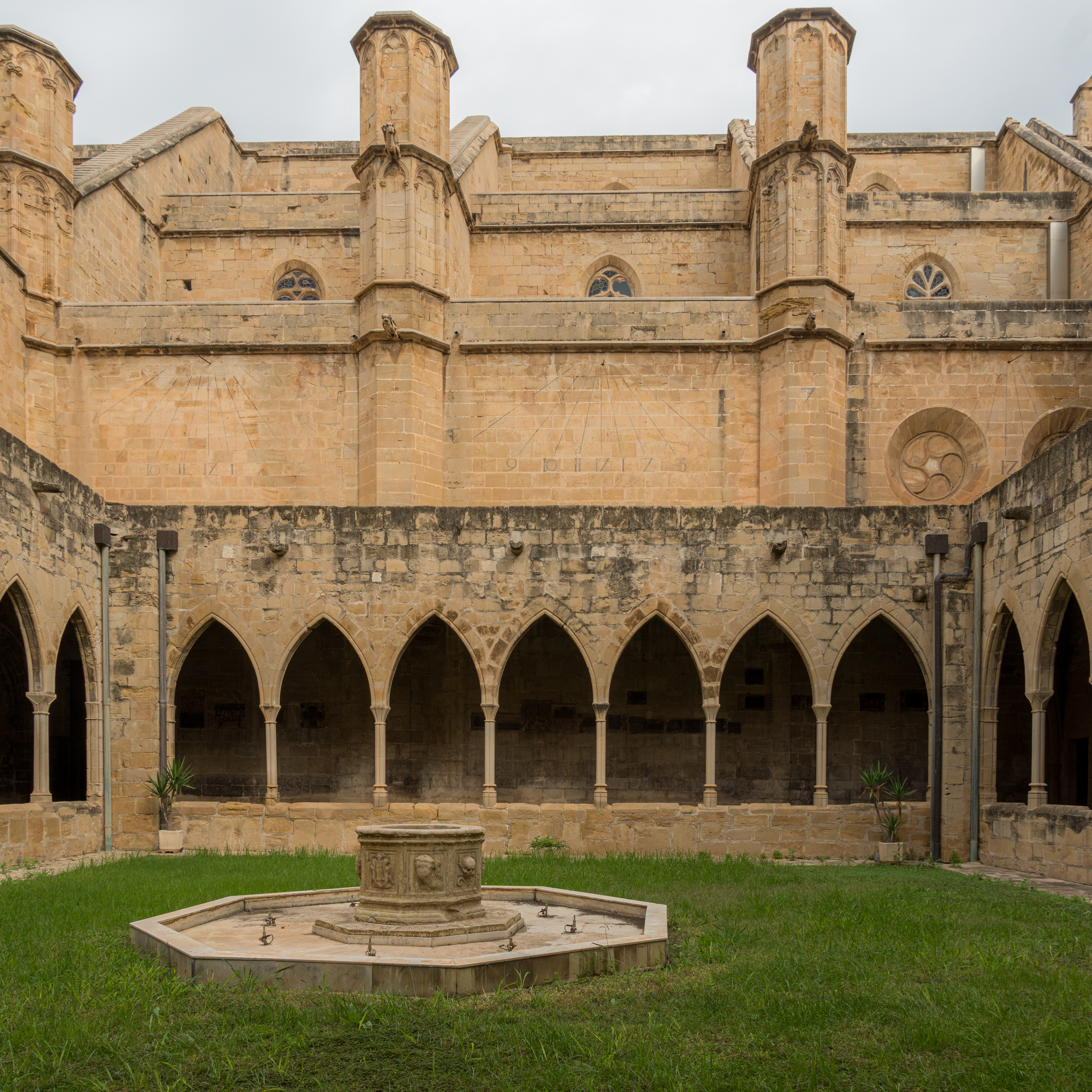
Cathedral cloister

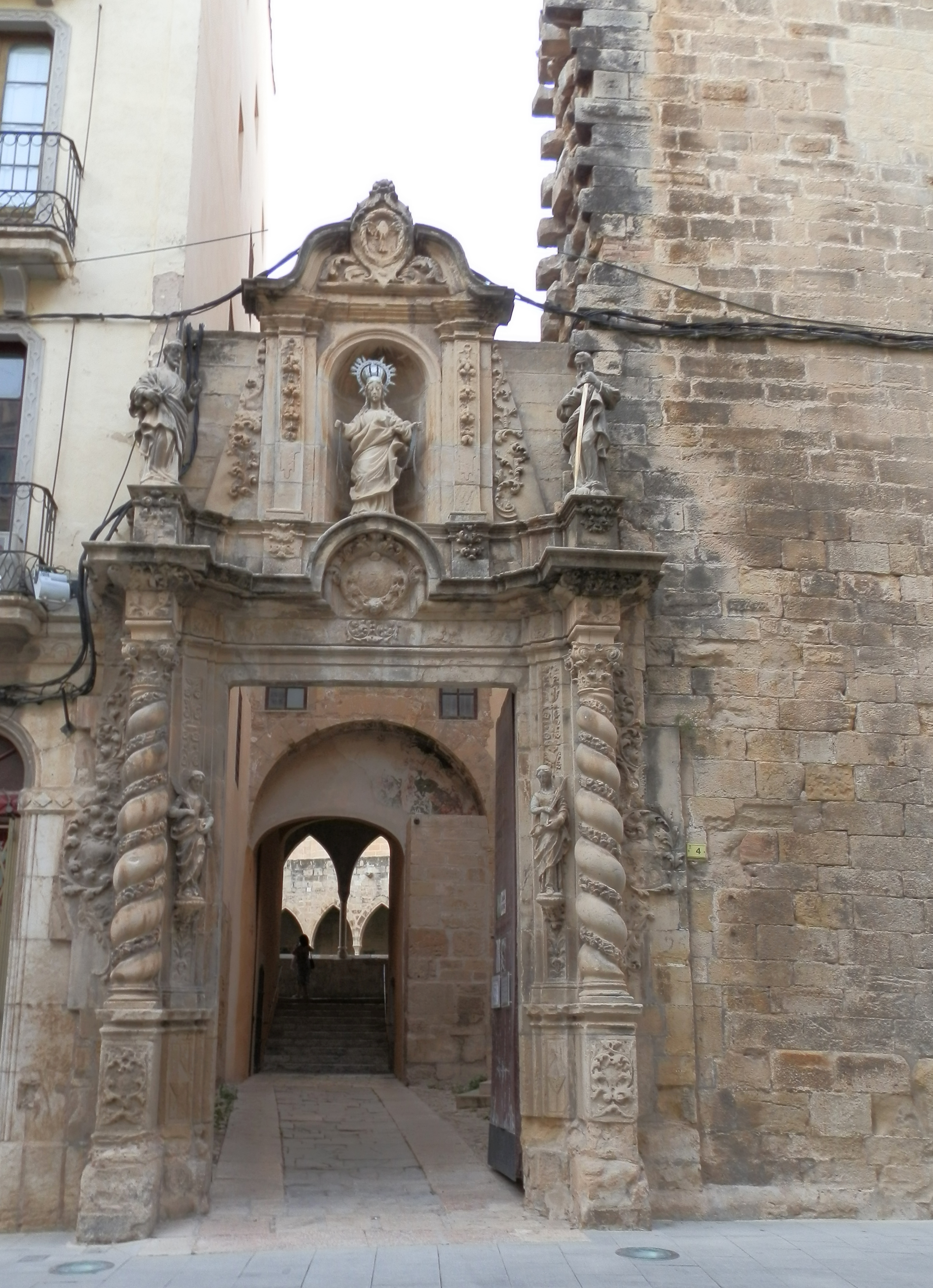
Baroque entryway to the cloister

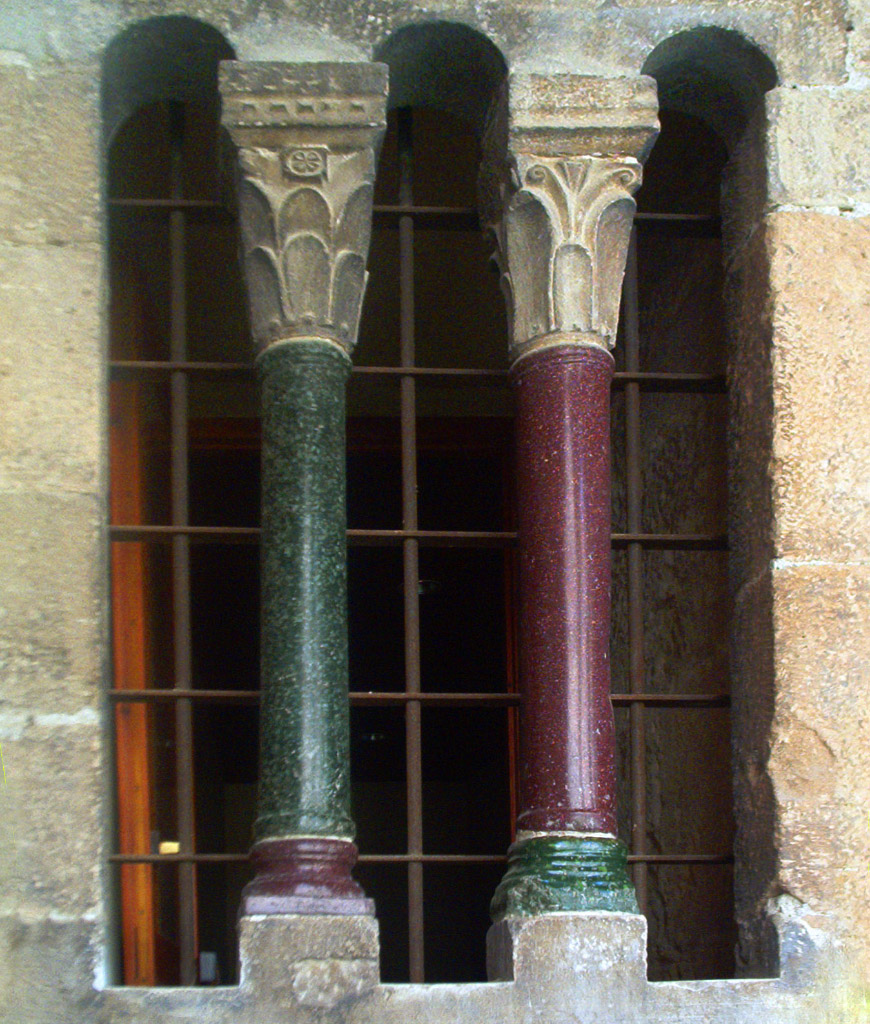
Window in the cloister

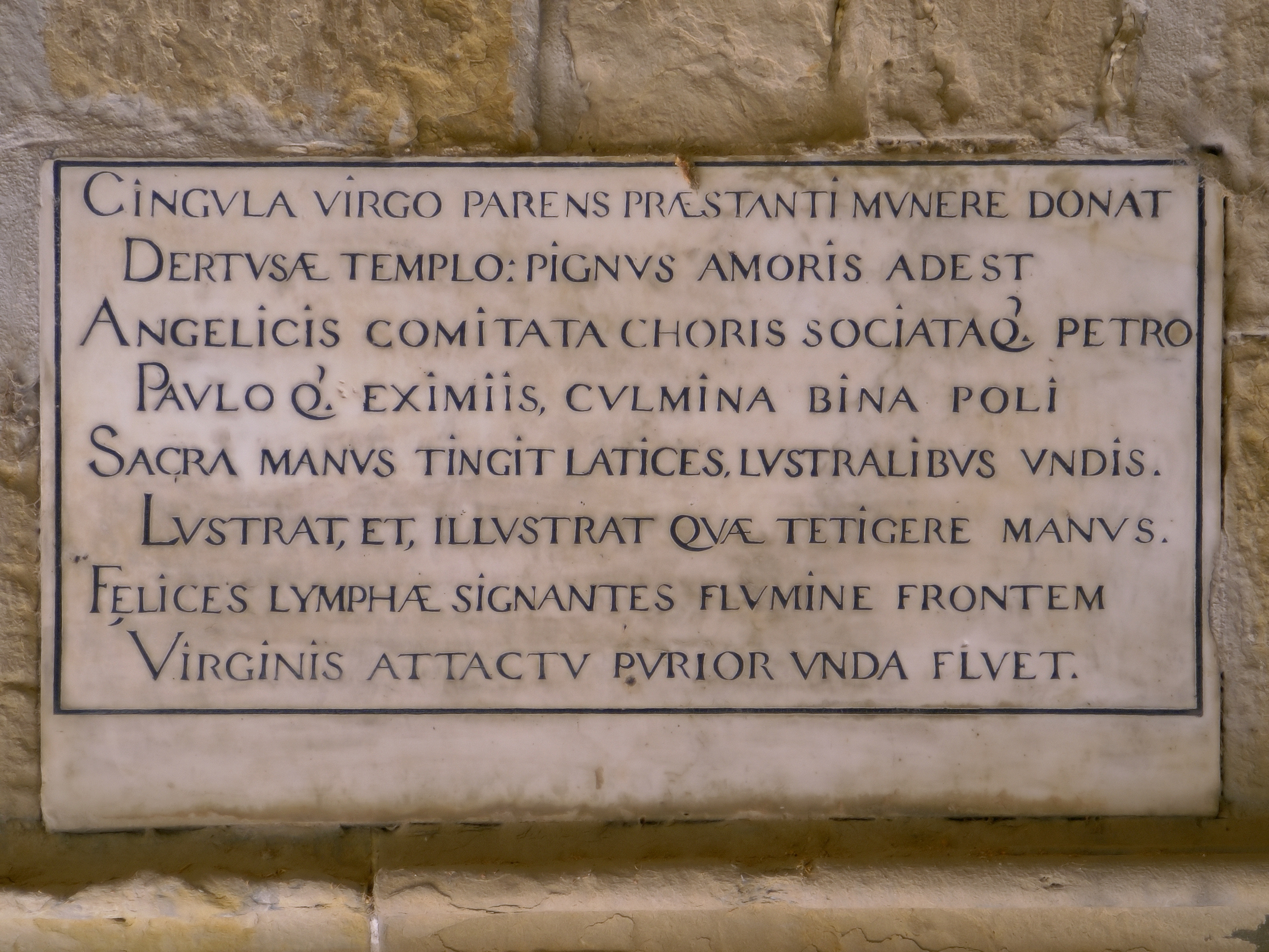
13th century plaque inside the cathedral

== History ==
The Cathedral was the location of the famous Disputations of Tortosa, where Jews were forced to defend their faith or convert. After two weeks of arguments, a Papal Bull was issued by the Antipope Benedict XIII that forbade the learning from the Talmud or any other Jewish book that attacked Christianity.
