= Calaceite =

Calaceite Calaceit
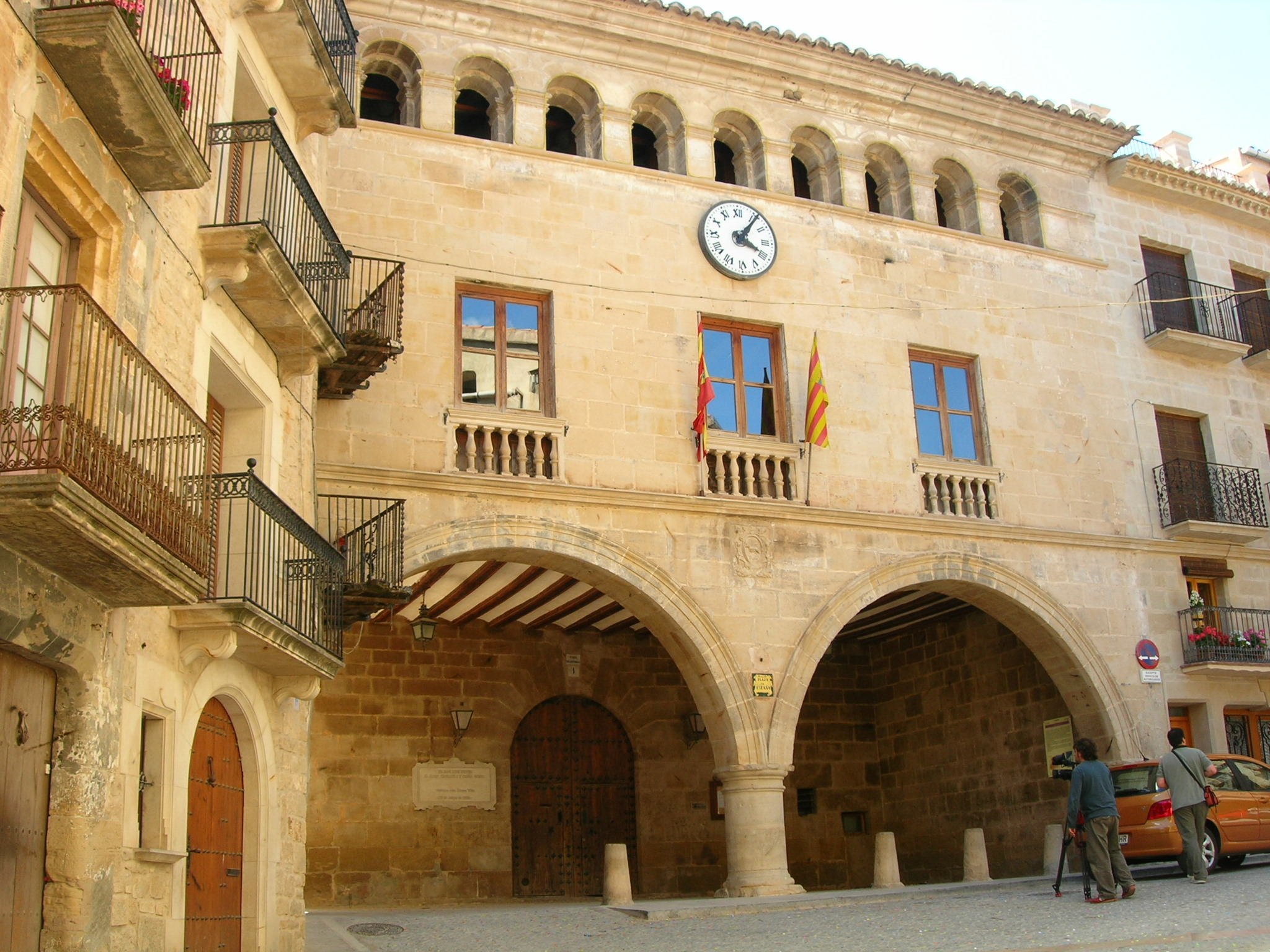
- Town hall

- Coat of arms

- Location of Calaceite/Calceit within Aragon Location of Calaceite/Calceit within Spain
- Coordinates: 41°1′N 0°12′E
- Country: Spain
- Autonomous community: Aragon
- Province: Teruel
- Municipality: Calaceite

Area
  - Total: 81 km^{2} (31 sq mi)
- Elevation: 511 m (1,677 ft)

Population (2025-01-01)
  - Total: 961
  - Density: 12/km^{2} (31/sq mi)
- Time zone: UTC+1 (CET)
  - Summer (DST): UTC+2 (CEST)

Calaceite (Spanish: [kalaˈθejte]) or Calaceit (Catalan: [kalaˈsejt]) is a municipality located in the Matarraña comarca, in the province of Teruel, Aragon, Spain. According to the 2004 census (INE), the municipality has a population of 1,145 inhabitants.

There are many ancient buildings of great architectural value in the town, as well as the ruins of an ancient Iberian village at San Antonio. This town is part of the Catalan-speaking area of Aragon.

== Demographics ==
Calaceite has 1,132 inhabitants (INE 2008).

Historical population
Year	Pop.	±%
1900	2,641	—
1920	3,027	+14.6%
1940	1,930	−36.2%
1960	1,742	−9.7%
1981	1,432	−17.8%
2000	1,193	−16.7%
2006	1,143	−4.2%
Source: INE (Spain)

== Gastronomy ==
The flaonets de Calaceit (flaonets, Catalan: little flaons) are small flaons made in Calaceite. They are small pastries filled with pumpkin jam and honey. The flaonets were one of the traditional pastries fondly remembered by painter Salvador Dalí.

== Gallery ==
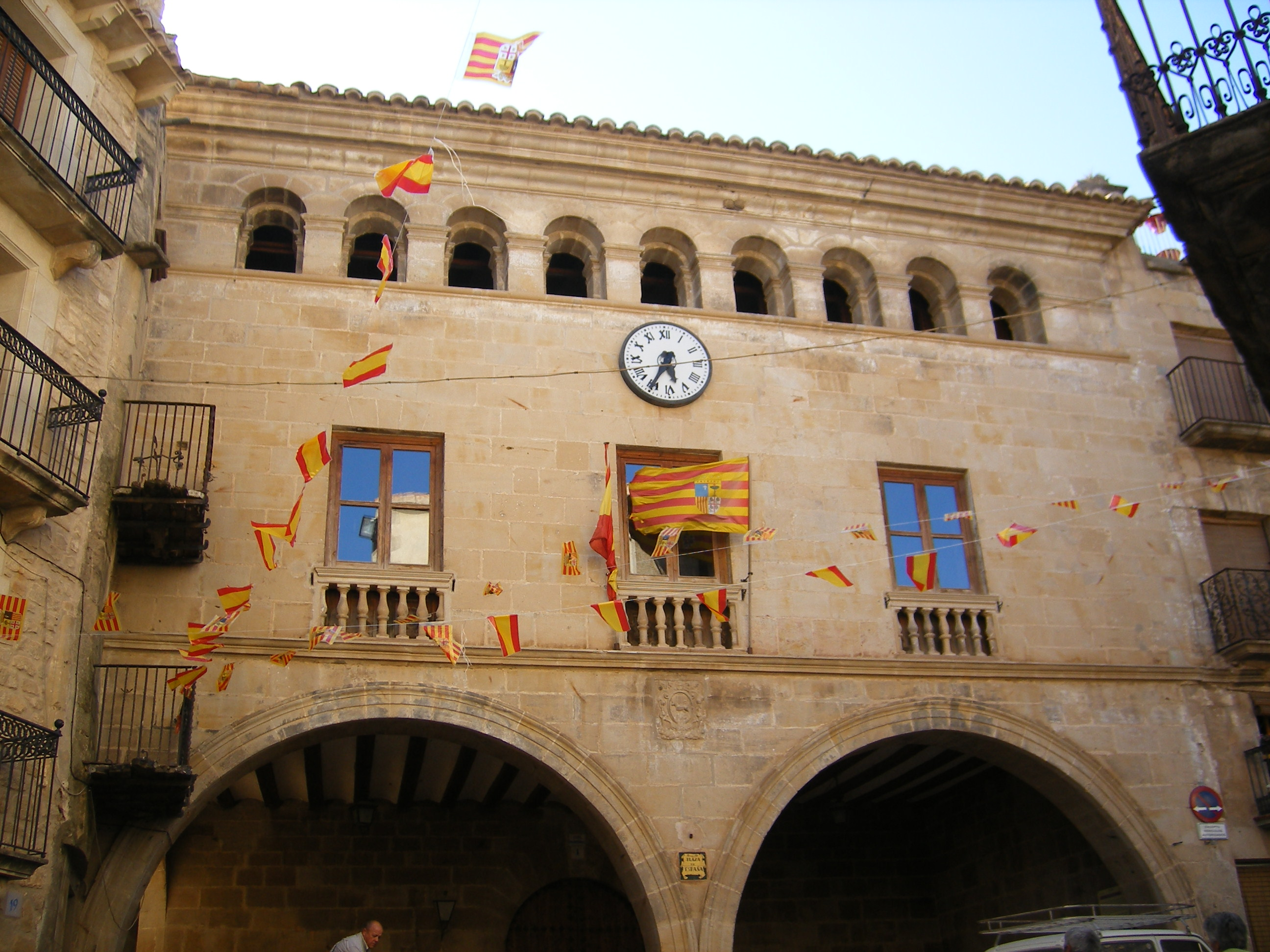
Town Hall of Calaceite

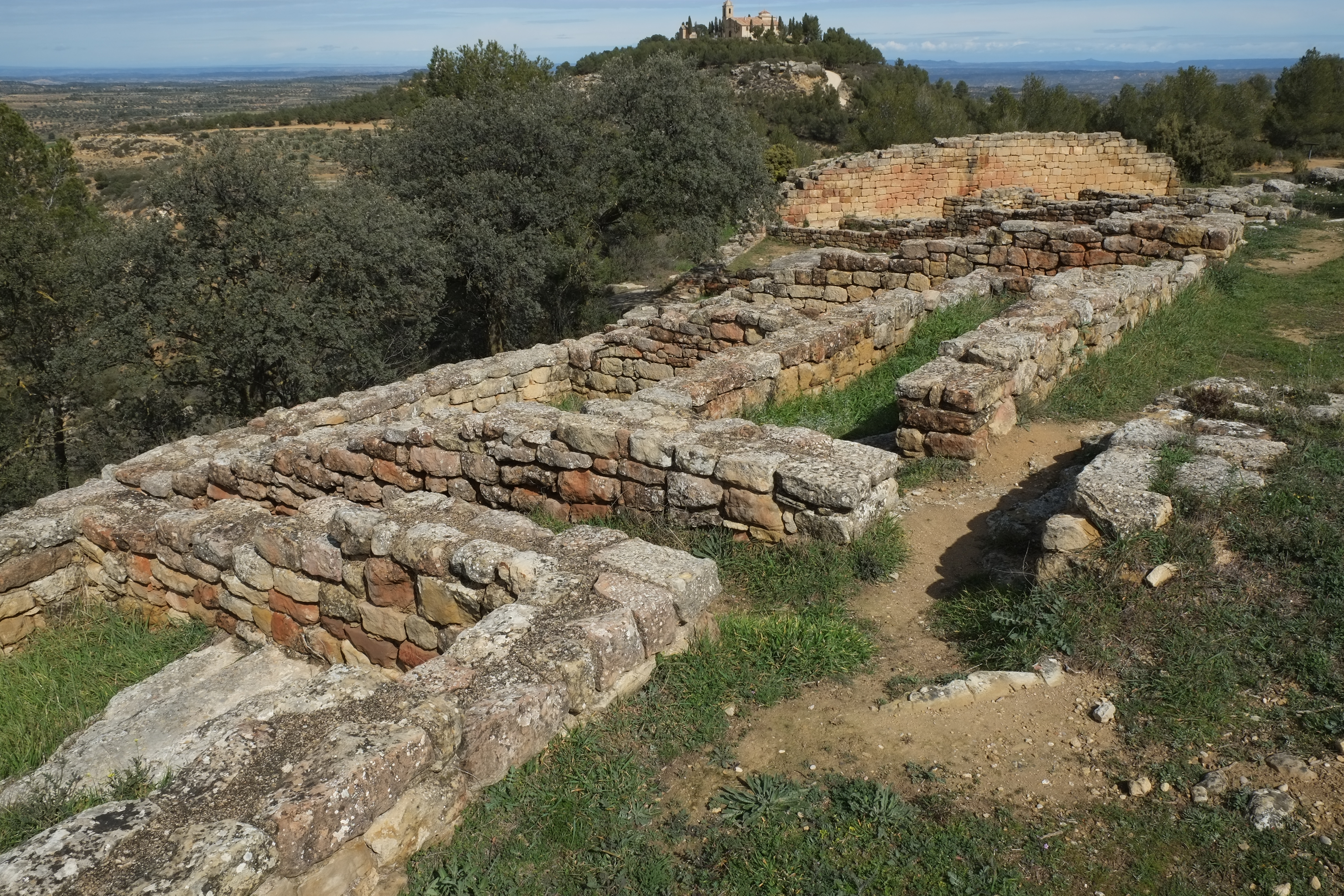
San Antonio Ilercavones Iberian village

== See also ==
- List of municipalities in Teruel
