= Arens de Lledó =

Arens de Lledó/Arenys de Lledó
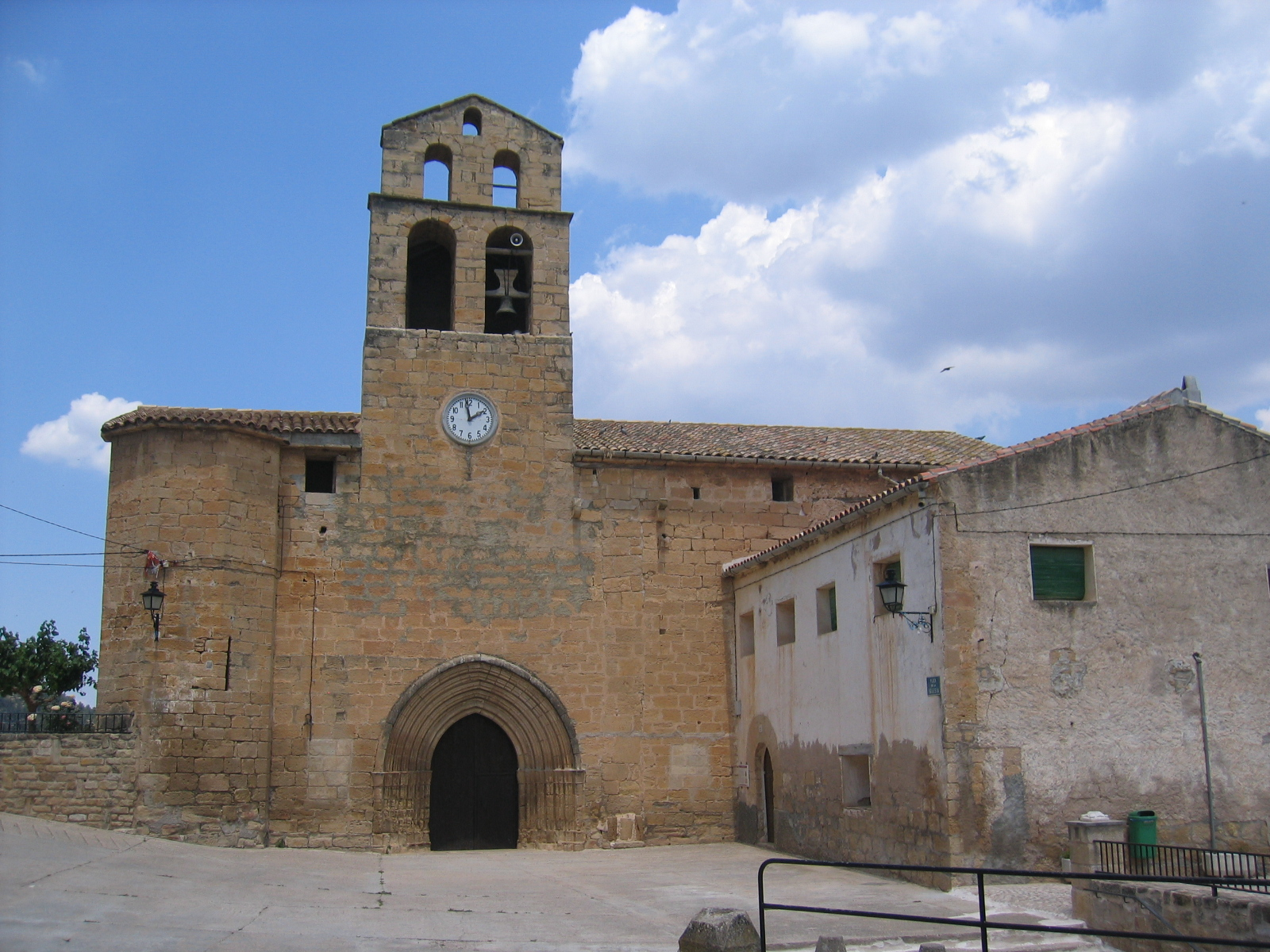

- Location of Arens de Lledó/Arenys de Lledó within Aragon Location of Arens de Lledó/Arenys de Lledó within Spain
- Coordinates: 40°59′N 0°16′E
- Country: Spain
- Autonomous community: Aragon
- Province: Teruel
- Municipality: Arens de Lledó/ Arenys de Lledó

Area
  - Total: 34.27 km^{2} (13.23 sq mi)

Population (2025-01-01)
  - Total: 181
  - Density: 5.28/km^{2} (13.7/sq mi)
- Time zone: UTC+1 (CET)
  - Summer (DST): UTC+2 (CEST)

Arens de Lledó (Spanish: [aˈɾens ðe ʎeˈðo]) or Arenys de Lledó (Catalan: [aˈɾeɲz ðe ʎeˈðo]) is a municipality located in the Matarraña/Matarranya comarca, province of Teruel, Aragon, Spain. According to the 2008 census (INE), the municipality has a population of 217 inhabitants, and covers an area of 34.27 square kilometres. It is situated in the Franja de Ponent.

== See also ==
- List of municipalities in Teruel
