= Monroyo =

Monroyo/Mont-roig de Tastavins
- municipality
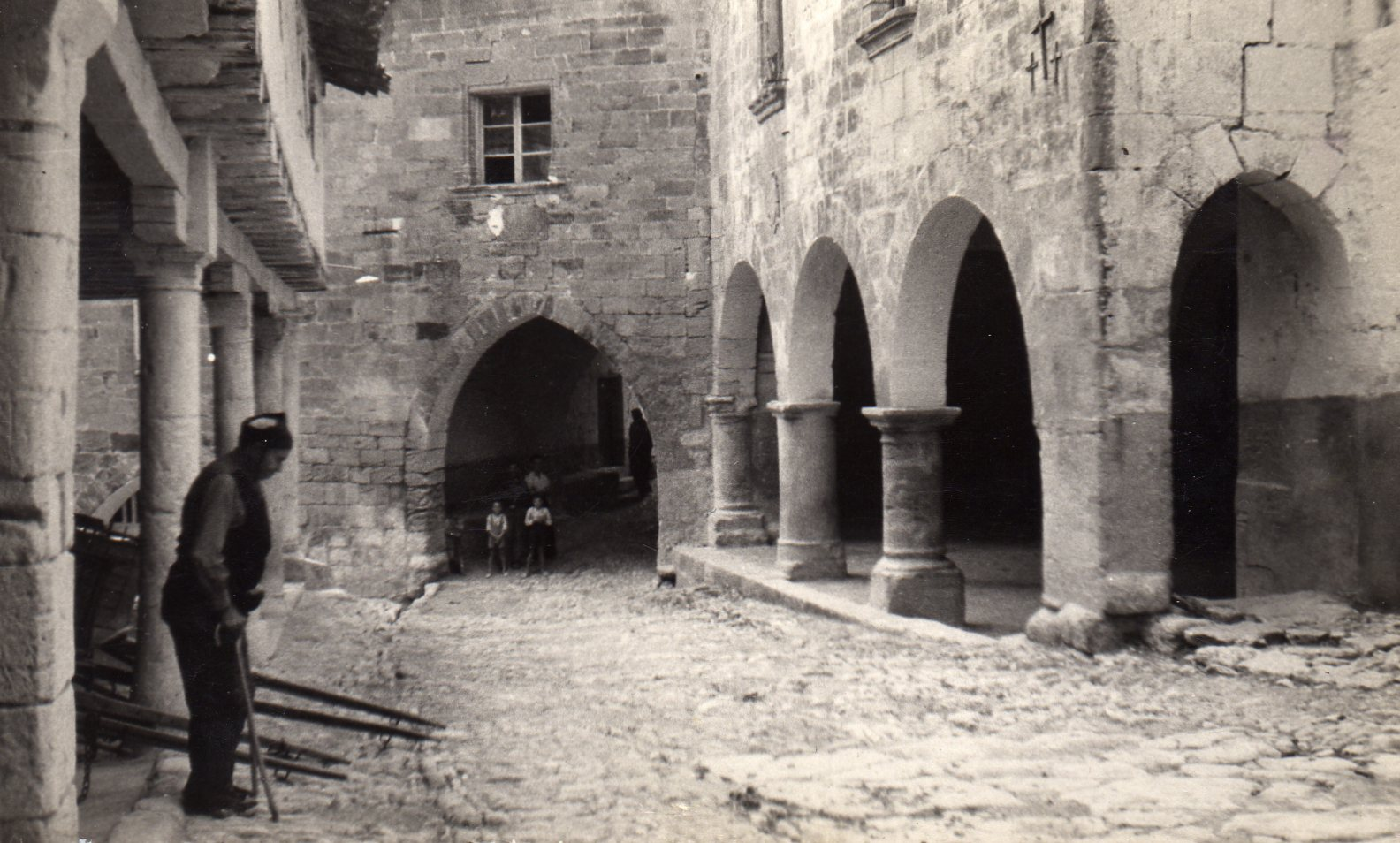

- Coat of arms

- Location of Monroyo/Mont-roig de Tastavins within Aragon Location of Monroyo/Mont-roig de Tastavins within Spain
- Coordinates: 40°47′N 0°2′W
- Country: Spain
- Autonomous community: Aragon
- Province: Teruel
- Municipality: Monroyo/ Mont-roig de Tastavins

Area
  - Total: 79.20 km^{2} (30.58 sq mi)
- Elevation: 857 m (2,812 ft)

Population (2025-01-01)
  - Total: 324
  - Density: 4.09/km^{2} (10.6/sq mi)
- Time zone: UTC+1 (CET)
  - Summer (DST): UTC+2 (CEST)

Monroyo (Spanish: [monˈroʝo]) or Mont-roig de Tastavins (Catalan: [monˈrɔdʒ ðe ˌtastaˈβins]) is a municipality located in the Matarraña/Matarranya comarca, province of Teruel, Aragon, Spain. According to the 2004 census (INE), the municipality has a population of 324 inhabitants.

== See also ==
- Matarraña/Matarranya
- List of municipalities in Teruel
