= Cretas =

Cretas/Cretes
- municipality
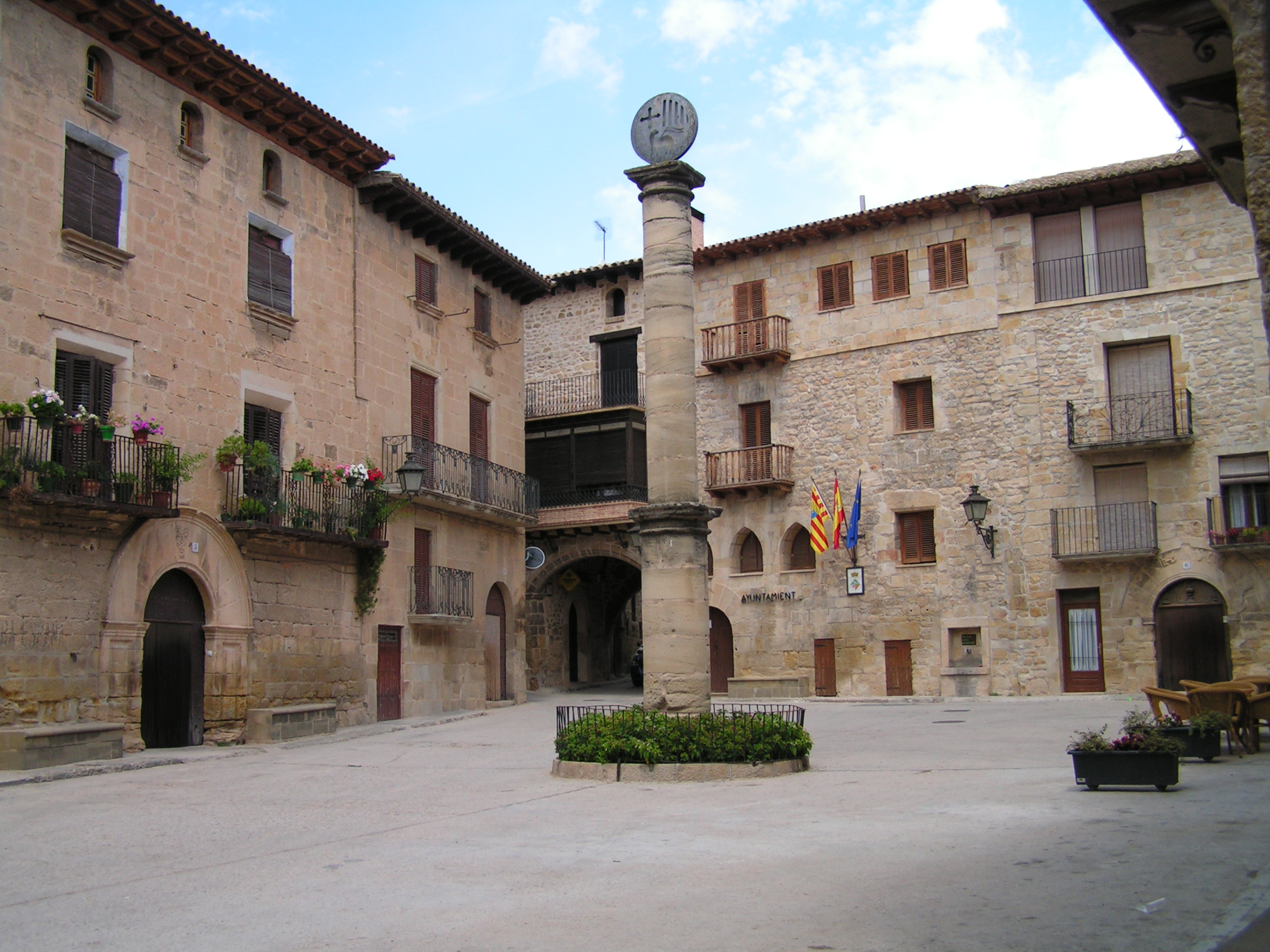

- Flag Coat of arms

- Location of Cretas/Cretes within Aragon Location of Cretas/Cretes within Spain
- Coordinates: 40°56′N 0°13′E
- Country: Spain
- Autonomous community: Aragon
- Province: Teruel

Area
  - Total: 52 km^{2} (20 sq mi)

Population (2025-01-01)
  - Total: 559
  - Density: 11/km^{2} (28/sq mi)
- Time zone: UTC+1 (CET)
  - Summer (DST): UTC+2 (CEST)

Cretas (Spanish: [ˈkɾetas]) or Cretes (Catalan: [ˈkɾetes], also known as Queretes) is a municipality located in the Matarraña/Matarranya comarca, province of Teruel, Aragon, Spain. According to the 2004 census (INE), the municipality has a population of 588 inhabitants. It belongs to the Catalan-speaking strip in eastern Aragon known as La Franja.

== See also ==
- Matarraña/Matarranya
- List of municipalities in Teruel
