= Ráfales =

Ráfales/Ràfels
- municipality
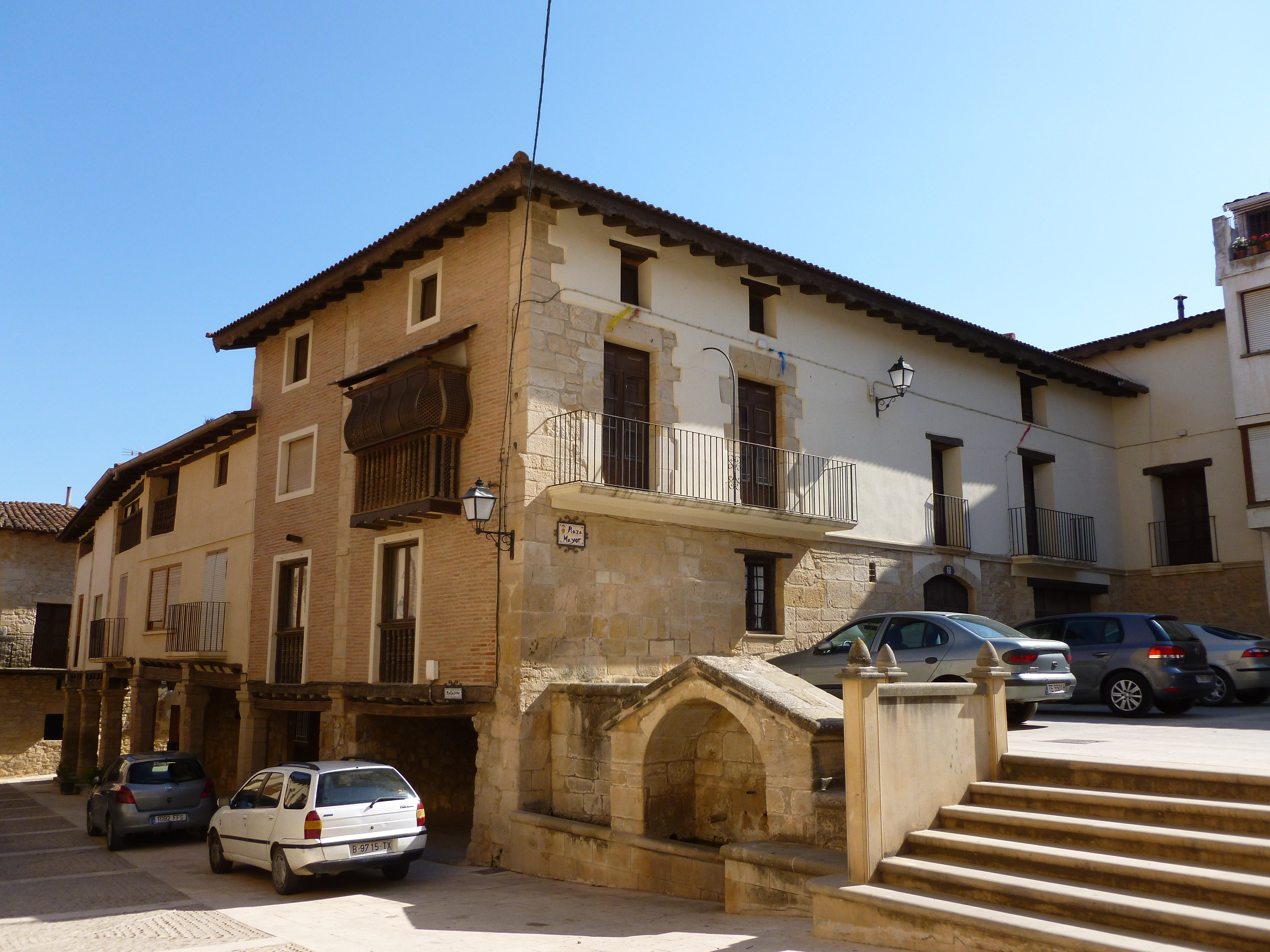

- Flag Coat of arms

- Location of Ráfales/Ràfels within Aragon Location of Ráfales/Ràfels within Spain
- Coordinates: 40°50′N 0°1′E
- Country: Spain
- Autonomous community: Aragon
- Province: Teruel
- Municipality: Ráfales/Ràfels

Area
  - Total: 35 km^{2} (14 sq mi)

Population (2025-01-01)
  - Total: 149
  - Density: 4.3/km^{2} (11/sq mi)
- Time zone: UTC+1 (CET)
  - Summer (DST): UTC+2 (CEST)

Ráfales (Spanish: [ˈrafales]) or Ràfels (Catalan: [ˈrafels]) is a municipality located in the Matarraña/Matarranya comarca, province of Teruel, Aragon, Spain. According to the 2004 census (INE), the municipality has a population of 181 inhabitants.

== See also ==
- List of municipalities in Teruel
