= Lledó =

Lledó/Lledó d'Algars
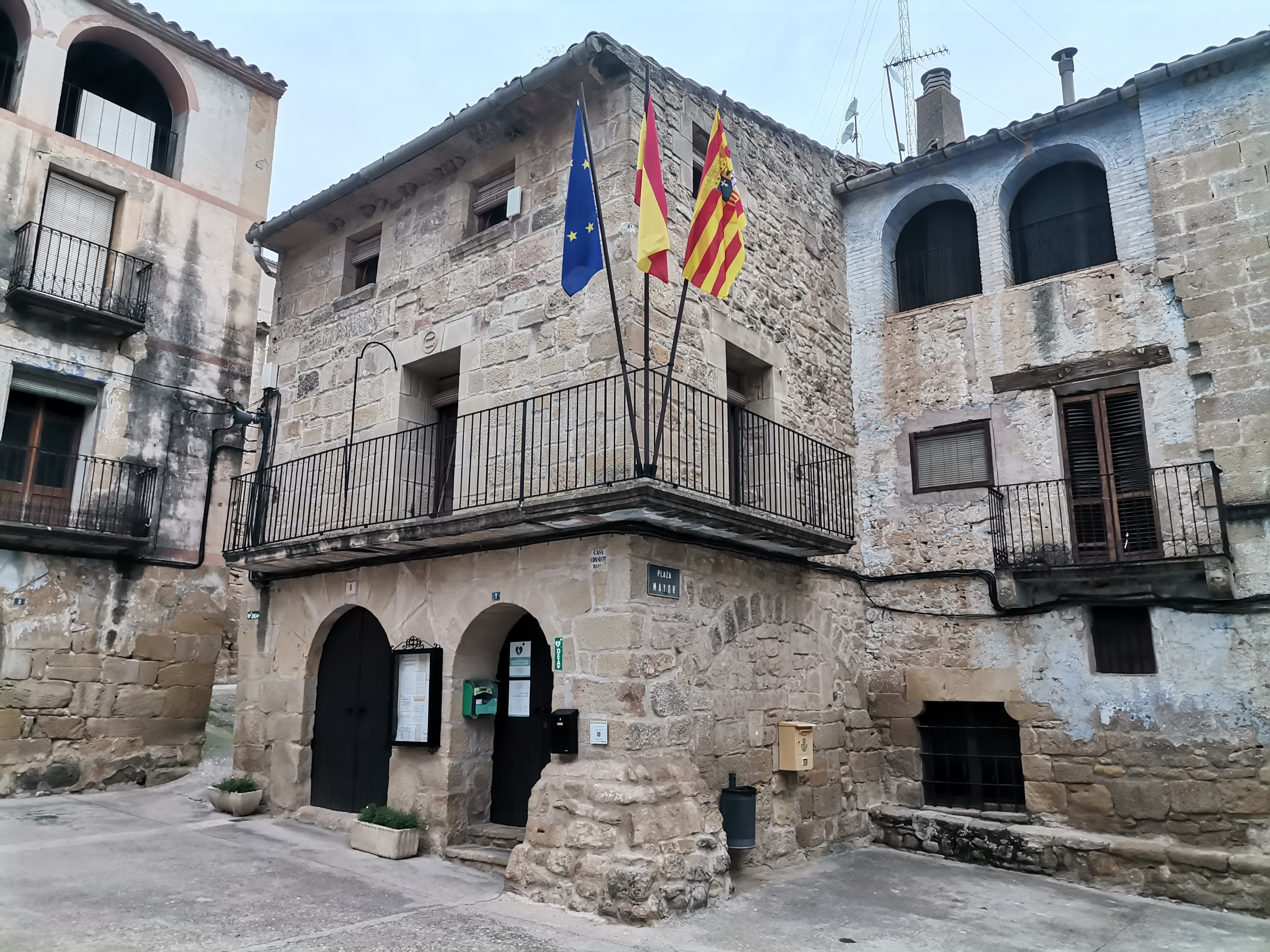
- Town hall

- Location of Lledó/Lledó d'Algars within Aragon Location of Lledó/Lledó d'Algars within Spain
- Coordinates: 40°57′N 0°18′E
- Country: Spain
- Autonomous community: Aragon
- Province: Teruel
- Municipality: Lledó

Area
  - Total: 15.82 km^{2} (6.11 sq mi)
- Elevation: 458 m (1,503 ft)

Population (2025-01-01)
  - Total: 150
  - Density: 9.5/km^{2} (25/sq mi)
- Time zone: UTC+1 (CET)
  - Summer (DST): UTC+2 (CEST)

Lledó (Spanish: [ʎeˈðo] or Lledó d'Algars (Catalan: [ʎeˈðo ðalˈɣas]) is a municipality located in the Matarraña/Matarranya comarca, province of Teruel, Aragon, Spain. According to the 2004 census (INE), the municipality has a population of 191 inhabitants.

== See also ==
- List of municipalities in Teruel
