= Valderrobres =

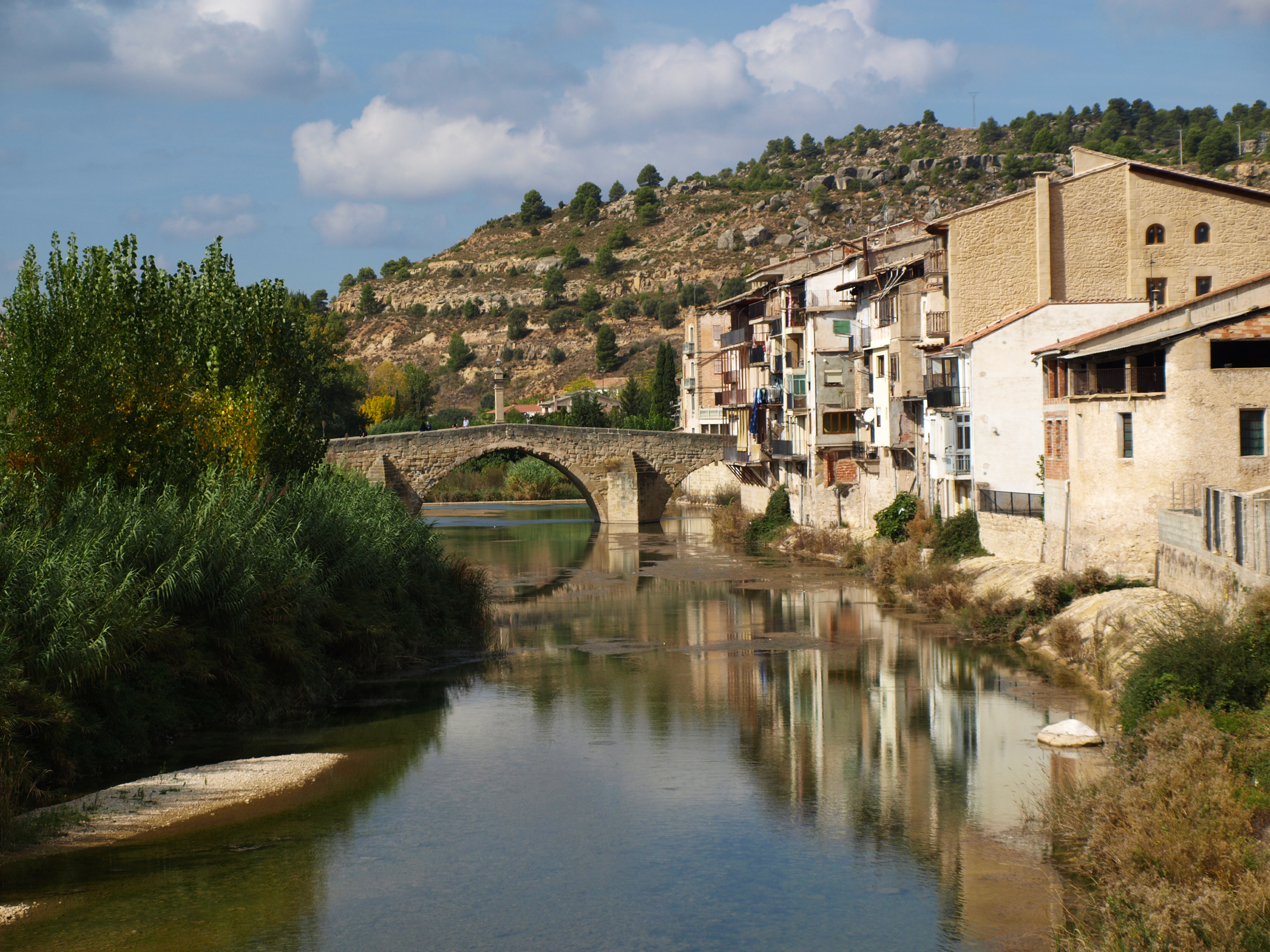

- Coat of arms

- Location of Valderrobres within Aragon Location of Valderrobres within Spain
- Coordinates: 40°53′N 0°9′E
- Country: Spain
- Autonomous community: Aragon
- Province: Teruel
- Municipality: Valderrobres

Area
  - Total: 124.04 km^{2} (47.89 sq mi)
- Elevation: 508 m (1,667 ft)

Population (2025-01-01)
  - Total: 2,555
- Time zone: UTC+1 (CET)
  - Summer (DST): UTC+2 (CEST)

Valderrobres (Spanish: [baldeˈroβɾes]) or Vall-de-roures (Western Catalan: [ˈbaʎ de ˈrowɾes]) is a municipality and the major town of the comarca of Matarraña in the province of Teruel, Aragon (Spain). It is located in view of the landscape of the northwestern foothills of the Ports de Tortosa-Beseit, by the Matarranya River, a tributary to the right of the Ebro. Valderrobres is part of the Taula del Sénia free association of municipalities.

The town has a Gothic church of Santa Maria, a Gothic castle and a Renaissance townhall building. The soprano Elvira de Hidalgo was born in Valderrobres in 1891.

This town and the surrounding comarca are considered a part of La Franja and the local dialect is a western variant of Catalan close to Valencian. The name of the town means "Valley of the Oaks", referred to the presence of Portuguese oak (roure or robre in local Catalan). However, the main trees in the forests of this town are the Aleppo pine and the black pine, followed by the Evergreen oak.

== Photo gallery ==
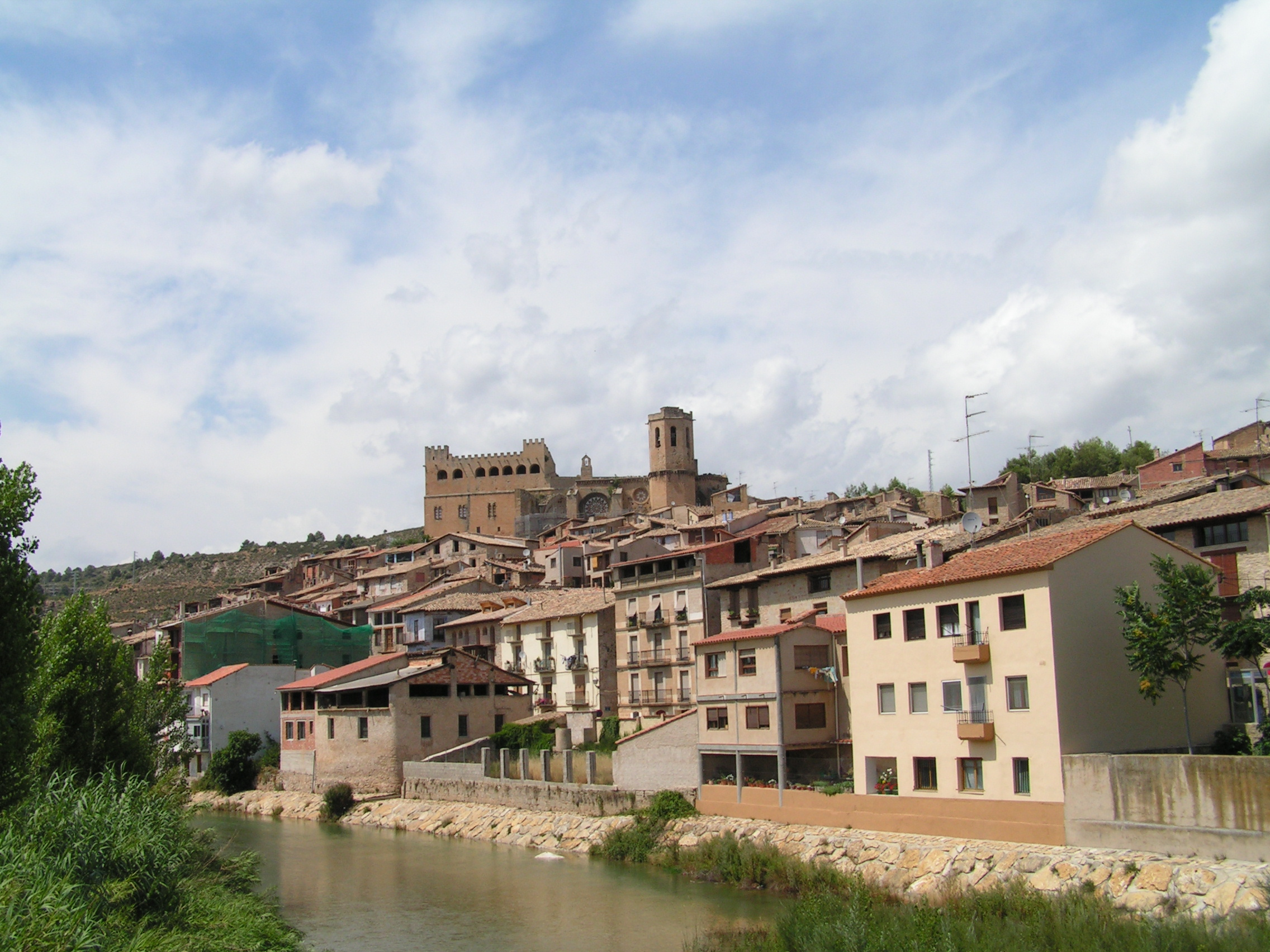
The Matarranya river flowing through the town

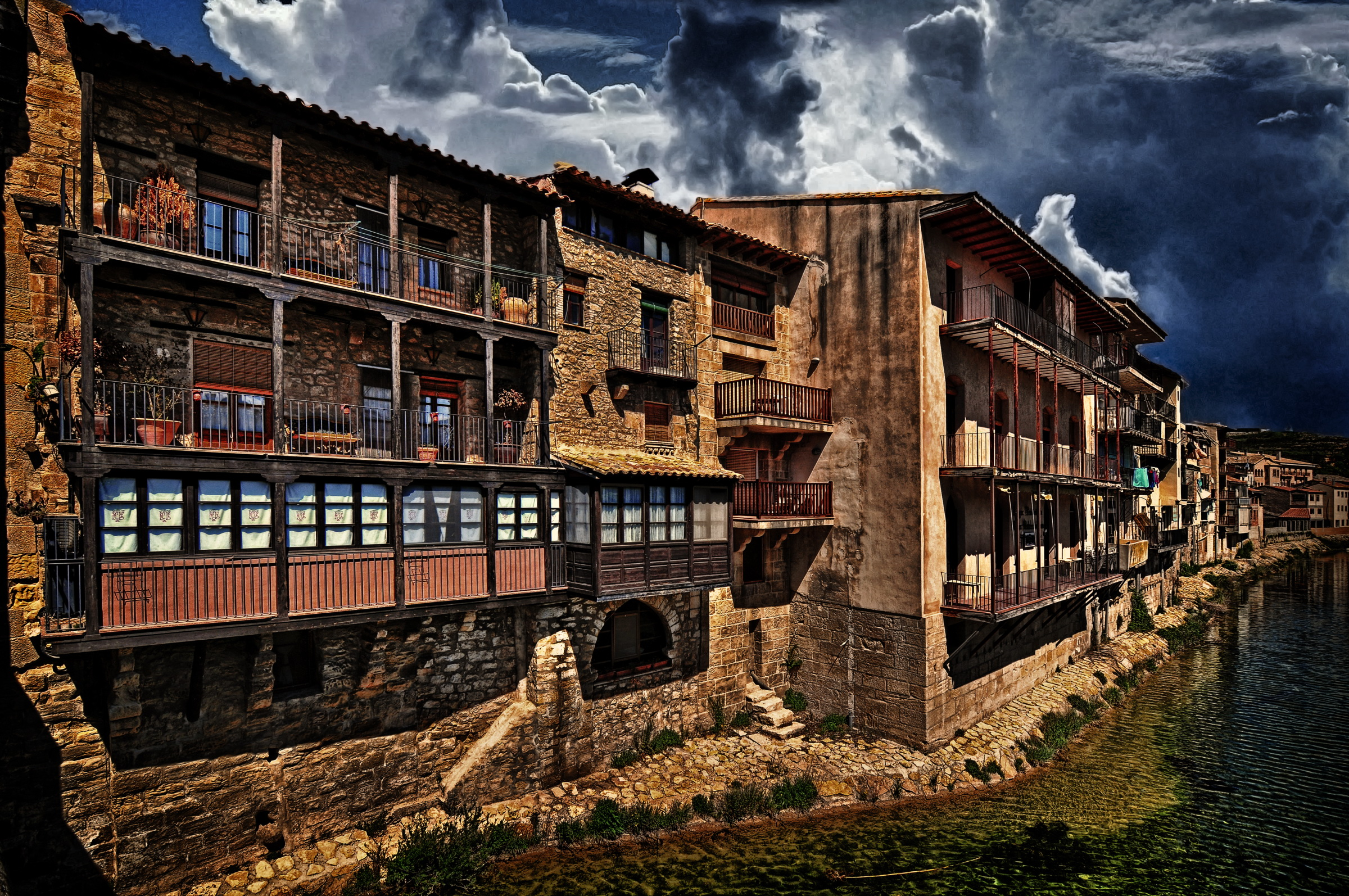

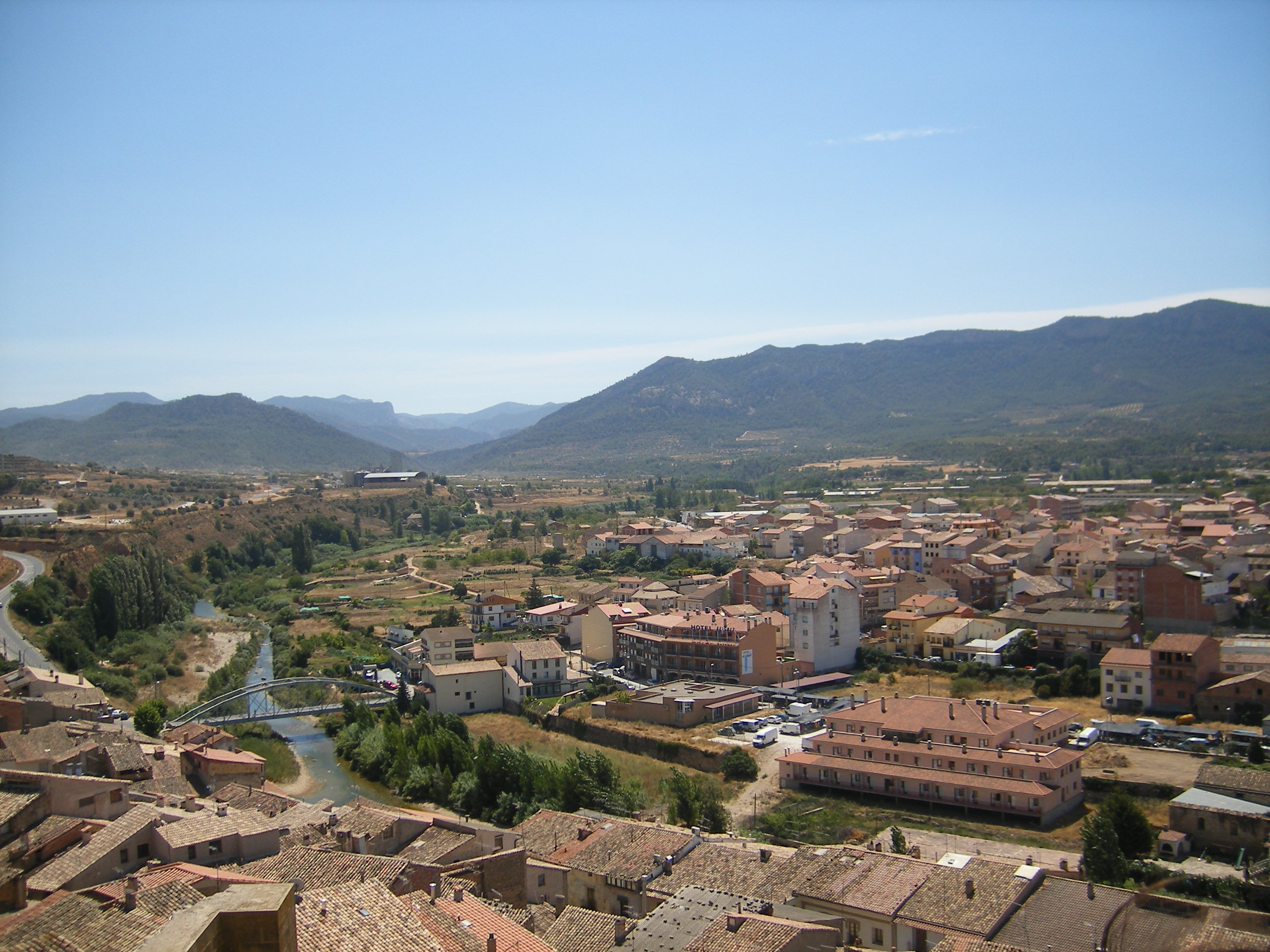

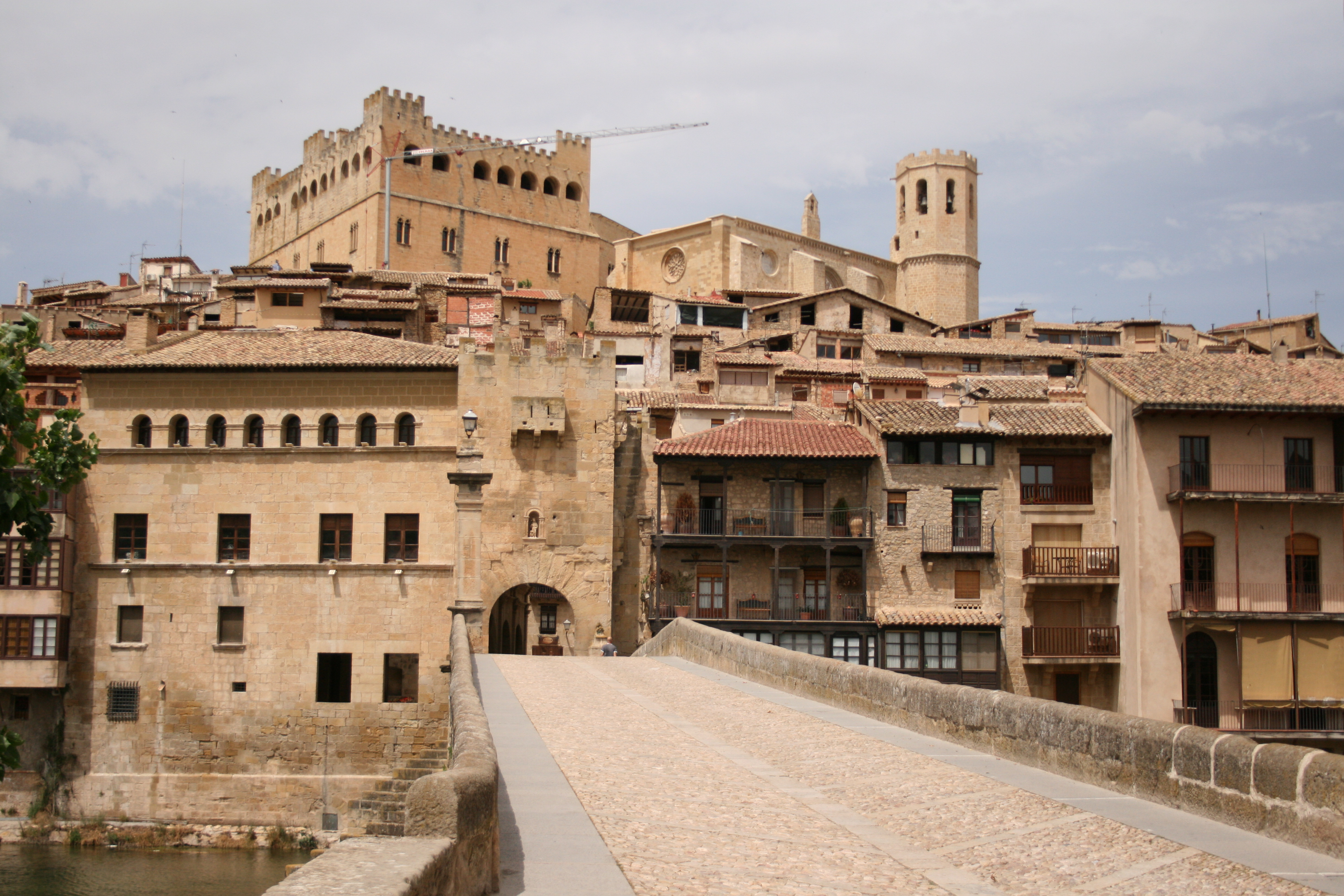

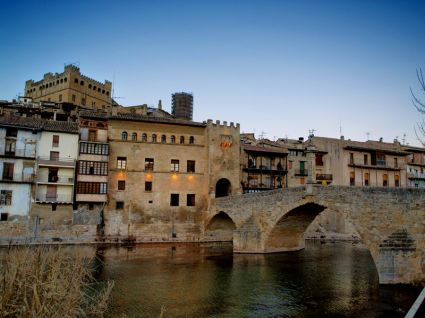

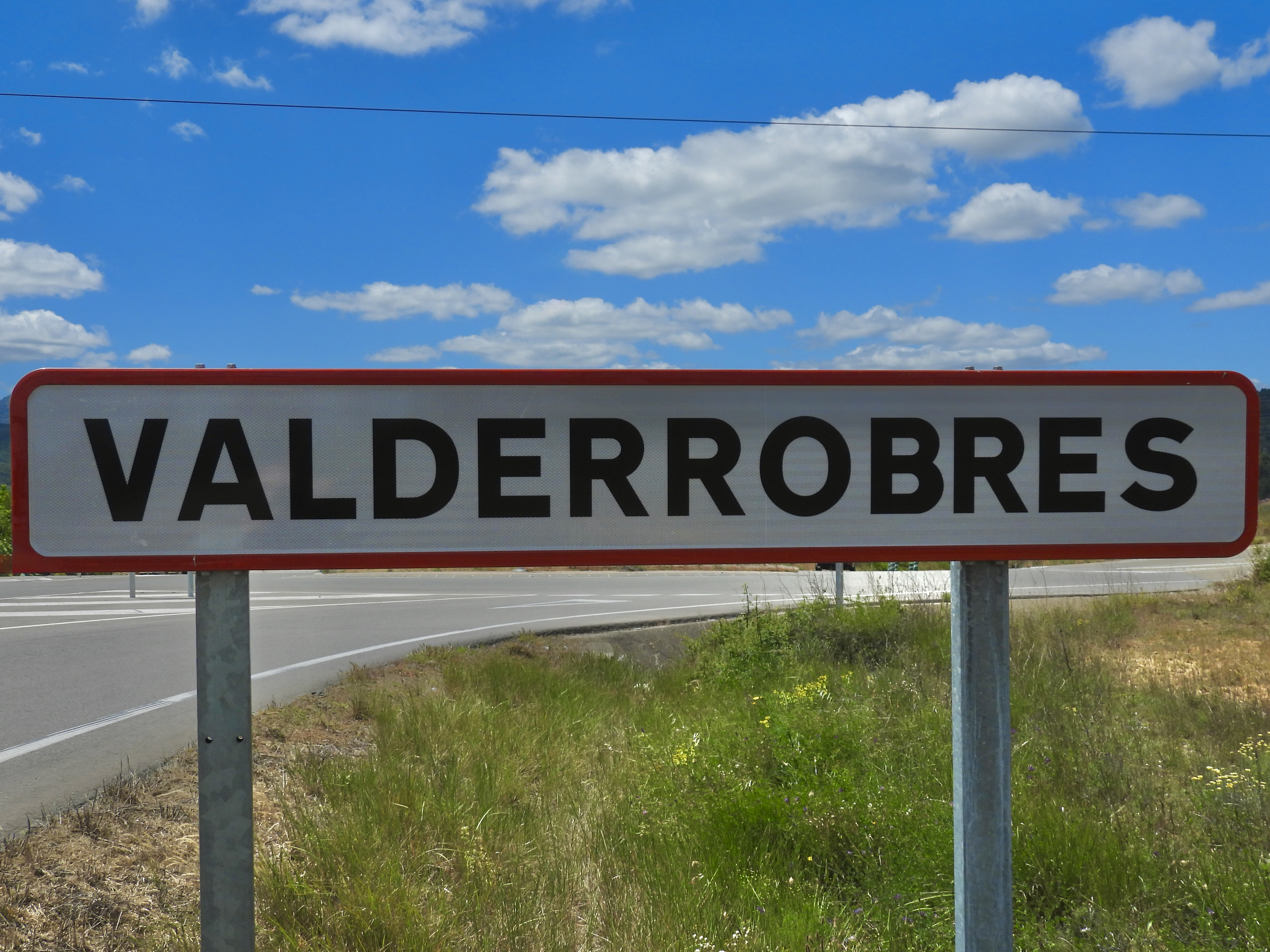
Valderrobres - City Limit Sign.

== See also ==
- Ports de Tortosa-Beseit
- List of municipalities in Teruel
