= Fórnoles =

Fórnoles/Fórnols de Matarranya
- municipality
- Location of Fórnoles/Fórnols de Matarranya within Aragon Location of Fórnoles/Fórnols de Matarranya within Spain
- Coordinates: 40°54′N 0°0′E
- Country: Spain
- Autonomous community: Aragon
- Province: Teruel

Area
  - Total: 32 km^{2} (12 sq mi)

Population (2025-01-01)
  - Total: 71
  - Density: 2.2/km^{2} (5.7/sq mi)
- Time zone: UTC+1 (CET)
  - Summer (DST): UTC+2 (CEST)

Fórnoles (Spanish: [ˈfoɾnoles]) or Fórnols de Matarranya (Catalan: [ˈfoɾnolz ðe mataˈraɲa]) is a municipality located in the Matarraña/Matarranya comarca, province of Teruel, Aragon, Spain. According to the 2004 census (INE), the municipality has a population of 103 inhabitants.

== See also ==
- List of municipalities in Teruel
