= La Fresneda =

La Fresneda La Freixneda
- Municipality
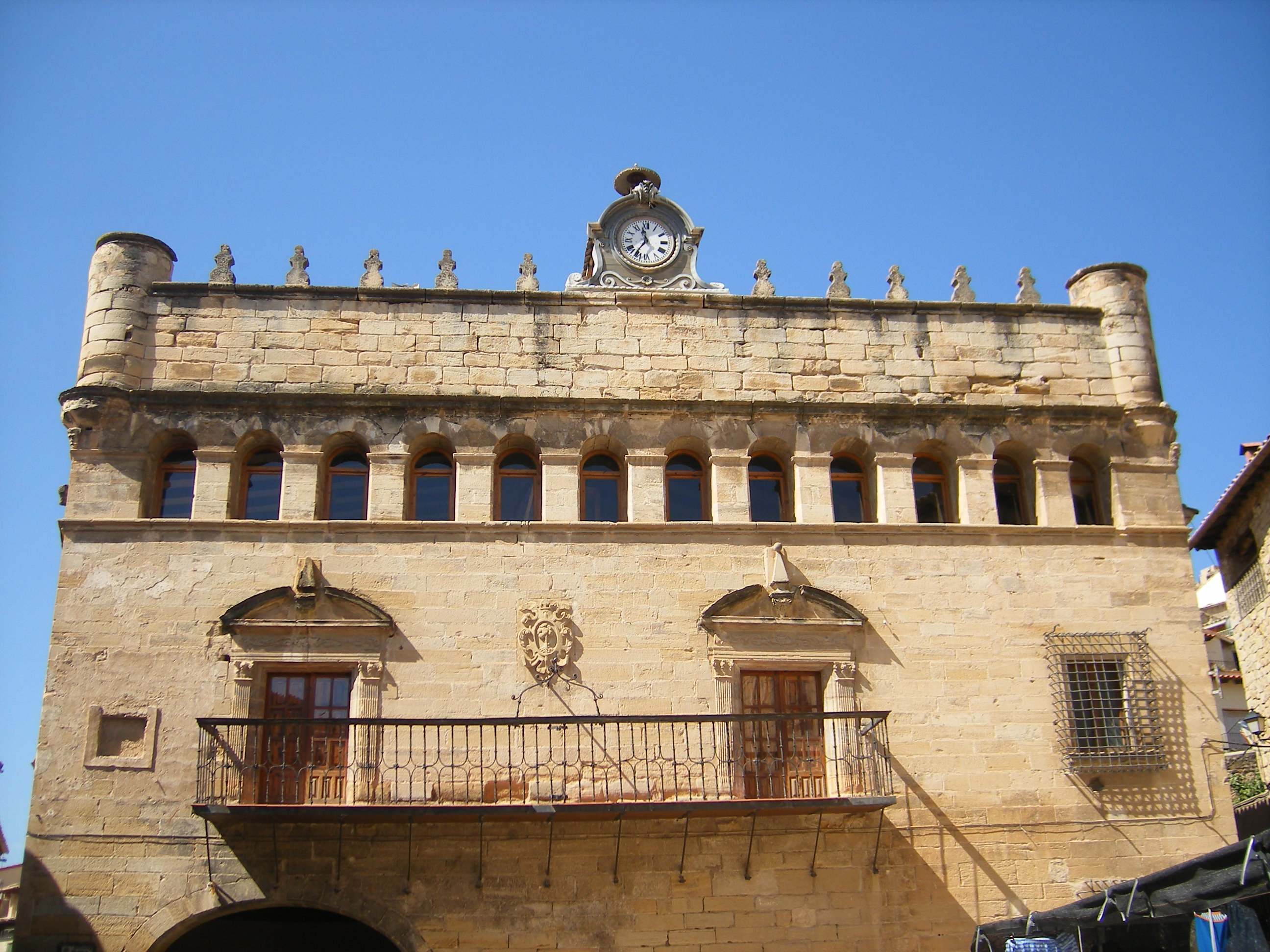
- town hall

- Coat of arms

- Location of La Fresneda/La Freixneda within Aragon Location of La Fresneda/La Freixneda within Spain
- Coordinates: 40°55′40.8″N 0°4′30″E
- Country: Spain
- Autonomous community: Aragon
- Province: Teruel
- Comarca: Matarraña

Area
  - Total: 39.49 km^{2} (15.25 sq mi)

Population (2025-01-01)
  - Total: 459
  - Density: 11.6/km^{2} (30.1/sq mi)
- Time zone: UTC+1 (CET)
  - Summer (DST): UTC+2 (CEST)

La Fresneda (Spanish: [la fɾesˈneða]) or La Freixneda (Catalan: [la fɾeʒˈneða]) is a municipality located in the Matarraña/Matarranya comarca, province of Teruel, Aragon, Spain. According to the 2004 census (INE), the municipality has a population of 451 inhabitants.

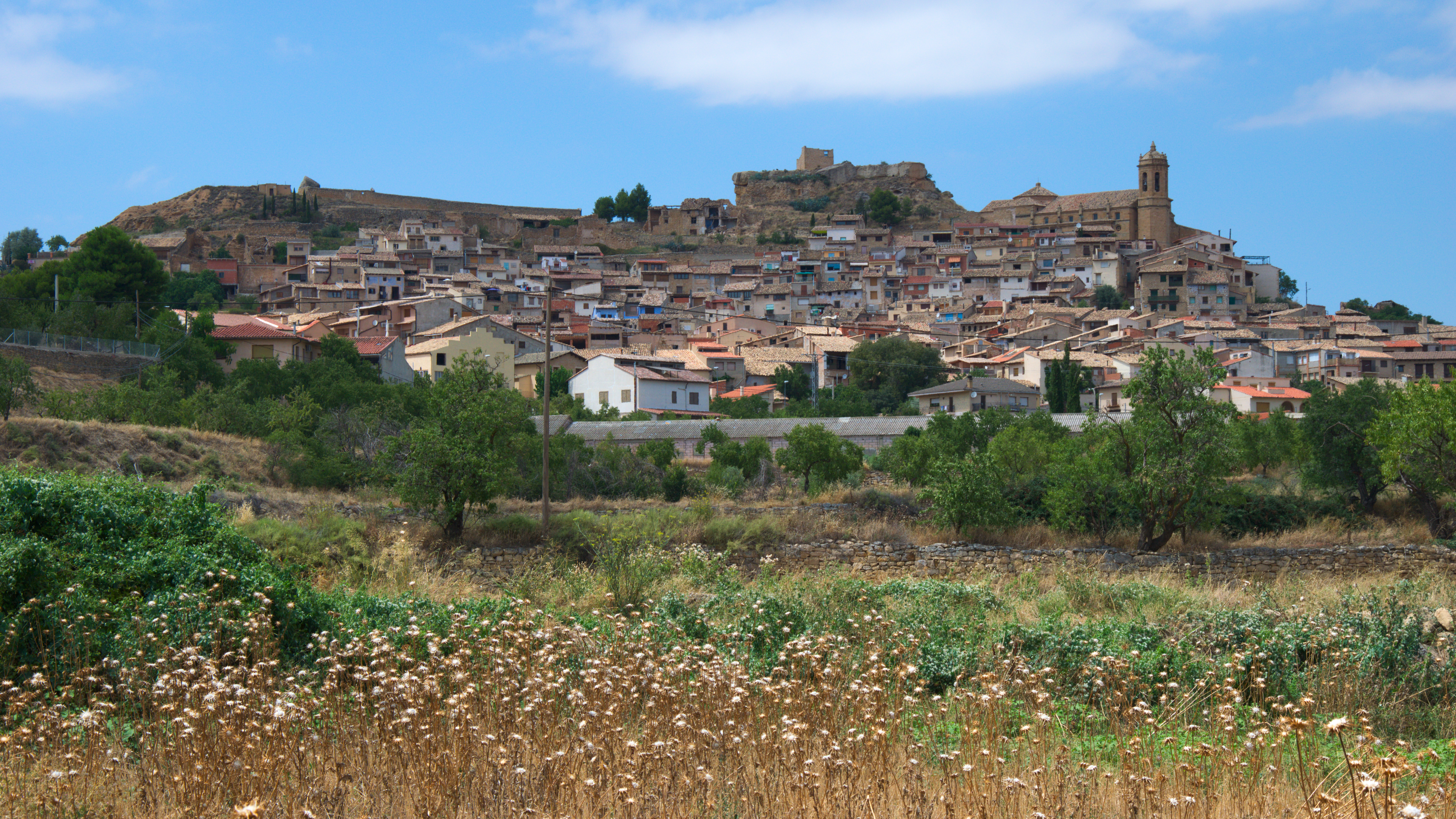
Municipality of Fresneda in the autonomous community of Aragon in Spain

== See also ==
- List of municipalities in Teruel
