= Mas de las Matas =

- municipality
- Coat of arms

- Location within Spain
- Coordinates: 40°50′N 0°15′W
- Country: Spain
- Autonomous community: Aragon
- Province: Teruel
- Comarca: Bajo Aragón

Area
  - Total: 30 km^{2} (12 sq mi)
- Elevation: 496 m (1,627 ft)

Population (2025-01-01)
  - Total: 1,230
  - Density: 41/km^{2} (110/sq mi)
- Time zone: UTC+1 (CET)
  - Summer (DST): UTC+2 (CEST)

Mas de las Matas is a municipality in the province of Teruel, Aragon, Spain. According to the 2018 census (INE), the municipality has a population of 1,299 inhabitants.

Mas de las Matas is located 5 km (3.1 mi) to the west of Aguaviva in picturesque surroundings.

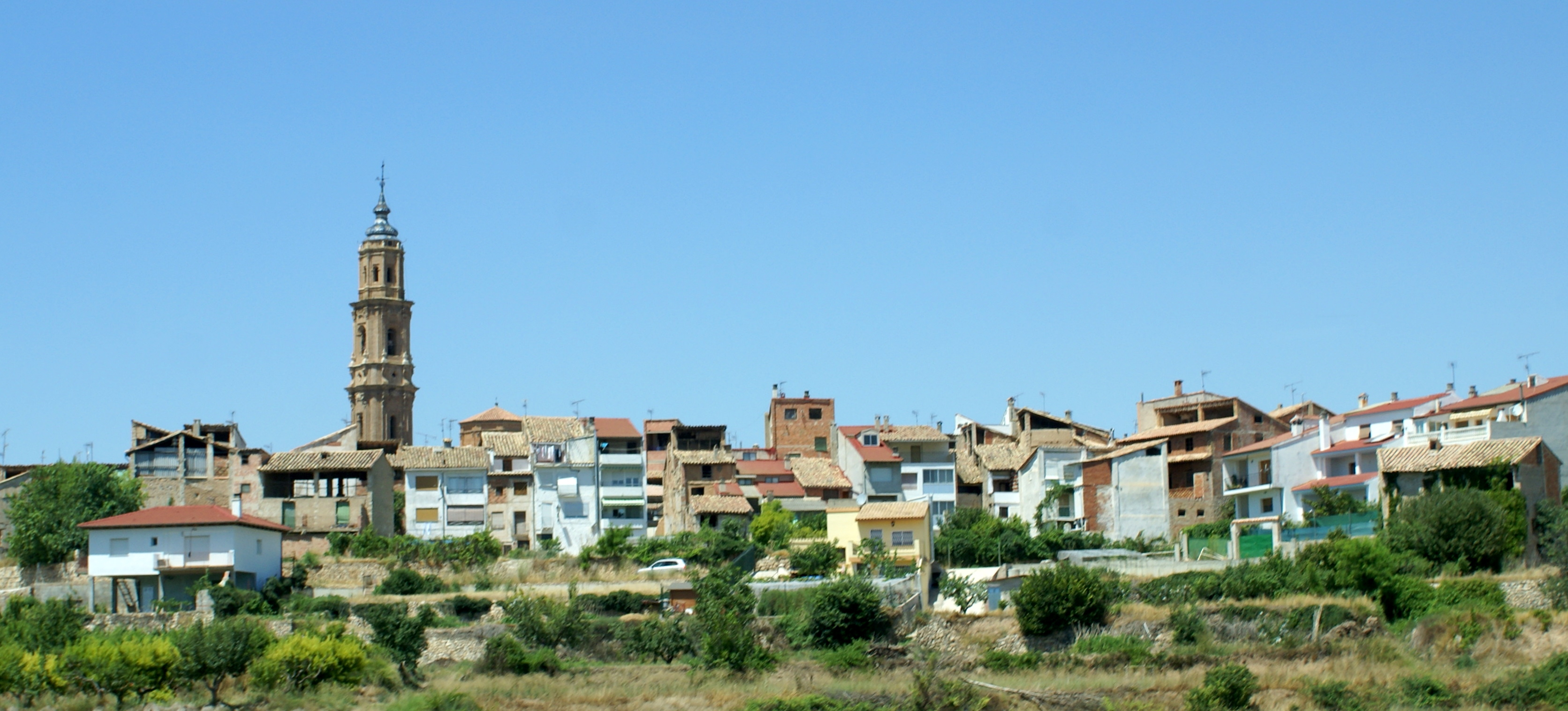
View of Mas de las Matas

== History ==
During the Spanish Civil War, the town participated in the Spanish revolution and was collectivised by the CNT and UGT.

== See also ==
- Bajo Aragón, comarca
- Lower Aragon, traditional region
- List of municipalities in Teruel
