= Caspe =

Municipality in Zaragoza Province, Aragon, Spain

- Municipality
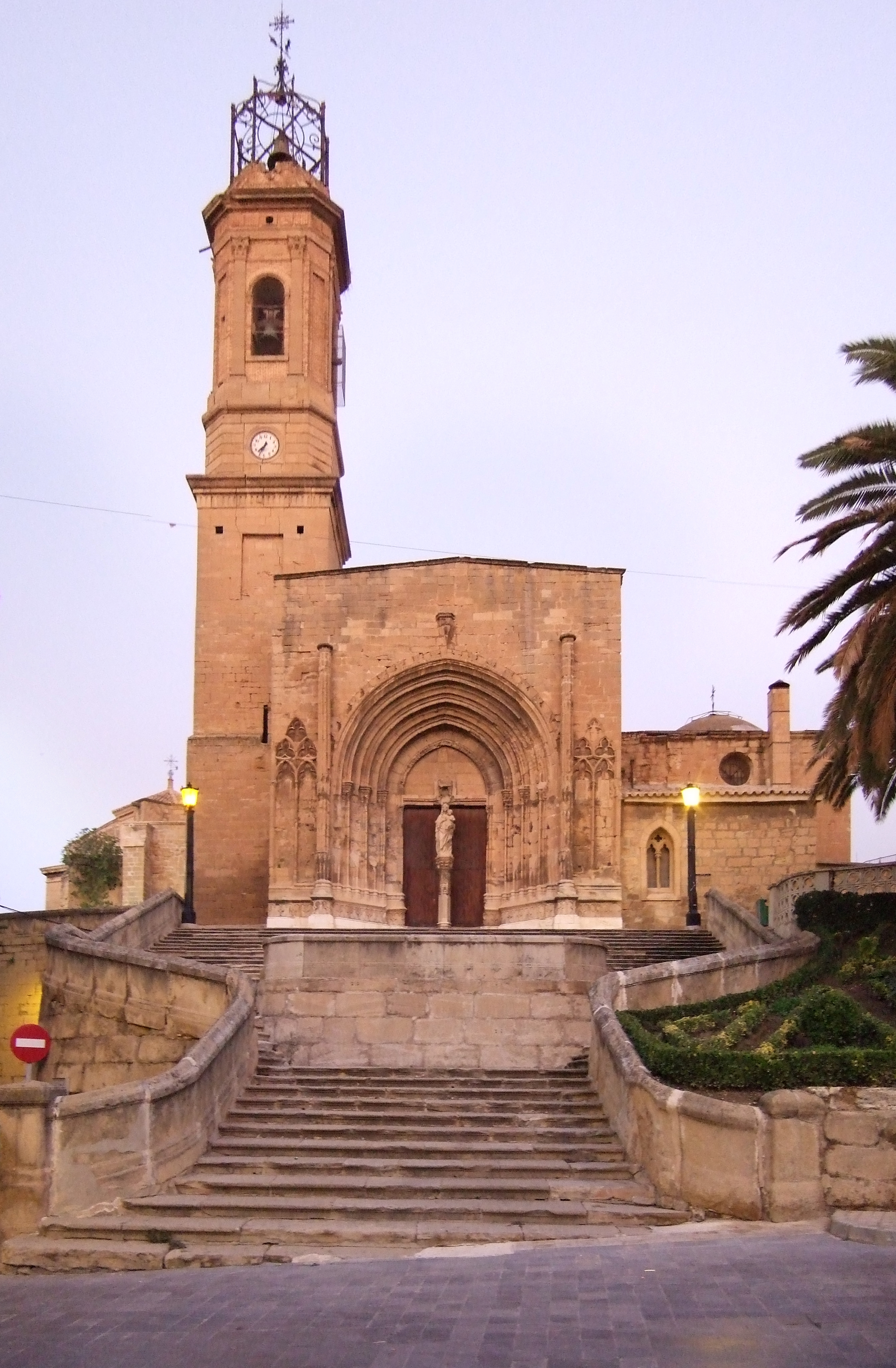
- Collegiate Church of Santa Maria la Mayor

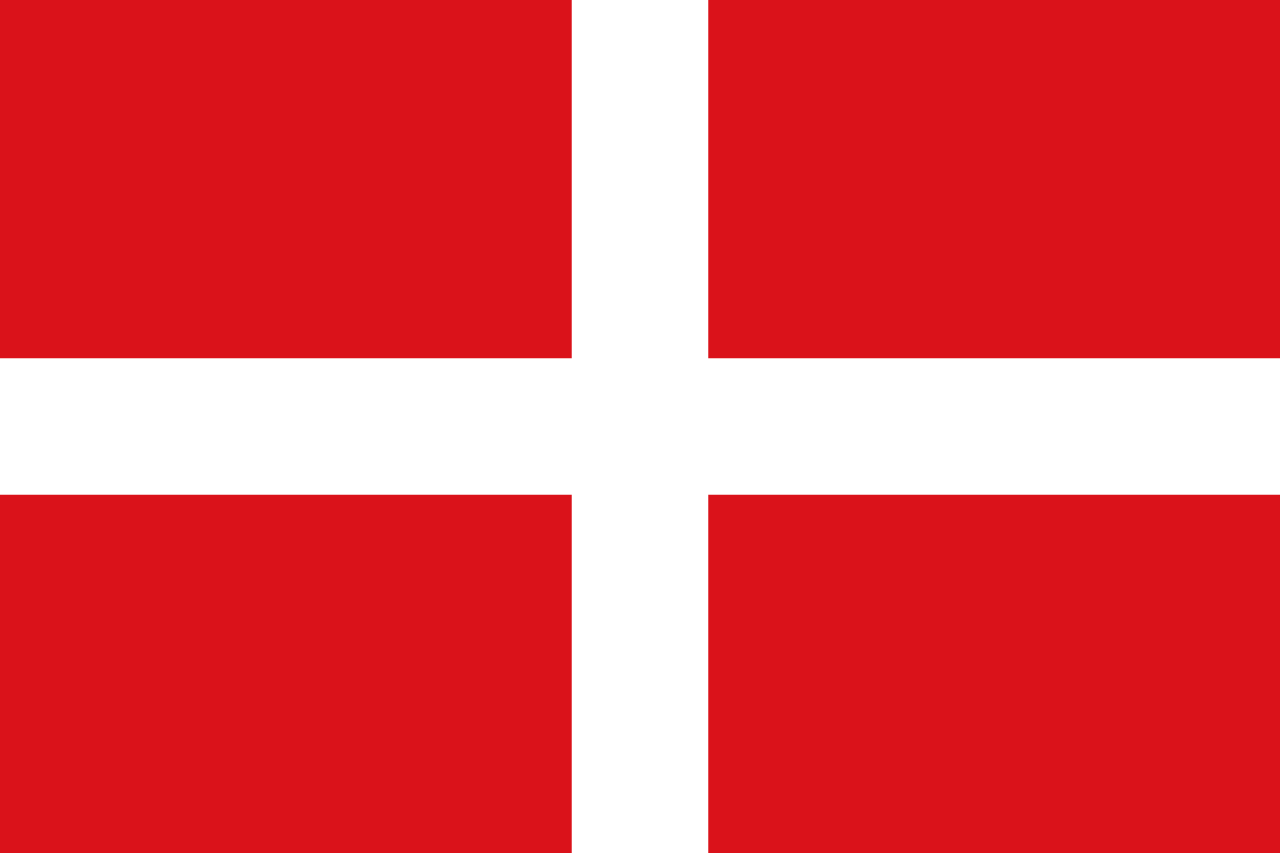
- Flag Coat of arms

- Location in Spain Caspe (Spain)
- Coordinates: 41°14′N 0°2′W
- Country: Spain
- Autonomous community: Aragon
- Province: Zaragoza
- Comarca: Bajo Aragón-Caspe/Baix Aragó-Casp

Government
  - Mayor: Pilar Herrero Poblador

Area
  - Total: 503.33 km^{2} (194.34 sq mi)
- Elevation: 150 m (490 ft)

Population (2025-01-01)
  - Total: 10,365
  - Density: 20.593/km^{2} (53.335/sq mi)
- Demonym: Caspolinos
- Postal code: 50700
- Website: Official website

Caspe is a municipality in the province of Zaragoza, part of the autonomous community of Aragon, in Spain, seat of the comarca of Bajo Aragón-Caspe. As of 2018 it had a population of 9,525 inhabitants (INE 2018) and its municipality, of 503.33 km^{2}, is the fourth largest in Aragon.

Caspe obtained the title of "city" in the 19th century, as a result of the damage suffered in the Carlist Wars, by concession of Queen Isabella II.

== Name ==
There is a popular belief that Caspe is named for ancient inhabitants of the city reportedly from the Caspian Sea. However this widespread etymology lacks philological rigor. The place name Casp was documented in Andalusi sources as "Qsp", "Qasp" or "Qasb", and has been related to the Arabic word "Casba". It is also possible that the name of the city derives from the Indo-European root Cass ("oak") and the suffix pe ("place of" or "below").

== Geography ==
Caspe is located at 41.2 degrees north in latitude and on the Greenwich meridian. It is 104 kilometers southeast of Zaragoza on the banks of the Guadalope river—which no longer carries water in this section, having been diverted upstream when the Mequinenza reservoir, also called the Sea of Aragon, was built —and a few kilometers from the Ebro. It is 152 meters above sea level, in one of the most arid areas of Aragon, with an average temperature of 15 °C and 325 mm of annual precipitation.

It is located at the crossroads of two axes: the Ebro — in an east–west direction, partly used by the railway — and, perpendicular to it, the one that, starting from Andorra, passes through Alcañiz and continues to Barbastro and Monzón.

== Flora and fauna ==
Due to its combination of steppe, river, forest, and Mediterranean forest, Caspe is home to a large diversity of fauna and flora.

It has a diverse year-round population of birds of prey, such as golden eagles, Eurasian griffon vultures, peregrine falcons, common buzzards, goshawks and sparrowhawks. European merlins, kites and hen harriers in winter, as well as black kites, Egyptian vultures, European short-toed, alcotans, ash harriers and lesser kestrels in summer. Nocturnal birds of prey include the long-eared owl, the little owl, Scops owl and the barn owl. Although not as extensive as in its surroundings, Caspe has a population of steppe birds that include the great bustard and common curlew, both species of sandgrouse; the black-bellied sandgrouse and the pin-tailed sandgrouse, as well as the great spotted cuckoo. The steppe landscape comprises the juniper, black juniper, rosemary, thyme, and reeds.

Its gallery forests create a complex habitat that joins the mountain landscapes and rainfed fields. Waterfowl can be found, such as the mallard duck, gray heron, imperial heron, little bittern, little egret, and kingfisher. These forests are mainly made up of black poplars, reeds, and reed beds. Some forest species inhabit the bush landscape, such as the sparrowhawk above and goshawk, in addition to others, such as the standard turtle dove and bee-eater in summer, the crossbill, red partridge and the increasingly rare common quail. The Mediterranean and mountain forests are mainly made up of Aleppo pine, black juniper and white sable, corolla, ginesta, romerales, and thyme.

As for mammals, the red deer stands out since it is the only deer that never became extinct in Aragon; also, the wild boar, common badger, common fox, marten, genet, otter, weasel, roe deer, ordinary rabbit, Iberian hare and rodents such as voles or field mice, among others. Caspe's diversity of habitats makes possible the presence of a considerable variety of amphibians and reptiles. In the ponds and puddles of the hills, there are common toads, spur toads, running toads, spotted toads, common frogs, and viper snakes. In addition, the ocellated lizard, bastard snake, horseshoe snake, and ladder snake are found throughout the territory, as well as the leper turtle in the river. In some forest areas, the rare snout viper lives.

Caspe also has a considerable population of white storks in the convent of Santo Domingo and the Colegiata de Santa María la Mayor (Caspe), with a total of 17 couples (2018).

== Prehistory and archeology ==
The municipality of Caspe seems to have been one of the last to be populated within Lower Aragon, either due to environmental problems with the prehistoric habitat or because erosion has destroyed the deposits.

However, in the area of Cauvaca an amygdaloid biface was discovered that can be ascribed to a generic Acheulean or an initial Mousterian, 150,000 – 100,000 years ago, which demonstrates, at least, the passage through this area of groups of Neanderthal hunter-gatherers. Similar lithic cores have been found in Soto de Vinué V.

The rock art at the Plano del Polido site stands out. Located though a small opening in the sandstone, it comprises a set of Levantine-style cave paintings. The composition brings together several figures, highlighting a magnificent deer in an alert attitude to start the fight with another congener no that appears with lowered antlers. Between both figures a doe can be seen, in a lower position, and there is also a fourth figure, quite lost, which is possibly another doe. Paint traces at the far right of the composition seem to correspond to the figure of an archer.

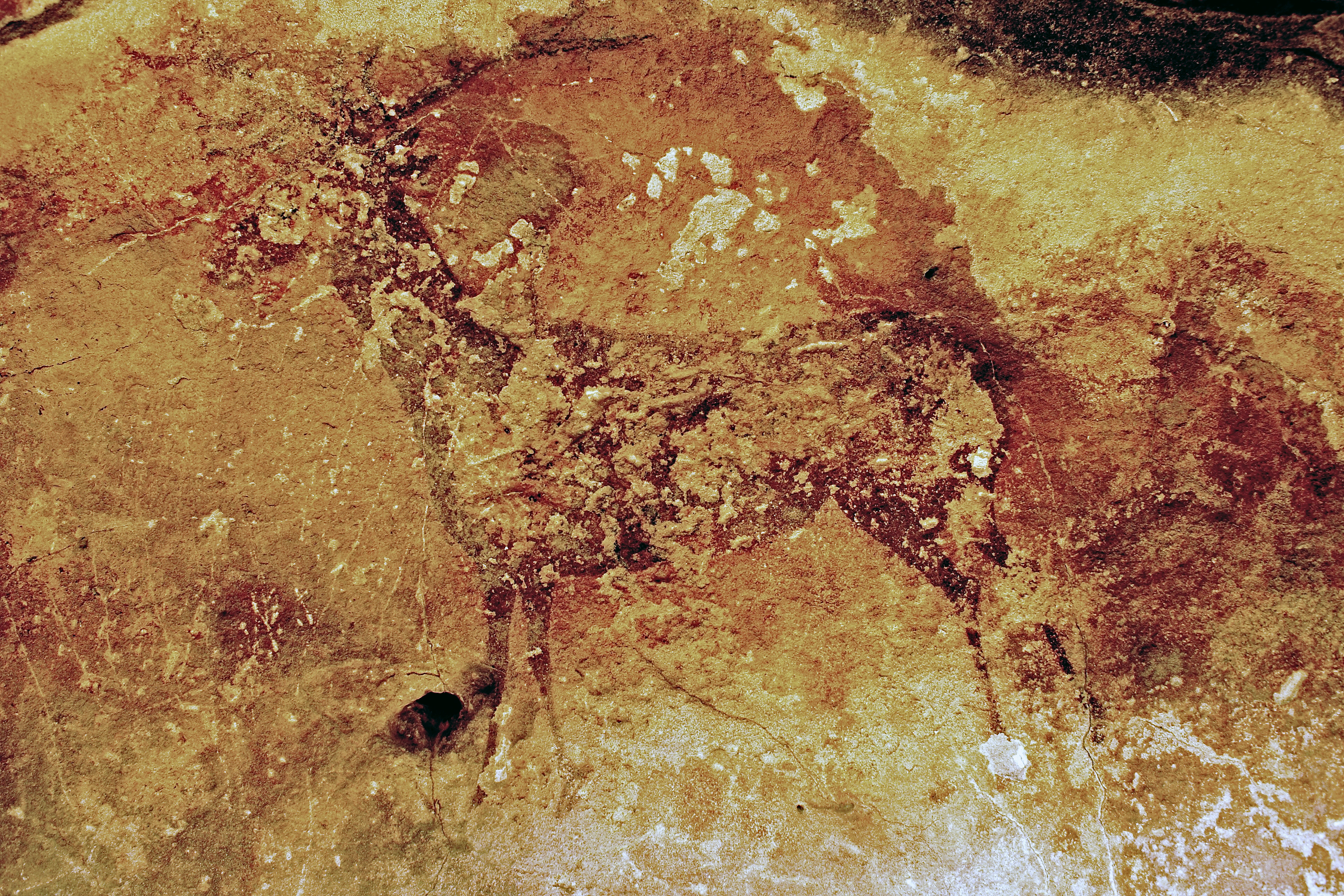

The demographic and cultural emergence of Caspe took place around the 8th century BC with the appearance of towns and tumular necropolises of the Indo-European Celtic Hallstatt culture from the early Iron Age, which mainly correspond to populations of the Segre basin and the high Ebro basin, especially from Navarre and Álava.

Among the late Bronze deposits, it is worth mentioning Cabezos de Sancharancón. This town is on the road from Caspe to Zaragoceta, quadrangular houses on a conical hill with many sandstone blocks accumulated on the slopes. The ceramic materials collected on the surface typologically fit with those of the advanced Middle Bronze, although there are also a very few remains of vessels that can be attributed to the Urnfield culture, in addition to carved flints.

Another interesting deposit is the Cabezo de Monleón, on the Guadalope river, where 52 houses that make up a central street plan have been identified. Its population has been estimated at 300 inhabitants and the occupation by those shepherds, metallurgists and cereal farmers could have extended between 800 BCE and Iberization.

The deposit of Loma de los Brunos dates from the Iberian era, located in the vicinity of the Civán dam. It corresponds to the old phase of Iberian settlement (6th to 5th centuries BCE). Chronologically later is the town of La Tallada, occupied from the 4th century BCE to its destruction and abandonment in the 1st century BC. Located atop of a hill, it is medium in size and consisted of rectangular houses, many of them carved out of the rock.

From the 1st century, the Ebro valley was fully Romanized and the sites, identified as Roman villas, of Azud de Civán, Boquera del Regallo I-II, Mas de Rabel, Campo de Ráfales, Picardías, Soto de Baños, El Fondón and Miralpeix date from that time. From this last enclave is the Miralpeix Mausoleum, which was moved to its current location as a result of the construction of the Mequinenza reservoir that led to the flooding of the monument. It was built in the late 2nd or early 3rd century AD.

Likewise, local historiography mentions the remains of the city of Trabia, an indigenous population destroyed by the Romans who came to coin money. Both Trabia and the nearby place of Valdurrios are pre-Roman place names. According to some authors, a medieval town was built on its ruins, but did not last. Trabia had owned its carta puebla since the middle of the 12th century, which indicates that the place had some importance. It was inhabited at least until 1440, the year in which the figure of Justice was last attested.

== History ==
=== Antiquity ===
It has been maintained that, before the Roman conquest of Hispania, the lands that the municipality currently occupies were inhabited by the Sedetani, an Iberian group from the 3rd century BCE. However, recent investigations place the Ausetani (Ositans) in the Caspe region, whose capital, Osicerda, may have been located in the Cabezo Palao de Alcañiz. This city-state and its territory possibly reached the Ebro to the north and the Matarraña river to the east, a border between Ositans and Ilercavones.

=== Middle Ages ===
From the arrival of the Muslims in 713 to the Christian reconquest in the first half of the 12th century, the lands of the Ebro constituted the northernmost mark of Al-Andalus, a sector occupied by the Yemeni contingent. In this territory, Latin culture predominated over the Hispanic-Roman and Visigoth indigenous population of Christians and Jews; but from the 10th century on, Arabization and Islamization of the population prevailed, leaving Christians and Jews relegated to a small percentage.

Between June and September 1169, Caspe was integrated into the Crown of Aragon by King Alfonso II. The conquest of the town was carried out under the direction of the Count of Pallars, Arnau Mir de Tost, and his son Ramón, in collaboration with other feudal lords. In the Annals of the Crown of Aragon by Jerónimo Zurita, the following is narrated:

At this time, the Moors who were in the region of the Edetanos in the castles and forces they had on the banks of the Algas river were waging a great war ... And Caspe was won, a very important place along the banks of the Ebro And from there the war continued on the banks of Guadalob and the Calanda river.

It is estimated that the number of inhabitants of Caspe, at the time of the Reconquista, could have been somewhat higher than 1,000 inhabitants, overwhelmingly Islamic. Muslims were allowed to keep their religious practices, but had a year to leave their own homes and move outside the city walls. It cannot be specified when Jews arrived in Caspe, but what is certain is that when the troops of Alfonso II entered, Jews already lived in the La Muela neighborhood, sharing it with Muslims.

The town then passed to the Order of the Hospital of Saint John of Jerusalem through a land swap carried out with Alfonso II for other assets of the order. Its castle was used as residence of the bailiwick of the hospital. The population stabilized in the last quarter of the 13th century, after Garcelán de Timor was appointed commander of the bailiwick of Caspe. The town, which then had about 1,500 inhabitants, expanded from La Muela to the surrounding farmhouses with the castle of the Order at the top and the church of Santa María for the whole of the Christian community.

In 1392, Juan Fernández de Heredia, grand master of the order, bought all the possessions in the town (from the Sesé family) to found a convent. He raised the church to the category of collegiate church and increased the importance of the Sanjuanista Convent by endowing it with treasures and relics such as a lignum crucis. When he died, his body was brought from Avignon and buried in the convent church, in a tomb that he himself had carved.

In medieval times, Caspe was the largest Aragonese center for the production of glass; and one of the largest in Spain. Thirty glass furnaces are known to have existed in its municipal area. The large amount of saline soils favored the growth of Salsola kali (syn. Kali turgidum), a type of plant from which the ashes are useful in the production of glass, and this, together with the quality and quantity of the sand, were the basic elements for that manufacture. It seems that Jews were the first involved in this industry, mainly between the 14th and 15th centuries. Many of the glaziers belonged to the most important families in the town.

In the fourteenth century, the black plague ravaged the Kingdom of Aragon; There is evidence that the epidemic had reached in Caspe in 1371, even forcing the sessions of the Cortes Generales to move elsewhere. According to the Anales de Valimaña, about 300 people in the town died of the plague.

The population was the scene in 1412 of the historic "Compromiso de Caspe", when Martin I of Aragon died without descendants. On April 22 of that year, the deliberations of the delegates began, and on June 28 he was proclaimed King Fernando de Trastamara, called that of Antequera, as Fernando I of Aragón. In front of the door that gives access to the apse of Santa María la Mayor, a platform was erected, from which the people were informed of the declaration of right voted by the delegates of the States of the Crown of Aragon in favor of Don Fernando. The following day, Fray Vicente de Ferrer, who had taken a very active part in the sessions of the well-known Commitment, preached at the church.

Caspe remained for the rest of the 15th century a thriving town with its neighborhoods of La Muela, San Roque and El Pueyo, and an agricultural economy that took advantage of irrigation by the Ebro and Guadalope. At that time Pope Benedict XIII, better known as Pope Luna, visited the town to settle matters between his own family, the Luna, and the Urrea.

=== Modern age ===
Until 1610, the Christian and Muslim communities continued to populate the town. Although they shared the old irrigated land, each had its own municipal area, as well as its own communal assets. Both were vassals of the Order of Saint John of Jerusalem.

Due to its geographical situation, Caspe has been one of the most affected populations by the different conflicts that have occurred in Spain since the 17th century. In the Catalan uprising (1640-1652), it was victim of incursions and raids by the Franco-Catalan troops, as well as fiscal exactions from the monarchy, both of which made a serious impact on its economic situation. In the War of the Spanish Succession (1701-1711) it was a follower of the Bourbon cause, while its neighbors opted for the Austrian aspirant.

=== 19th century ===
During the Peninsular War (known in Spanish as the War of Independence), French troops occupied Caspe on 4 March 1809. Abandoned soon after, it was definitively occupied from June 1809 to 1813. The most important figure in that period was that of the local lawyer Agustín de Quinto, an afrancesado who collaborated in government tasks with the French. In November 1810, Suchet appointed him General Commissar of the left bank of the Ebro, making Caspe, thanks to Quinto's residence in the town, the capital of the lower half of Aragon. At the end of the war (June 1813), Colonel Ramón Gayán arrived in Caspe to take the city from the French. To lift the siege, which lasted fifteen days, he resorted to the construction of two tunnels: one, from Calle de San Juan to the cellars of the Convent, and the other from the Revuelta. The explosion of the latter damaged the basement of the Castle, where the French had barricaded themselves, forcing them to flee to Mequinenza.

Later, the town was affected by the Carlist Wars, which had special relevance for the population. This was a consequence of the strategic location of the Caspe region, as well as the confiscation of the Order of Saint John of Jerusalem, which generated the discontent of the peasantry at the expectations created, and the loss of purchasing power of peasants, day laborers and artisans, due to the fall in the price of oil. These factors led to the start of the war when a mediocre group of Caspolinos escaped to the Carlist faction in 1814.

Caspe was the object of the Carlist incursions, suffering sieges, assaults and ephemeral occupations. In May 1835, during the First Carlist War, General Cabrera managed to seize part of the population; in the few hours that the Carlists occupied it, they took important spoils, looting the houses of the Queen's supporters. The following month, Llagostera took control of the first urban enclosure, burning the city afterwards; a year later he managed to take it again, to abandon it soon after. In November 1836 he returned to seize the town, retaining it in his power for eleven days. And in June 1837, Carlist troops took Caspe but, before retiring, burned the town. According to official reports, 223 houses burned, and the fire could not be quenched until the next day. The economic consequences derived from these events must have been significant, causing that henceforth, when there was news of the Carlists entering, the inhabitants flee to the farms.

Pascual Madoz, in his Geographic-Statistical-Historical Dictionary of Spain (1845), describes Caspe in the following terms:

It is located on the banks of the Guadalope river, near its confluence with the Ebro, on 3 or 4 small hills ... It is formed by 1,500 fairly regular houses, distributed in 70 fairly wide streets, 9 squares and a main square with an almost circular figure in the center of the town ... It also has a small fort supported by what was previously a parish church and the convent of San Juan.

Regarding its production, it indicates that:

The main of these is that of oil; many cereals are also harvested; the wine harvest has declined somewhat and the same happens with that of silk. There are abundant and exquisite fruits of all kinds and legumes and vegetables; likewise hemp and flax; sheep and goats are raised.

In 1861, in the interval between the Second and the Third Carlist Wars, Caspe obtained the city title. However, the political instability of the revolutionary six-year period led to a new boom for Carlist activities and, with the proclamation of the First Republic (11 February 1873), the Third Carlist War reached its greatest intensity. The most notable event took place in October of that same year when the Carlist troops from Vallés entered Caspe without encountering any resistance; in fact, 600 Caspolinos joined the Carlists, setting fire to the Bailío Castle and the old Convent of San Juan. In February 1874, a new Carlist raid took place, led this time by Marco de Bello, in order to raise funds for the purchase of weapons and to pay for the uniforms worn by his combatants.

The most relevant economic event for Caspe in the 19th century was probably the arrival of the railway. In June 1876, the municipality agreed to grant a series of privileges to the company that carried out the layout more quickly. Thus, in September 1891, work began on the municipal area of the city, finally reaching the route on 13 October 1893.

=== Twentieth century ===
In 1926 the Ebro Hydrographic Confederation was created in Caspe, an organization that manages the waters and irrigation of the Ebro hydrographic basin, the most important of the ten that have been designated in the peninsular territory.

With the Second Spanish Republic, the Statute of Autonomy of Aragon of 1936, also known as the Statute of Caspe, was drafted in this city, which had not been ratified by the Cortes at the time the outbreak of the Spanish Civil War. During the first part of the war, Caspe was the seat of the Regional Defense Council of Aragon, a government body created by the anarchists in 1936. This entity continued its functions until it was dissolved by government authorities in the summer of 1937, due to its independence from the Republican government. On August 4, the Minister of National Defense, Indalecio Prieto, issued orders to the Army and the 11th Division, under Enrique Líster, was sent to Aragon, officially dissolving the Council of Aragon in August. This dissolution took place through a military intervention that took Caspe by surprise. The Local Federation of Trade Unions (CNT) was taken by assault, tanks and artillery were concentrated at the exit of the city and some confrontations with casualties took place. Joaquín Ascaso, President of the Council of Aragon, and its anarchist members were arrested on various charges.

With the offensive of Aragon in 1938, the republican chief of staff, General Vicente Rojo, set up his operations center in this city, concentrating there all the International Brigades that he was able to gather. On March 15 the Battle of Caspe began, when three Francoist divisions of the Moroccan Army Corps reached the suburbs of the town. The 1st Division of Navarra undertook the siege of Caspe, being present, in the first phase of the battle, the International Brigades XI, XIII and XV; In a second phase that took place on the right bank of the Guadalope river, XII and XIV intervened. Although the interbrigadistas, especially those of the XV Brigade, deployed a strong defense against the attackers, at dusk on March 17 the town was finally conquered by Franco's troops. The war part of the "national" side recorded the fact with these words:

This morning the important city of Caspe has been occupied, also establishing a bridgehead 5 kilometers to the east, despite the stubborn resistance opposed by five international brigades.

After the conquest, the town became the headquarters of the Moroccan Army Corps, in charge of the troops of the Ebro river.

== Demography ==
In the 1495 census of the Kingdom of Aragon ordered by Fernando the Catholic, Caspe had 295 households, an approximate population of 1,600 inhabitants. Among them 10% were Mudejar Muslims, 5% Jews and 6% clerics, including Hospital Order knights.

The 1857 census of Spain, which inaugurated the statistical series, records a population of 10,609 inhabitants in the town, at that time the third most populous in the province of Zaragoza, after the capital and Calatayud. In the 20th century, Caspe reached its maximum population, 9,981 inhabitants, in 1950. Starting in the 1960s, the rural exodus began, which affected all of Aragon, and resulted in a decrease in the population.

In 2018 the population of Caspe reached 9,525 inhabitants, similar to the population it had in the middle of the 20th century. On the other hand, in recent years there has been a considerable increase in the immigrant population.

== Heritage ==
The cave paintings in the shelter of the Plano del Pulido, declared a World Heritage Site by Unesco in 1998, and several Neolithic sites.

The Roman Miralpeix Mausoleum was declared a national monument in 1931. It consists of a rectangular cella with side walls that support a barrel vault framed in front with two pilasters with Corinthian columns.

=== Religious heritage ===
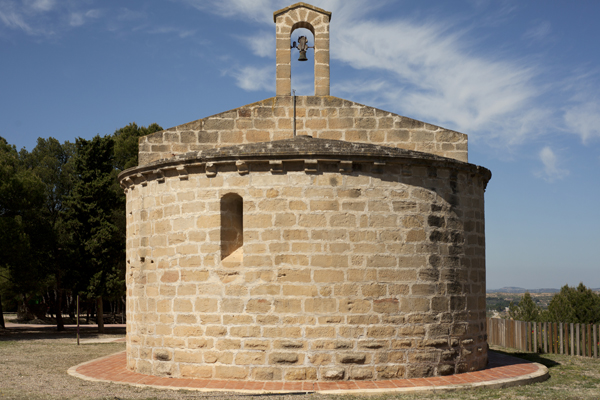

The Hermitage of Santa María de Horta, rescued from the Mequinenza reservoir and rebuilt on top of a hill overlooking Caspe, is a Romanesque construction. The temple was erected by people from the town of Miralpeix in a popular Romanesque style at the end of the 12th century or the beginning of the 13th century. It is built in ashlar masonry and has an elongated keyhole-shaped plan, divided into five sections. Also known as Santa María del Fondón, due to its primitive location, it has an interesting semicircular apse.

The Collegiate Church of Santa María la Mayor del Pilar is by far the most monumental building in Caspe. It is one of the most notable examples of purist Gothic in Aragon, still influenced by the Cistercian style. The temple consists of three naves, the central nave being the widest and tallest, all of it covered by a ribbed vault. It was consecrated by Hadrian VI in 1522 and previously, in 1412, the mass proclaiming the ruling of the Caspe Commitment was held there. Located in the highest area of the urban area, it was part of an acropolis organized by the Order of Saint John, which included the church, the castle, which has already been restored today to commemorate the sixth centenary of the celebration of the Commitment to Caspe, and the convent. In 1936 the altarpieces and the two superb Gothic tombs of the Collegiate Church were destroyed, including that of the great master Juan Fernández de Heredia.

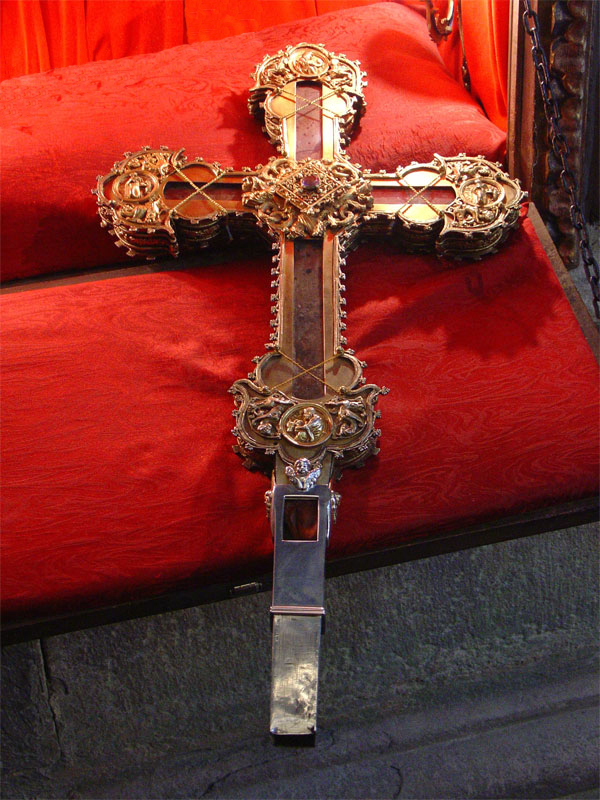
A lignum crucis

Currently, the Vera Cruz de Caspe, one of the most important relics of Christendom, is guarded inside; It is one of the largest fragments of the cross on which Christ died (lignum crucis). In 1908 the church atrium was declared a National Monument and in 1931 the whole of the Collegiate Church was declared a National Monument.

Several hermitages are preserved in the streets of Caspe, such as Santa Quiteria (1648), or Montserrat —destroyed during the War of Independence but rebuilt in the 19th century—, Magdalena (1790) and La Balma (1843). In the La Muela neighborhood, the oldest in Caspe, is the Hermitage of San Indalecio, a baroque temple from the 18th century, which consists of a central space with a square plan covered with a hemispherical dome on lunettes illuminated with a lantern.

Another religious complex is made up of the building and church of San Agustín, which were part of what was the Convent of San Agustín de Caspe. Completed the works in 1623, it is an example of ordered and functional architecture that follows the canon of the monastic model of the 17th century. The cloister is the main element of the ensemble.

Located in front of the railway station, is the Convent of Santo Domingo, whose church is completely in ruins. During the War of Independence it was a military hospital, cemetery, prison and fortress. Again it was a war hospital in the Civil War, being definitively abandoned in 1978.

=== Civil heritage ===
Within the civil architecture, the Castle of Commitment stands out, whose origin is due to the knights of the Hospital Order. For years the site was used not only as a castle but also as a convent, along with the neighboring church of Santa María. In the 19th century the castle almost disappeared, because during the War of Independence, the French troops blew up the convent and also, in the Carlist wars, it was involved in various combats, even being burned down. Currently, there is hardly any element of the fortress — a wall with a crenellated top with voussoirs decorated with shields — as well as the basements of the fortress.

Another notable bulwark is the Torre de Salamanca, which stands on a hill on the outskirts of the city. From the viewpoint located at the top, you can see a spectacular panoramic view of Caspe and the Ebro valley. It was built by order of General Salamanca in the last Carlist war - the third one - in 1874, being the most modern castle in Aragon. It houses the Heraldry Museum, which collects the heraldic symbols that were characteristic of the Crown of Aragon.

In the urban center, the Plaza Mayor constitutes an interesting complex. On one side of it remain the primitive arcades, in pointed form, called Arcos de Toril, while on the other side is the Town Hall, with a classicist facade from the 19th century, as well as the Casa Palacio Piazuelo Barberán, the most notable of the city. On the other hand, Barrio Verde street evokes the Sephardic community, since in the past it was the main axis of the Jewish quarter.

In the municipal district of Caspe there are two watchtowers from the Carlist Wars: the Turlán Tower, located in the Herradura area about 6 km from the city, and the Valdemoro Tower, in the Magdalena district. The latter, with a square floor plan and built in masonry, was erected during the Third Carlist War in order to monitor the Ebro pass. Another enclave of great beauty is the Puente de los Masatrigos, located 12 km from the town center. Although the current bridge is from the 18th century, it is supported by an earlier structure that dates back to the 13th-14th centuries.

== Parties and events ==
- Fiesta de San Antón, the weekend closest to January 17. Snacks and dinners around multiple bonfires - called 'tederos' - take place throughout the city.
- Easter, declared a festival of tourist interest in Aragon. Drums, drums and bugles accompany the steps of the processions. On Good Friday the Vera Cruz Procession takes place.
- April 30 and May 1. Celebration of the labor party in the Mas de la Punta area, with night camping and musical performances.
- Commemoration of the Caspe Commitment, the last weekend of June. The great participation of all the people in the decoration of the streets as well as in the setting of the party with medieval costumes. It has also been declared a festival of regional tourist interest.
- San Roque festivities, from August 12 to 17. On the 16th, the patron saint's feast, there is an offering of fruits as well as a procession to the Hermitage of San Roque. Dances, heifers, competitions and sports activities complete the festive program.
- Regional fair Expocaspe from October 29 to November 1. It is an agricultural, livestock, industrial and commercial fair in Bajo Aragón.

== Sports ==
In football, the city is represented by C.D. Caspe.

== Notable Caspolinos ==
- Indalecio, one of the Seven Apostolic Men and first bishop of Almería.
- José María Albareda (1902–1966), professor of agriculture and general secretary of the Higher Council for Scientific Research (CSIC).
- Sebastián Cirac Estopañán (1903–1970), professor of Greek Philology at the University of Barcelona.
- Abel Mustieles (b. 1991), mountain bike trials cyclist.

== Twin towns ==
- Almería, Spain, since 1998
- (France) Gaillac, Francia
- Santa Maria a Vico, Italy
- Regla, Cuba

== See also ==
- List of municipalities in Zaragoza
