= Tazona =

Human settlement in Albacete Province, Castile-La Mancha, Spain

Coordinates: 38°19′N 1°55′W

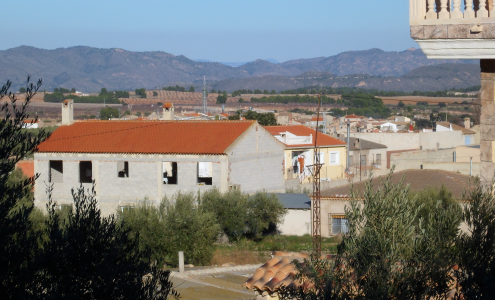
Tazona

Tazona is a village in Albacete, Castile-La Mancha, Spain. It has another village, called Los Olmos, that adjoins it and several other small satellite villages within 2 km. Tazona village has shops, pharmacy, dentist, banks, bars and a hotel. There a small, hygienic hospital in nearby Socovos and an Ambulance station which serves the area.

Tazona hosts a fiesta and bull run each spring and a parade where St Dolores visits every house and blesses each threshold in Tazons, Los Olmos and Canada Buendia.

Los Olmos has a traditional small and simple church, and there is a walled cemetery in walking distance of the church.
