= Bajo Aragón =

Coordinates: 41°02′N 0°07′W

Bajo Aragón Baxo Aragón (Aragonese) Baix Aragó (Catalan) Lower Aragon
- Comarca
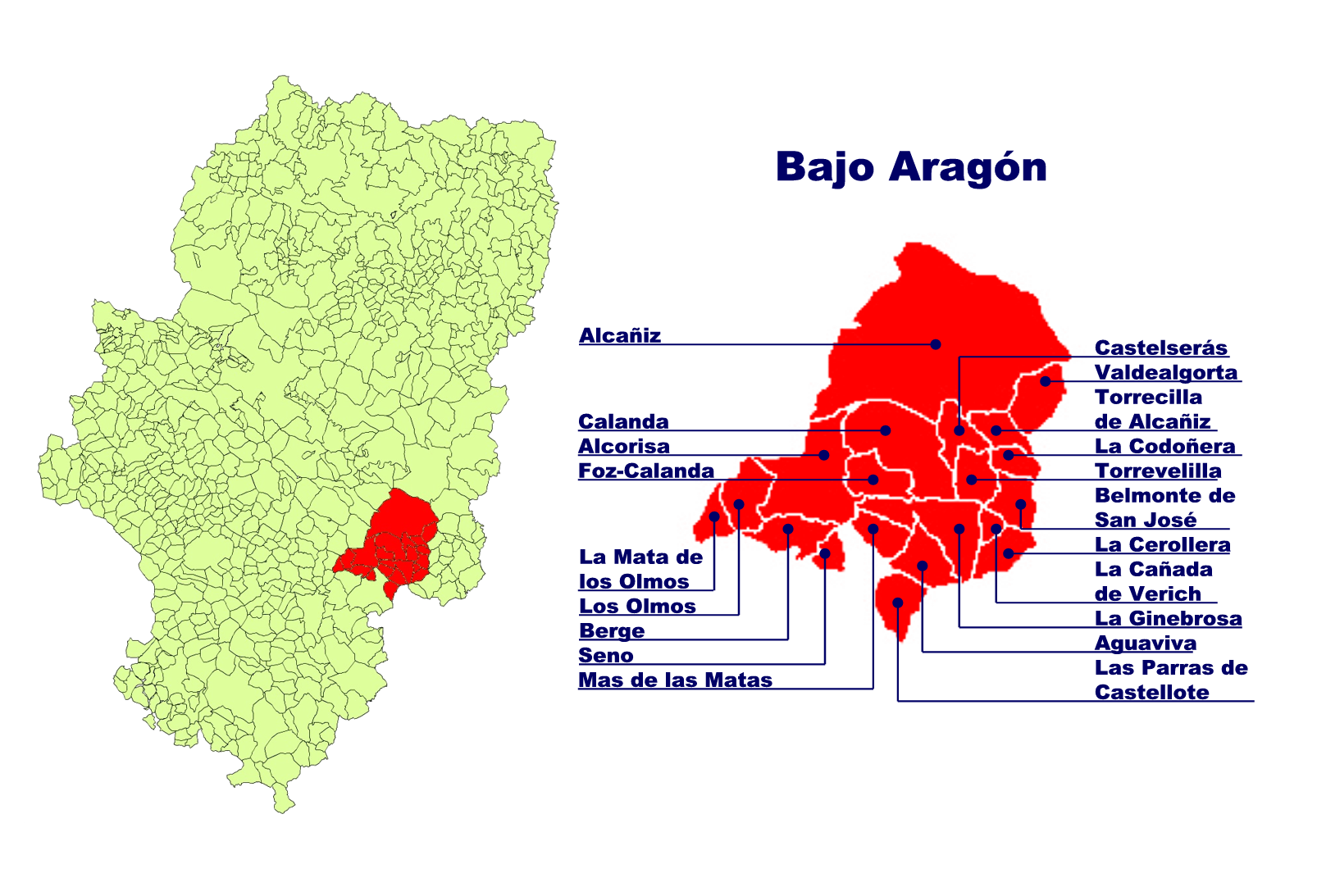
- Location of Bajo Aragón in Aragón and location of the municipalities in Bajo Aragón.
- Country: Spain
- Autonomous community: Aragón
- Province: Teruel
- Capital: Alcañiz
- Municipalities: List: See text

Area
  - Total: 1,304.2 km^{2} (503.6 sq mi)

Population (2008)
  - Total: 30,146
  - Density: 23.115/km^{2} (59.866/sq mi)
- Demonym: bajoaragonés/a
- Time zone: UTC+1 (CET)
  - Summer (DST): UTC+2 (CEST)
- Largest municipality: Alcañiz
- Website: Official website

Bajo Aragón (Spanish: [ˈbaxo aɾaˈɣon]; Aragonese: Baxo Aragón; Catalan: Baix Aragó), or Lower Aragon, is an administrative comarca in eastern central Aragon, Spain. It was first established in 1999. It has a population of 29,358 (2007) and an area of 1.304,2 km^{2}. The seat of the comarca is in Alcañiz. It is located in Teruel Province, in the transitional area between the Iberian System and the Ebro Valley.

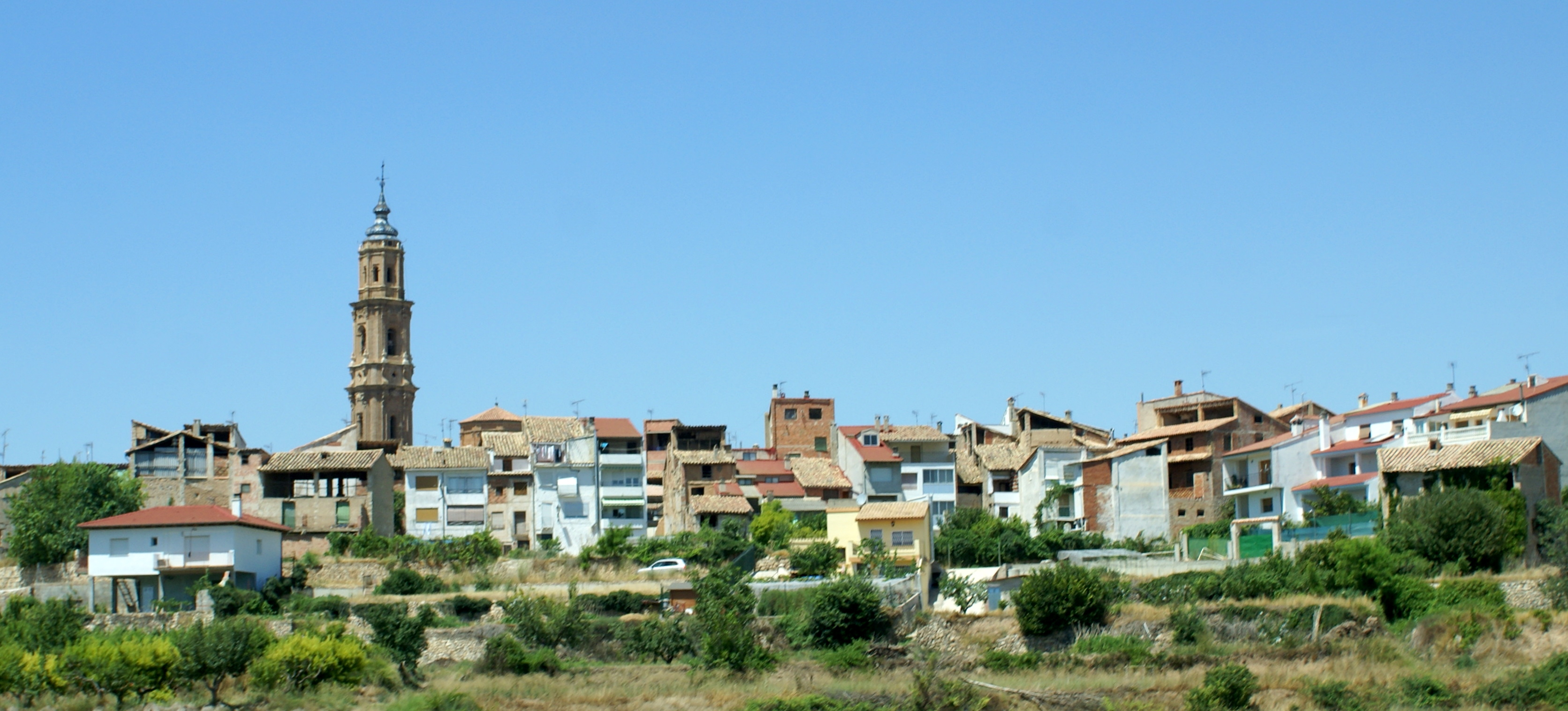
View of Mas de las Matas.

The municipalities of Aguaviva, Belmonte de San José, La Cañada de Verich, La Cerollera, La Codoñera, La Ginebrosa and Torrevelilla belong to the Catalan-speaking strip in eastern Aragon known as La Franja.

== Historical region ==
The name Bajo Aragón, Lower Aragon, was already used before 1999 for a much larger area, a historical region now sometimes called Bajo Aragón histórico in order to differentiate it from the present-day administrative comarca.

== Municipalities ==
The Catalan version of the names of the towns are in brackets.

- Aguaviva (Aiguaviva de Bergantes)
- Alcañiz
- Alcorisa
- Belmonte de San José (Bellmunt de Mesquí)
- Berge
- Calanda
- La Cañada de Verich (La Canyada de Beric)
- Castelserás
- La Cerollera (La Sorollera)
- La Codoñera (La Codonyera)
- Foz-Calanda
- La Ginebrosa
- Mas de las Matas
- La Mata de los Olmos
- Los Olmos
- Las Parras de Castellote
- Seno
- Torrecilla de Alcañiz
- Torrevelilla (La Torre de Vilella)
- Valdealgorfa

== See also ==
- Lower Aragon
- Matarranya historical comarca
- Comarcas of Aragon
- La Franja
