= Seno, Aragon =

Seno
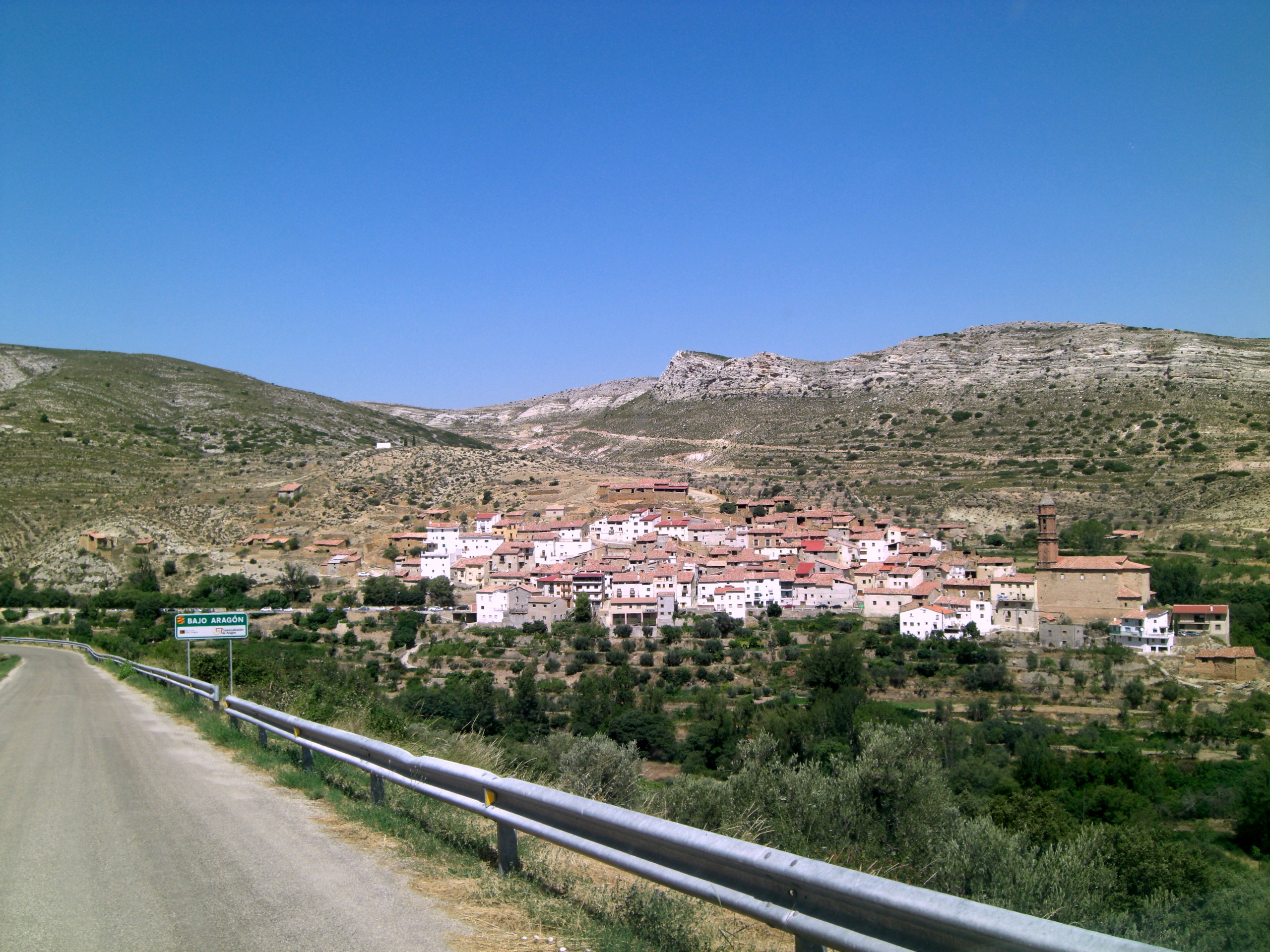

- Coat of arms

- Location within Spain
- Coordinates: 40°49′N 0°20′W
- Country: Spain
- Autonomous community: Aragon
- Province: Teruel
- Comarca: Bajo Aragón

Area
  - Total: 17.9 km^{2} (6.9 sq mi)
- Elevation: 792 m (2,598 ft)

Population (2025-01-01)
  - Total: 39
  - Density: 2.2/km^{2} (5.6/sq mi)
- Time zone: UTC+1 (CET)
  - Summer (DST): UTC+2 (CEST)

Seno is a municipality located in the Bajo Aragon area, close to Maestrazgo in province of Teruel, Aragon, Spain, at an altitude of 792 m. According to the 2018 census the municipality has a population of 39 inhabitants.

Seno has an interesting Church (s. XVIII) dedicated to St. Helen, and a fountain with an ermitage devoted to St Valero, where tradition says this bishop passed by when he was thirsty and created this source of water by praying to God and hitting the ground with his staff.

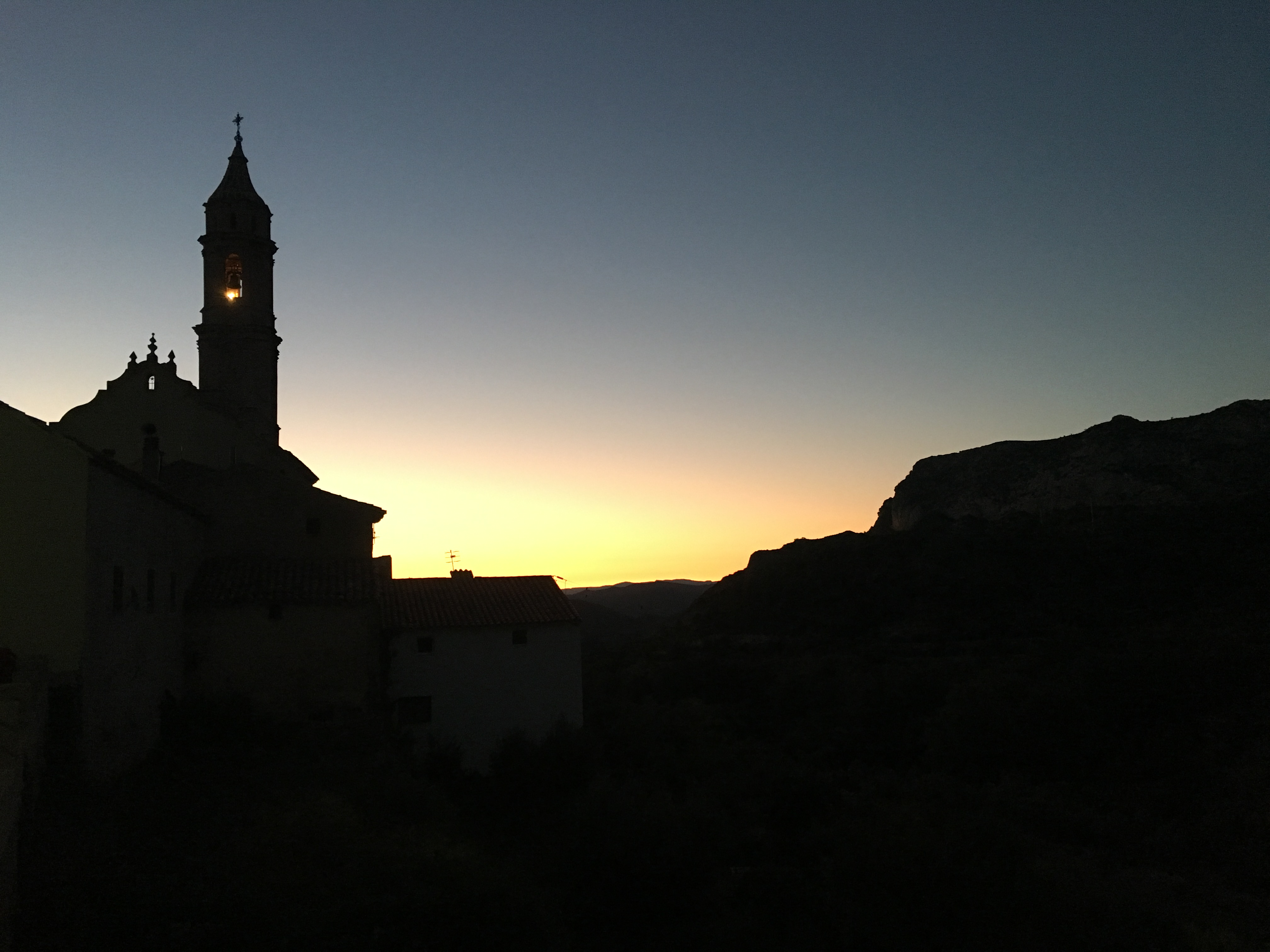
The light of the bell tower of the Church of Seno at dawn

== Geography ==
The houses in this locality are crowded around the church of Santa Elena (Saint Helena), building of masonry of century XVIII and slender tower Mudejar, constructed by popular subscription. The paintings on the main altar, with the 8 women of the Old Testament and Saint Helena, as well as the dome of the Holy Spirit, damaged during the Spanish Civil War, are noteworthy inside. In the same square of the Church is the town hall, building completed in 1785, with a ratchet in the bottom where the ball-hand sport is practiced.

At a distance from the town, there is the hermitage of San Valero, patron of the town, which was also raised in the 18th century, next to the spring of the same name, which is attributed certain curative properties, and which springs from the ground to the same temperature (15 °C) throughout the year. The tradition that this bishop of Zaragoza of the s. IV passed the way of his exile by this valley, and when not finding water, it struck with his staff in this point, creating the source to which it gives name to him.

There are in this town several important water springs (up to 12) which also supplies the region, and which make possible the existence of crops and a rich orchard (peaches, almonds, olive trees). In the surrounding mountains there is an abundant colony of birds of prey (griffon vultures), and another of Hispanic goats.

At some distance from the village and to the north, about 300 meters, is the neighborhood of Paris, now almost uninhabited.

== History ==
The origins of Seno are very remote. The first remains found in the vicinity of the town come from the Neolithic, the Bronze Age or the Iron Age (e.g. the iron ore mine of Valdestrada, s.V. de C.). In its municipal term there are also Iberian remains (e.g. Vallipón, Iberian village destroyed by Roman legions) or of Muslim and Templar fortifications (e.g. near the Fuente del Salz).

The first time that the existence of the locality is documented is in the letter of population of Camarón (1194). During the 12th and 13th centuries it appears in different documents Templar and sanjuanistas like "castellar". Therefore, it is very likely that the first construction located where today is the Villa de Seno was a defense tower, probably Templar, as several existing in the area. Templar signs are present throughout the area, with their symbols, forts, fortifications, hermitages, crosses, etc. Not to forget, in addition, the nearby fortress of Castellote ("Castellot"), site of the Templar encomienda of the area, land ceded to the order of the Temple by King Alfonso II in 1196.

In the S. After several clashes with the nearby town of Castellote, King of Spain Charles II signed a privilege of segregation, although this separation did not take effect until July 23, 1789, when Charles IV definitively separated Castellote giving it the character of "Villa"to the town of Seno.

The parish church, dedicated to Saint Helena, is a baroque work carried out under the direction of Juan España, between 1763 and 1771, on the site of the old Church of the Holy Cross (1650). As the inscription on its cover reads, "Charitas me fecit", built by popular subscription. They are remarkable the spectacular paintings of the Presbytery, and the bell, of century XVIII, practically unique in Lower Aragon (the majority were broken during the Civil War by the anarchist columns).

During the Spanish civil war (1936–39), Seno was not bombed, unlike the majority of populations of the zone, reason why its population did not suffer directly the rigors of the war. The Church was converted into a store of the collectivity by the antifascist committee and much of its contents burned, saving, as has been said, the main bell of the tower. In 1938 a republican redoubt was established in the "cabezo" on the town to more than 1,000 msnm of altitude, in which numerous trenches and fortifications were constructed. On March 25 of this year, in the context of the third phase of the Battle of Aragon in which Franco divided Republican Spain into two with his troops reaching Vinaròs, the 83 division commanded by General Martín Alonso occupied the town of Seno, definitively expelling to the government troops of his redoubt in the mountain.

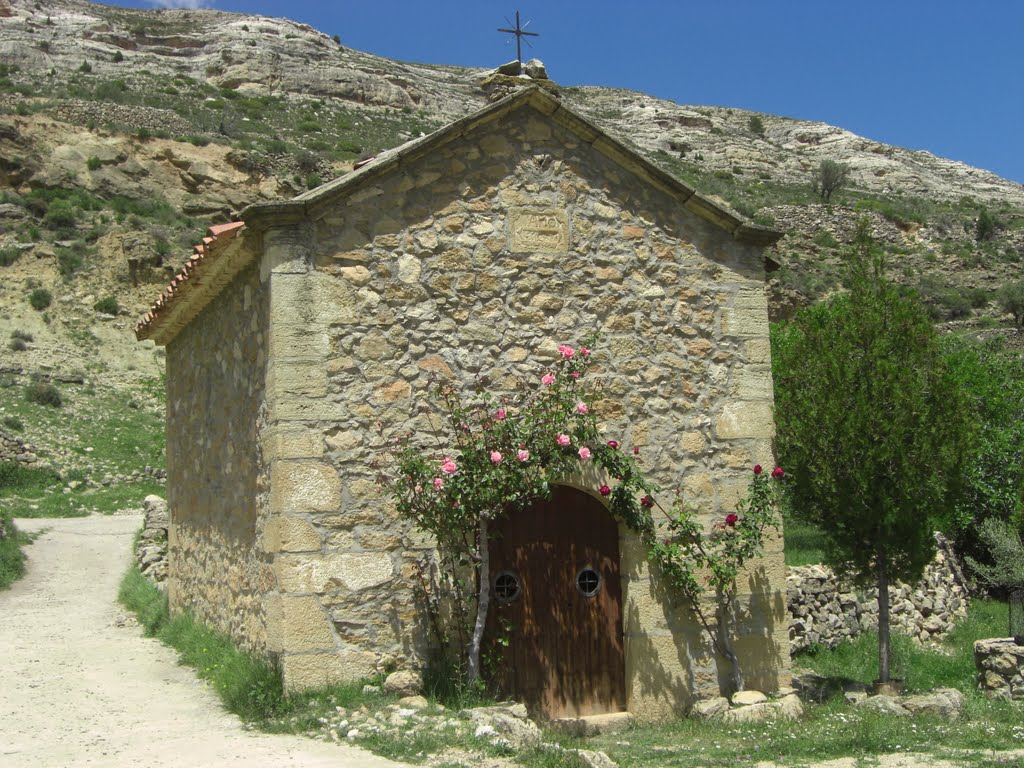
Hermitage of San Valero in Seno (Teruel)

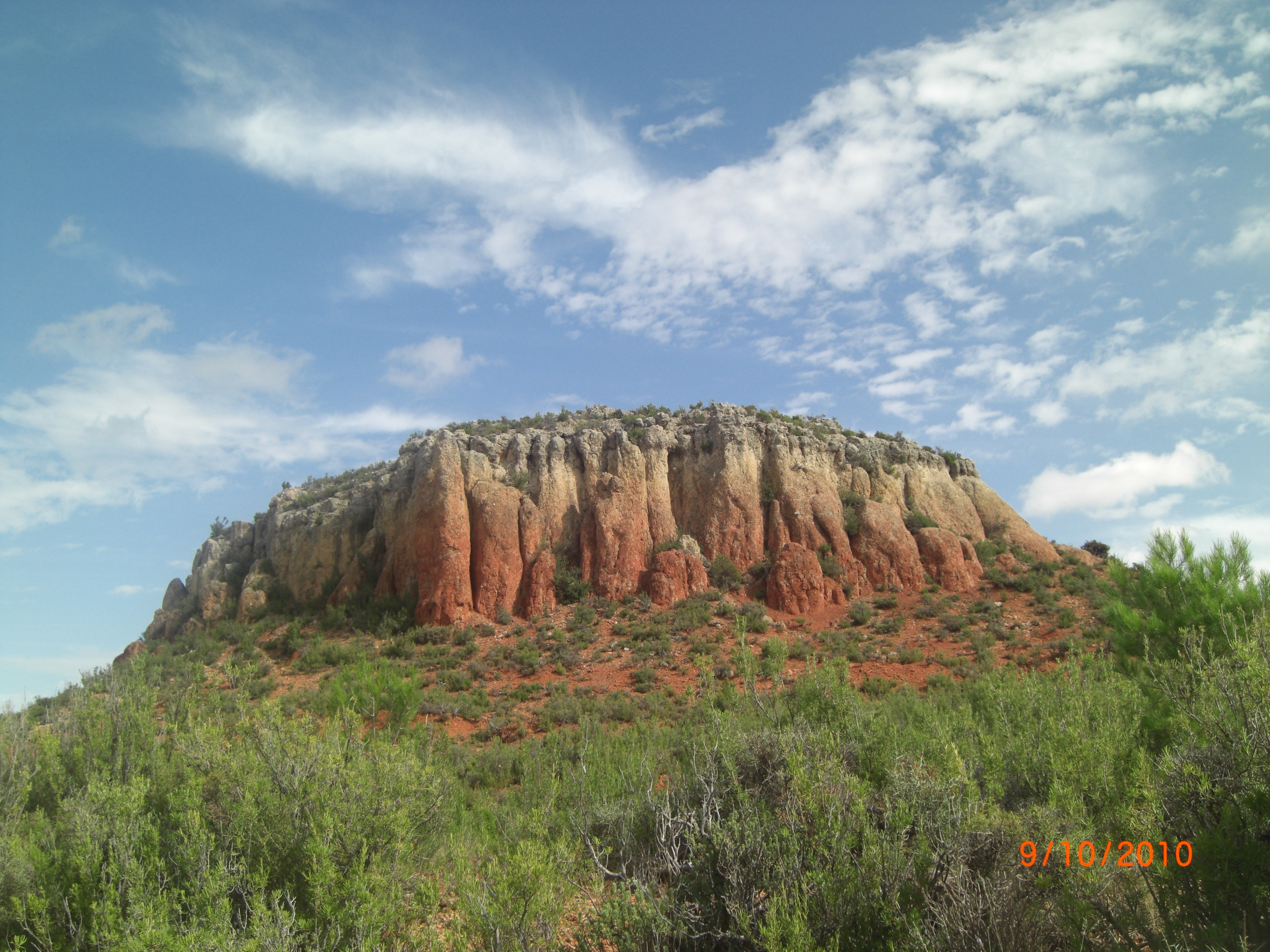
Mountain formation called "The ghosts", in Seno (Teruel)

On February 1, 2009, Seno received the visit of the Bishop of the Diocese of Teruel and Albarracín, for the blessing of the restored Parish Church of Santa Elena, carried out thanks to the donations of the faithful of Seno, the General Council Of Aragon and the Town Hall of the Villa de Seno.

In 2016 the night illumination of the tower of the Church was inaugurated.

== Festivities and events ==
The patron saint festivities are celebrated in honor of St. Valero (January 29), patron of Seno, the last weekend of January, and in honor of St. Helena, to whom the parish church is dedicated, and San Roque, 14th, August 15 and 16.

During the year, the "Senerico Sports Club" organizes two events in which the whole town participates:

- The BTT Senerica, a classic already on the calendar, with two routes (short, long), both hard and demanding. At the end of July.
- The hiker route, in early October, with two routes also (short and long), which ends with a meal of brotherhood.

== Demography ==
In a century, it has lost almost 90% of its population, according to the INE (Spain Institute of Statistics). The evolution of the population can be seen in the following table, which shows the enormous impact of emigration to industrial zones (Zaragoza, Valencia and Barcelona) in the 1960s and 1970s:

Evolution of inhabitants in Seno
1900	1910	1920	1930	1940	1950	1960	1970	1981	1991	2007	2014	2015
351	422	332	332	291	231	195	105	61	48	45	42	43
Source: Spain Statistics Institute -IN- (Spain)

== See also ==
- List of municipalities in Teruel
