= José María Albareda =

Spanish soil scientist and science administrator

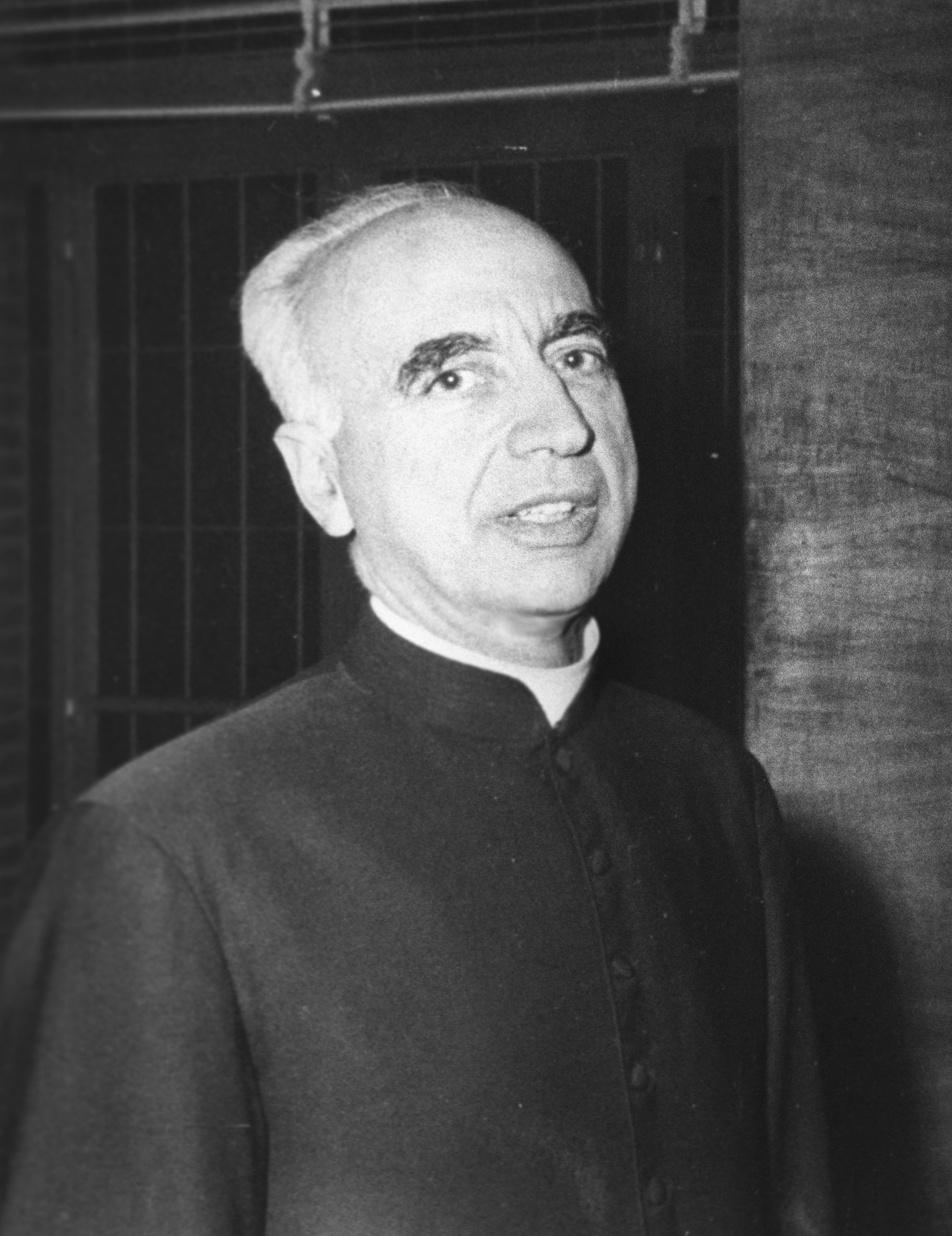
Albareda in September 1960

José María Albareda Herrera (Caspe, 15 April 1902 - 26 February 1966, Madrid) was a Spanish soil scientist and science administrator. In 1939, he founded the Spanish National Research Council (CSIC), the main Spanish scientific institution.

== Biography ==
Albareda trained in Pharmacy and Chemistry at the University of Saragossa, where he worked with Antonio de Gregorio Rocasolano and Antonio Rius Miró, before completing his Phd at the Central University (Madrid). Supported by the Junta para la Ampliación de Estudios e Investigaciones Científicas, he worked at Bonn, Zurich, Königsberg and Rothamsted Experimental Station. In 1935 was appointed to the chair of Agriculture in the Instituto Velázquez of Madrid. In 1940, he obtained the chair of Applied Geology of the Central University.

Alongside José Ibáñez Martín, he founded the Spanish National Research Council (CSIC), servings as its Secretary General for over two decades.

He was one of the first members of the Opus Dei (from 1937) and was a close friend of its founder, Josemaría Escrivá.

He was ordained a priest in 1959. Later, in 1960, he was appointed the first president of the University of Navarra. He died in 1966.

His career included memberships in the Royal Academies of Pharmacy, Sciences and Medicine. In addition, was appointed member of the Pontifical Academy of Sciences by the Pope. Albareda was doctor honoris causa of the Catholic University of Louvain and of the University of Toulouse.
