= Aguaviva =

Aguaviva/ Aiguaviva de Bergantes
- municipality
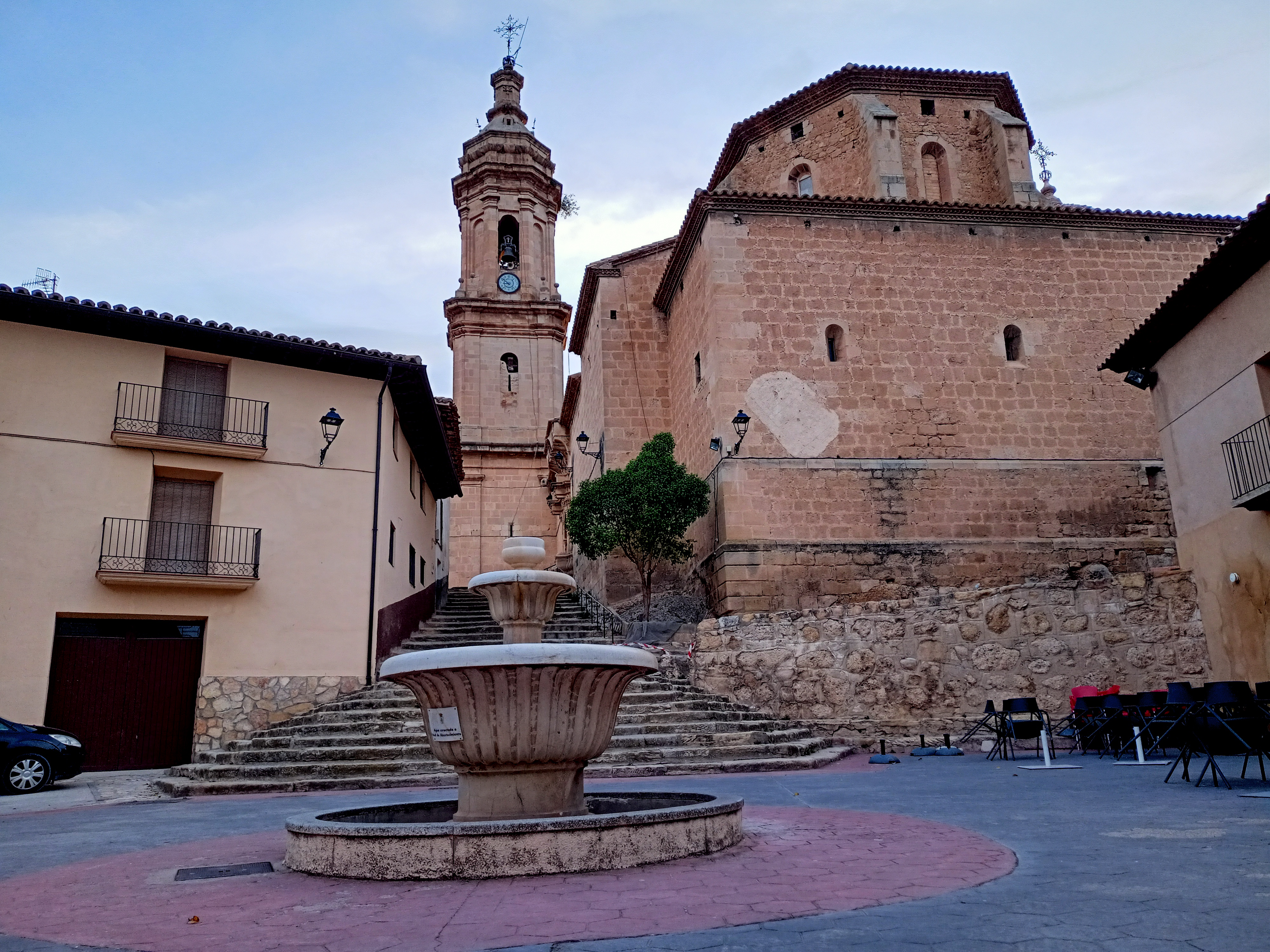

- Flag Coat of arms

- Location of Aguaviva/Aiguaviva de Bergantes within Aragon Location of Aguaviva/Aiguaviva de Bergantes within Spain
- Coordinates: 40°49′N 0°12′W
- Country: Spain
- Autonomous community: Aragon
- Province: Teruel
- Comarca: Bajo Aragón

Area
  - Total: 42.15 km^{2} (16.27 sq mi)
- Elevation: 549 m (1,801 ft)

Population (2025-01-01)
  - Total: 562
  - Density: 13.3/km^{2} (34.5/sq mi)
- Time zone: UTC+1 (CET)
  - Summer (DST): UTC+2 (CEST)

Aguaviva (Spanish: [ˈaɣwaˈβiβa]) or Aiguaviva de Bergantes (Catalan: [ˌajɣwaˈβiβə ðe βeɾˈɣantes]) is a municipality located in the province of Teruel, Aragon, Spain. According to the 2018 census (INE), the municipality had a population of 522 inhabitants.

It is known as Aiguaiva de Bergantes in the local Catalan variety because river Bergantes flows by the eastern end of the town.

Its main monument is the parish church of San Lorenzo, in baroque style, restored after the Spanish Civil War of 1936–39, when its great altarpiece, its heritage and the magnificent pantheon, now empty, were lost. The buildings of two baroque chapels also remain.

== See also ==
- Bajo Aragón
- List of municipalities in Teruel
