= La Mata de los Olmos =

- municipality
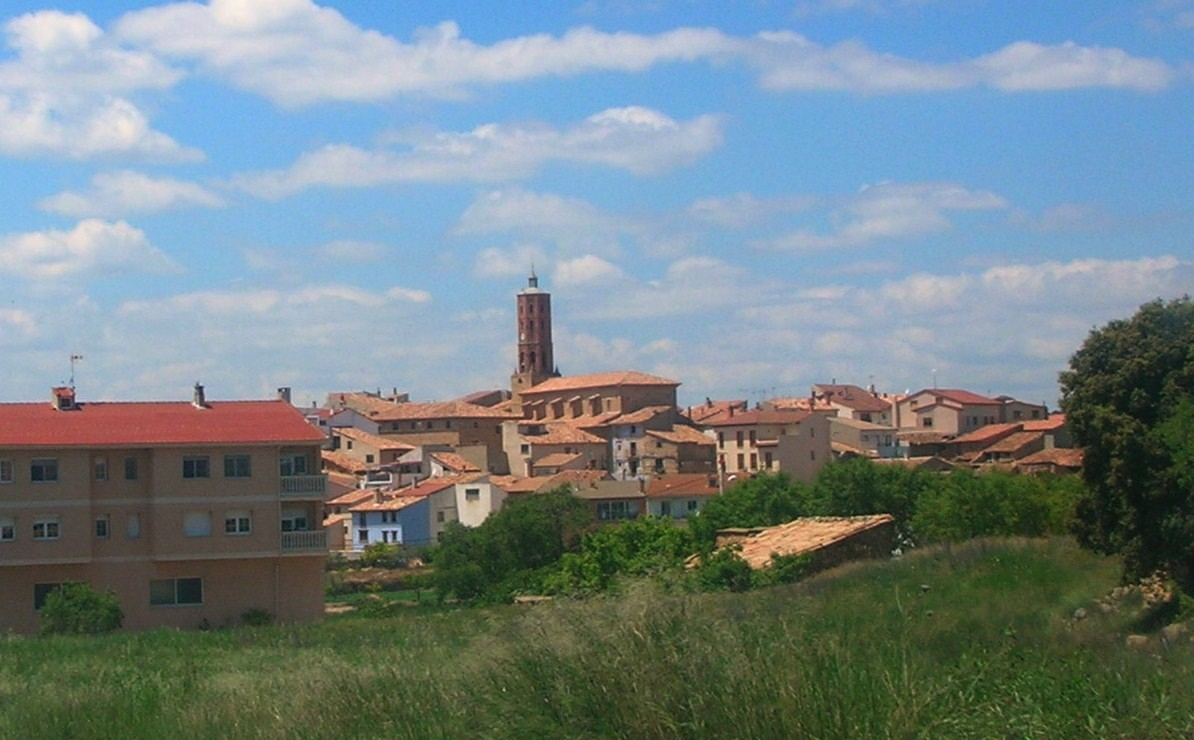

- Flag Coat of arms

- Location within Spain
- Coordinates: 40°52′N 0°31′W
- Country: Spain
- Autonomous community: Aragon
- Province: Teruel
- Comarca: Bajo Aragón

Area
  - Total: 23 km^{2} (8.9 sq mi)
- Elevation: 905 m (2,969 ft)

Population (2025-01-01)
  - Total: 255
  - Density: 11/km^{2} (29/sq mi)
- Time zone: UTC+1 (CET)
  - Summer (DST): UTC+2 (CEST)

La Mata de los Olmos is a municipality located in the Bajo Aragón comarca, province of Teruel, Aragon, Spain. According to the 2018 census the municipality has a population of 265 inhabitants.

Road N-211 crosses the eastern side of La Mata de los Olmos.

== See also ==
- Bajo Aragón
- List of municipalities in Teruel
