= Guadalope =

River in Spain

Coordinates: 41°14′49″N 0°03′29″W

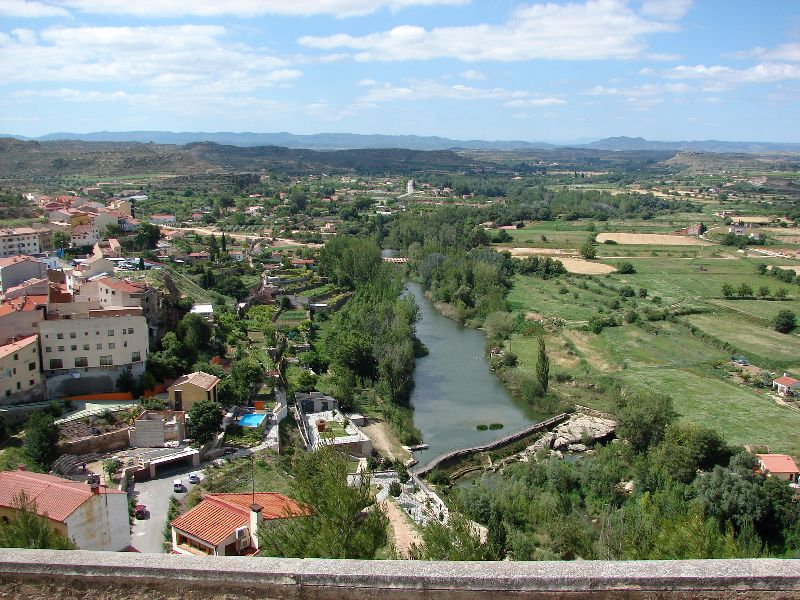
- The Guadalope in Alcañiz

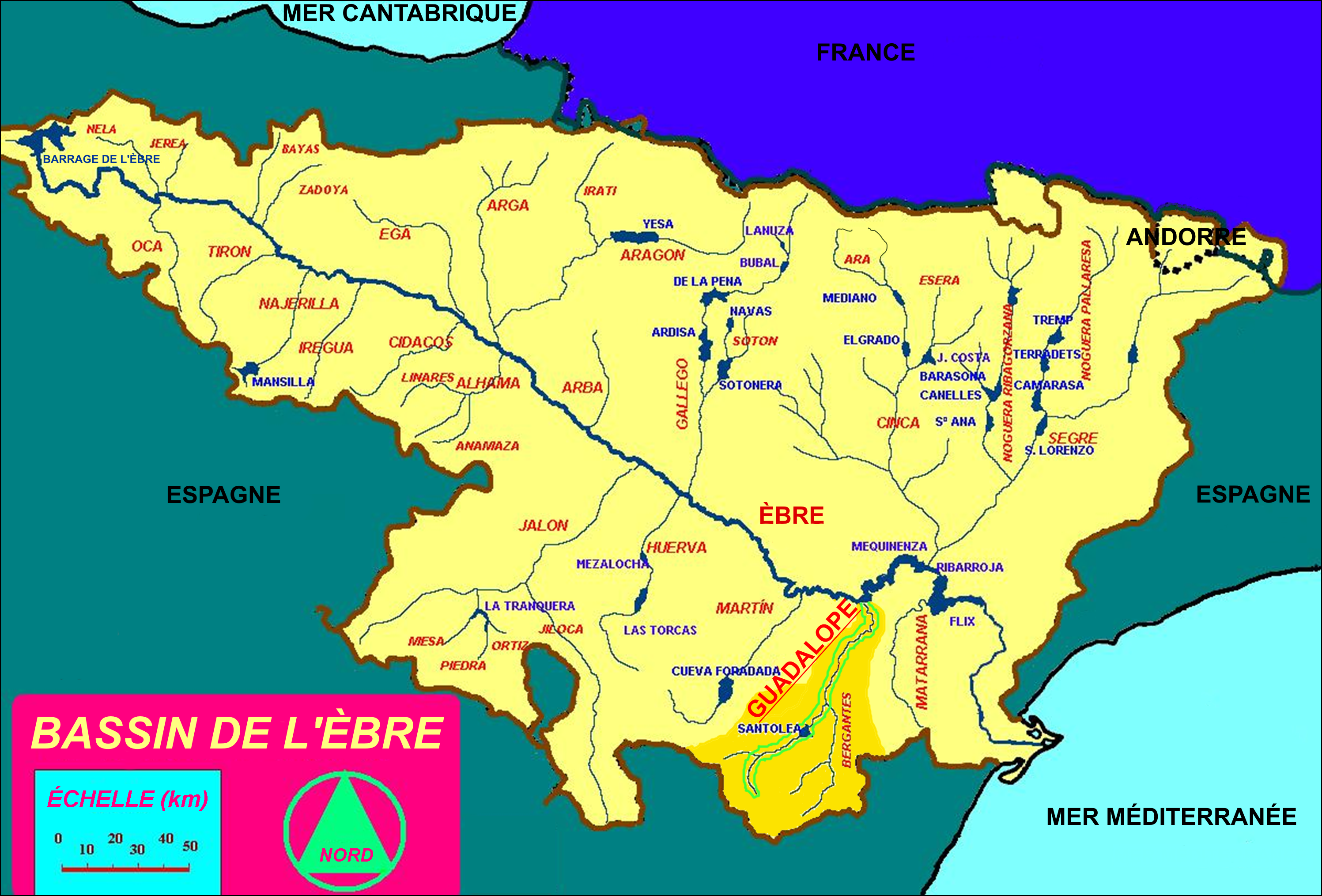
- Watershed of the Guadalope (in dark yellow)

Location
- Country: Spain

Physical characteristics
- Source
  - location: Sierra de Gúdar, Maestrazgo (Aragon)
  - elevation: 2,000 m (6,600 ft)
- Mouth
  - elevation: 117 m (384 ft)
- Length: 160 km (99 mi)
- Basin size: 3,890 km^{2} (1,500 mi^{2})
- Discharge
  - average: 4.83 m^{3}/s (171 cu ft/s)

Basin features
- Progression: Ebro→ Balearic Sea

The Guadalope (Guadalop in Catalan and Aragonese) is a river in Aragon, Spain. It is a tributary of the Ebro (Ebre in Catalan).

== Course ==
This 160-kilometre (99 mi) long river rises in the Sierra de Gúdar, near Villarroya de los Pinares and Miravete de la Sierra in the Maestrazgo, Aragon. It receives water from rivulets originating in the Sierra de la Cañada and Sierra Carrascosa. Flowing northeastwards its waters fill the Santolea reservoir, then the dam of Calanda, before it enters the Ebro at Caspe.

In addition to the towns mentioned, it also flows through Alcañiz and Civan. Tributaries of the Guadalope include the Bergantes, Fortanete, Bordón and Mezquín on the right side, and the Aliaga River and the Guadalopillo on the left.

== See also ==
- List of rivers of Spain
