= Los Olmos =

- municipality
- Location within Spain
- Coordinates: 40°52′N 0°29′W
- Country: Spain
- Autonomous community: Aragon
- Province: Teruel
- Comarca: Bajo Aragón

Area
  - Total: 44 km^{2} (17 sq mi)
- Elevation: 868 m (2,848 ft)

Population (2025-01-01)
  - Total: 111
  - Density: 2.5/km^{2} (6.5/sq mi)
- Time zone: UTC+1 (CET)
  - Summer (DST): UTC+2 (CEST)

Los Olmos is a municipality located in the province of Teruel, Aragon, Spain. According to the 2018 census the municipality has a population of 122 inhabitants.

Los Olmos is located near road N-211 in the Bajo Aragón comarca, south of Alcorisa.

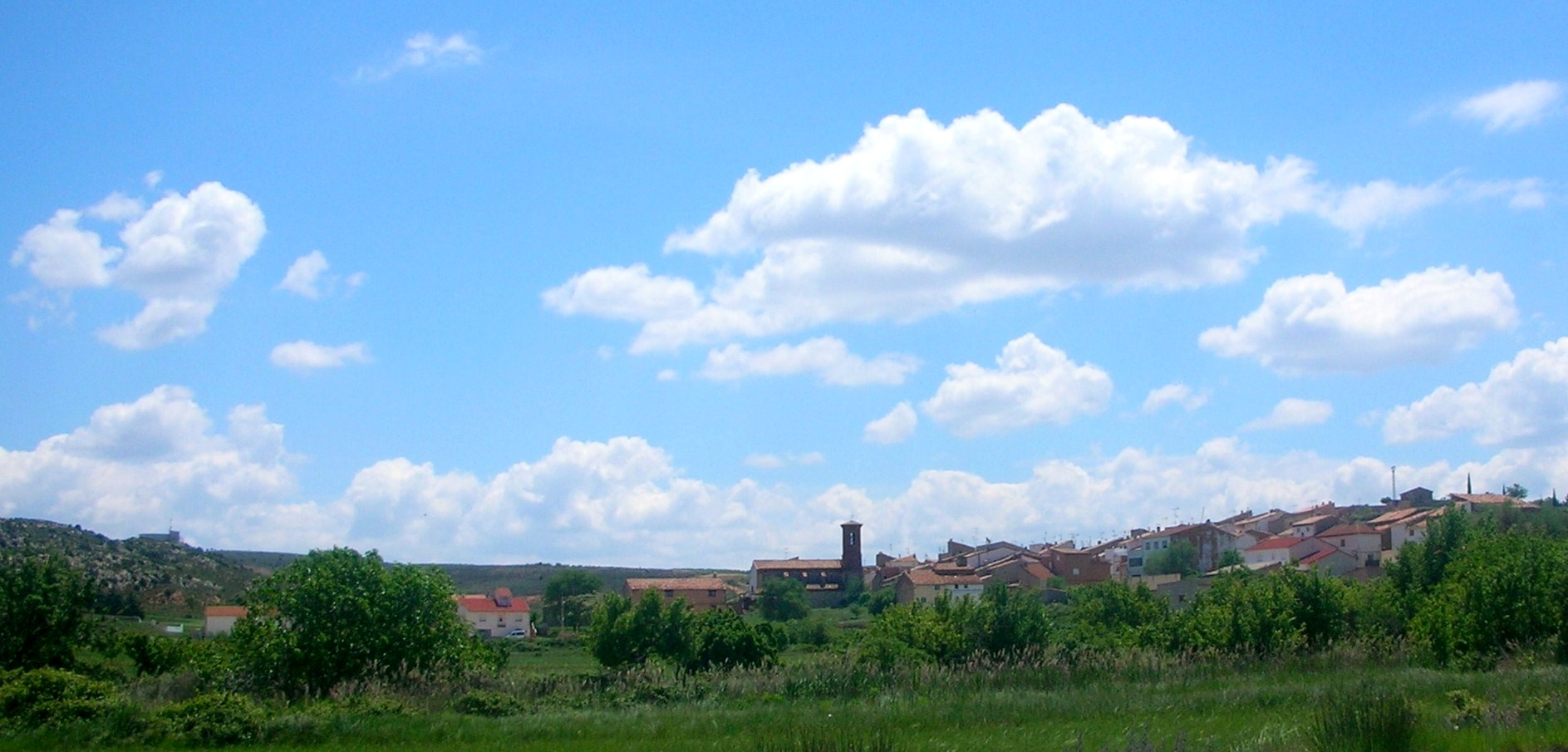
View of Los Olmos

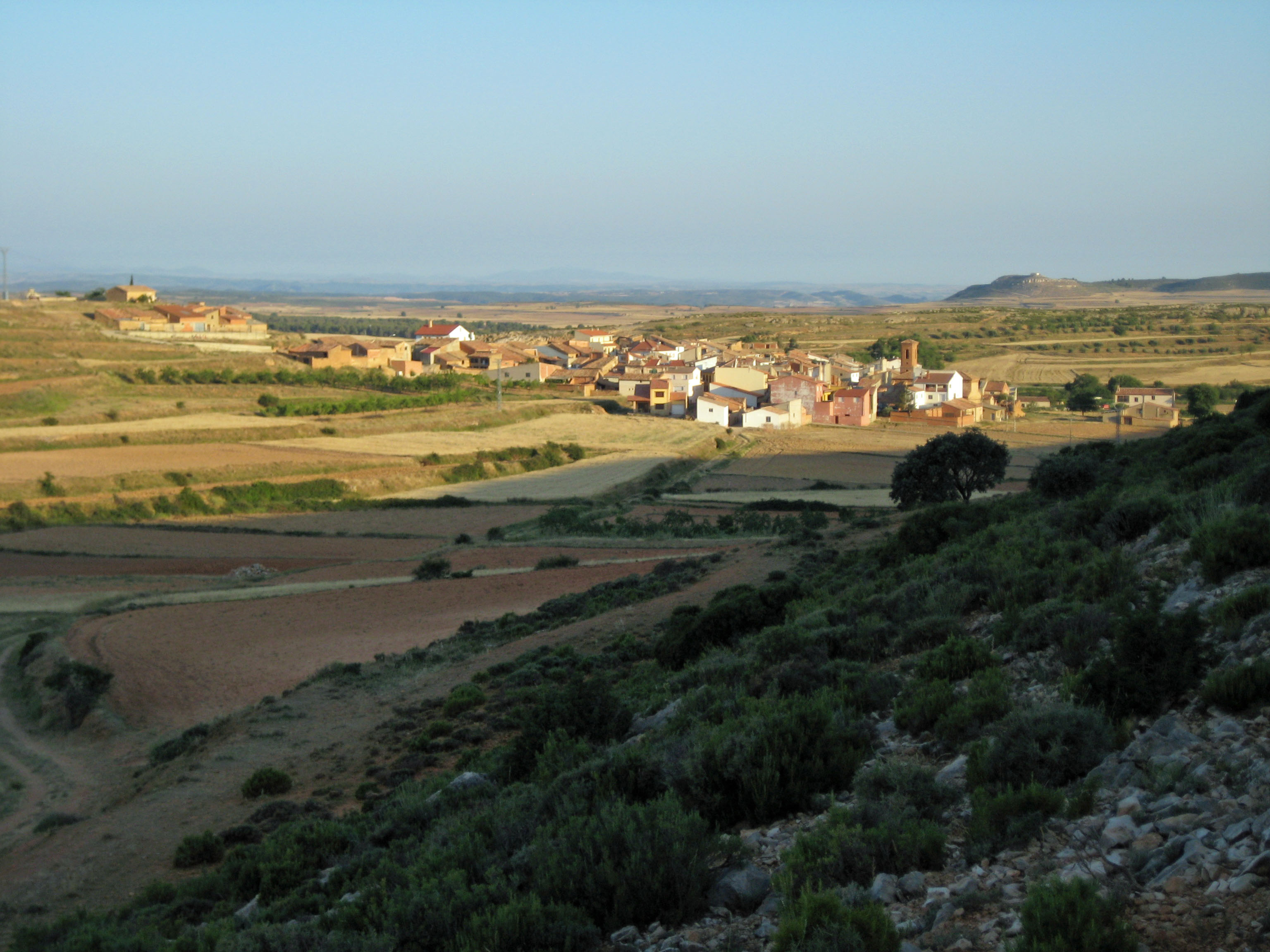

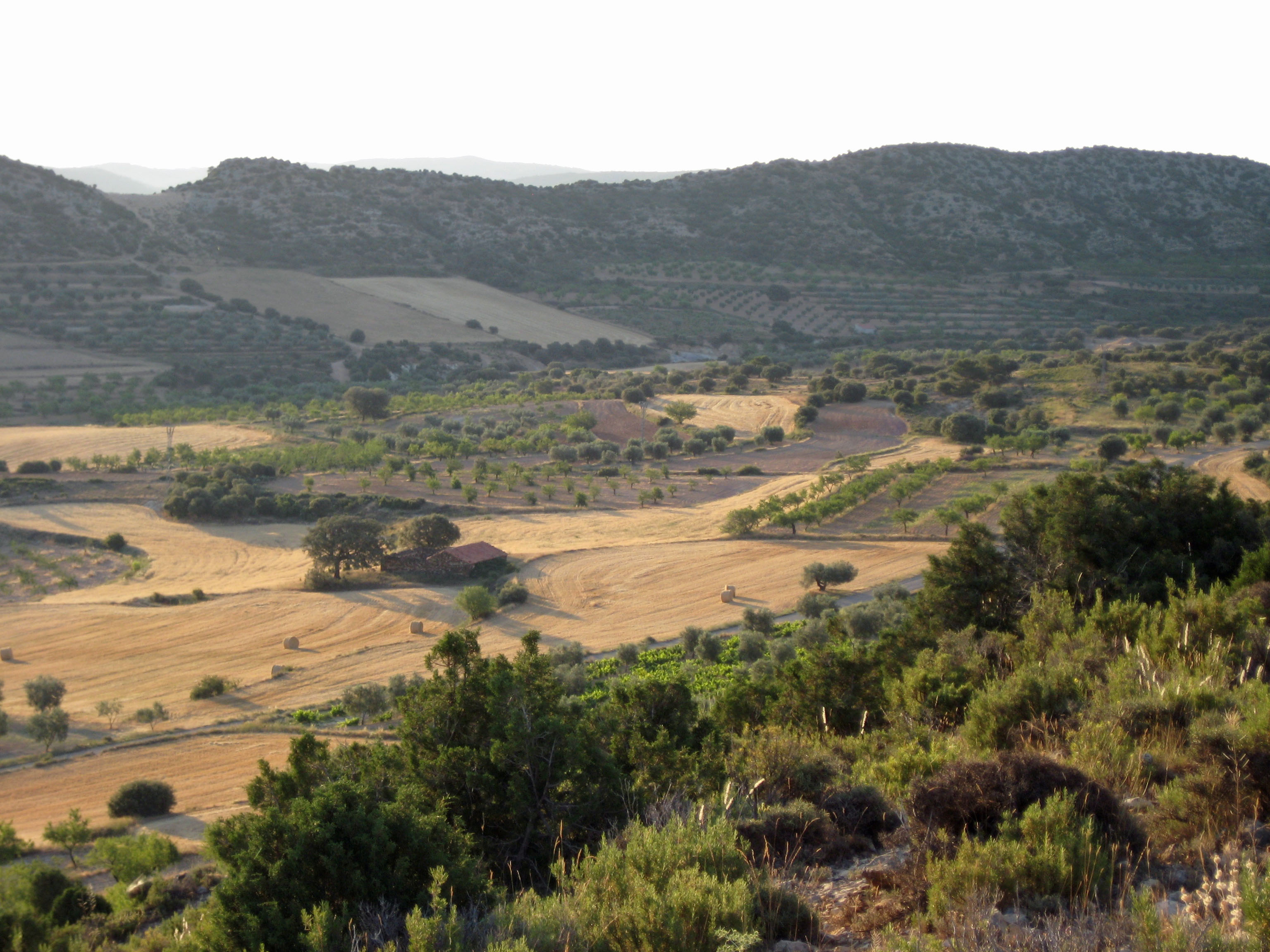

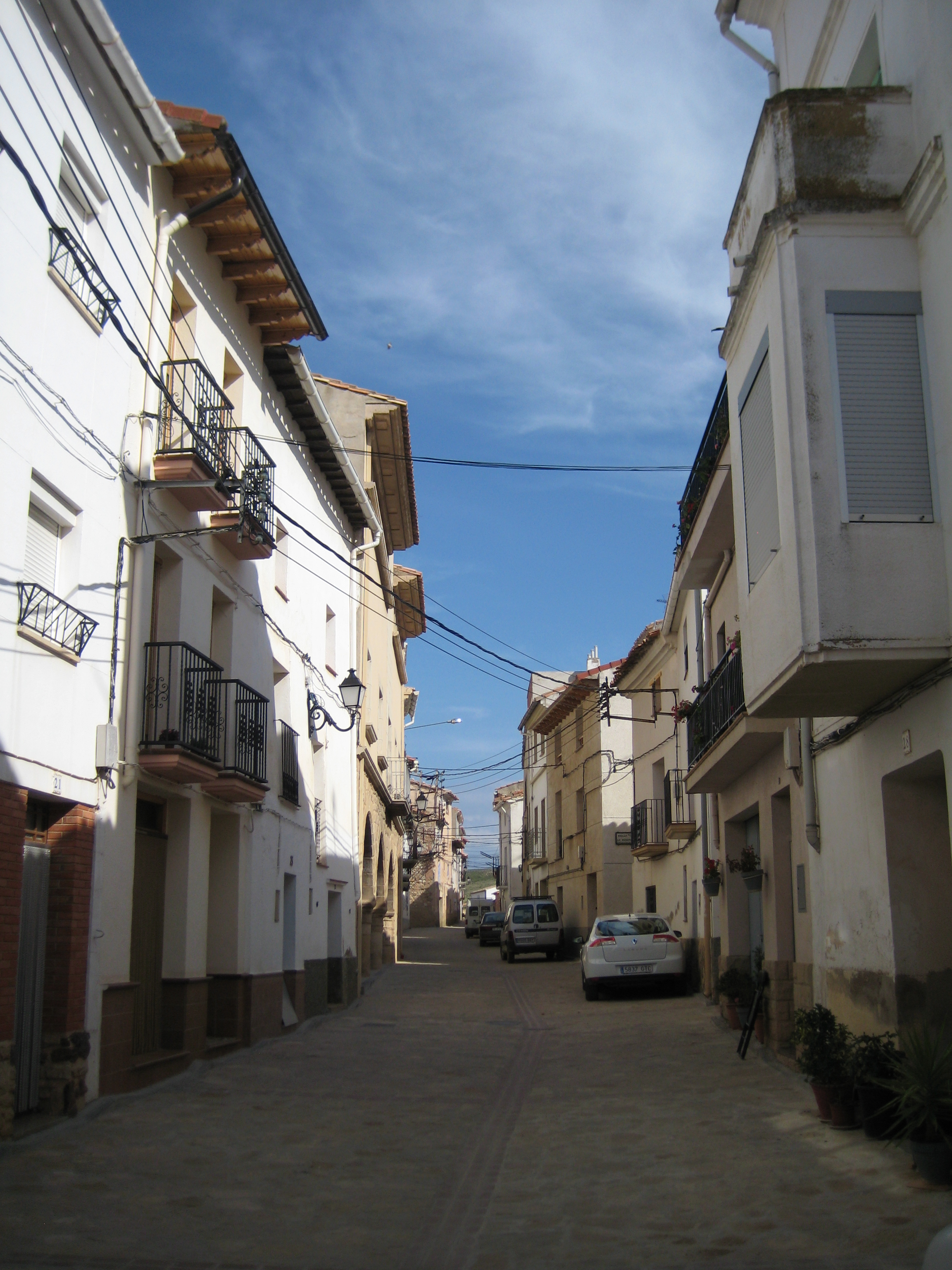

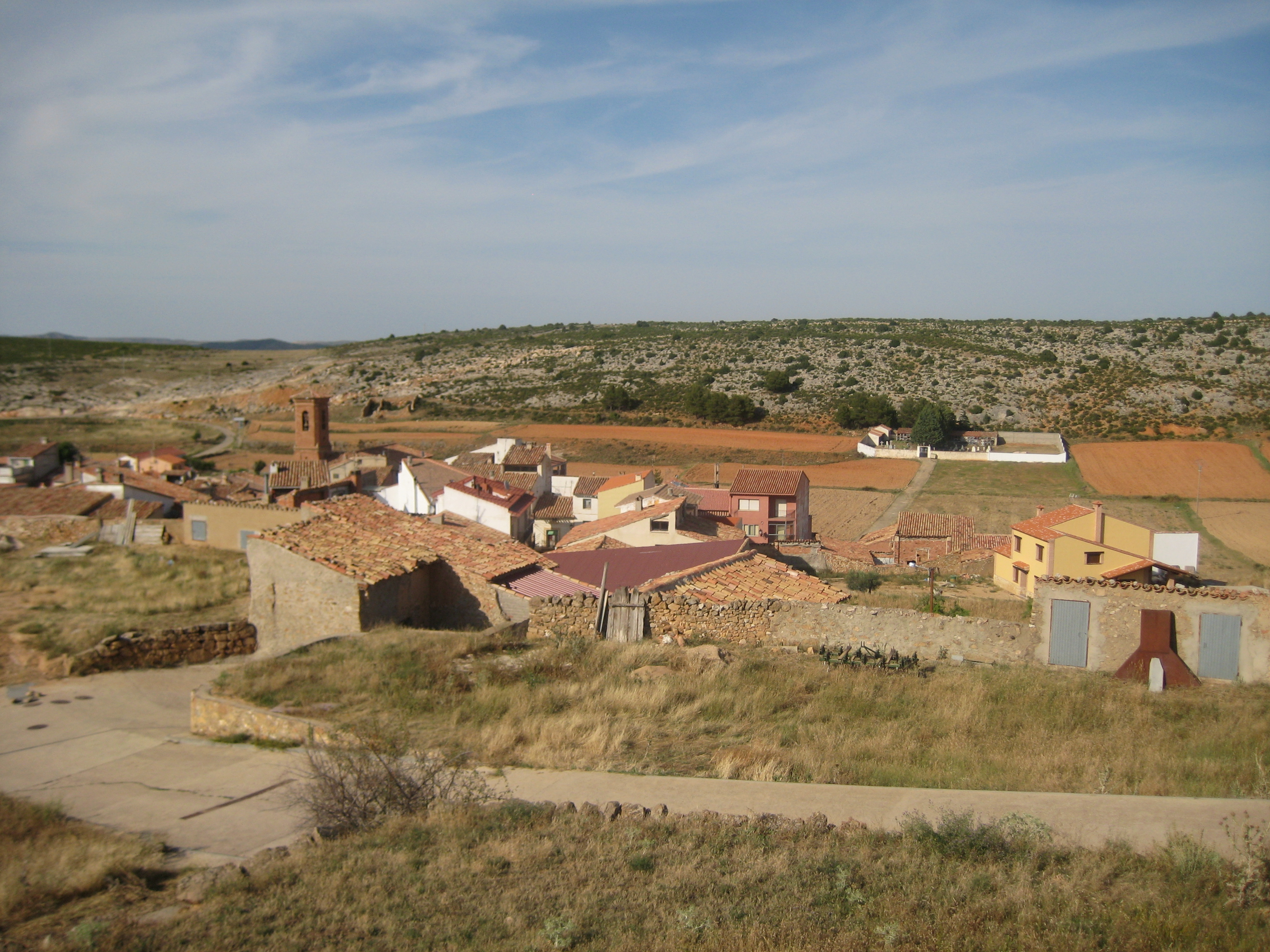

== See also ==
- Bajo Aragón
- List of municipalities in Teruel
