= Foz-Calanda =

Foz-Calanda, Spain
- village
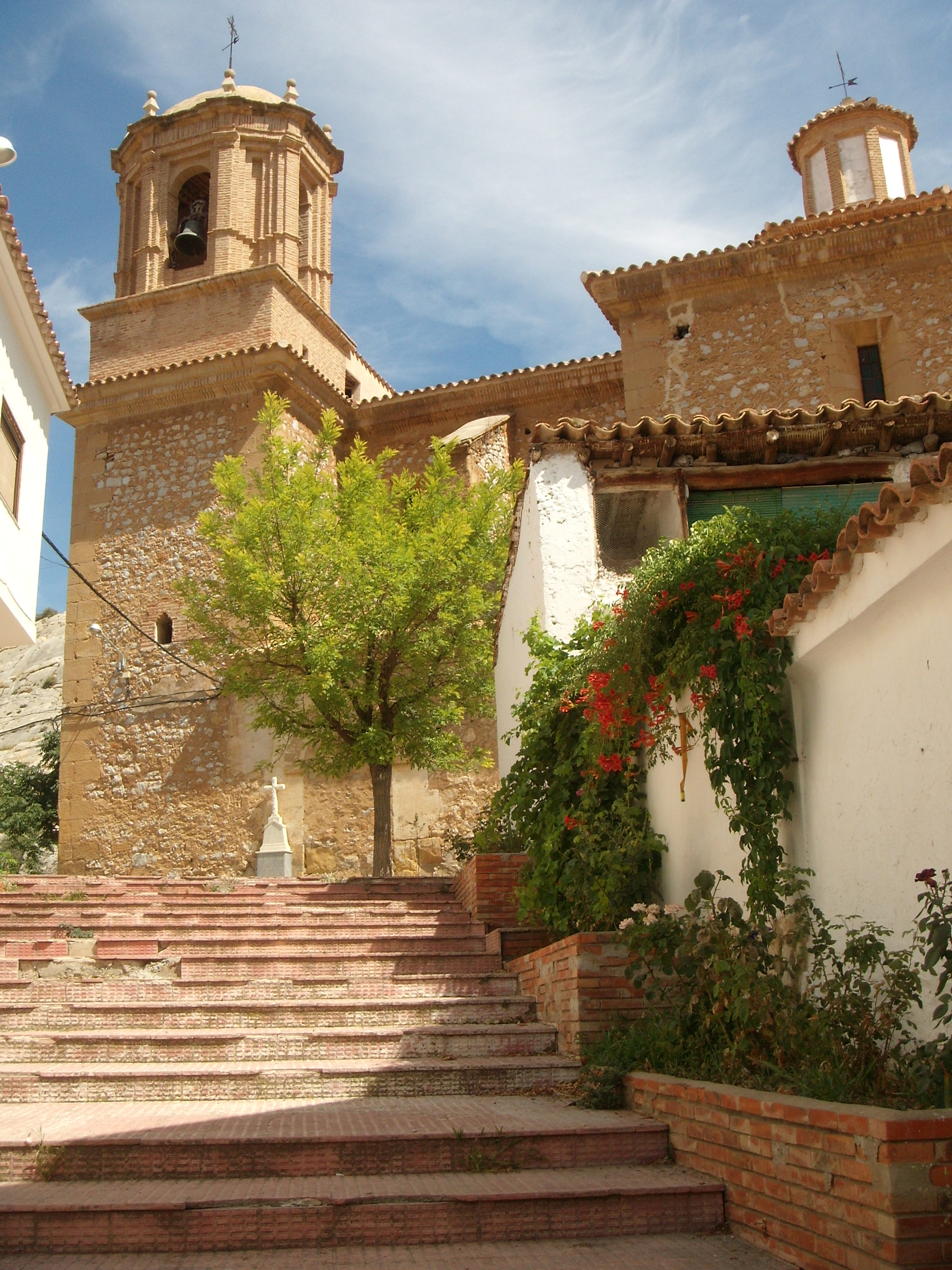
- Foz Calanda ascent to the Church

- Flag Coat of arms

- Location within Spain
- Coordinates: 40°55′N 0°16′W
- Country: Spain
- Autonomous community: Aragon
- Province: Teruel
- Municipality: Foz-Calanda
- Elevation: 496 m (1,627 ft)

Population (2025-01-01)
  - Total: 272
- Time zone: UTC+1 (CET)
  - Summer (DST): UTC+2 (CEST)

Foz-Calanda, also called Foz de Calanda or just Foz, is a town and municipality in the province of Teruel, Aragon, Spain. It has a population of 272 (register office, 2025).

== See also ==
- List of municipalities in Teruel
