= Miravete de la Sierra =

- municipality
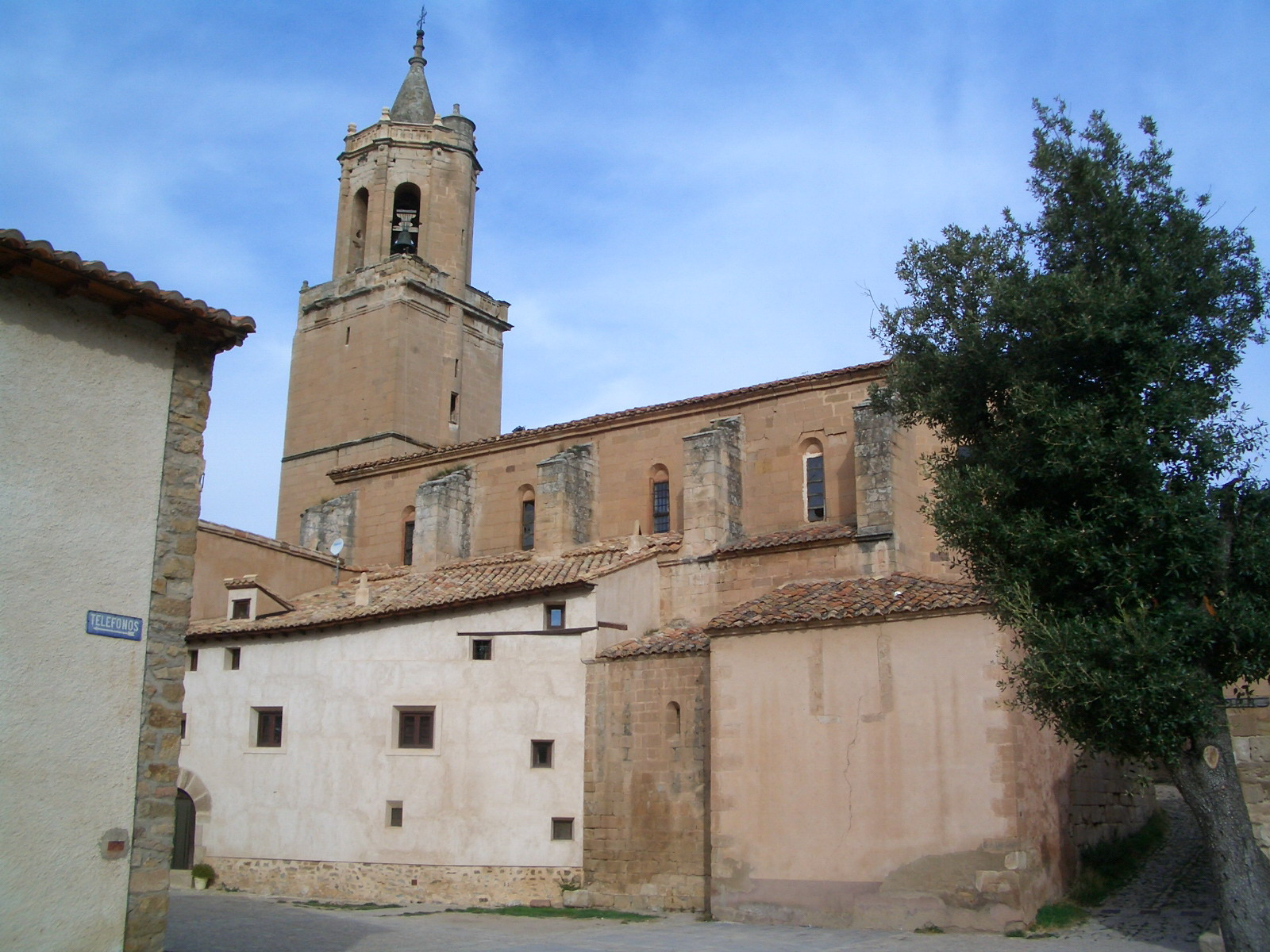

- Flag Coat of arms

- Location within Spain
- Coordinates: 40°35′N 0°42′W
- Country: Spain
- Autonomous community: Aragon
- Province: Teruel
- Municipality: Miravete de la Sierra

Area
  - Total: 36 km^{2} (14 sq mi)
- Elevation: 1,218 m (3,996 ft)

Population (2025-01-01)
  - Total: 31
  - Density: 0.86/km^{2} (2.2/sq mi)
- Time zone: UTC+1 (CET)
  - Summer (DST): UTC+2 (CEST)

Miravete de la Sierra is a municipality located in the province of Teruel, Aragon, Spain. According to the 2004 census (INE), the municipality has a population of 12 inhabitants. However, interviews with local inhabitants establish that the total permanent population in winter is 47 people (according to the 2007 census); while during the summer and other holidays, many more people live there.

== See also ==
- List of municipalities in Teruel
