= Sebastián Cirac Estopañán =

Spanish philologist and linguist

Sebastián Cirac Estopañán (1903–1970) was a Spanish philologist and linguist.
