= Lower Aragon =

Coordinates: 41°25′00″N 0°7′00″W

Lower Aragon Bajo Aragón / Baixo Aragón / Baix Aragó
- Natural region
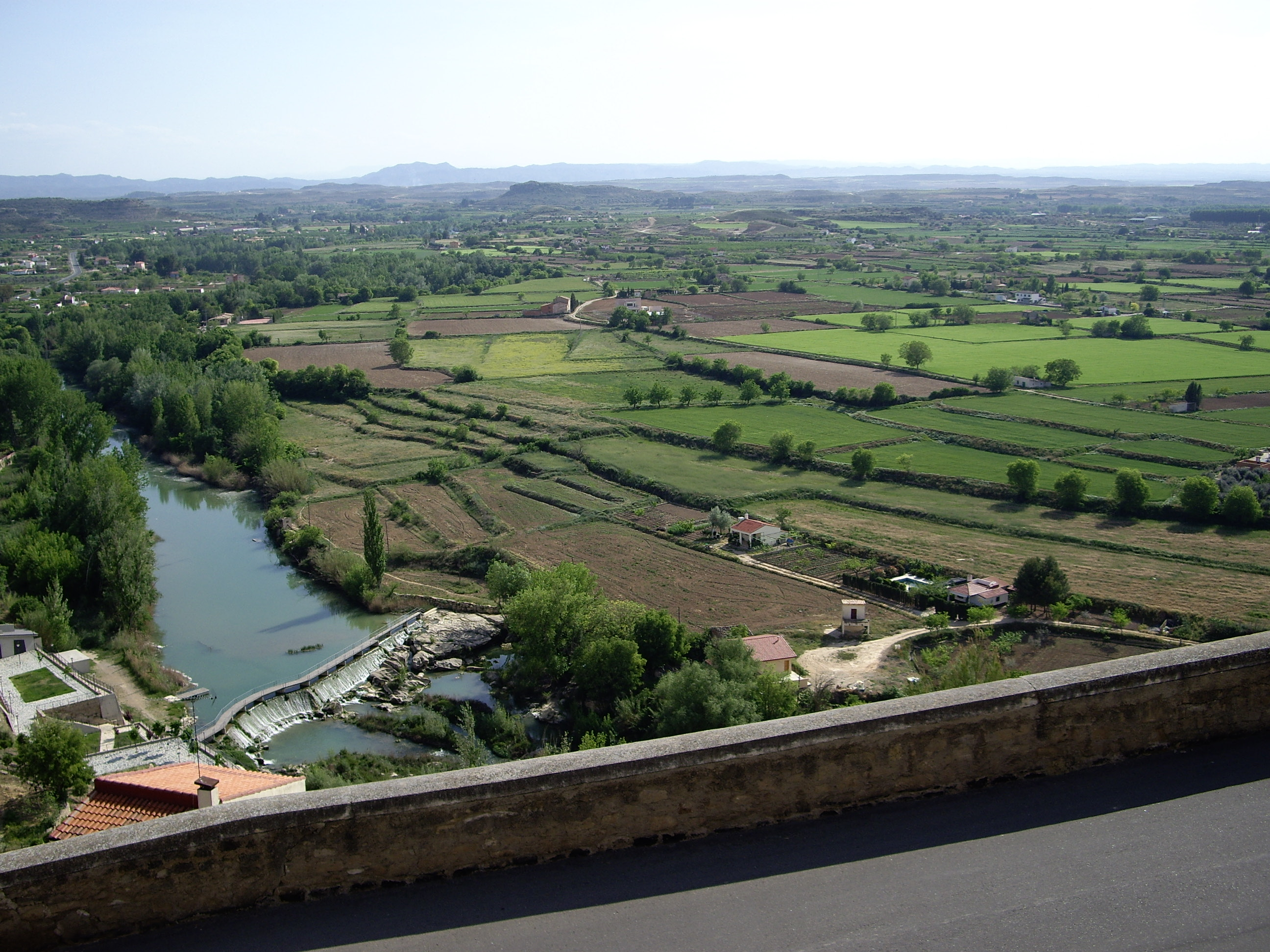
- Landscape near Alcañiz with the Guadalope River in the foreground

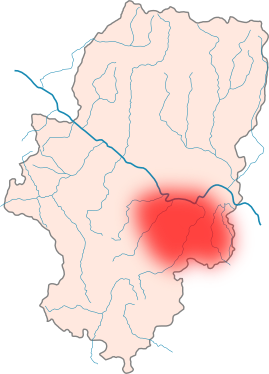
- Approximate location of Lower Aragon within Aragón.
- Countries: Spain

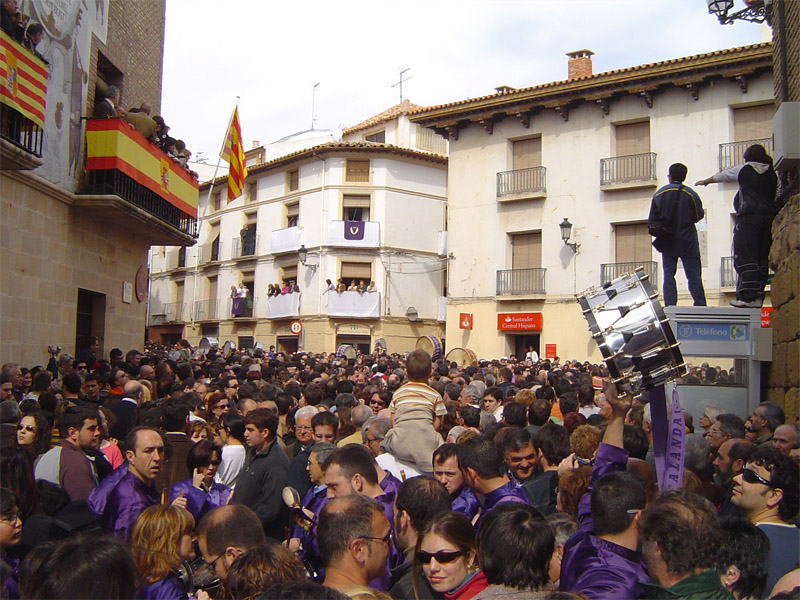
Holy Week celebrations with drums in Calanda.

Lower Aragon (Spanish: Bajo Aragón, Aragonese: Baixo Aragón, Catalan: Baix Aragó), also known as Tierra Baja, is a natural and historical region in Aragon, Spain. The name "Lower Aragon" refers to the areas of the lowest altitude within the Ebro river basin, but the historical region encompasses only the river basins of several right tributaries of the Ebro River, namely the Matarranya, Guadalope, Regallo, Martín and Aguas, located between the Ebro and the Iberian mountain range.

The demonym for Lower Aragonese people is bajoaragonés or tierrabajino. The eastern fringes of the Lower Aragon natural region include some areas belonging as well to the Catalan-speaking strip in eastern Aragon known as La Franja and overlapping the historical Ilercavonia comarca.

All the villages traditionally taking part in the characteristic and loud Drum and Bass drum Route during Holy Week processions are included in Lower Aragon historical region.

== History ==
In 1707, following King Philip's Nueva Planta decrees a large part of Lower Aragon became the Corregimiento de Alcañiz, a kind of large district. In 1812, as a result of Marshal Louis Gabriel Suchet's territorial division, the Province of Alcañiz (Provincia de Alcañiz) briefly unified the Lower Aragon region during French occupation. Since then, and despite the strong identity of its inhabitants, this historical region has not been able to achieve the necessary legal recognition for its administrative development.

After the territorial division of Spain in 1833 there have been attempts to create again a fourth province of Aragon with its capital in Alcañiz. These proposals were based on the limited relationship that the municipal areas of Lower Aragon have had with Teruel, the capital of the province in which most of the historical region of Lower Aragon is presently included.

In 1935, at the time of the Second Spanish Republic there was a feeble attempt to segregate the municipalities surrounding Alcañiz and Híjar from the Province of Teruel and merge them with Zaragoza Province. But so far the proposals to make a province out of the Lower Aragon region have not found much echo and the area finds itself in a state of administrative and economical neglect reflected in the A-68 highway issue.

=== Present-day status ===
Lower Aragon was divided into the smaller administrative comarcas after the official delimitation of the Comarcas of Aragon in 1999. Its historical limits fall now within the Bajo Aragón, Bajo Aragón-Caspe, Bajo Martín, Andorra-Sierra de Arcos, Matarranya and Ribera Baja del Ebro comarcas, as well as some municipal terms of the Maestrazgo, Campo de Belchite, Bajo Cinca and Cuencas Mineras comarcas.

Since the current Bajo Aragón administrative division is only a small fraction of the historical territory, the name Bajo Aragón histórico is now commonly used in order to distinguish it from the homonymous small comarca.

== See also ==
- Bajo Aragón
- Comarcas of Aragón
- 1833 territorial division of Spain
