= Bergantes (river) =

River in Spain

Coordinates: 40.863°N 0.2098°W

Bergantes River
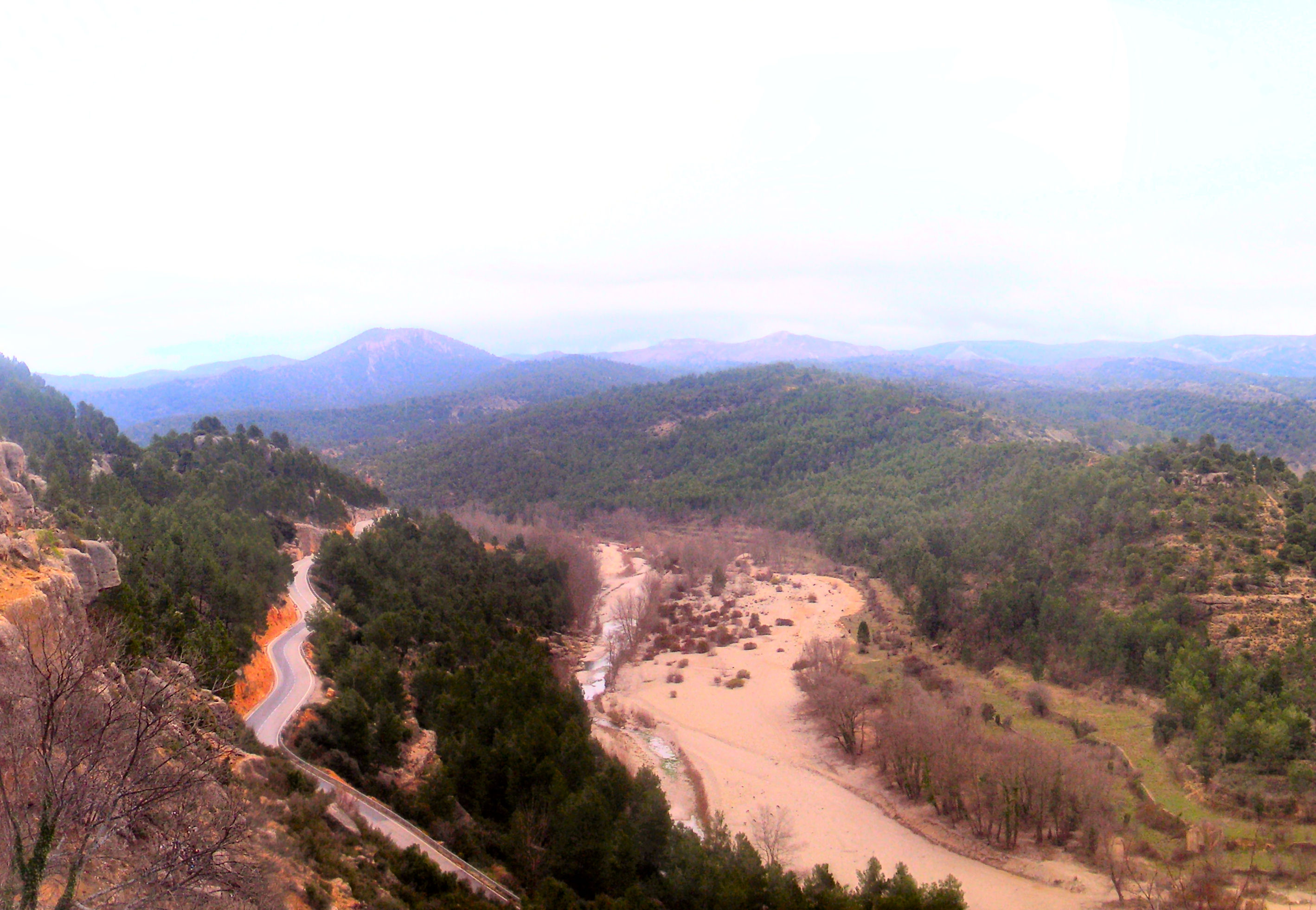
- The Bergantes near the Sanctuary of La Balma, Zorita del Maestrazgo

Location
- Country: Spain

Physical characteristics
- Source
  - elevation: 1,293 m (4,242 ft)
- Mouth
  - elevation: 150 m (490 ft)
- Length: 60 km (37 mi)

Basin features
- Progression: Guadalope→ Ebro→ Balearic Sea
- River system: Ebro
- Tributaries
  - left: Calders, Cantavieja

The Bergantes is a short river in Spain, in the Valencian and Aragon Communities, which rises in the comarca of el Ports (Castellón), 12.5 kilometres (7.8 mi) SSE of Morella. It is the only river in Valencia which forms part of the Ebro basin.

== Geography ==
Although its course is not long (approximately 60 kilometres (37 mi)) and it has a relatively small basin, it has a strong flow during the winter, due to heavy rainfall in the headwater area, situated in the shadow of the mountainous area to the north. The river Cantavieja and the river Calders, which rise in Teruel province, join the Bergantes at the pueblo of Forcall. The Bergantes joins the Guadalope just before the reservoir at Calanda.

== Ecology ==
The river has a diverse flora and fauna, including trout, crayfish and otters.

The watershed of the Bergantes.

== See also ==
- List of rivers of Spain
