= Aragon =

Autonomous community of Spain

Aragon Aragón (Spanish) Aragón (Aragonese) Aragó (Catalan)
- Autonomous community
- Flag Coat of arms
- Anthem: Himno de Aragón (officially)
- Location of Aragon in Spain
- Interactive map of Aragon
- Coordinates: 41°00′N 1°00′W
- Country: Spain
- Capital: Zaragoza
- Provinces: Huesca, Teruel, and Zaragoza

Government
  - President: Jorge Azcón (PP)
  - Legislature: Cortes of Aragon

Area
  - Total: 47,739.65 km^{2} (18,432.38 sq mi)
  - Rank: 4th in Spain
- 9.4% of Spain

Population (2025)
  - Total: 1,364,621
  - Rank: 11th in Spain
  - Density: 28.58465/km^{2} (74.03389/sq mi)
- 2.8% of Spain
- Demonym: Aragonese

GDP
  - Total: €49.635 billion (2024)
  - Per capita: €36,389 (2024)
- Time zone: UTC+1 (CET)
  - Summer (DST): UTC+2 (CEST)
- ISO 3166 code: ES-AR
- Official languages: Spanish
- Recognised languages: Aragonese • Catalan
- Statute of Autonomy: 16 August 1982; 18 April 2007 (current version)
- National day: 23 April
- Congress seats: 13 (of 350)
- Senate seats: 14 (of 265)
- HDI (2022): 0.915 very high · 7th
- Website: Gobierno de Aragón

Aragon (/ˈærəɡən/ ARR-ə-gən, US also /-ɡɒn, -ɡoʊn/ -gon, -gohn; Spanish and Aragonese: Aragón [aɾaˈɣon]; Catalan: Aragó [əɾəˈɣo]) is an autonomous community in Spain, coextensive with the medieval Kingdom of Aragon. In northeastern Spain, the Aragonese autonomous community comprises three provinces (from north to south): Huesca, Zaragoza, and Teruel. Its capital is Zaragoza. The current Statute of Autonomy declares Aragon a historic nationality of Spain.

Covering an area of 47,739.65 km^{2} (18,432.38 sq mi), the region's terrain ranges diversely from permanent glaciers to verdant valleys, rich pasture lands and orchards, through to the arid steppes of the central lowlands. Aragon is home to many rivers—most notably, the river Ebro, Spain's largest river in volume, which runs west–east across the entire region through the province of Zaragoza. It is also home to the highest mountains of the Pyrenees.

As of 2025, the population of Aragon was 1,364,621, with slightly over half living in the capital city, Zaragoza. In 2023, the economy of Aragon generated a GDP of €46,674 million, which represents 3.1% of Spain's national GDP, and is currently 5th in per capita production behind Madrid, Basque Country, Navarre and Catalonia.

In addition to its three provinces, Aragon is subdivided into 33 comarcas or counties. All comarcas of Aragon have a rich geopolitical and cultural history from its pre-Roman, Celtic and Roman days, four centuries of Islamic rule as Marca Superior of Al-Andalus or kingdom (or taifa) of Saraqusta, as lands that once belonged to the Frankish Marca Hispanica, counties that later formed the Kingdom of Aragon, and eventually the Crown of Aragon.

== History ==
Aragon, occupying the northeast of the Iberian Peninsula, has served as a bridge between the Mediterranean Sea, the peninsular center, and the coasts of the Cantabrian Sea. The human presence in the lands that today form the autonomous community dates back several millennia, but present-day Aragon, like many of the current historical nationalities, was formed during the Middle Ages.

=== Prehistory ===
Paleolithic in Aragon

The oldest testimonies of human life in the lands that today make up Aragon go back to the time of the glaciations, in the Pleistocene, some 600000 years ago. This population left the Acheulean industry that found its best weapons in the hand axes of flint or the cleavers of quartzite.

In the Upper Palaeolithic appeared two new cultures: Solutrean and Magdalenian.

The Epipaleolithic was centered in Lower Aragon, occupying the epoch between the 7th and the 5th millennium.

In the first half of the 5th millennium BCE, Neolithic remains are found in the Huescan Outer Ranges (Spanish: Rangos Exteriores) and in Lower Aragon.

The Eneolithic was characterized in the province of Huesca, presenting two important megalithic nuclei: the Pre-Pyrenees of the Outer Ranges and the High Pyrenean valleys.

The Late Bronze Age began in Aragon around 1100 BCE with the arrival of the Urnfield culture. They are Indo-European people, with an alleged origin in Central Europe, who incinerate their dead by placing the ashes in a funeral urn. There are examples in the Cave del Moro of Olvena, the Masada del Ratón in Fraga, Palermo, and the Cabezo de Monleón in Caspe.

From the metallurgical point of view, there seems to be a boom given the increase in foundry molds that are located in the population.

The Iron Age is the most important, since throughout the centuries it has been the true substratum of the Aragonese historical population.

The arrival of Central Europeans during the Bronze Age by Pyrenees until reaching the Lower Aragon area, is supposed to have made an important ethnic contribution that prepared the way to the invasions of the Iron Age.

=== Ancient history ===
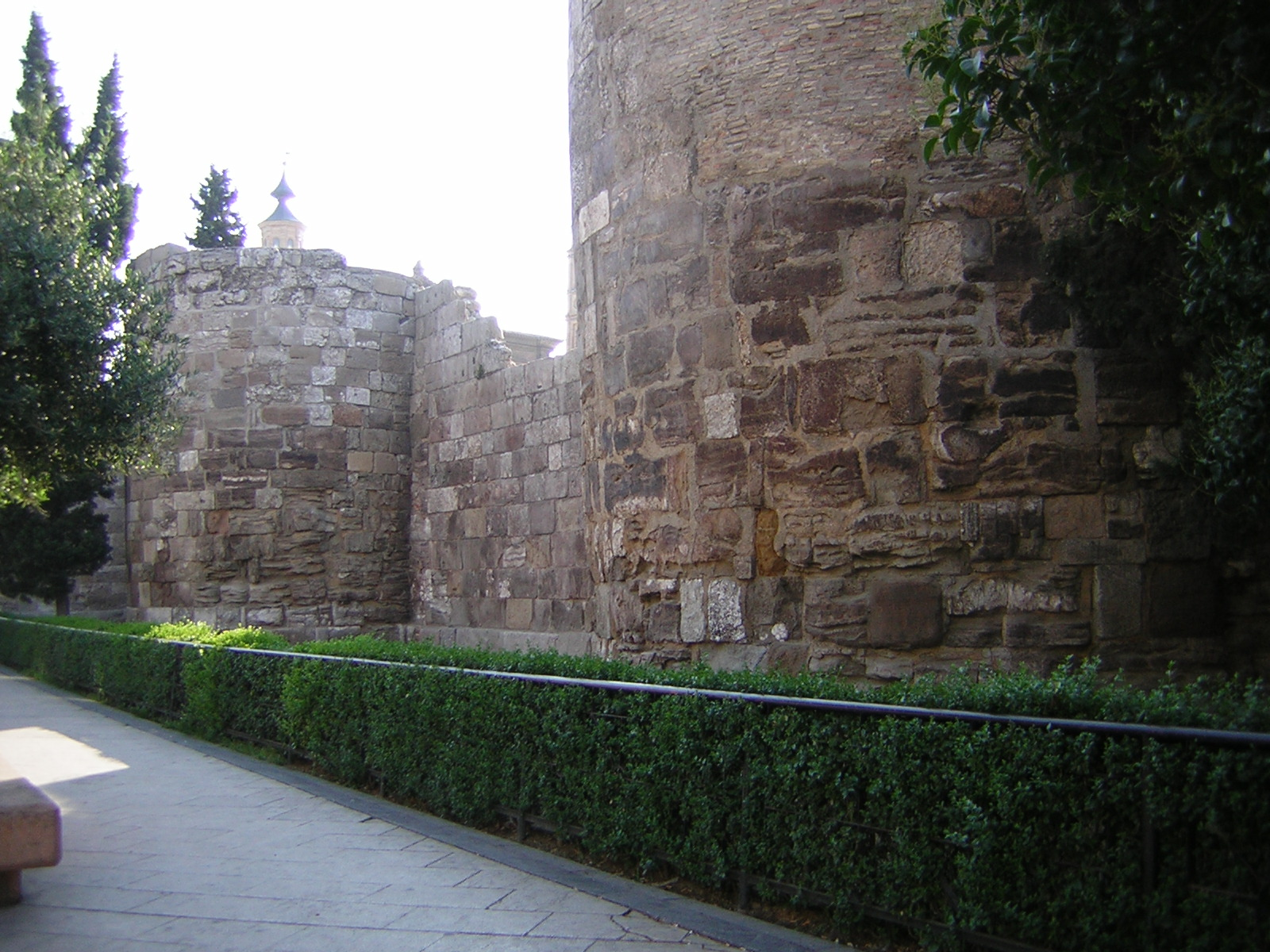
The remains of the Roman walls of Zaragoza

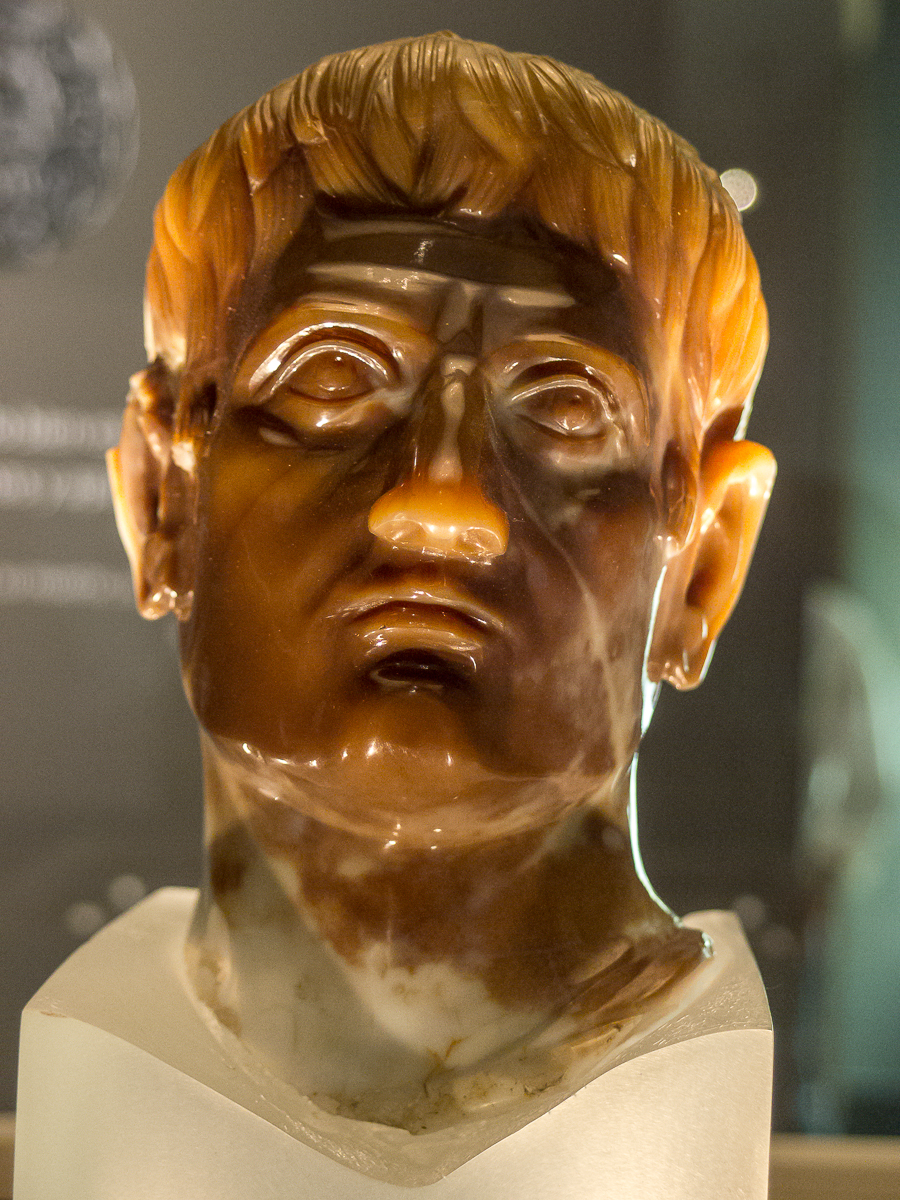
Bust of Augustus found in Tarazona

The Mediterranean contributions represented a commercial activity that will constitute a powerful stimulus for the iron metallurgy, promoting the modernization of the tools and the indigenous armament, replacing the old bronze with iron. There is presence of Phoenician, Greek and Etruscan products.

In the 6th century BCE, there were six groups with different social organization: Vascones, Suessetani, Sedetani, Iacetani, Ilergetes and Citerior Celtiberians.

They are Iberized groups with a tendency towards stability, fixing their habitat in durable populations, with dwellings that evolve towards more enduring and stable models. There are many examples in Aragon, among them Cabezo de Monleón in Caspe, Puntal of Fraga, Roquizal del Rullo or Loma de los Brunos.

The type of social organization was based on the family group, consisting of four generations. Self-sufficient societies in which the greater part of the population was dedicated to agricultural and livestock activities. In the Iberian scope, the power was monarchical, exercised by a king; there was a democratic assembly with participation of the male population.

There were visible social differentiations and established legal-political statutes.

The Romans arrived and progressed easily into the interior.

In the territorial distribution that Rome made of Hispania, the current Aragon was included in the Hispania Citerior. In the year 197 BCE, Sempronius Tuditanus was the praetor of the Citerior and had to face a general uprising in their territories that ended with the Roman defeat and the own death of Tuditanus. In view of these facts, the Senate sent the consul Marcus Porcius Cato with an army of 60000 men. The indigenous peoples of the area were rebelling, except for the Ilergetes who negotiated peace with Cato.

There were different uprisings of the Iberian peoples against the Romans. In 194 BCE, a general uprising with the elimination of half of the Roman army, in 188 BCE, Manlius Acidinus Fulvianus, praetor of the Citerior, must confront the Celtiberians in Calagurris (Calahorra) with the Celtiberians. In 184 BCE, Terentius Varro did it with the Suessetani, to those who took the capital, Corbio.

In the 1st century BCE, Aragon was the scene of the civil war to seize the power of Rome, where the governor Quintus Sertorius made Osca (Huesca) the capital of all the territories controlled by them.

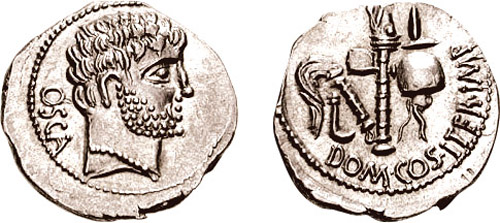
Denarius silver from Huesca

Already in the 1st century BCE, the today Aragonese territory became part of the province Tarraconensis, and there was the definitive romanization of it, creating roads and consolidating ancient Celtiberian and Iberian cities such as Caesaraugusta (Zaragoza), Turiaso (Tarazona), Osca (Huesca) or Bilbilis (Calatayud).

In the middle of the 3rd century, the decay of the Roman Empire began. Between the years 264 and 266, the Franks and the Alemanni, two Germanic peoples who passed through the Pyrenees and came to Tarazona, which they sacked. In the agony of the Empire, groups of bandits emerged who were dedicated to pillage. The Ebro Valley was ravaged in the 5th century by several gangs of evildoers called Bagaudae.

=== Middle Ages ===
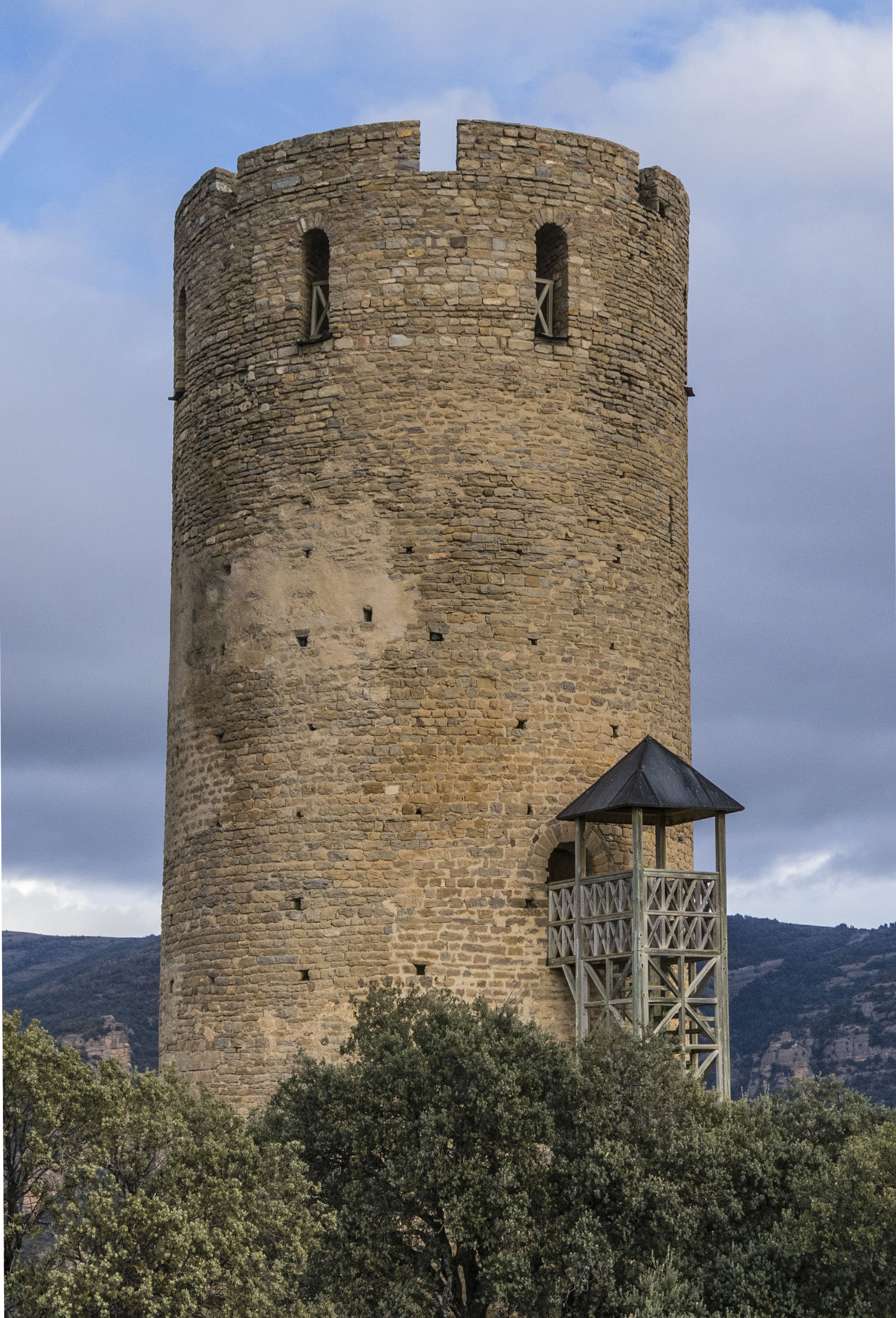
Castle of Fantova, 10th century Christian fortification, (La Puebla de Fantova, Graus)

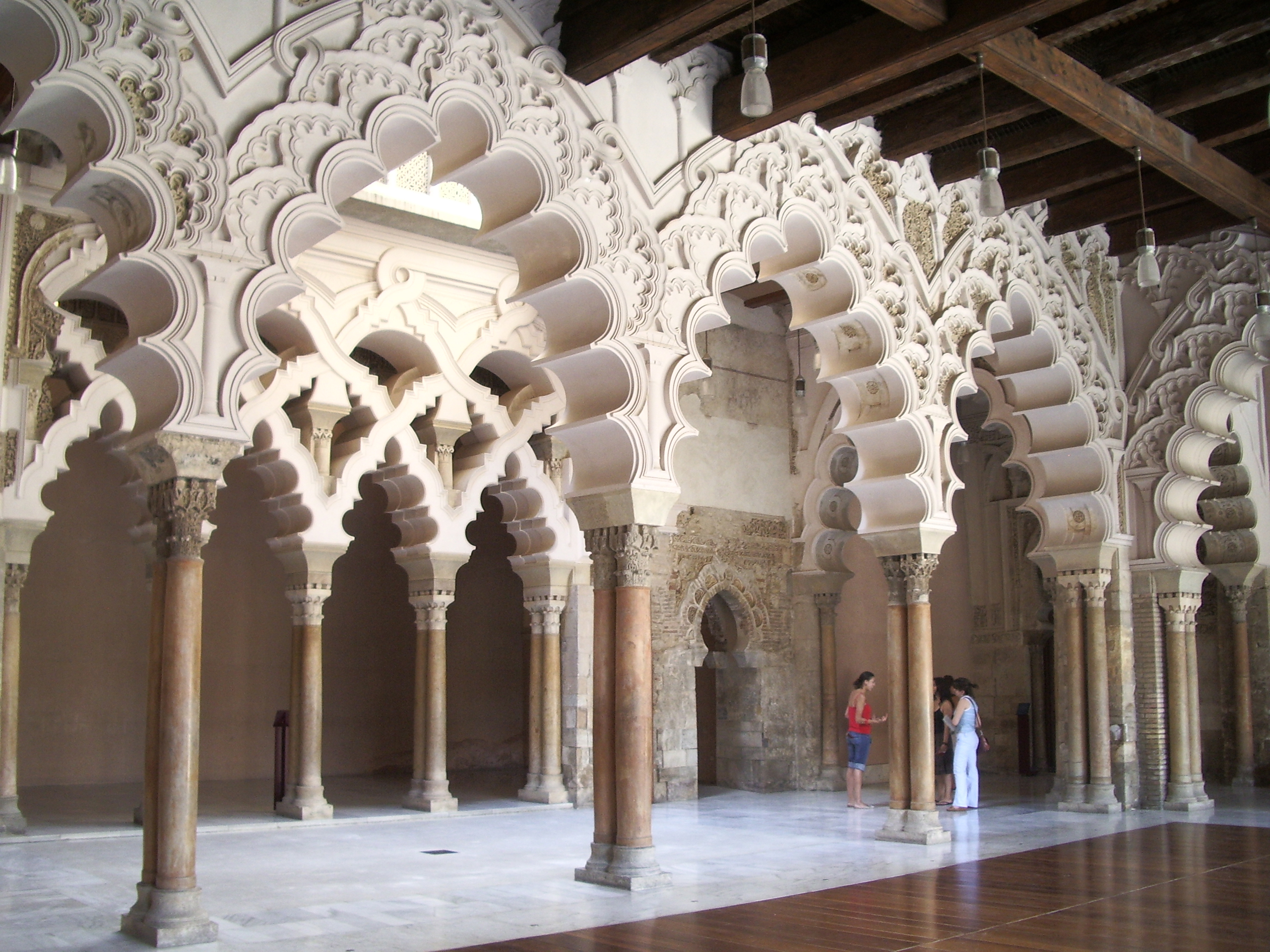
The Aljafería, of the 11th century, was residence of the Banu Hud kings of the Taifa of Saraqusta.

After the disintegration of the Western Roman Empire, the current area of Aragon was occupied by the Visigoths, forming the Visigothic Kingdom.

In the year 714, muslims from North Africa conquered the central area of Aragon, converting to Islam the ancient Roman cities such as Saraqusta (Zaragoza) or Wasqa (Huesca). It was at this time that an important Muwallad family arose, the Banu Qasi (بنو قاسي), whose domains were located in the Ebro Valley between the 8th and 10th centuries. After the disappearance of the Caliphate of Córdoba at the beginning of the 11th century, the Taifa of Zaragoza arose, one of the most important Taifas of Al-Andalus, leaving a great artistic, cultural and philosophical legacy.

The name of Aragon is documented for the first time during the Early Middle Ages in the year 828, when the small County of Aragon of Frankish origin would emerge between the rivers that bear its name, the Aragón river, and its brother the Aragón Subordán river.

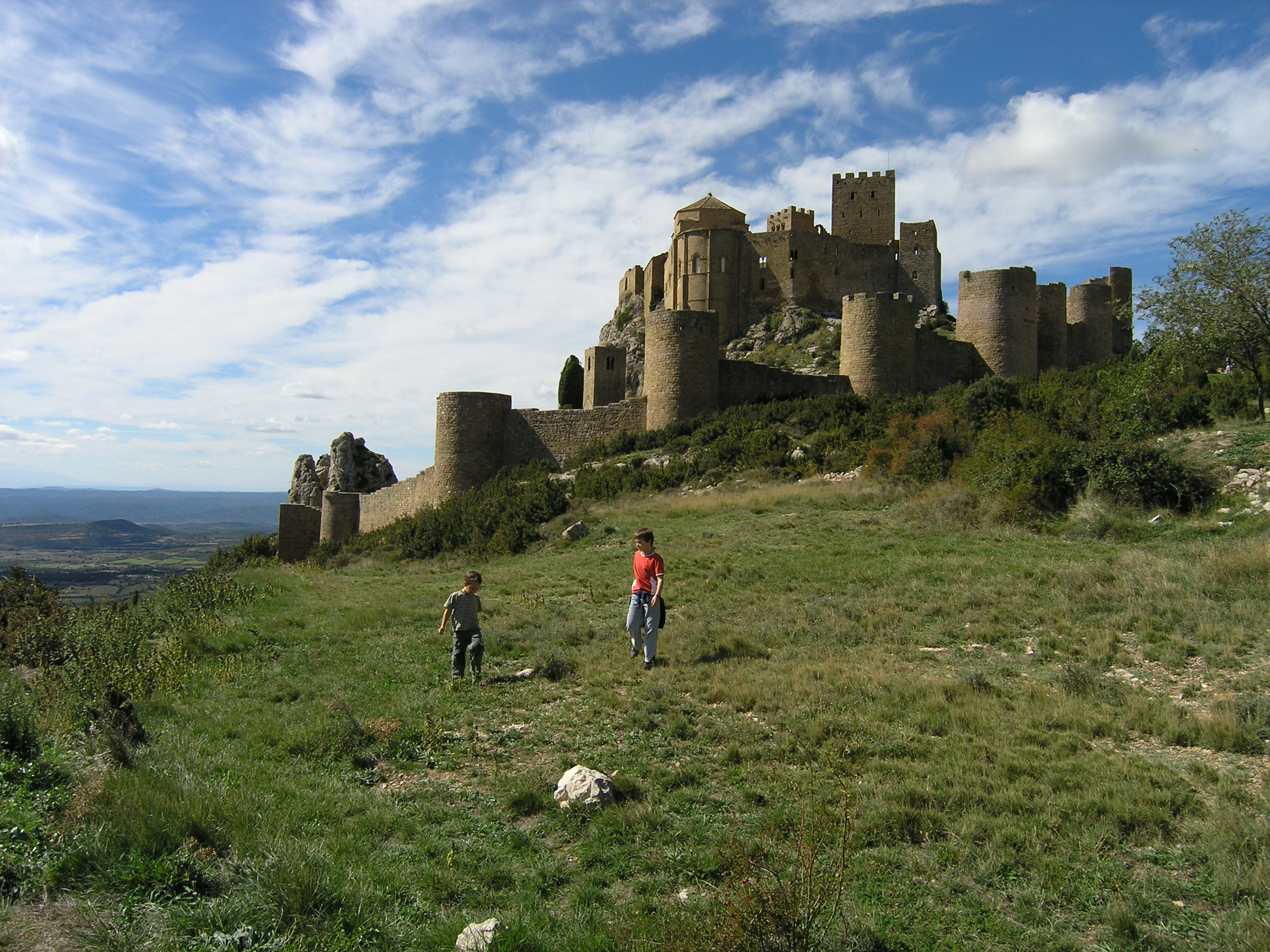
Castle of Loarre was built and expanded to serve as a frontier advance towards Muslim territories. It is one of the most important intact Romanesque castles in Europe.

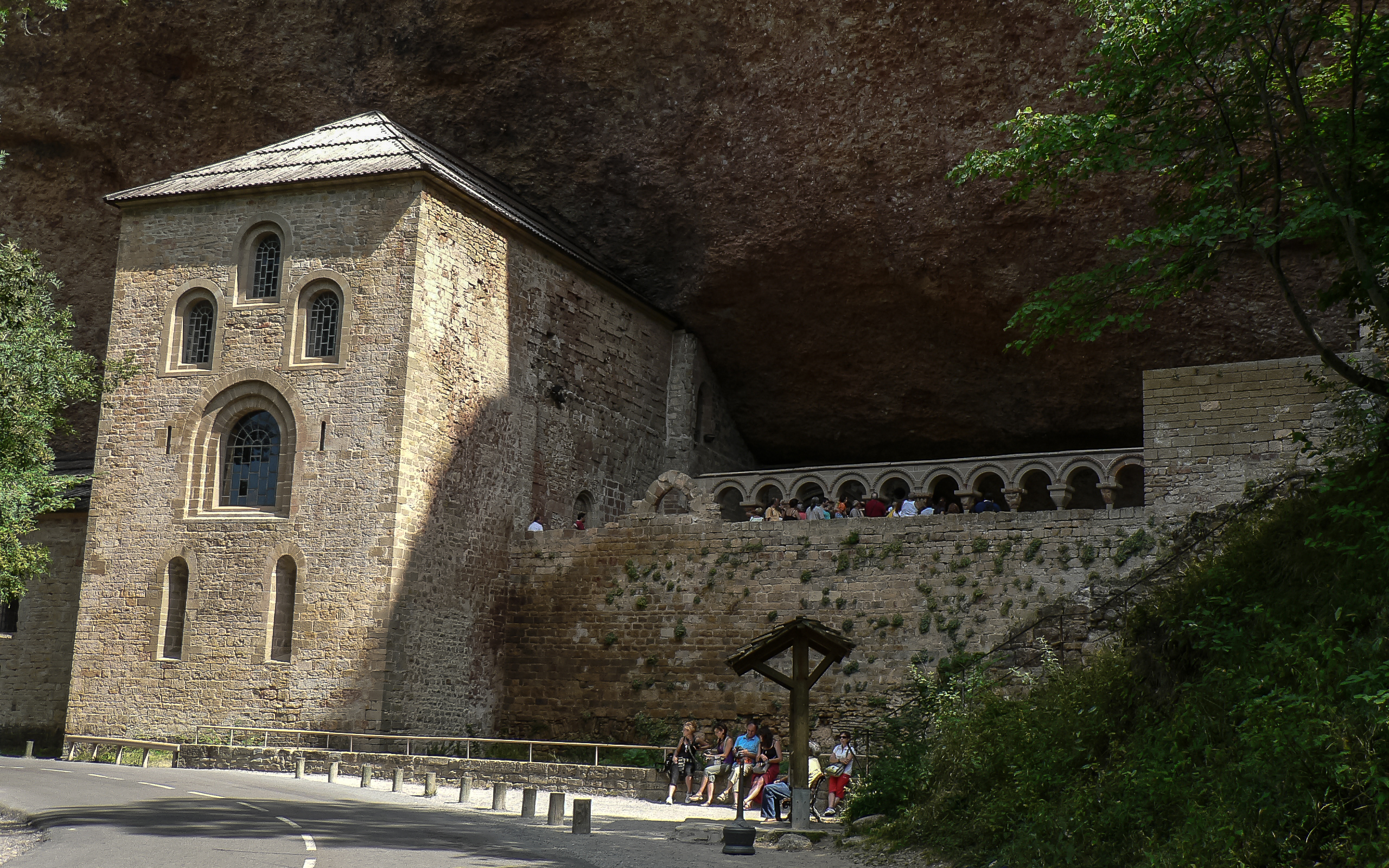
Royal Monastery of San Juan de la Peña. In its Royal Pantheon, a good number of kings of Aragon and some kings of Navarre are buried.

That County of Aragon would be linked to the Kingdom of Pamplona until 1035, and under its wing it would grow to form a dowry of García Sánchez III of Pamplona until the death of the king Sancho "the Great", in a period characterized by Muslim hegemony over almost the entire Iberian Peninsula. During the reign of Ramiro I of Aragon, the borders would be extended following the annexation of the counties of Sobrarbe and Ribagorza (year 1044), after having incorporated the populations of the historical comarca of Cinco Villas.

In 1076, on the death of Sancho IV of Pamplona, Aragon incorporated part of the Navarrese kingdom into its territories while Castile did the same with the western area of the former domains of Sancho "the Great". During the reigns of Sancho Ramírez and Peter I of Aragon and Pamplona, the kingdom extended its borders to the south, established threatening fortresses in the capital of Zaragoza in El Castellar and Juslibol and took Huesca, which became the new capital.

The reign of Alfonso I of Aragon saw the conquering of the lowlands of the middle Ebro Valley for Aragon: Ejea de los Caballeros, Valtierra, Calatayud, Tudela and Zaragoza, the capital of the Taifa of Saraqusta. Upon his death the nobles would choose his brother Ramiro II of Aragon, who left his religious life to assume the royal scepter and perpetuate the dynasty, which he achieved with the dynastic union of the House of Aragon with the owner of the County of Barcelona (later the Principality of Catalonia) in 1137, year in which the union of both patrimonies would give rise to the Crown of Aragon and would add the forces that would make the conquests of the Kingdom of Majorca and the Kingdom of Valencia possible. The Crown of Aragon would become the hegemonic power of the Mediterranean, controlling territories as important as Sicily, Corsica, Sardinia or Naples.

The monarch was known as King of Aragon and also held the titles of King of Valencia, King of Majorca (for a time), Count of Barcelona, Lord of Montpellier, and (temporarily) Duke of Athens and Neopatria. Each of these titles gave him sovereignty over the specific region, and the titles changed as territories were lost and won.

According to Aragonese law, the monarch had to swear allegiance to the kingdom's laws before being accepted as king. Like other Pyrenean and Basque realms, the Aragonese justice and decision-making system was based on Pyrenean consuetudinary law. The King was considered primus inter pares ('first among equals') within the nobility. A nobleman with the title Chustizia d'Aragón acted as ombudsman and was responsible for ensuring that the King obeyed the Aragonese laws. An old saying goes, "en Aragón antes de Rey hubo Ley" ("in Aragon Law came before King"), similar to the saying in Navarre, "antes fueron Leyes que Reyes", with much the same meaning.

The subsequent legend made the Aragonese monarchy eligible and created a phrase for the coronation of the king that would be perpetuated for centuries:

We, who are worth as much as you we make you our King and Lord, as long as you keep our fueros and liberties, and if not, not.

— The Justicia de Aragón

The Crown of Aragon in the middle of the 15th century

This situation would be repeated in the Commitment of Caspe (1412), which avoided a war that had dismembered the Crown of Aragon when a good handful of aspirants to the throne emerged after the death of Martin of Aragon, a year after the death of his firstborn, Martin I of Sicily. Ferdinand I of Aragon is the chosen one, of the Castilian House of Trastámara, but also directly connected with the Aragonese king Peter IV of Aragon, through his mother Eleanor of Aragon.

Aragon was already a large-scale political entity: the Crown, the Cortes, the Deputation of the Kingdom and the Foral Law constituted its nature and its character. The marriage of Ferdinand II of Aragon with Isabella I of Castile, celebrated in 1469 in Valladolid, led to the union of the crowns of Aragon and Castile, creating the basis of the Modern State.

=== Early Modern Age c. 1500–1789 ===
The Early Modern Age was marked by increasing tension between the power of the Spanish Monarchy and that of the regions. The appointment of a Castilian as Viceroy in 1590, contrary to the agreement all Royal officials be Aragonese caused widespread unrest; when the Madrid authorities attempted to arrest the Aragonese writer and politician Antonio Perez in May 1591, it caused street violence in Zaragossa and a revolt known as the Alterations of Aragon. The unrest was largely confined to Zaragossa and quickly suppressed, with Perez going into exile. Philip then ordered a reduction in the proportion of taxes retained by the Generality of Aragon to lessen their capacity to raise an army against him.

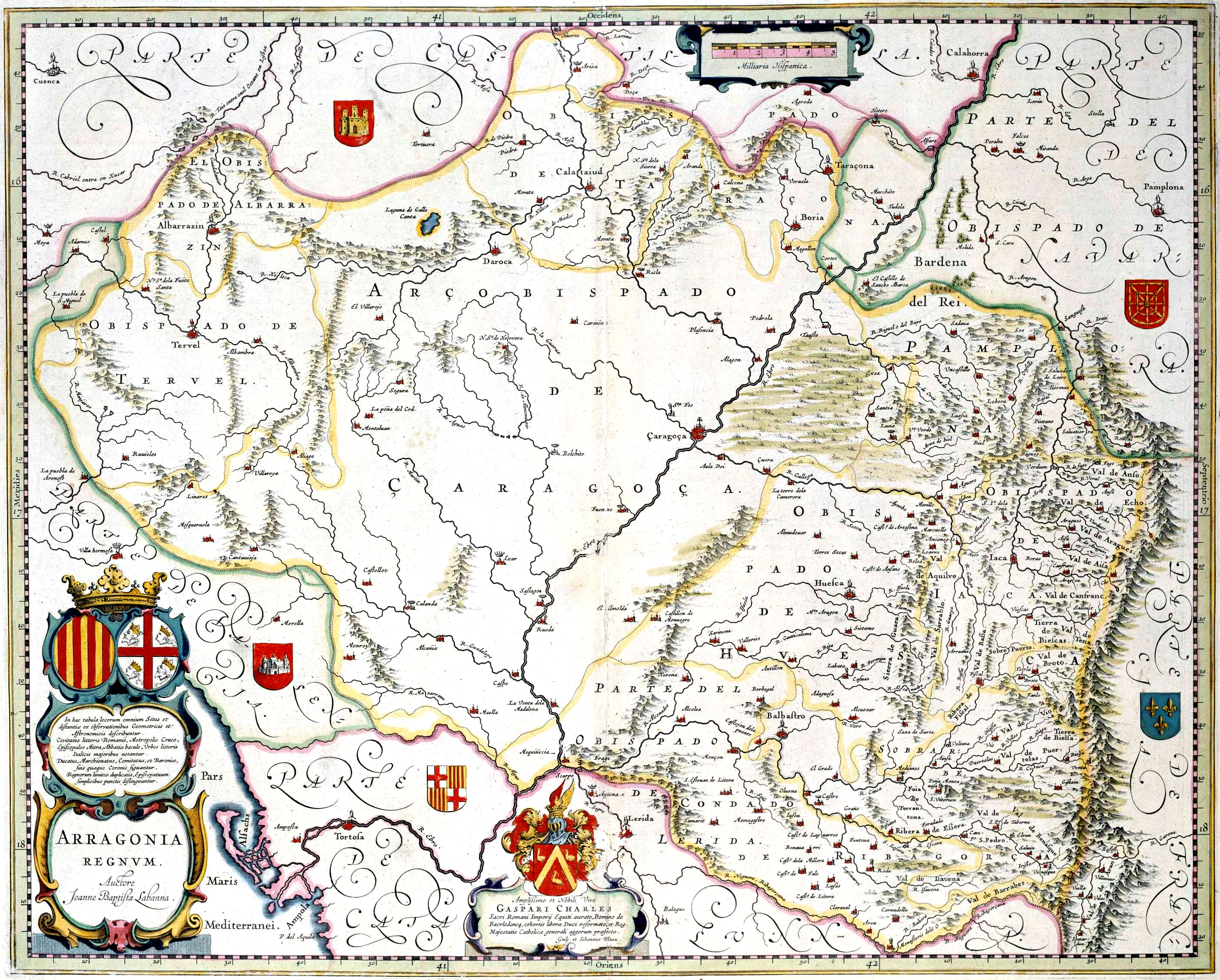
Aragonia Regnum, map of the Blaeu based on that of João Baptista Lavanha published circa 1640

The decay of independent institutions meant political activity focused instead on the preservation of Aragonese history, culture and art. The Archive of the Kingdom of Aragon preserved legal documents and records from the Justicia and the Palace of Deputation or Parliament, largely destroyed by the French in the battles of 1809. Debates on the causes of the 1590/91 revolt became a contest between opposing views of history that arguably persist in modern Spain.

The new emphasis on Aragonese history led to the creation of the position of Chronicler or Historian of Aragon; its holders included Jerónimo Zurita y Castro, the De Argensola brothers, Bartolomé and Lupercio, Juan Costa and Jerónimo Martel. Much of the work produced by Aragonese writers challenged Philip II's version of events and was censored by the central government. In retaliation, the Generality of Aragon ordered the work of Castilian historian Antonio de Herrera y Tordesillas to be burned and commissioned Vicencio Blasco de Lanuza to write an alternative. His 'History of Aragon' was published in two volumes, 1616 and 1619, respectively; the urgency shows the importance placed on responding to Herrera. Other works commissioned at this time for the same purpose include a History of the Aragonese Deputation by Lorenzo Ibáñez de Aoiz and a detailed cartography of the Kingdom of Aragon by João Baptista Lavanha.

In 1590–1591, the Spanish monarchy was at the height of its strength, but during the 17th century, Spanish power declined for a number of reasons. Famine, disease and almost continuous warfare, largely in the Spanish Netherlands drained money, energy and men and weakened the economy; it is estimated the population of Spain fell nearly 25% between 1600 and 1700.

War and economic decline inevitably led to increases in taxes, with predictable results; the refusal of the Corts of Catalonia to contribute their share of the 1626 Union of Arms eventually led to a full-scale revolt in 1640. While Aragon itself remained relatively peaceful, it had to be treated with care by the Madrid government; during the reign of Charles II from 1665 to 1700, it provided his half-brother John of Austria with a power base in his battle for control of government with the Queen Regent Mariana of Austria.

During the 1701–1714 War of the Spanish Succession, the kingdoms of Aragon, Valencia, Mallorca and the Principality of Catalonia supported the Austrian claimant Charles. The victory of Philip V accelerated the trend towards greater centralisation; the Nueva Planta decrees of 1707 abolished the fueros, and Aragonese political structures, with their powers transferred to the Deputation of the Kingdom in Madrid; Aragon and Valencia were brought into the system in 1712, Catalonia and Majorca following in 1767.

=== 1790–1936 ===
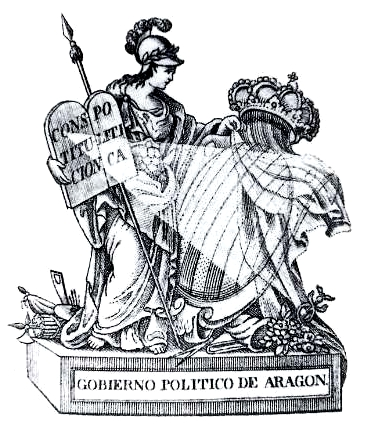
Emblem of the Political Government of Aragon under the Liberal Triennium, 1820

The French invasion of 1808 that made Joseph Bonaparte King led to the outbreak of the Guerra de la Independencia Española or War of Independence in May. Zaragoza was largely destroyed in February 1809 during the Second Siege of Zaragoza, bringing a halt to its economic development. The 1812 Constitution proposed a number of reforms, including the creation of provincial territories and dividing Aragon into the four provinces of Calatayud, Teruel, Soria and Guadalajara. However, these reforms were delayed by Ferdinand VII's refusal to accept the constitution and were finally implemented in 1822 during the 1820–23 Trienio Liberal. When Ferdinand was restored by French Bourbon forces in 1823, he abolished the Constitution along with the provincial reforms. When he died in 1833, the provincial division of 1833 divided Aragon into its current three provinces.

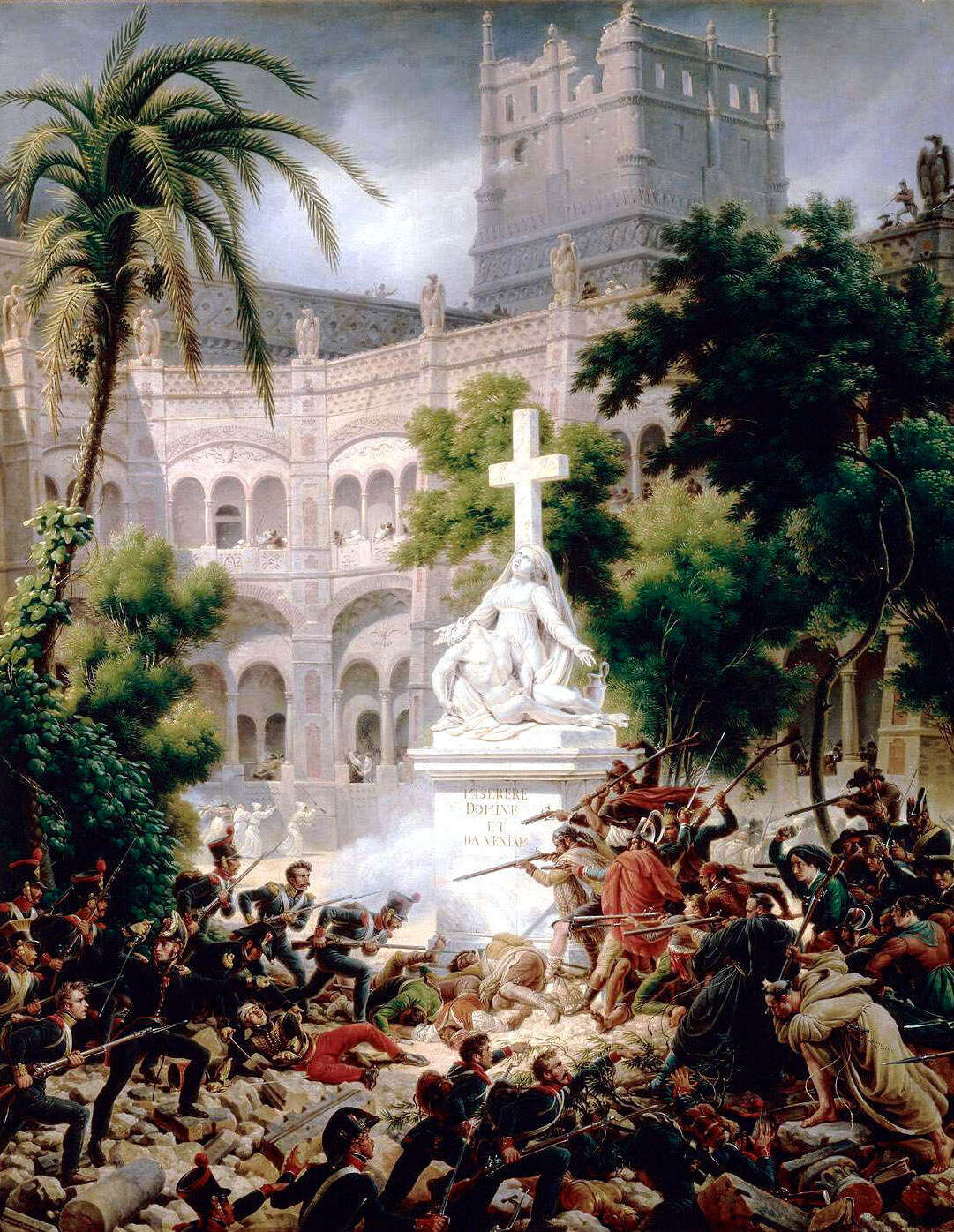
French troops storming the Abbey of Santa Engracia during the 1809 siege of Zaragoza

Throughout the 19th century, Aragon was a stronghold of the Carlists, who offered to restore the fueros and other rights associated with the former Kingdom of Aragon. This period saw a massive exodus from the countryside into the larger cities of Aragon, such as Huesca, Zaragoza, Teruel or Calatayud and other nearby regions, such as Catalonia or Madrid.

The history of Aragon in the first half of the 20th century was similar to that of the rest of Spain; the building of infrastructure and reforms made by Miguel Primo de Rivera led to a brief economic boom, with new civil and individual liberties during the Second Spanish Republic. In June 1936, a draft Statute of Autonomy of Aragon was presented to the Cortes Generales, but the outbreak of the Spanish Civil War prevented the development of this autonomist project.

=== Spanish Civil War 1936–1939 ===
During the 1936–1939 Civil War, Aragon was divided between both sides. The eastern area, closer to Catalonia, was run by the Republican Regional Defence Council of Aragon, while the larger western area was controlled by the Nationalists. Some of the most important battles of the war were fought in or near Aragon, including Belchite, Teruel and Ebro. After the defeat of the Republic in April 1939, Aragon and the rest of Spain were governed by the Francoist dictatorship.

Aragon was a stronghold for the Spanish Revolution, which was a workers' social revolution that began at the outbreak of the Spanish Civil War in 1936 and for two to three years resulted in the widespread implementation of anarchist and, more broadly, libertarian socialist organizational principles throughout various portions of the country.

In Aragon, agrarian collectives were formed that were structured by work groups of between five and ten members. To each work group, the community assigned a piece of land for which it was responsible. Each group elected a delegate who represented their views at community meetings. A management committee was responsible for the day-to-day running of the community. This committee was in charge of obtaining materials, carrying out exchanges with other areas, organizing the distribution of production, and the public works that were necessary. Its members were elected in general assemblies in which all the people who made up the community participated.

Even during the second phase of the revolution, when some revolutionary structures were subordinated to the government, giving rise to the dissolution or beginning of absorption, appropriation, and intervention of the revolutionary structures by the republican state government, Aragon remained a stronghold of anarcho-syndicalist labor.

=== 1939–present ===
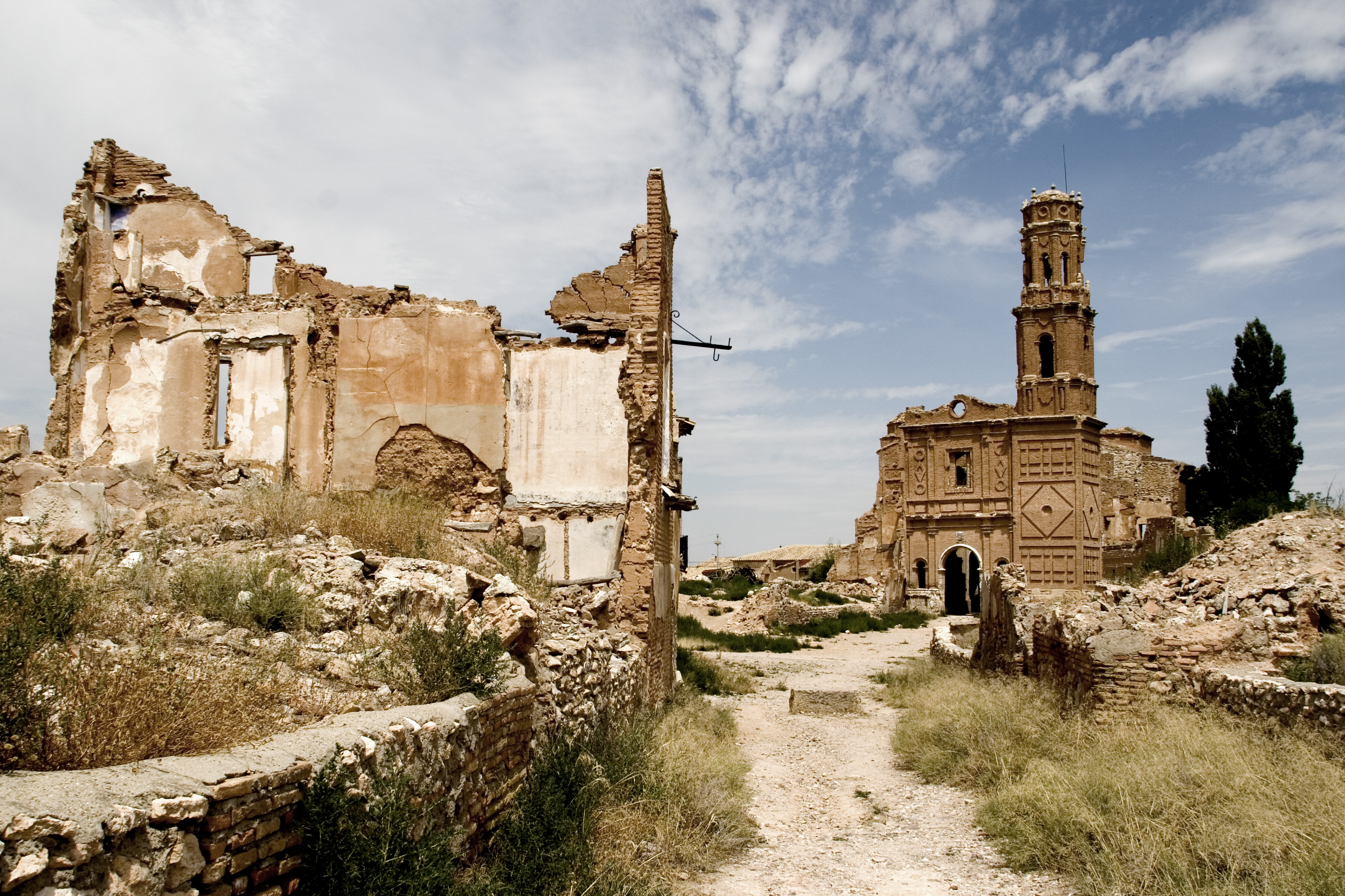
Belchite town, destroyed during the Battle of Belchite, became a symbol of the Spanish Civil War.

Especially during the 1960s, there were large migrations, with a depopulation of the rural areas, towards the industrial areas like the provincial capitals, other areas of Spain, and other European countries. In 1964, one of the so-called Development Poles was created in Zaragoza.

In the 1970s, the old town of Mequinenza was demolished almost completely due to the construction of the Ribarroja reservoir. The inhabitants of Mequinenza had to leave their homes to move to the new town on the banks of the River Segre. Some left for more industrial areas such as Barcelona or Zaragoza, or even abroad to continue working in mining industries. By the end of 1974, all of the population had already abandoned the Old Town of Mequinenza and was living in the new town.

In the 1970s, a period of transition, as in the rest of the country, was experienced after the extinction of the previous regime, with the recovery of democratic normality and the creation of a new constitutional framework.

It began to demand its own political autonomy, for the Aragonese historical territory; a sentiment that was reflected in the historic manifestation of April 23, 1978, that brought together more than 100000 aragoneses through the streets of Zaragoza.

Not having plebiscited, in the past, affirmatively a draft Statute of autonomy (second transitory provision of the constitution) and not making use of the difficult access to autonomy by Article 151 whose aggravated procedure required, apart from the initiative of the process autonomic follow the steps of article 143, which was ratified by three quarters of the municipalities of each of the affected provinces that represent at least the majority of the electoral census, and that this initiative was approved by referendum by the affirmative vote of the majority absolute of the electors of each province, Aragon acceded to the self-government by the slow way of article 143 obtaining lower competence top, and less self-management of resources, during more than 20 years.

On August 10, 1982, Aragon's autonomy statute was approved by the Cortes Generales, signed by the then president of the Government, Leopoldo Calvo-Sotelo, and sanctioned by His Majesty Juan Carlos I of Spain.

On May 7, 1992, a Special Commission of the Aragonese Corts elaborated a reformed text that was approved by the Aragonese Corts and by the Spanish Cortes. Again, a small statutory reform in the year 1996 extended the competence framework, forcing a definitive comprehensive review for several years. A new statutory text was approved in 2007 by a majority but without reaching total unanimity.

At the beginning of the 21st century, a significant increase in infrastructures was established, such as the arrival of the High Speed Train (AVE), the construction of the new dual carriageway Somport-Sagunto and the promotion of the two airports in the Autonomous Community, Zaragoza and Huesca-Pirineos. At the same time, large technological projects are being undertaken, such as the Walqa Technology Park and the implementation of a telematic network throughout the community.

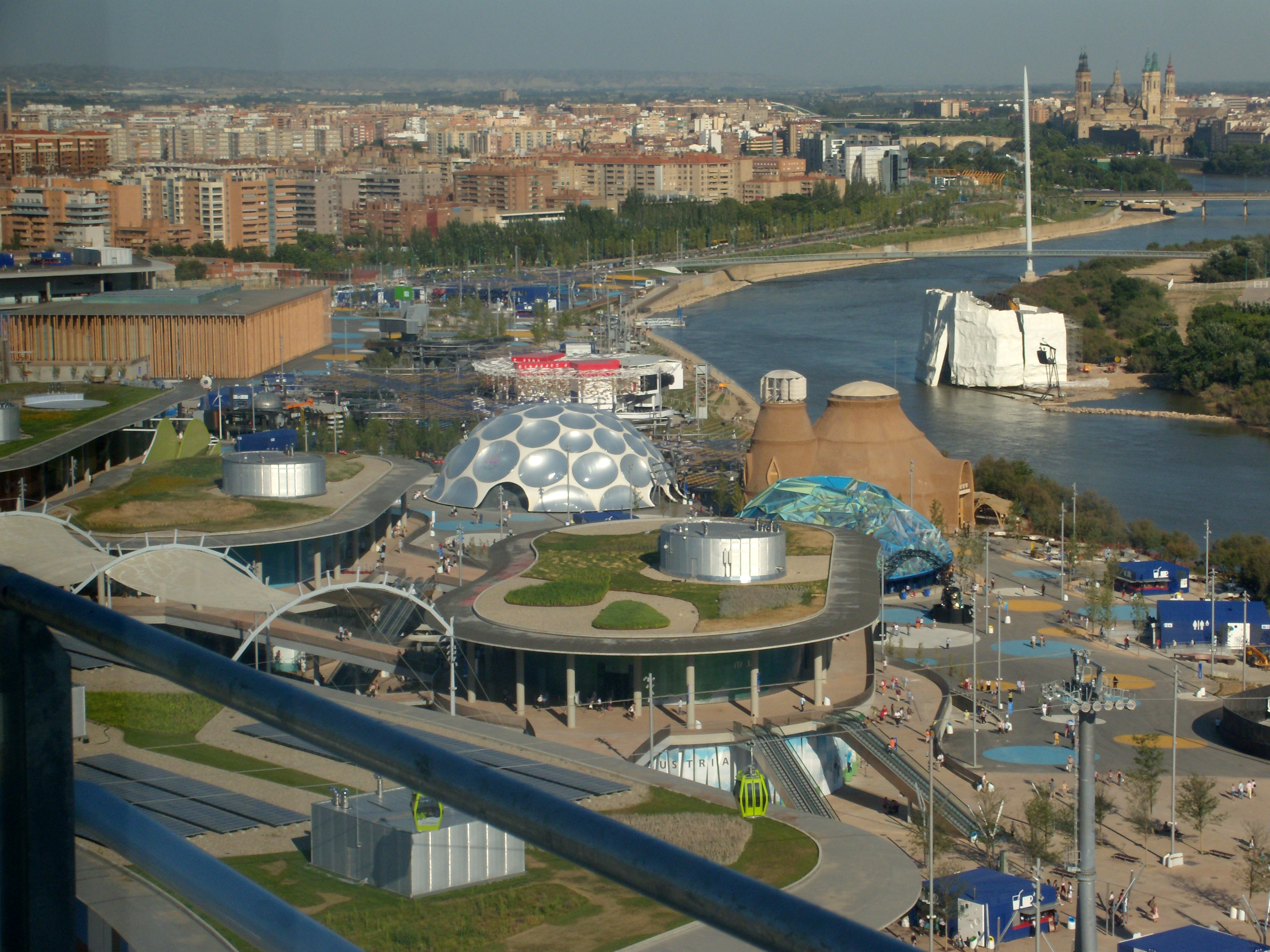
General view of the Expo 2008 from the Torre del Agua

In 2007 the Statute of Autonomy of Aragon was reformed again -which was approved by a broad consensus in the Aragonese Corts, having the support of the PSOE, the PP, the PAR and the IU, whereas CHA abstained- granting the Autonomous Community the recognition of historical nationality (since the Organic Law of 1996 reform of the statute, it had the condition of nationality), includes a new title on the Administration of Chustizia and another on the rights and duties of the Aragoneses and guiding principles of public policies, the possibility of creating an own tax agency in collaboration with that of the State, and also the obligation to public authorities to ensure to avoid transfers from watersheds such as transfer of the Ebro, among many other modifications of the Statute of Autonomy.

The designation of Zaragoza as the venue for the 2008 International Exhibition, whose thematic axis was water and sustainable development, represented a series of changes and accelerated growth for the autonomous community. In addition, two anniversaries were celebrated that year: the bicentennial of Sieges of Zaragoza of the War of Independence against the Napoleonic invasion, occurred in 1808, and the centenary of the Hispano-French Exposition of 1908 that it supposed as a modern event, to demonstrate the cultural and economic thrust of Aragon and at the same time serve to strengthen ties and staunch wounds with the French neighbors after the events of the Napoleonic Wars of the previous century.

== Geography ==
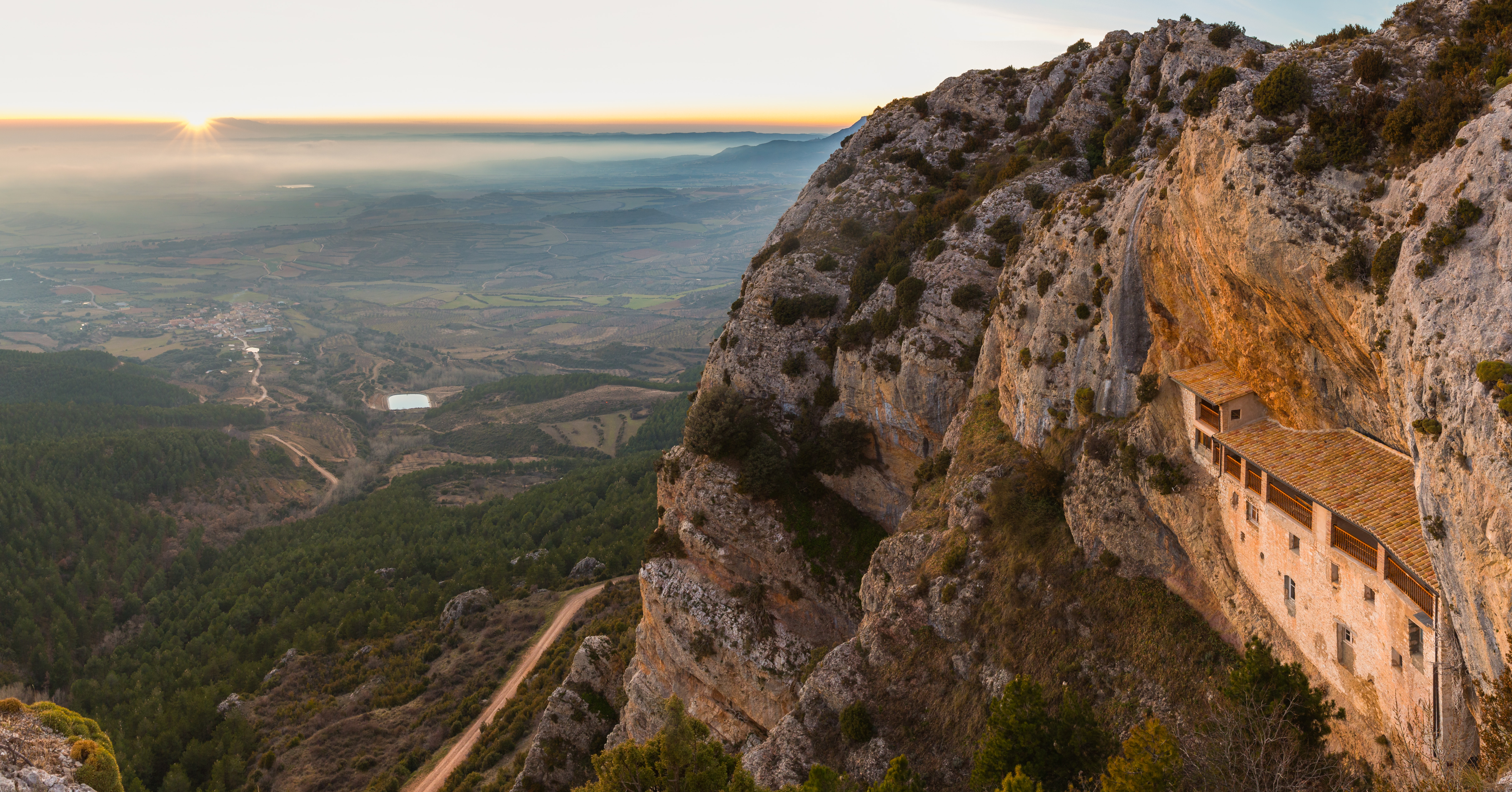
Hermitage of la Virgen de la Peña in Aniés, La Sotonera, province of Huesca

The area of Aragon is 47720 km^{2} of which 15636 km^{2} belong to the province of Huesca, 17275 km^{2} to the province of Zaragoza and 14810 km^{2} to the province of Teruel. The total represents a 9.43% of the surface of Spain, being thus the fourth autonomous community in size behind Castile and León, Andalusia, and Castile-La Mancha.

It is located in the northeast of the Iberian Peninsula, at a latitude between 39º and 43º'N in the temperate zone. Its boundaries and borders are in the north with France (the regions of Nouvelle-Aquitaine and Occitanie), in the west with the autonomous communities of Castile-La Mancha (provinces of Guadalajara and Cuenca), Castile and León (province of Soria), La Rioja and Navarre, and in the east with the autonomous communities of Catalonia (provinces of Lleida and Tarragona) and the Valencian Community (provinces of Castellón and Valencia).

=== Relief ===
The orography of the community has as the central axis the Ebro valley (with heights between 150 and 300 meters approx.) which transits between two foothill areas, the Pyrenean and the Iberian, preambles of two mountain formations, the Pyrenees to the north and the Sistema Ibérico mountain range to the south; the Community has the highest peaks of both mountain ranges, the Aneto and the Moncayo respectively.

==== Pyrenees ====
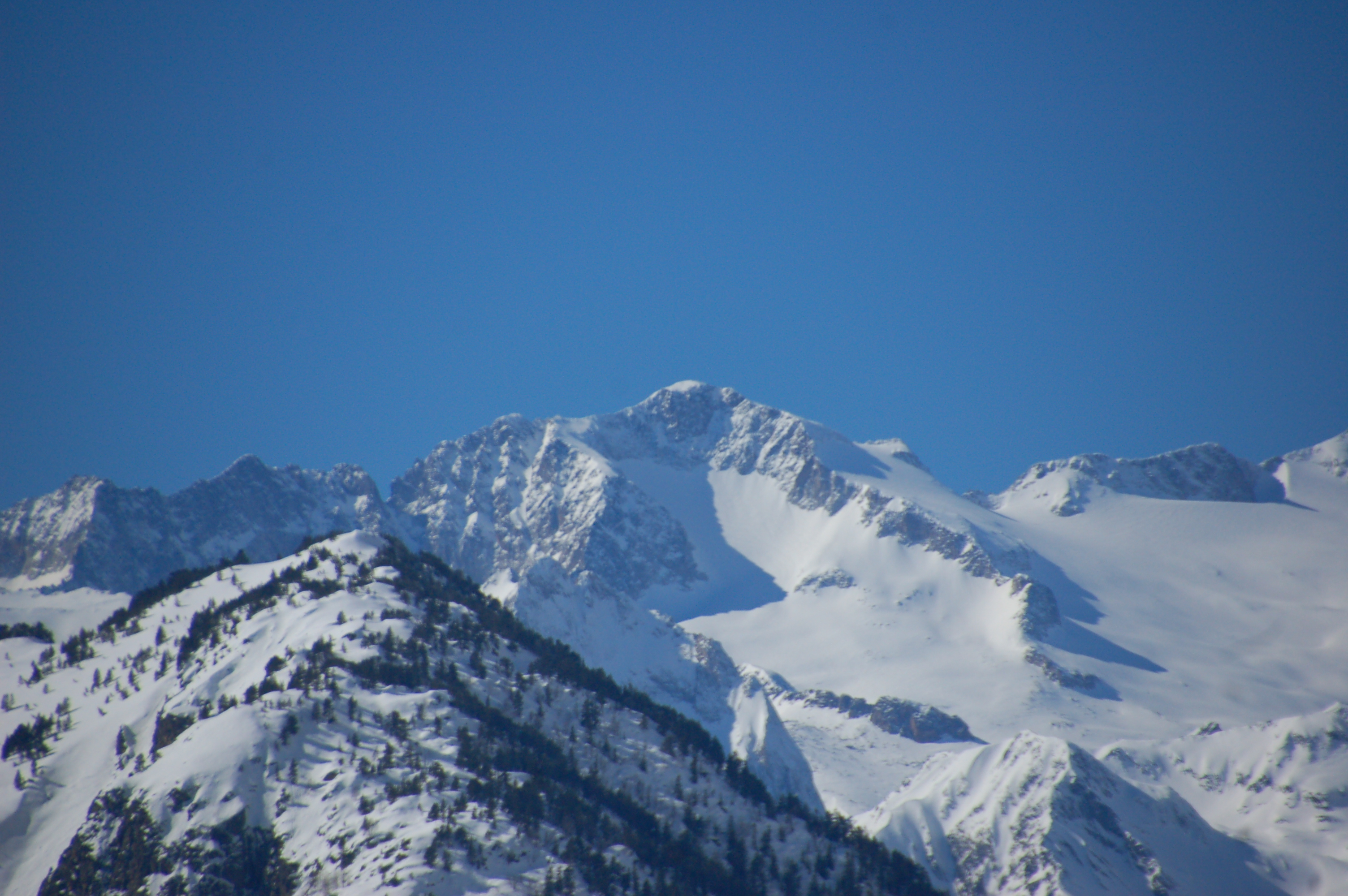
Aneto peak is the highest point of all Pyrenees. It is located in the Posets–Maladeta Natural Park.

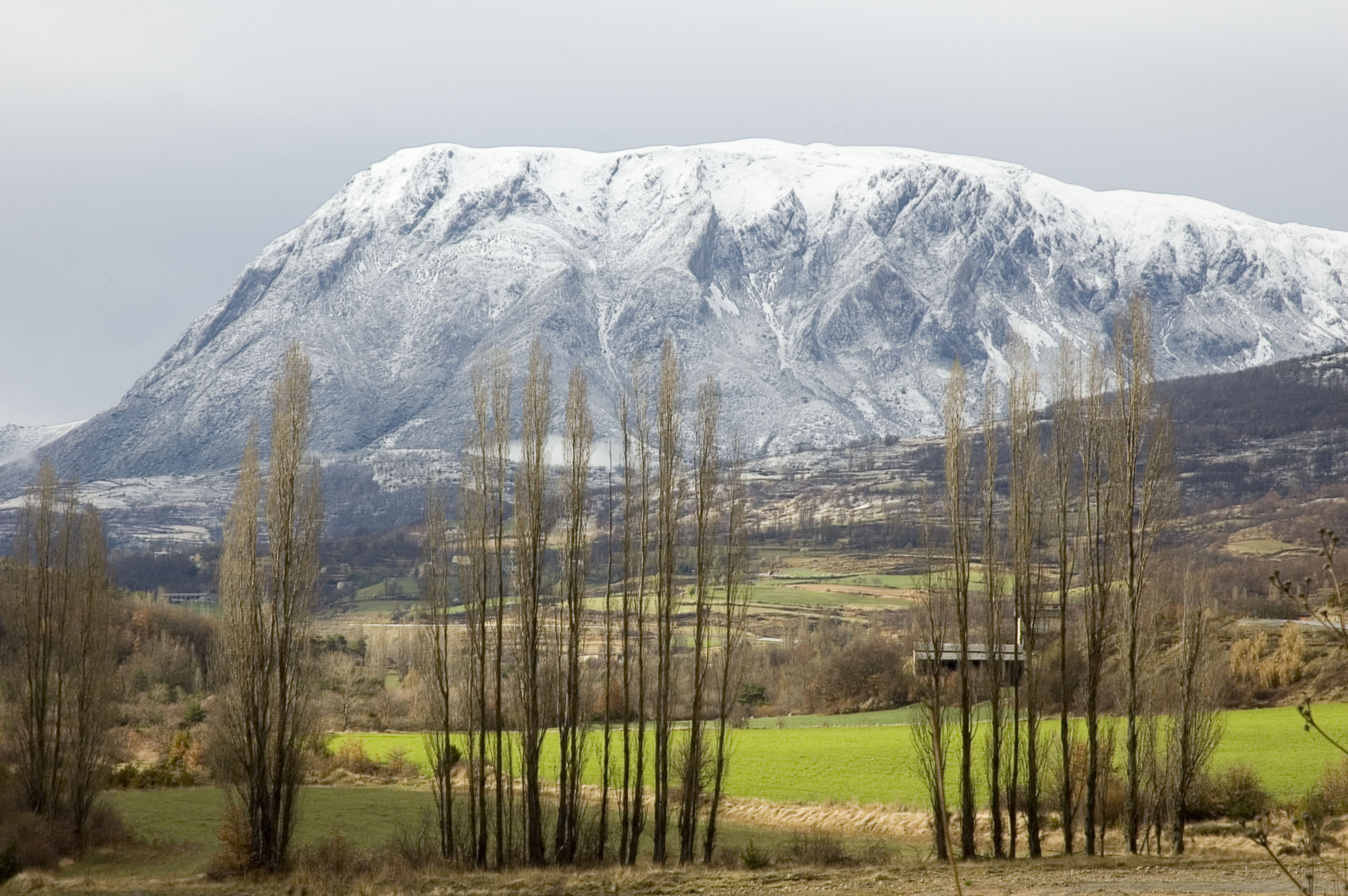
El Turbón, emblematic mountain of Aragon

The Aragonese Pyrenees are located in the north of the province of Huesca and are arranged longitudinally in three large units: High Pyrenees, Internal Depressions and Outer Ranges.

The Aragonese High Pyrenees contains the maximum heights of all the Pyrenees mountainous chain. The High Pyrenees is formed in turn by the axial Pyrenees and the Inland Ranges.

In the axial Pyrenees are the oldest materials: granites, quartzites, slates and limestones and the highest peaks like: the Aneto (3404 m), Maladeta (3309 m) and the Perdiguero (3221 m). The inner Pre-Pyrenees, composed of more modern rocks (limestones) also has large mountains such as Monte Perdido (3355 m), Collarada (2886 m) and Tendeñera (2853 m).

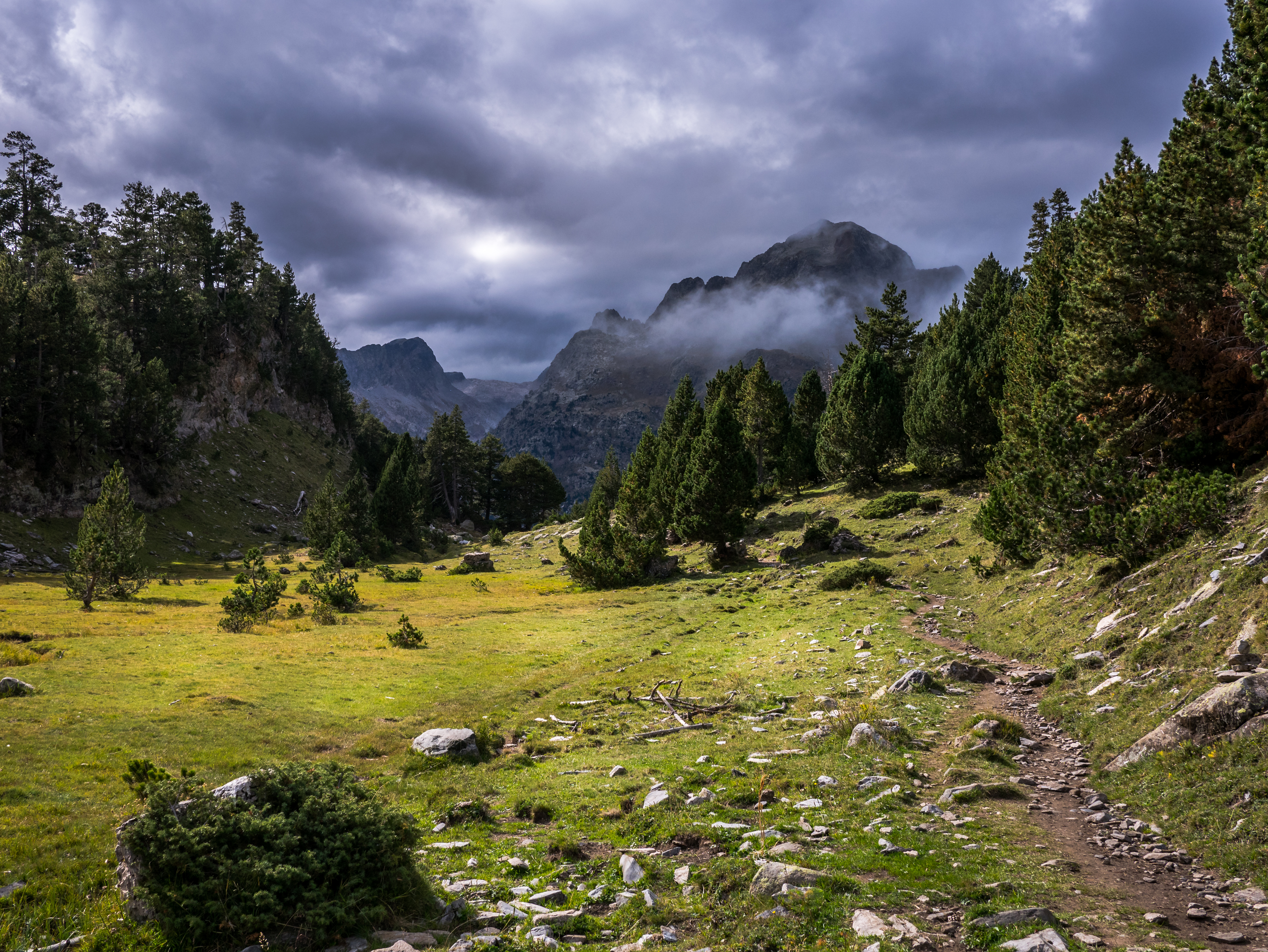
La Besurta trail in the Benasque Pyrenean Valley

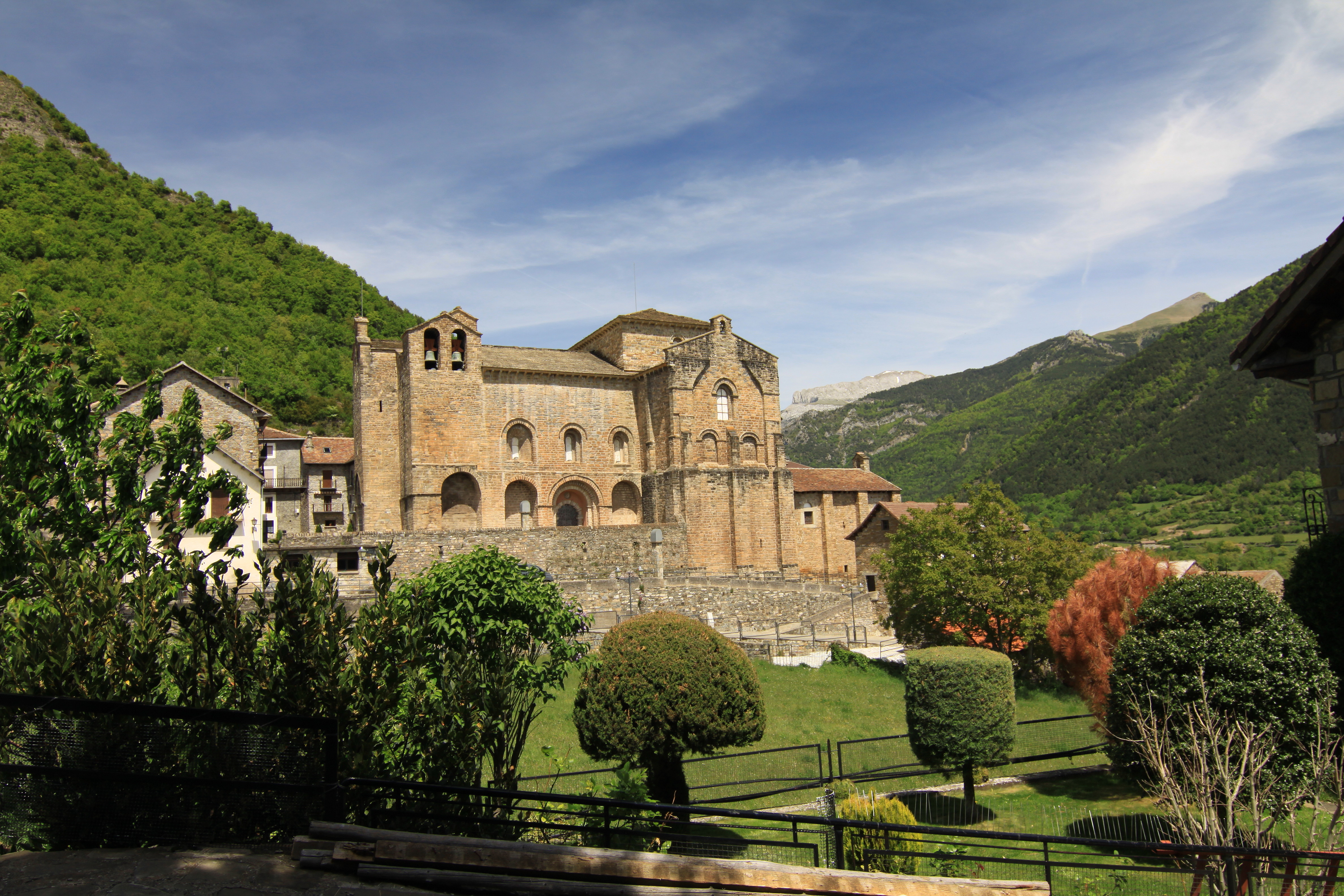
Abbey of San Pedro de Siresa, monastic, political and cultural center of the ancient County of Aragon, where Alfonso I was educated. It is located in the Hecho Pyrenean Valley.

The main Pyrenean valleys are formed by the rivers that are born there, which are:

- Ansó Valley: Veral river
- Hecho Valley: Aragón Subordán river
- Canfranc Valley: Aragón river
- Tena Valley: Gállego river
- Broto Valley: Ara river
- Aínsa Valley: Cinca river
  - Pineta Valley: Cinca river
  - Gistau Valley: Cinqueta river
- Benasque Valley: Ésera river

The intrapirenaic depression is a broad perpendicular corridor. Its best represented section is the Canal de Berdún, which limits on the south with the reliefs of San Juan de la Peña (1552 m) and Oroel Rock (1769 m), modeled on conglomerates of the Campodarbe Formation.

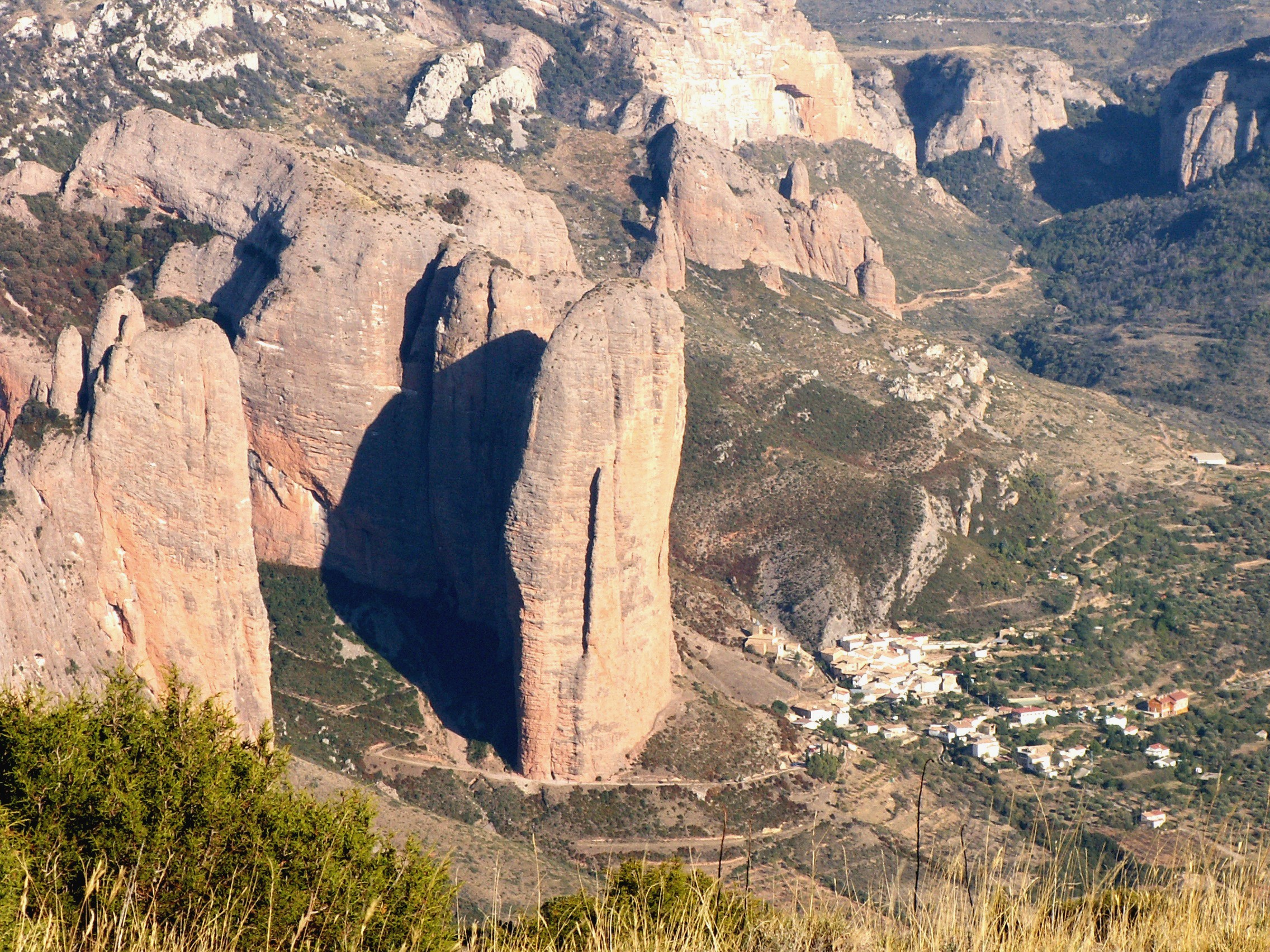
Mallos de Riglos conglomerate rock formations, in Las Peñas de Riglos

The pre-Pyrenean outer ranges are in the Huescan foothills and constitute the southernmost unit of the Pyrenees; formed by predominantly calcareous materials, reach heights between 1500 and 2000 meters. The Sierra de Guara, one of the most important mountain ranges of the Spanish Pre-Pyrenees, stands out; its summit, the Guara Peak, reaches 2077 metres. The Mallos de Riglos, near the town of Ayerbe, stand out for their beauty.

==== Depression of the Ebro ====
The Aragonese central depression includes a wide lowland area, which is also the central part of the Depression of the Ebro. North of the river there is the Sierra de Alcubierre ranges (811 m) one of the typical limestone plateaus of the valley.

The Ebro Valley is a tectonic pit filled with sedimentary materials, accumulated in the Tertiary age in horizontal series. In the center, fine materials such as clays, plasters and limestones were deposited. To the south of the Ebro there are the limestone plateaus of Borja and of Zaragoza.

==== Sistema Ibérico ====
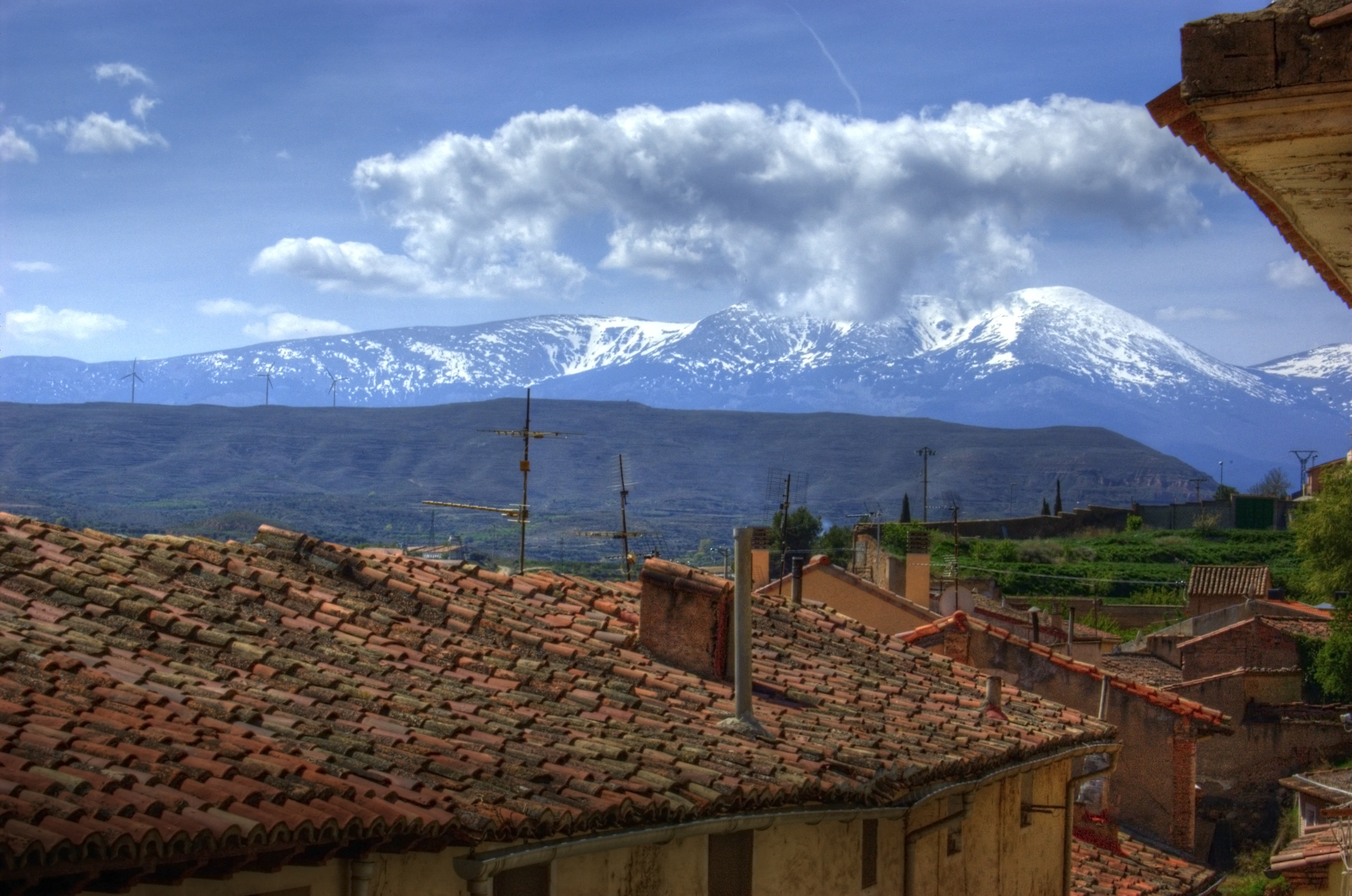
Moncayo Massif seen from Tarazona. Moncayo, with its height of 2314.3 m, is the maximum summit of the Sistema Ibérico mountainous chain.

The Aragonese section of the Sistema Ibérico straddles the provinces of Zaragoza and Teruel. It is a set of hills without a clear structural unit, which can be divided into two zones: Sistema Ibérico del Jalón and Sistema Ibérico turolense. In the first, the Moncayo stands out with 2314 m, formed by Paleozoic quartzites and slates, partly covered by Mesozoic limestones. The second is formed by elevated terrain (from 1000 to 2000 m in general), but flattened and massive. To the southwest of the depression the summits of the Sierra de Albarracín range are reached above 1800 m, southeast the 2000 m are reached in the Sierra de Javalambre range and finally the Sierra de Gúdar range (2024 m) transitions to the Maestrazgo area in the Valencian Community.

=== Climate and vegetation ===
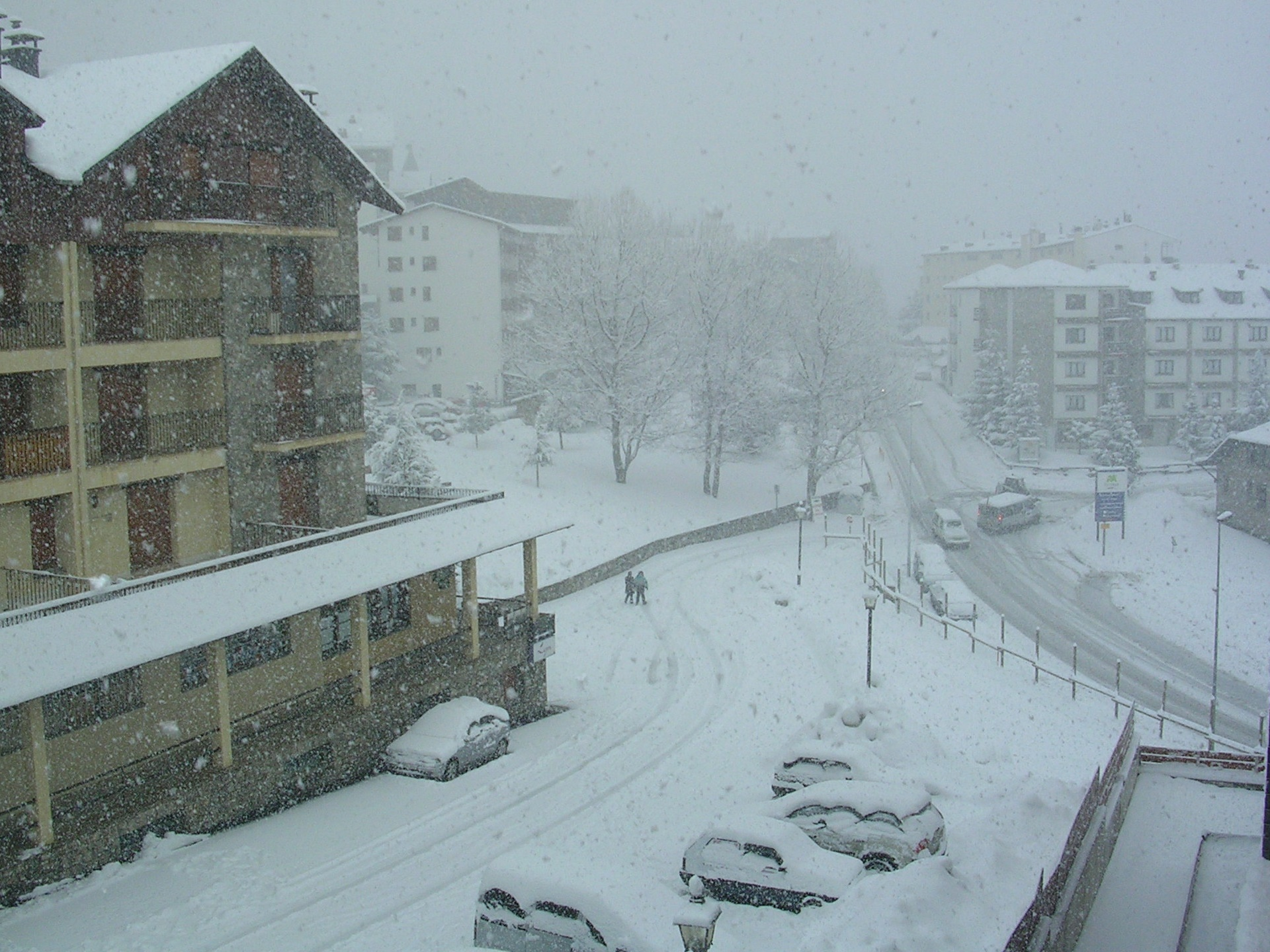
Formigal town in winter

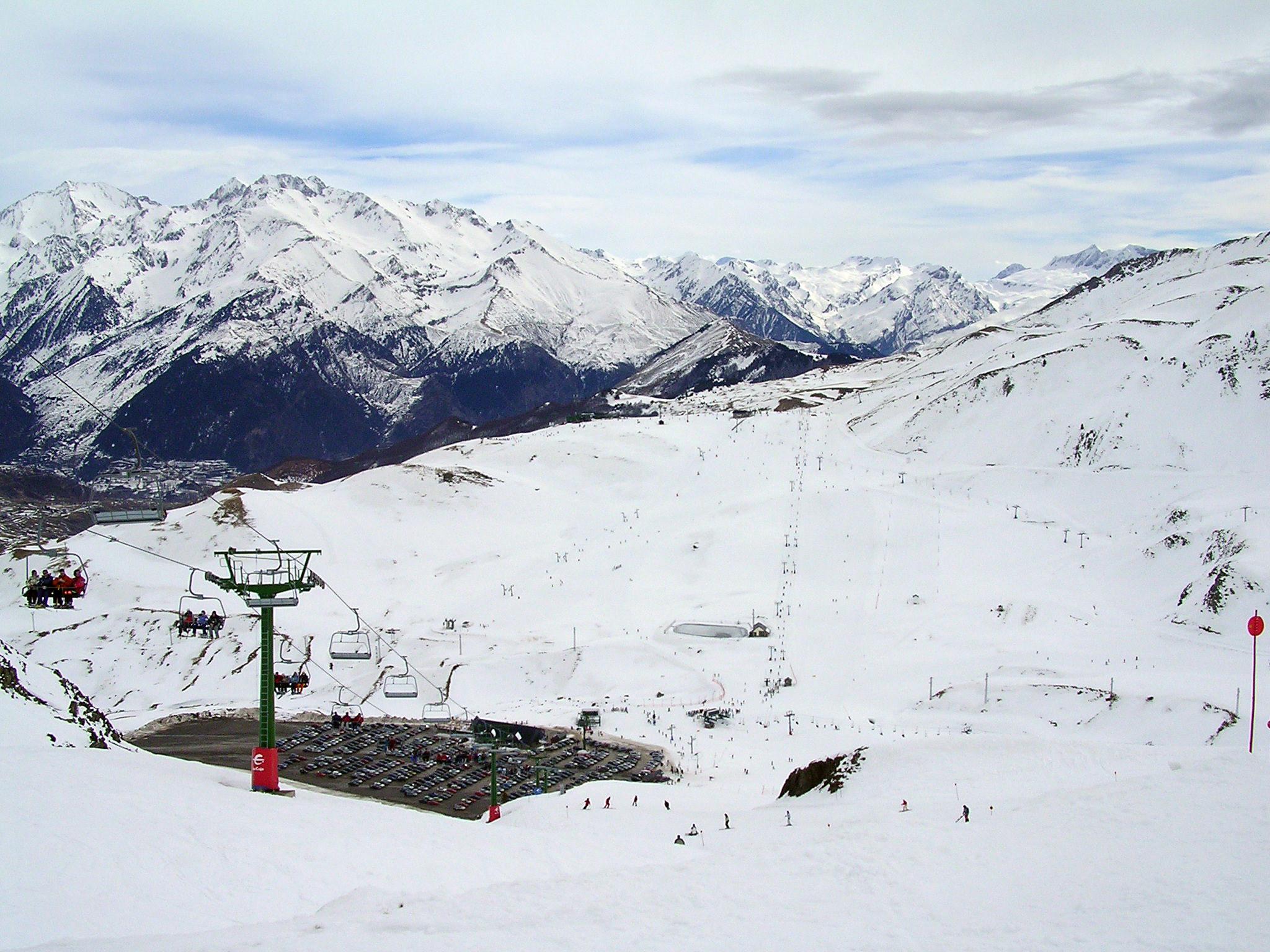
Formigal Ski Resort near Formigal town, Sallent de Gállego

There are two main types of climate in Aragón, the Semi-arid climate and the Oceanic climate. Its irregular orography creates several microclimates throughout the entire community. From the High mountain Alpine climate of the central Pyrenees to the north, with perpetual ice (glaciers), to the Humid subtropical climate (which is very common in Huesca's lower altitude areas) to the steppe or semi-desert zones, such as the Monegros Desert, passing through the intense continental climate of the Teruel-Daroca area and the Mediterranean climate in the southern areas bordering Castilla La Mancha and the Valencian Community.

The main characteristics of the Aragonese climate are:

- Rainfall is mostly low, with much of Aragon placed in a bowl of low ground between the Pyrenean mountain range to the north and the Sistema Ibérico mountain range to the south, cut off from maritime air masses. This situation means that the rain falls mainly in the higher areas, and that the temperature range features large contrasts, with cold winters and hot summers, as typical of continental climates.

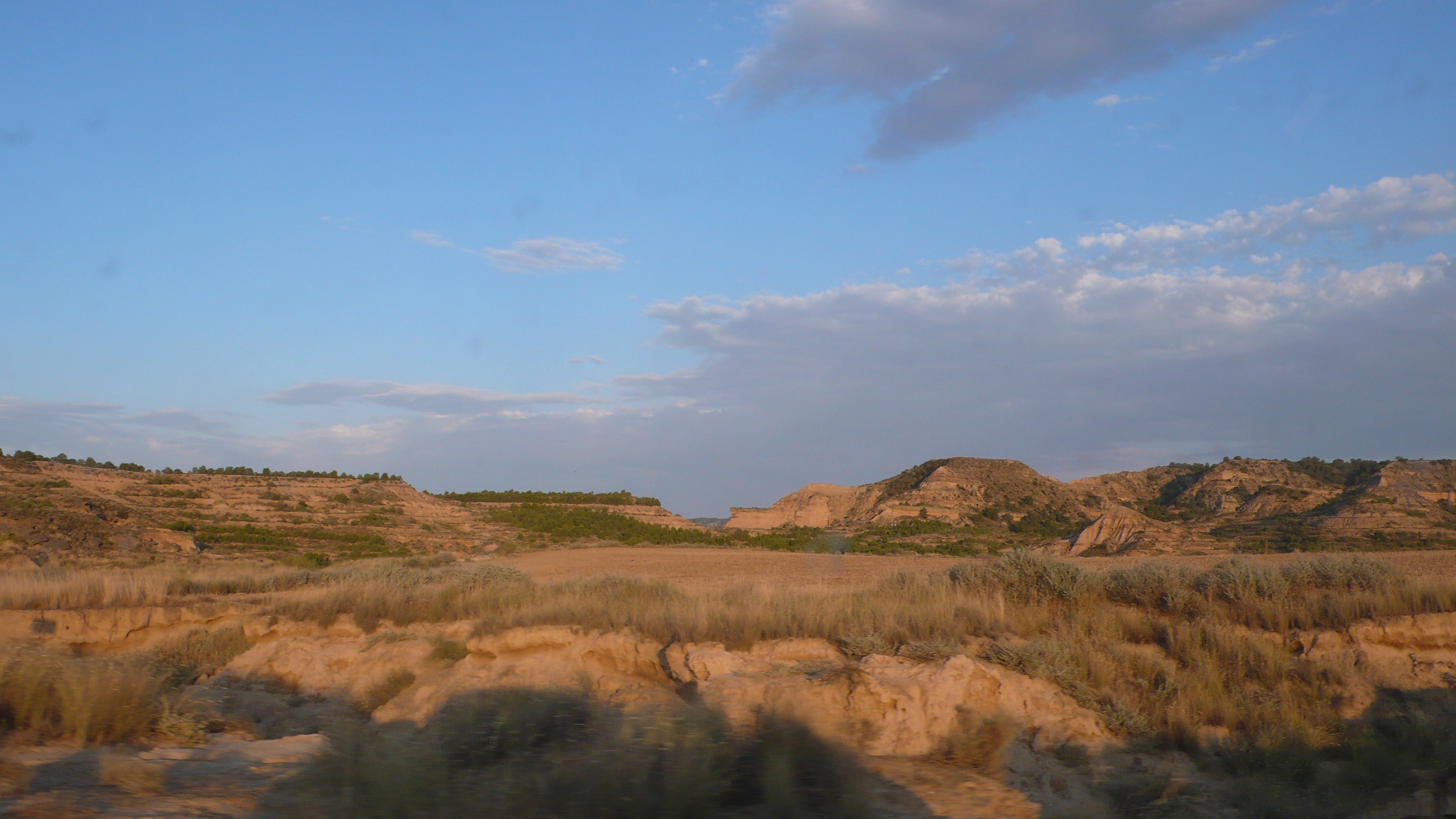
Monegros site, of arid climate and extreme temperatures

- Rainfall is also irregular, as typical of Mediterranean climates, with randomly alternating dry and wet years.
- The air currents are often encased in the middle Ebro Valley from northwest to southeast, giving a characteristic wind, the cierzo, which stands out for its intensity and frequency.

Temperatures are very dependent on the altitude. In the Ebro Valley the winters are relatively moderate, although the frosts are very common and the thermal sensation can decrease a lot with the cierzo. Temperatures in summer can exceed 40 °C in the central areas. In mountain areas winters are long and rigorous, average temperatures can be up to 10 °C lower than in the valley.

The two most important winds of Aragon are the cierzo and the bochorno or levant. The first is a cold and dry wind that crosses the Ebro Valley from northwest to southeast and that can become quite strong. The second is a warm wind, more irregular and smooth, coming from the south-east.

The vegetation follows the oscillations of relief and climate. There is a great variety, both in natural vegetation and in crops. In the high areas there are forests (pines, firs, beech trees, oaks), bush and meadows, and in the central Ebro Valley, evergreen oak and juniper are the most common trees.

=== Hydrography ===
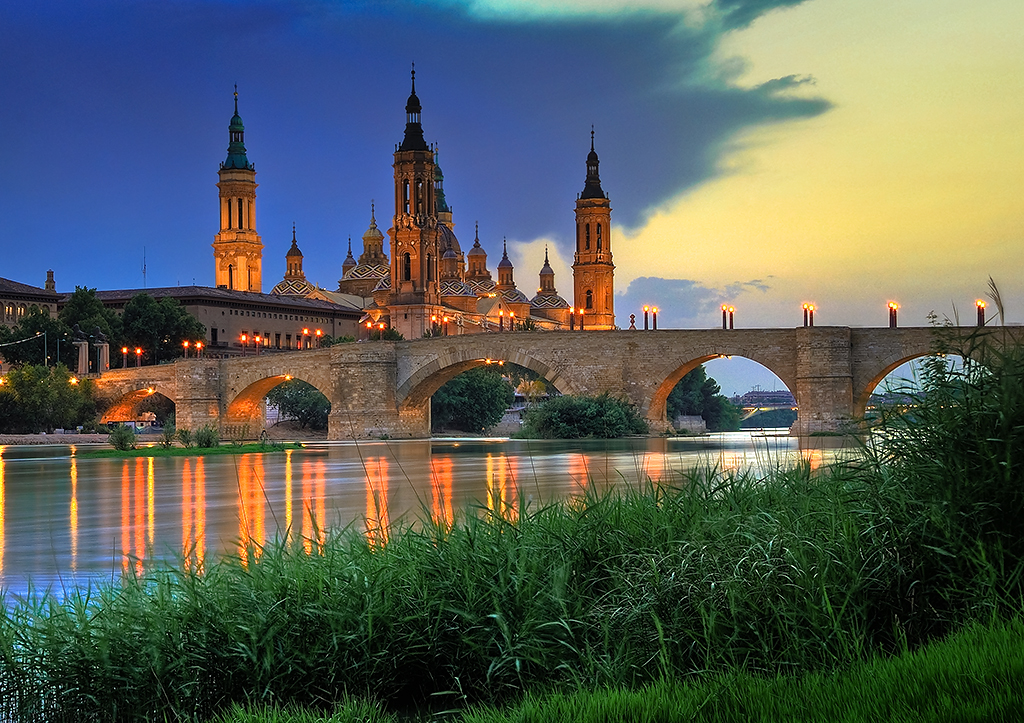
The Ebro River runs through Zaragoza.

Most Aragonese rivers are tributaries of the Ebro River, which is the largest river in Spain and divides the community in two. Of the tributaries of the left bank of the river, the ones originating in the Pyrenees, the Aragón River stands out. Its headwaters are in Huesca, but it ends at the community of Navarre, the Gállego and the Cinca, which joins the Segre just before emptying into the Ebro at the height of Mequinenza. On the right bank, the Jalón, Huerva and Guadalope stand out.

In the stream bed of the Ebro river, near the border with Catalonia, the Mequinenza Reservoir, of 1530 hm^{3} and a length of about 110 km; it is popularly known as the "Sea of Aragon".

The small Pyrenean mountain lakes called ibones merit special mention. These lakes are very scenic, originating during the last glaciation, and are usually found above 2000 m.

The Autonomous Community lies within three hydrographic regions, the Ebro River, the Tagus River (which originates in the Sierra de Albarracín range), and the Júcar, which has as its main river in this community the Turia.

=== Protected spaces ===
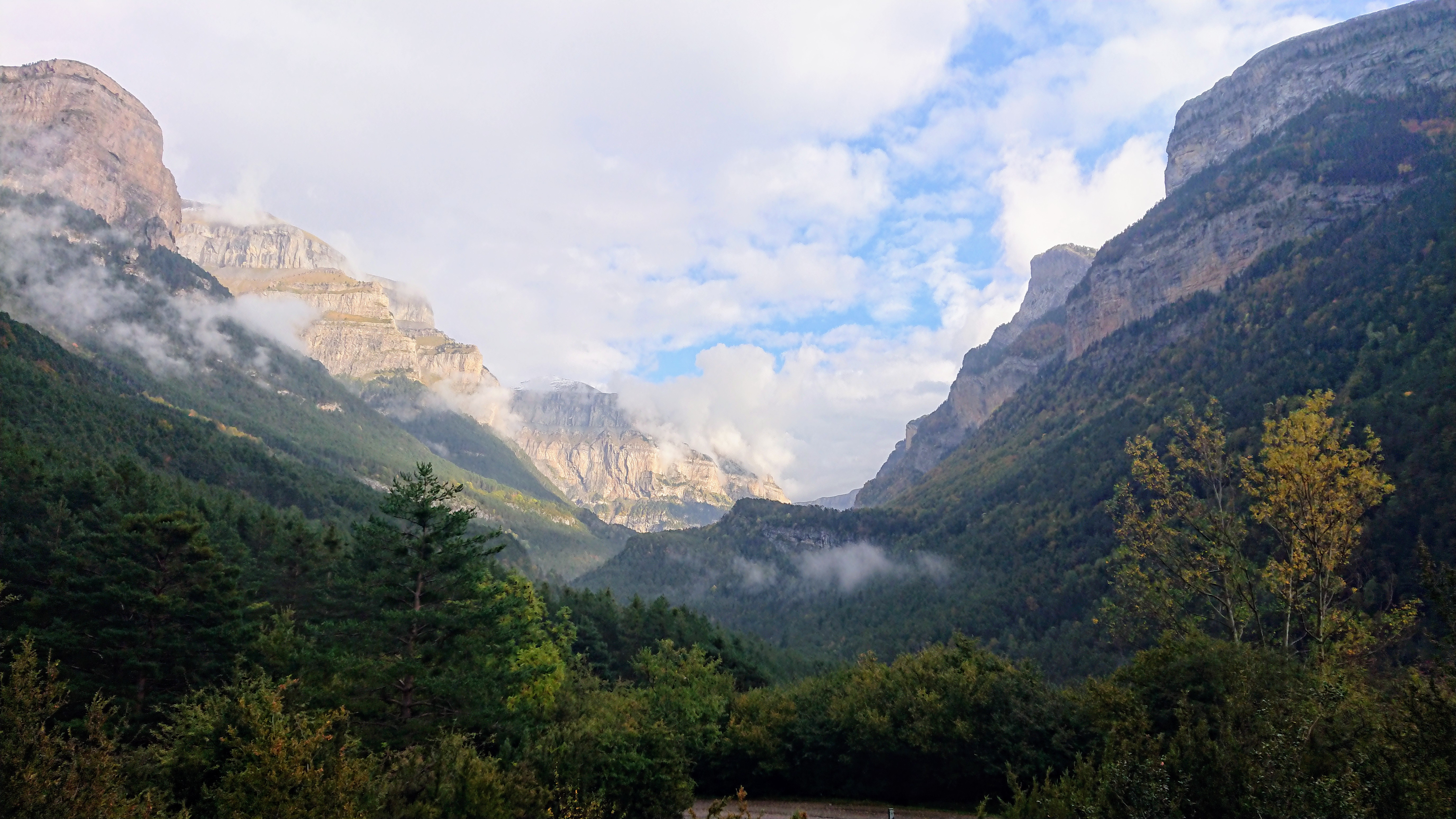
Inside Ordesa Valley, of the Ordesa y Monte Perdido National Park

In Aragon, protected natural spaces are managed through the Red Natural de Aragón, an entity created in 2004 to protect all elements with ecological, landscape and cultural value and at the same time coordinate and establish common standards that contribute to their conservation and sustainable use. In this entity are integrated national parks, natural parks, nature reserves, biosphere reserves and other protected natural areas that have been declared by the autonomous community, the Ramsar Convention or the Natura 2000.

Within the protected areas is the only national park of Aragon: the Ordesa y Monte Perdido National Park, the second national park created in Spain, in 1918, it is found in the Pyrenees in the comarca of Sobrarbe, occupies an area of 15608 ha, a part of the 19679 ha of the peripheral area of protection. It also enjoys other figures of protection like the Biosphere Reserve of Ordesa-Viñamala and is cataloged as a World Heritage Site by UNESCO.

In addition there are 4 other natural parks: the Moncayo Natural Park with an extension of 11144 ha, the Sierra y Cañones de Guara Natural Park with 47453 ha and 33286 ha of peripheral area of protection, the Posets-Maladeta Natural Park with 33440.6 ha and 5920.2 ha of peripheral area of protection, and the Valles Occidentales Natural Park with 27073 ha and 7335 ha of peripheral area of protection.

There are also three nature reserves, five natural monuments and three protected landscapes.

==== Aiguabarreig Segre-Cinca-Ebro ====
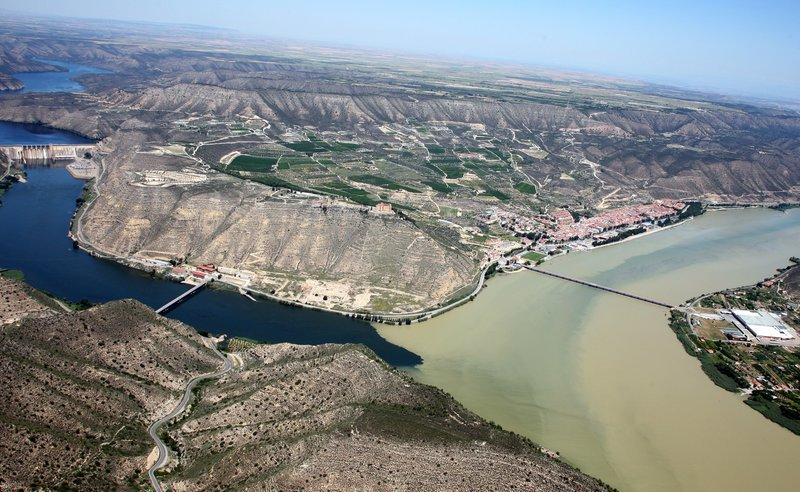
Aerial view of Aiguabarreig in Mequinenza

At the confluence of the Segre and Ebro rivers, the Aiguabarreig Ebro-Segre-Cinca is a space with great natural wealth and a great variety of ecosystems that range from Mediterranean steppes to impenetrable riverside forests, making this space a paradise for biodiversity. Territorially, the Aiguabarreig is at the center of the Middle Depression of the Ebro. It borders to the west with the Monegros, to the east with the Tossals de Montmeneu and Almatret and to the south with the tail of the Ribarroja reservoir. This space is named with Catalan word of origin that designates the place where two or more water streams meet and form one. The Segre and Cinca form a first Aiguabarreig between the towns of La Granja d'Escarp, Massalcoreig and Torrente de Cinca, a few kilometers downstream they converge with the waters of the Ebro, already in the municipality of Mequinenza, forming one of the largest river confluences of the entire Iberian Peninsula.

== Government and politics ==
=== Current political organization ===
As an autonomous community of Spain, Aragon has an elected regional parliament (Spanish: Cortes de Aragón, Aragonese: Cortz d'Aragón, Catalan: Corts d'Aragó) with 67 seats. It meets in the Aljafería, a Moorish palace in the capital city, Zaragoza. The Parliament chooses a President for the Diputación General de Aragón or Aragon Government, for a four-year term. Since 2023, the president is Jorge Azcón of the Partido Popular. Nationally, Aragon elects 13 Deputies and 14 Senators to the Cortes Generales.

In addition to the Spanish political parties, there are a number of Aragonese parties, such as the Chunta Aragonesista, a left-wing Aragonese nationalist party, and the Aragonese Party, more conservative. Chunta Aragonesista had a seat in Spain's national Congress of Deputies from 2000 to 2008, while the centrist Aragonese Party has three national senators, who are in coalition with the ruling People's Party.

In a 2011 regional government survey, 47.6% of the population wanted greater autonomy for Aragon, while 35.2% were satisfied with its current level of autonomy. A total of 6% wanted an end to autonomy and 3.2% wanted full independence.

=== Administrative divisions ===
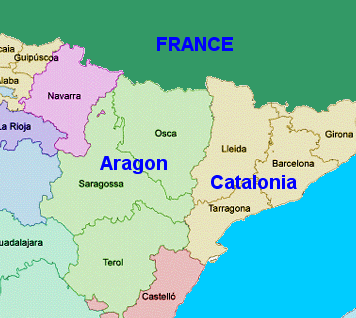
Map of the provinces of Aragon

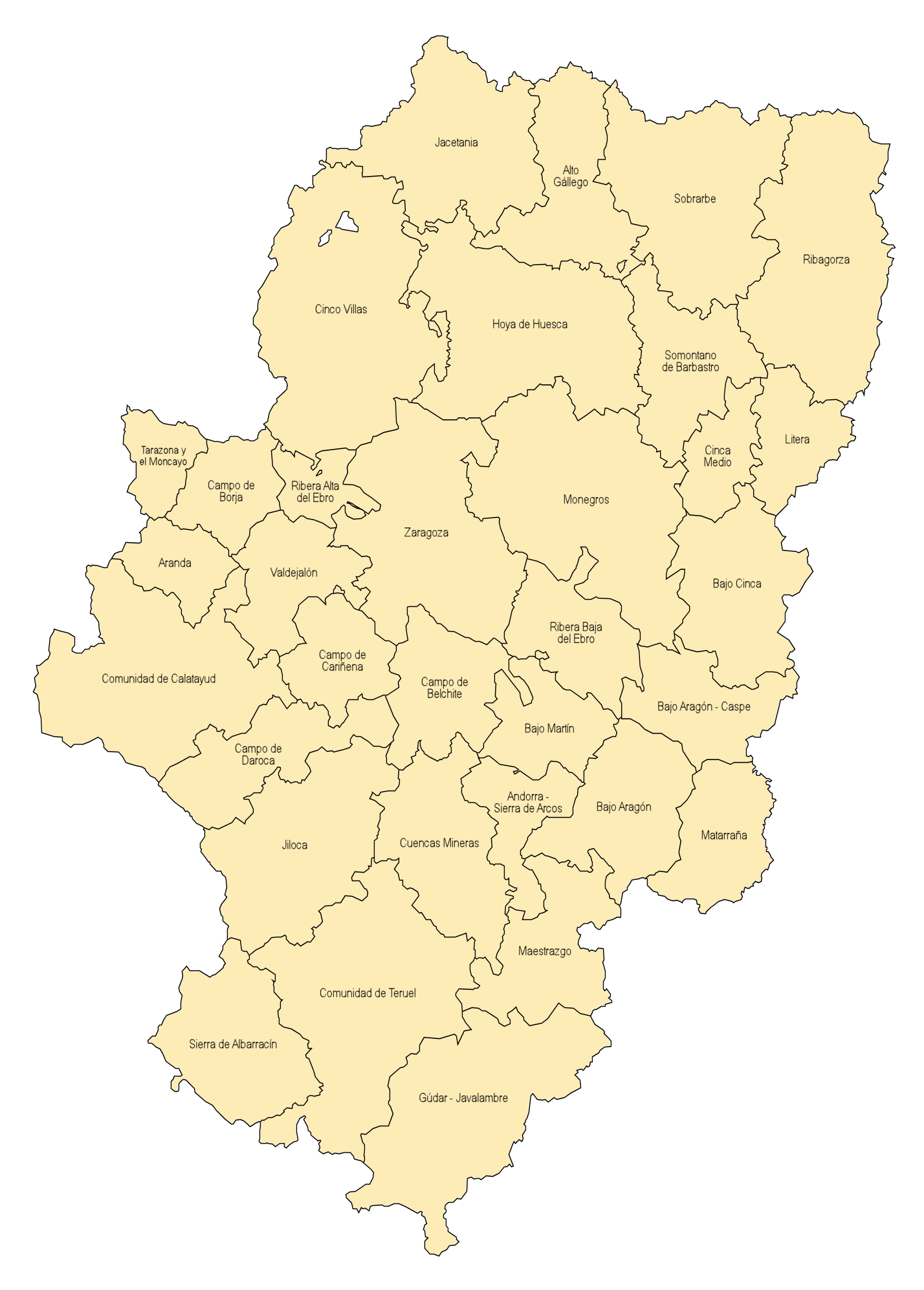
Map of the comarcas of Aragon

Aragon is divided into three provinces from north to south, named after their capitals: Huesca, Zaragoza and Teruel. The provinces are further divided into 33 comarcas, three of which are in more than one province. There are a total of 731 municipalities in the region.

Province	Capital	Population (2025)	Area (km²)	Density (inh.km²)	Municipalities
Huesca	Huesca	230,087	15,637.60	14.7	202
Teruel	Teruel	136,091	14,826.98	9.2	236
Zaragoza	Zaragoza	998,443	17,275.06	57.8	293

=== Historic ===
Aragon in the Middle Ages was the hub of the wider Crown of Aragon. The Crown was represented in the region from 1517 by a viceroy.

In 1479, King Ferdinand II of Aragon married Isabella I of Castile, a kingdom covering much of the rest of modern Spain. However, until the Nueva Planta decrees of 1707, Aragon maintained its own separate laws and institutions.

== Demographics ==
Historical population
Year	Pop.	±%
1842	592,206	—
1857	880,743	+48.7%
1877	907,804	+3.1%
1887	922,554	+1.6%
1900	928,117	+0.6%
1910	980,393	+5.6%
1920	1,028,255	+4.9%
1930	1,051,604	+2.3%
1940	1,067,661	+1.5%
1950	1,090,343	+2.1%
1960	1,098,887	+0.8%
1970	1,153,055	+4.9%
1981	1,196,952	+3.8%
1991	1,188,817	−0.7%
2001	1,204,215	+1.3%
2011	1,344,509	+11.7%
2021	1,331,938	−0.9%
Source: INE

As of 2025, the population is 1,364,621, of which 49.6% are males, and 50.4% are females. Minors make up 16.0% of the population, and seniors make up 22.6%.

The majority of the population of Aragon, 73.2%, lives in the province of Zaragoza. 16.9% lives in the province of Huesca, and 10.0% in the province of Teruel. The population density of the region is the 4th-lowest in Spain after Castilla-La Mancha, Castile and León and Extremadura: only 26.8/km^{2}. The most densely populated areas are around the valley of the river Ebro, particularly around Zaragoza, and in the Pyrenean foothills, while the areas with the fewest inhabitants tend to be those that are higher up in the Pyrenean mountains, and in most of the southern province of Teruel.

Only four cities have a population of more than 20,000: Zaragoza 699,007, Huesca 55,033, Teruel 36,521, and Calatayud 20,152.

=== Languages ===
Distribution of local languages in Aragon. Red: Aragonese, purple: Catalan, yellow: Spanish. Spanish is spoken in all of Aragon, and is the only official language.

Spanish is the native language in most of Aragon, and it is the only official language, understood and spoken by virtually everyone in the region. In addition to it, the Aragonese language continues to be spoken in several local varieties in the mountainous northern counties of the Pyrenees, particularly in western Ribagorza, Sobrarbe, Jacetania and Somontano; it is enjoying a resurgence of popularity as a tool for regional identity. In the easternmost areas of Aragon, along the border with Catalonia, varieties of the Catalan language are spoken, including the comarcas of eastern Ribagorza, La Litera, Bajo Cinca, Bajo Aragón-Caspe, Bajo Aragón and Matarraña. The strip-shaped Catalan-speaking area in Aragon is often called La Franja.

The Declaration of Mequinenza (Declaració de Mequinensa in Catalan) was a document signed on February 1, 1984, in Mequinenza by the mayors of 17 municipalities of the Aragonese Catalan-speaking area together with José Bada Paniello (Minister of Culture of Government of Aragon at the time). Following the declaration, and complying with one of the proposals contained therein, on October 1, 1985, an agreement between the Government of Aragon and the Ministry of Education and Science was implemented for the teaching of the Catalan language as a voluntary and assessable subject in schools in the area.

The Languages Acts of Aragon of 2009 and 2013 have been passed to try to regulate the languages in this autonomous community. An update of these laws was announced but as of 2019 it has not been carried out.

=== Largest cities and towns ===
Largest municipalities in Aragon INE – 2025
Rank		Comarca	Pop.	Rank		Comarca	Pop.
1	Zaragoza	Zaragoza	699,007	11	Cuarte de Huerva	Zaragoza	15,380
2	Huesca	Huesca	55,033	12	Jaca	Huesca	14,012
3	Teruel	Teruel	36,521	13	Tarazona	Zaragoza	10,872
4	Calatayud	Zaragoza	20,152	14	Caspe	Zaragoza	10,405
5	Utebo	Zaragoza	19,135	15	Binéfar	Huesca	10,169
6	Monzón	Huesca	18,465	16	Sabiñánigo	Huesca	9,665
7	Barbastro	Huesca	17,799	17	Zuera	Zaragoza	8,714
8	Ejea de los Caballeros	Zaragoza	17,219	18	La Almunia de Doña Godina	Zaragoza	8,044
9	Alcañiz	Teruel	16,447	19	Alagón	Zaragoza	7,520
10	Fraga	Huesca	15,400	20	Andorra	Teruel	7,192

=== Immigration ===
Foreign population by country of birth (2025)
Country of birth	Population
Romania	40,890
Morocco	29,585
Colombia	27,245
Nicaragua	15,118
Ecuador	14,668
Venezuela	13,247
Peru	7,994
Algeria	7,338
Senegal	6,320
Dominican Republic	6,220
Cuba	6,188
Argentina	5,992
China	5,176
Ukraine	4,574
Honduras	4,570

As of 2025, immigrants make up 18.8% of the population. The 5 largest foreign countries of birth are Romania, Morocco, Colombia, Nicaragua, and Ecuador.

== Culture ==
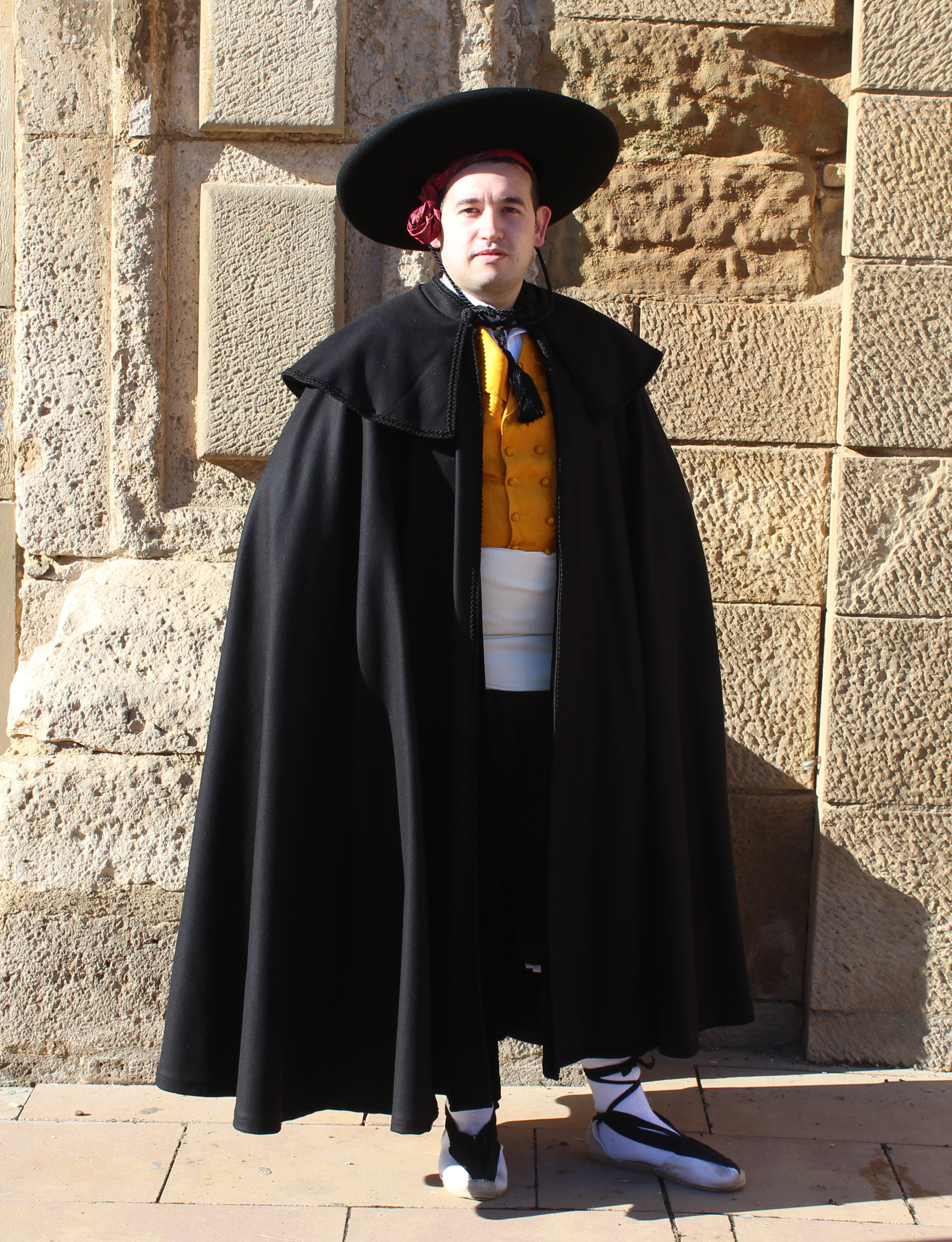
The Fragatina costume historical of Fraga

Some medieval monuments of Teruel and Zaragoza are protected by UNESCO as part of the World Heritage Sites Mudéjar Architecture of Aragon.

The traditional dance of Aragon is known as jota and is one of the faster Spanish dances. It is also the most widespread in Aragon and the exact style and music depend on the area.

There are other less popular dances named "paloteaos" similar to the sword/stick dances of other regions.

The music to one local dance, "The Dance of Majordomos" of Benasque, was so enjoyed by Rafael del Riego on a visit to the town that he ordered it to be copied resulting in the "Hymn of Riego".

Typical Aragonese instruments include the stringed drum or "Chicotén", bagpipes such as the "gaita de boto", oboes such as the "Dulzaina", and small flutes like the "Chiflo". Some instruments have been lost, such as the "trompa de Ribagorza", although there have been efforts to reconstruct them. In contrast to other Pyrenean regions, the "Chicotén" and "Chiflo" never have stopped being played.

The Carnival of Bielsa (Huesca) has ancient origins and includes a group of men carrying long sticks, wearing skirts, cowbells and boucard/goat-like horns and skins with black-painted faces called "Trangas" symbolising "virility" who surround another man wearing skins playing the part of a bear called "l'onso". In Aragonese mythology the bear carried souls between the world of the living and the world of the dead. Trangas dance with young females named "madamas" symbolising "purity" and wearing colourful dresses. Other traditional figures include a horse rider named "Caballé".

=== Cuisine ===
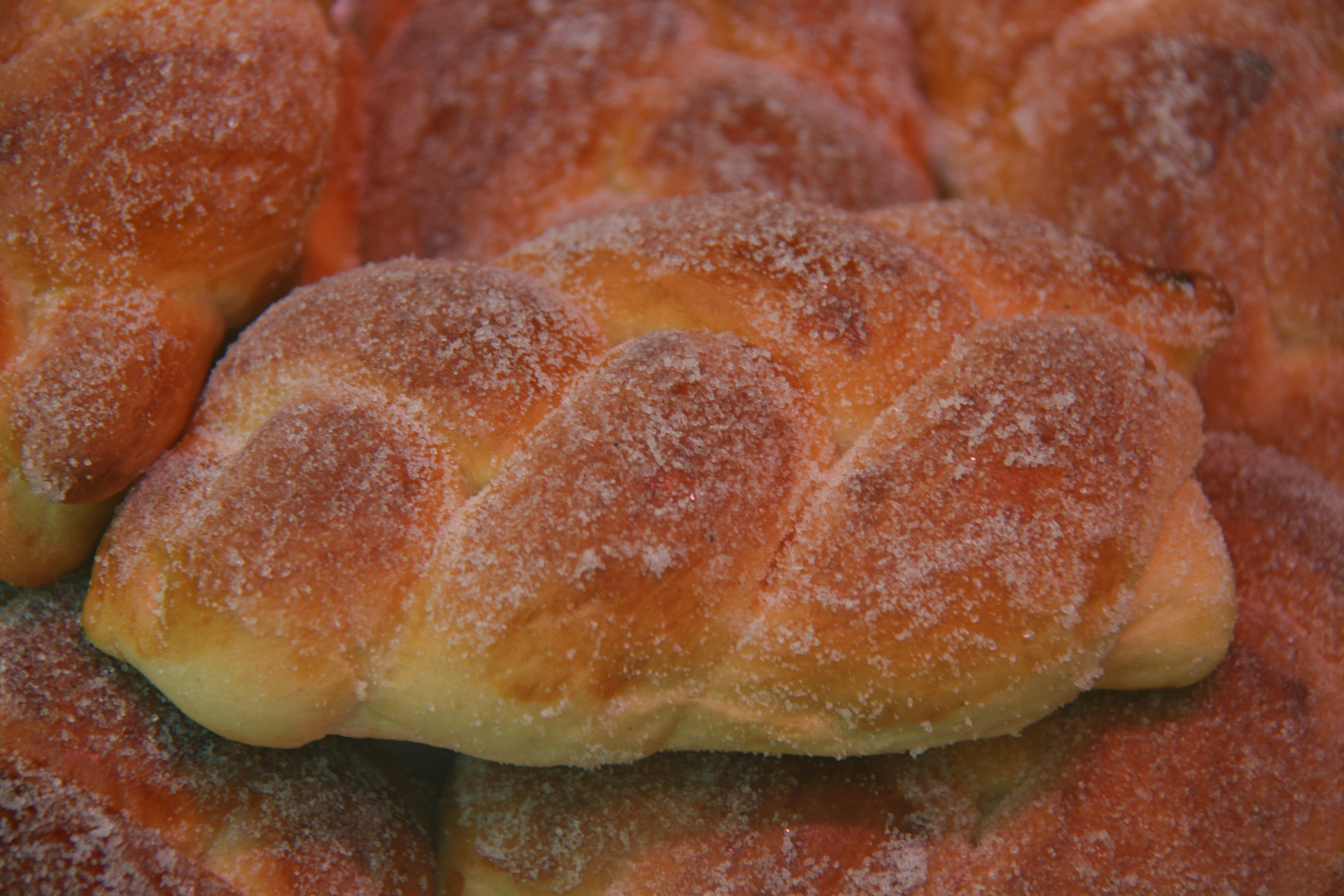
Trenza de Almudevar

With its vast Pyrenean pastures, lamb, beef, and dairy products are, not surprisingly, predominant in Aragonese cuisine. Also of note is its ham from Teruel; olive oil from Empeltre and Arbequina; longaniza from Graus; rainbow trout and salmon, boar, truffles and wild mushrooms from the upper river valleys of the Jacetania, Gallego, Sobrarbe, and Ribagorza regions; and wines from Cariñena, Somontano, Calatayud, and Campo de Borja; and fruit, especially peaches, from its fertile lower valleys. The region also features a unique local haggis, known as chireta, several interesting seafood dishes, including various crab pastes, which developed from an old superstition that crabs help prevent illness, and sweets such as "Adoquines del Pilar" and "Frutas de Aragón". There are also other sweets like "Tortas de alma" from Teruel and "Trenza de Almudevar" or "Castañas de Huesca" from Huesca.

=== Symbols ===
First testimony of the coat of arms of Aragon. Fabricio Vagad, printed in Zaragoza in 1499 by Pablo Hurus

The current coat of arms of Aragon is composed of the four barracks and is attested for the first time in 1499, consolidating since the Early Modern Ages to take root decisively in the 19th century and be approved, according to precept, by the Real Academia de la Historia in 1921.

The first quartering appears at the end of the 15th century and commemorates, according to traditional interpretation, the legendary kingdom of Sobrarbe; in the second quarter there is the so-called "Cross of Íñigo Arista", innovation of Peter IV of Aragon (from an anachronistic interpretation of the cross that symbolized the religion of the Asturian, Navarrese and Aragonese Christian kings), who took it as shields of the ancient kings of Aragon, although historically there were no heraldic emblems in the peninsula (or "signal shields", as it was said in the Middle Ages) before the union dynastic of 1137 of the House of Aragon with the House of Barcelona; in the third quartering appears the Saint George's Cross escutcheoned of four heads of Moors (the call "Cross of Alcoraz"), that is witnessed for the first time in a seal of 1281 of Peter III of Aragon and would remember, according to tradition arising from the 14th century, the battle in which Peter I of Aragon and Pamplona and the future Alfonso I of Aragon took Huesca and was considered in the Early modern Ages one of the proprietary emblems of the kingdom of Aragon; and in the fourth is the emblem of the so-called "bars of Aragon" or Royal Sign of Aragon, the oldest of the heraldic emblems that are part of the current coat of arms, dated in the second half of the 12th century.

This emblem of gules and gold was used in seals, banners, shields and standards indistinctly, not being but a familiar emblem that later denoted the authority as King of Aragon until, with the birth of Modern State, began to be a territorial symbol.

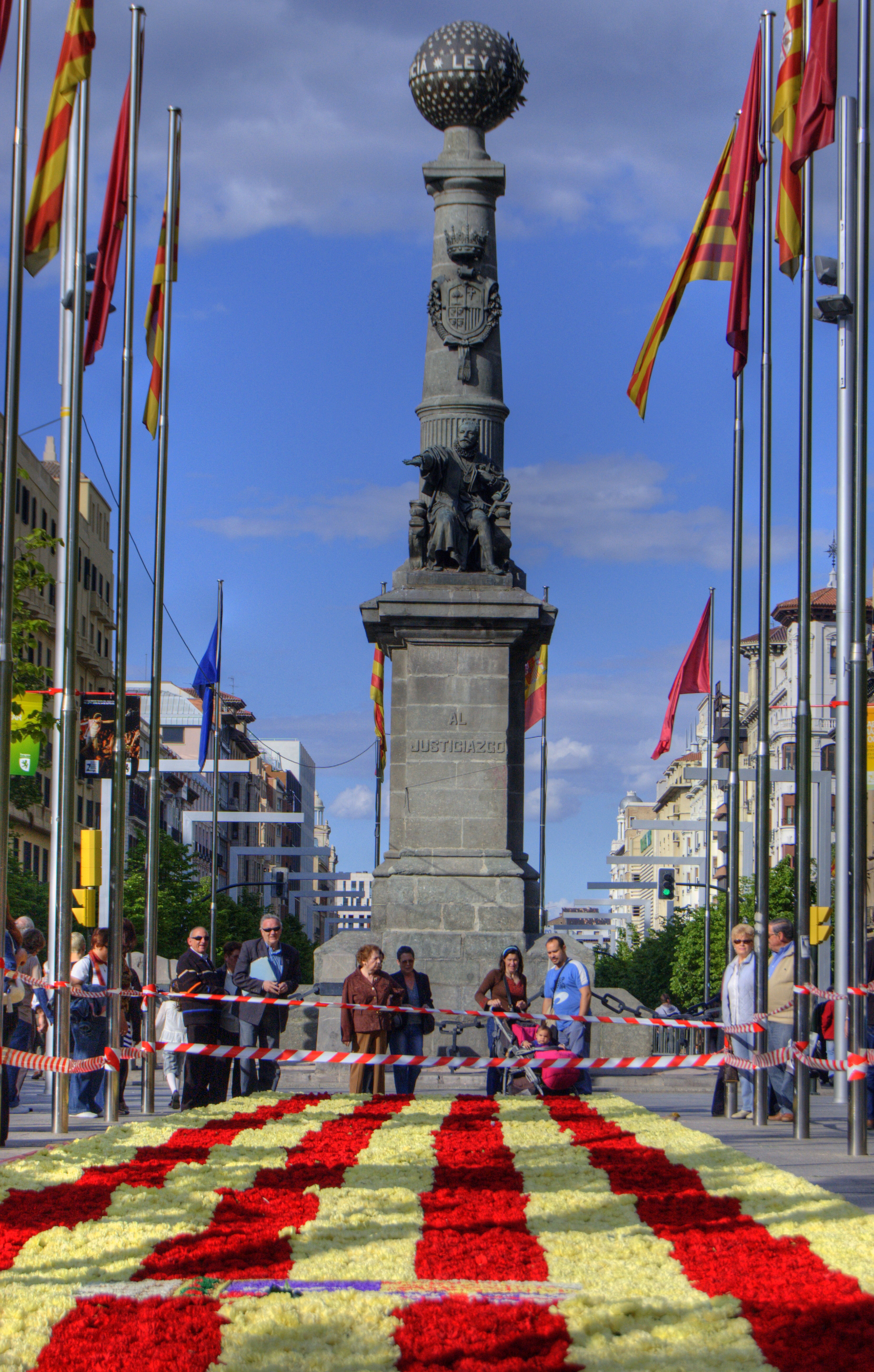
La Plaza de Aragón square in Zaragoza, on Saint George's Day, with a flag of Aragon of flowers

The current flag was approved in 1984, with the provisions of Article 3 of the Statute of Autonomy of Aragon, the flag is the traditional of the four horizontal red bars on a yellow background with the coat of arms of Aragon shifted towards the flagpole.

The bars of Aragon, common historic element of the current four autonomous communities that once were integrated into the Crown of Aragon, present in the third quartering of the coat of arms of Spain.

The anthem of Aragon (himno de Aragón) was regulated in 1989 with music by the Aragonese composer Antón García Abril that combines the old Aragonese musical tradition with popular musical elements within a modern conception. The lyrics were elaborated by the Aragonese poets Ildefonso Manuel Gil, Ángel Guinda, Rosendo Tello and Manuel Vilas and highlights within its poetic framework, values such as freedom, justice, reason, truth, open land ... that historically represent the expression of Aragon as a people. Another song, Canto a la libertad, is often regarded as the de facto unofficial anthem of Aragon.

The Day of Aragon is celebrated on April 23 and commemorates Saint George, patron of the Kingdom of Aragon since the 15th century. It appears in Article 3 of the Statute of Autonomy of Aragon since 1984. Institutional acts such as the delivery of the Aragon Awards by the Government of Aragon or the composition of a flag of Aragon of flowers, with the collaboration of citizens, in the Plaza de Aragón square of Zaragoza.

== Economy ==
GDP per capita in Aragon is above average for Spain. The Gross domestic product (GDP) of the autonomous community was 37.0 billion euros in 2018, accounting for 3.1% of Spanish economic output. GDP per capita adjusted for purchasing power was 30,200 euros or 100% of the EU27 average in the same year. The GDP per employee was 101% of the EU average.

The traditional agriculture-based economy from the mid-20th century has been greatly transformed in the past several decades and now service and industrial sectors are the backbone of the economy in the region.

The well-developed irrigation system around the Ebro has greatly supported the productive agriculture. The most important crops include wheat, barley, rye, fruit and grapes. Livestock-breeding is essential especially in the northern areas, where the lush meadows provide excellent conditions for sheep and cattle. As of November 2020 the regional livestock includes 8.8 million pigs (around six pigs per person), and, as of January 2021, 73.1 million gallifowls. Also as of November 2020, there were more than 1.6 million sheep and about 50,000 goats, as well as about 400,000 head of cattle, most of them in Huesca province. According to Greenpeace, 30% of the Aragonese territory is endangered by liquid manure from intensive farming, putting aquifers and other water reserves at risk.

The chief industrial centre is the capital Zaragoza, where the largest factories are located. The largest plant is the Opel automotive plant with 8730 employees and production of 200000 per year. It supports many related industries in the area. Other large plants in the city include factories for trains and household appliances. Mining of iron ore and coal is developed to the south, near Ojos Negros. Electricity production is concentrated to the north where numerous hydro power plants are located along the Pyrenean rivers and in the 1150 MW Teruel Power Plant. There is an aluminium refinery in the town of Sabiñánigo. The main centres of electronics industry are Zaragoza, Huesca and Benabarre. Chemical industry is developed in Zaragoza, Sabiñánigo, Monzón, Teruel, Ojos Negros, Fraga, Benabarre and others.

The transport infrastructure has been greatly improved. There are more than 900 km of motorways which run from Zaragoza to Madrid, Teruel, Basque country, Huesca and Barcelona. The condition of the other roads is also good. As of 2016 there are 899008 cars in Aragon. Through the territory of the province runs the new high-speed railway between Madrid and Barcelona with siding from Zaragoza to Huesca, which is going to be continued to the French border. There is an International Airport at Zaragoza and a smaller airport at Huesca. The Teruel Airport is used for maintenance purposes, and the small airfields at Santa Cilia and Villanueva de Gállego are used for recreational flights.

The unemployment rate stood at 11.6% in 2017 and was lower than the national average.

Year	2006	2007	2008	2009	2010	2011	2012	2013	2014	2015	2016	2017
Unemployment rate (in %)	5.5	5.3	7.3	13.1	15.0	17.1	18.7	21.4	20.2	16.3	14.7	11.6

== Research ==
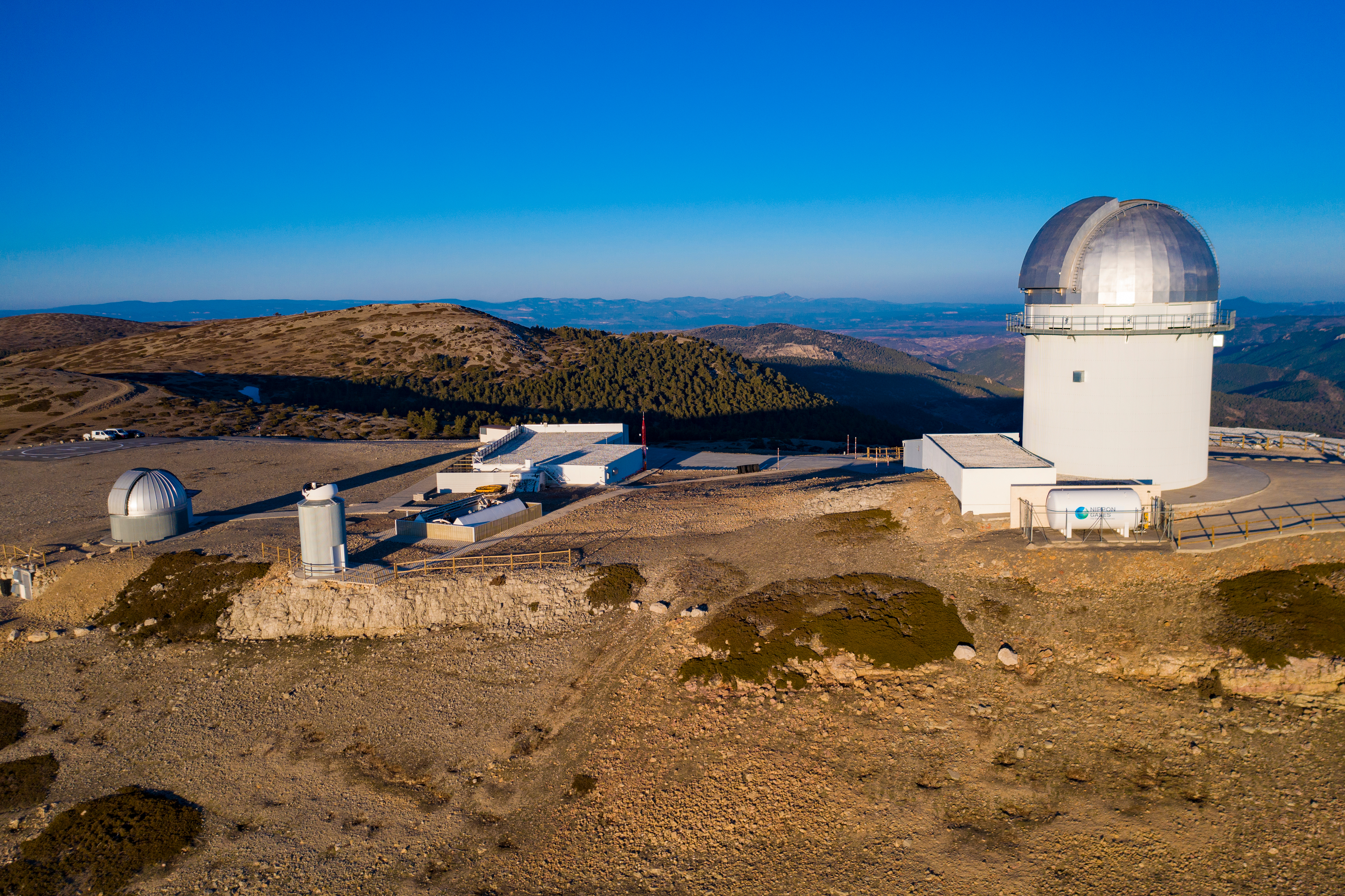
Astrophysical Observatory of Javalambre located in the Teruel province of Aragon, and operated by CEFCA.

The University of Zaragoza is the largest university in Aragon, which conduct research in various disciplines. Of the Nationally recognized Unique Scientific and Technical Infrastructure research institutes, Aragon hosts the following:

- Astrophysical Observatory of Javalambre (OAJ), which is located in the Javalambre mountain range, south of the Teruel province. OAJ is managed by the Center for Physics Studies of the Cosmos of Aragon (CEFCA), which is located in the Teruel city.
- Canfranc Underground Laboratory, located in the north of the Huesca province and is managed by a consortium of the Aragon and national governments and the University of Zaragoza.

== Media ==
Aragon has media set-ups in television, radio and numerous newspapers.

=== Television ===
On 21 April 2006, regional television broadcasts in Aragon officially began with the launch of Aragón TV. The law which established the CARTV (Aragon Corporation Radio and Television) dated from 1987, but various political disputes delayed the project for several legislatures.

During the years that Aragon had no public television, several media groups sought to supplement their absence. For one TVE-Aragon, taking the Territorial Centre in Zaragoza, produced several programs and educational activities with the Aragonese town. As for private groups, there were several projects. The most widely accepted for many years had been Antena Aragón, which came to be regarded as regional television. This channel was created in 1998 and disappeared in 2005 shortly after having to leave the Media Production Centre (CPA), as this was built by the DGA for future public television host Aragon. With the push for the creation of public television, Antena Aragón merged with RTVA (Radio Television Aragonesa) belonging to the Herald Group. Merging RTVA Antena Aragón and led to channel ZTV (Zaragoza Television). Moreover, Antena 3 Televisión aired for several years, and off to Aragon, a news report fully Aragonese, having a central issue in the Pinares de Venecia in Zaragoza, within the premises of the Theme Park of Zaragoza.

Aragón TV was launched in 2006 after spending a season broadcasting a letter and a loop with images of Aragonese villages and audio of regional radio programs.

=== Radio ===
Aragon Radio, began broadcasting on 18 August 2005 at 5 p.m. with the sound of drums and drums of Calanda and a group song Zaragoza "The Fish". Estimates of its audience range from 20 000 listeners, according to the latest EMG, to 70000, according to private findings. The channel has regional news bulletins every hour from 7 a.m. to midnight and coverage of sports.

== Sport ==
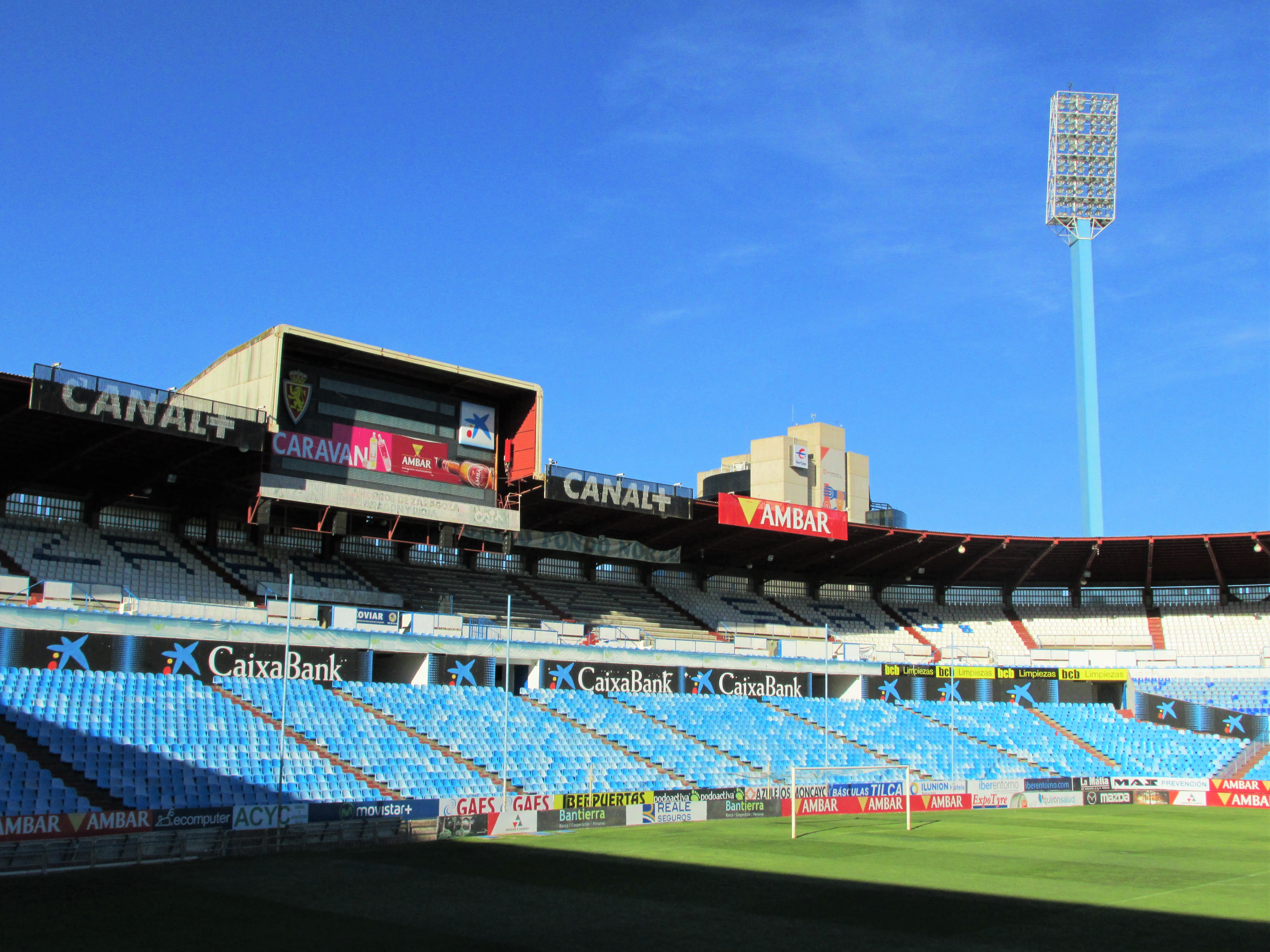
La Romareda, home ground of Real Zaragoza

Aragon's most successful football club is Real Zaragoza. The club was founded in 1932 and spent 58 seasons in First Division, having played at its current ground, La Romareda, since 1957. Real Zaragoza have won six Copa del Rey titles from 1964 to 2004, and the 1995 European Cup Winners' Cup. The other most important football team in Aragon is SD Huesca, that in 2018 and 2020 was able to promote to first division. Now, SD Huesca is still playing in second division after being relegated two times. CD Teruel was able to promote in the 2022/2023 season from segunda federación (Spanish 4th division) to primera federación (Spanish 3rd division) There are plenty of smaller clubs in the region playing in semi-professional and amateur competitions.

Skiing is popular in the Pyrenean north of Aragon, at resorts such as Formigal and Candanchú. The Aragonese city of Jaca in the Pyrenees bid to host the Winter Olympics from 2002 to 2014. Zaragoza was considering a bid for the 2022 Winter Olympics, but dropped it in 2011 to strengthen the chance of Barcelona winning the games.

The Ciudad del Motor de Aragón, also known as Motorland Aragón, is a motorsport race track located near Alcañiz in Aragon. It is home to the Aragon motorcycle Grand Prix.

== Notable people ==
=== Up to the 19th century ===
- Saint Elizabeth of Portugal (1271–1336), queen consort of Portugal and a saint of the Roman Catholic Church
- Antipope Benedict XIII (1328–1423), known as Papa Luna, Avignon pope and art patron-sponsor
- King Ferdinand II of Aragon (1452–1516), married queen Isabella I of Castile and united the Crown of Aragon with the Crown of Castile, giving form to the actual Spain
- Michael Servetus (1509/11–1553), theologian and physician who received numerous charges of heresy by both Catholics and Protestants and was burnt at the stake in Calvin's Geneva during the 16th century
- Joseph Calasanz (1557–1648), Catholic priest who dedicated himself to the education of poor boys at Rome and founded a society pledged to that work
- Baltasar Gracián (1601–1658), writer of Spanish Baroque literature
- Pablo Bruna (1611–1679), blind composer, organist
- Gaspar Sanz (1640–1710), composer, guitarist and organist
- Rocque Joaquin de Alcubierre (1702–1780), military engineer who discovered the ruins of Pompeii
- Francisco Garcés (1738–1781), missionary priest to North America who founded two pueblo missions
- Francisco de Goya (1746–1828) 18th-century painter.

=== 20th and 21st centuries ===
- Eva Amaral Lallana, singer-songwriter and member of the rock band Amaral
- Enrique Bunbury (Enrique Ortiz de Landázuri Izarduy), rock singer-songwriter for Héroes del Silencio and Enrique Bunbury Band
- Luis Buñuel Portolés, filmmaker
- St. Josemaría Escrivá de Balaguer y Albás, Spanish Catholic priest, founder of Opus Dei
- Pablo Gargallo Catalán, sculptor and painter
- Jesús Moncada Estruga, writer
- Ramon J. Sender Garcés, writer
- José Antonio Labordeta Subías, singer, writer, politician (deputy) and TV presenter
- Santiago Ramón y Cajal, Nobel Prize in Physiology or Medicine recipient for his research on the human brain and nervous system
- Carlos Saura Atarés, filmmaker
- Pablo Serrano Aguilar, sculptor
- Alberto Zapater Arjol, footballer
- María Pilar León Cebrián, footballer
- Teresa Perales Fernández, Paralympic swimmer, politician and university professor
- Fernando Simón Soria, epidemiologist and director of the Coordination Centre for Health Alerts and Emergencies of the Spanish Ministry of Health during the ebola and COVID-19 outbreaks
- Federico Jiménez Losantos, radio presenter and right wing pundit
- Sheila Herrero Lapuente, inline speed skater
- Antón García Abril, music composer
- Soledad Puértolas Villanueva, writer, member of the Royal Spanish Academy and winner of the Premio Planeta de Novela
- Juan Alberto Belloch Julbe, judge, former Spanish Minister of Justice and of Justice and Interior, former mayor of Zaragoza, former deputy and senator and former member of the General Council of the Judiciary
- Luisa Fernanda Rudi Úbeda, senator, former and first female President of the Congress of the Deputies, former and first female President of Aragon, former and first female mayor of Zaragoza, former deputy, MEP and autonomic deputy and former president of the Aragonese People's Party
- Marcelino Iglesias Ricou, former President of Aragon, former senator and autonomic deputy and former secretary-general of the Socialists' Party of Aragon and former member of the executive committee of the PSOE
- Román Escolano Olivares, economist, former Spanish Minister of Economy, Industry and Competitiveness and former vice-president of the European Investment Bank
- Miki (Miguel) Nadal Furriel, comedian, actor and TV presenter
- Luisa Gavasa Moragón, actress
- Hana Jalloul Muro, university professor, politician and Secretary of State of Migrations
- Guitarricadelafuente (Álvaro Lafuente Calvo), singer-songwriter, guitarist and musician
- Ara Malikian, violinist
- Ana Santos Aramburo, librarian and director of the National Library of Spain
- José Luis Gil Sanz, television, cinema, theatre and voice actor
- Alexandra Jiménez Arrechea, actress and TV presenter
- Conchita Martínez Bernat, tennis player
- Pilar Palomero, film director and screenwriter
- Paco Martínez Soria, actor and theatre entrepreneur
- Miguel Ángel Tirado Vinués (also known as "Marianico el Corto"), comedian and actor
- Violadores del Verso, rap music crew
- Álvaro Arbeloa Coca, footballer
- Juan Antonio San Epifanio Ruiz (most commonly known as "Epi"), basketball player
- Manuel Pizarro Moreno, economist, jurist and former politician (deputy)

== Gallery ==
Aragon gallery

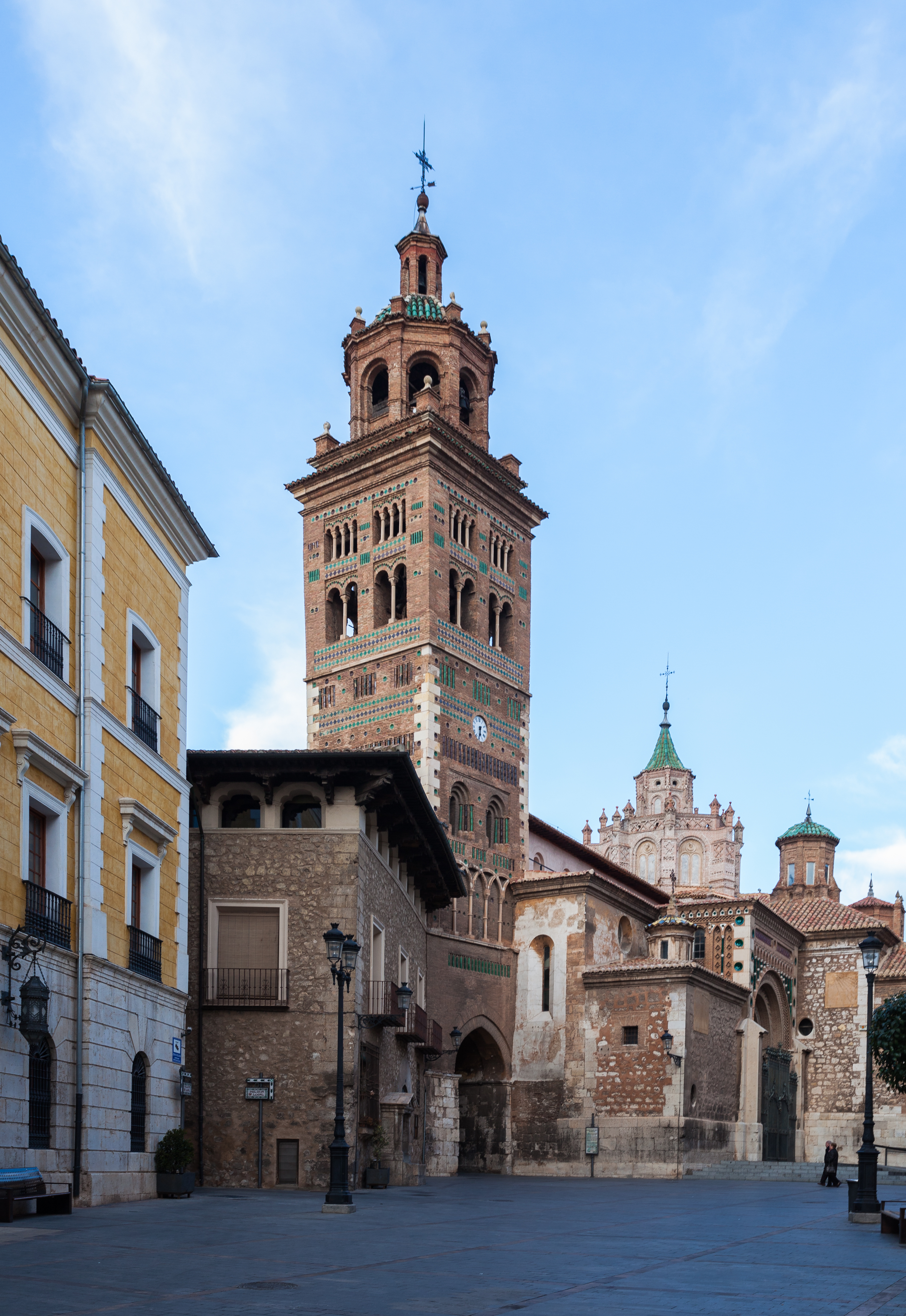
Teruel Cathedral in Teruel

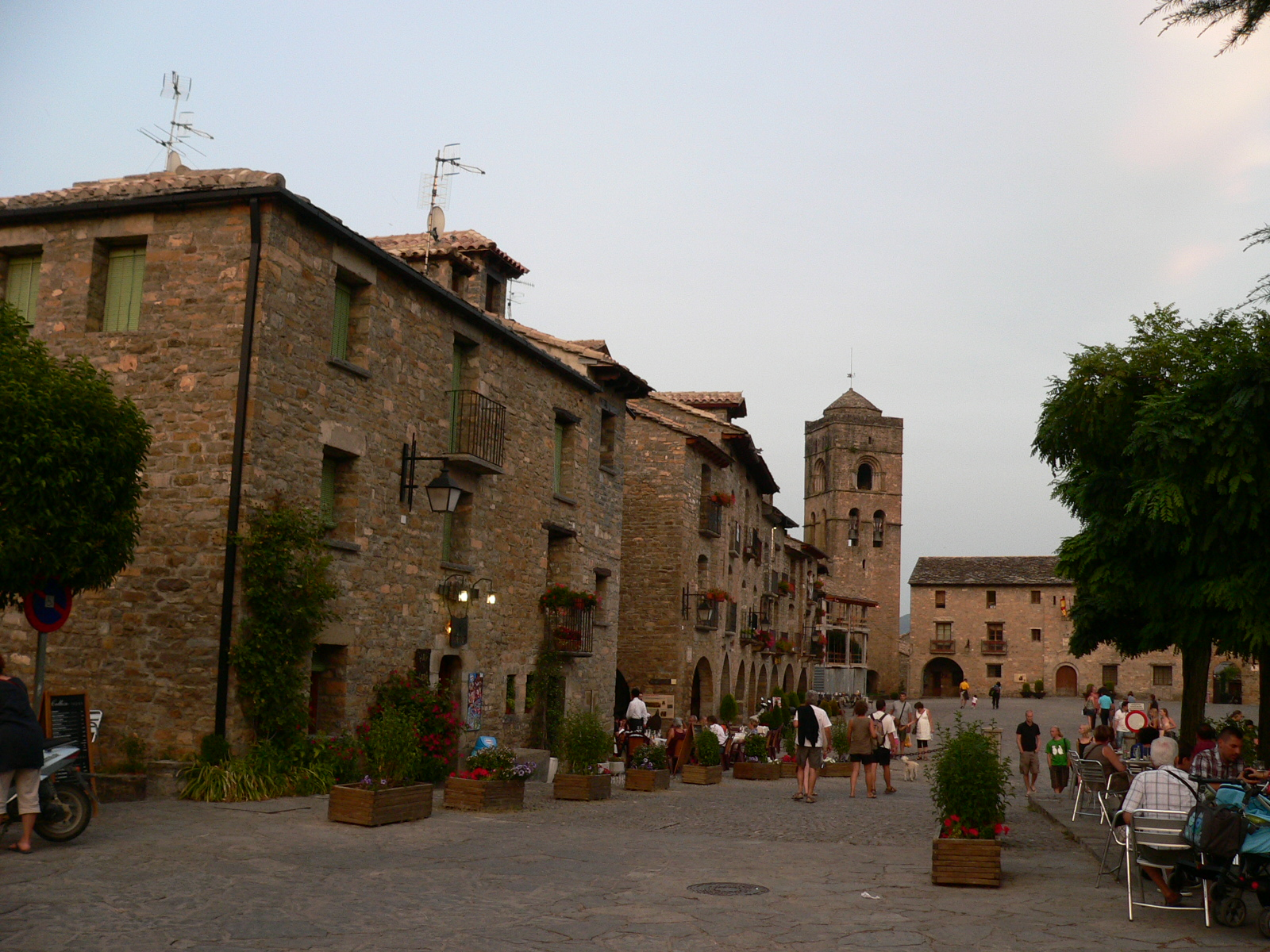
Aínsa, Aínsa-Sobrarbe

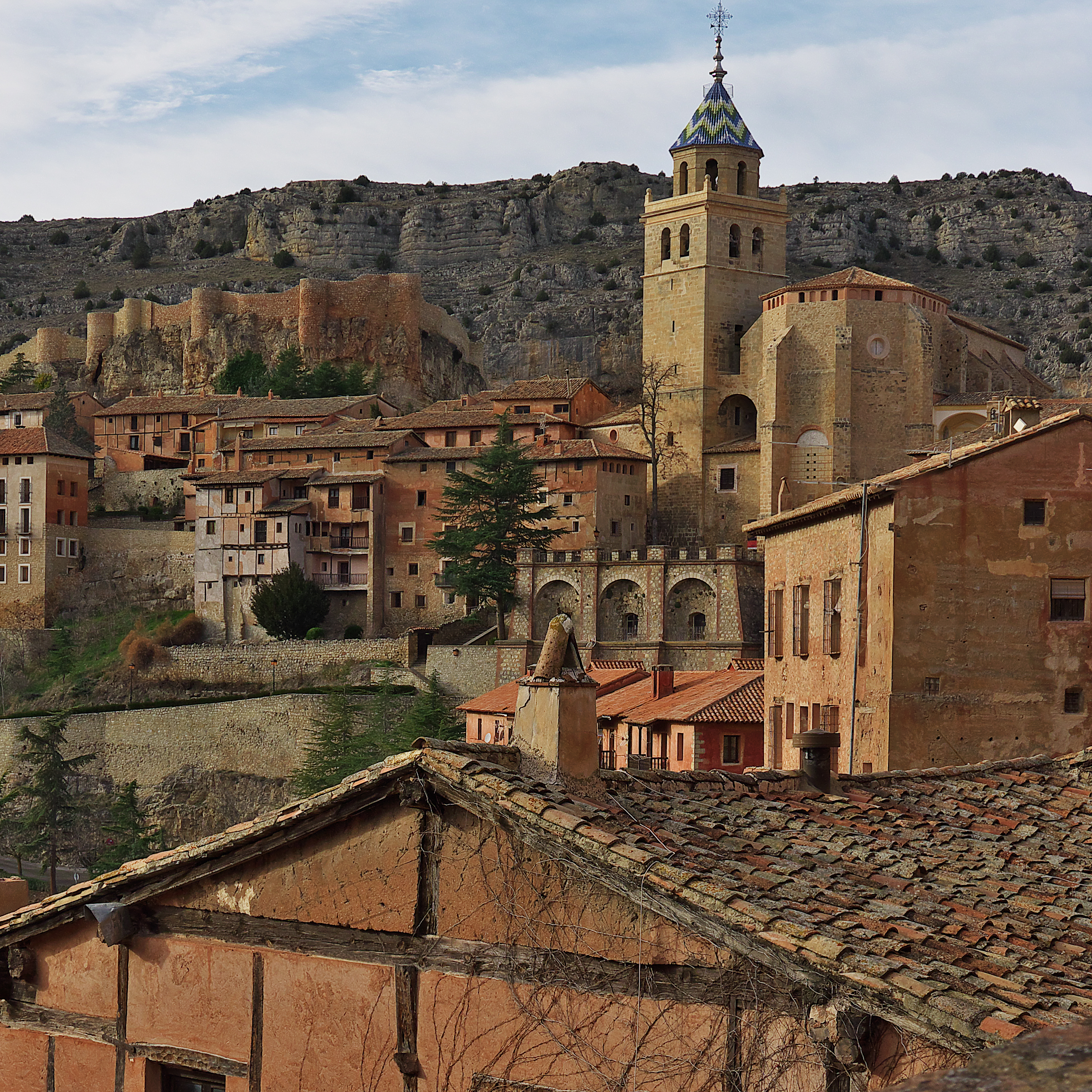
Albarracín

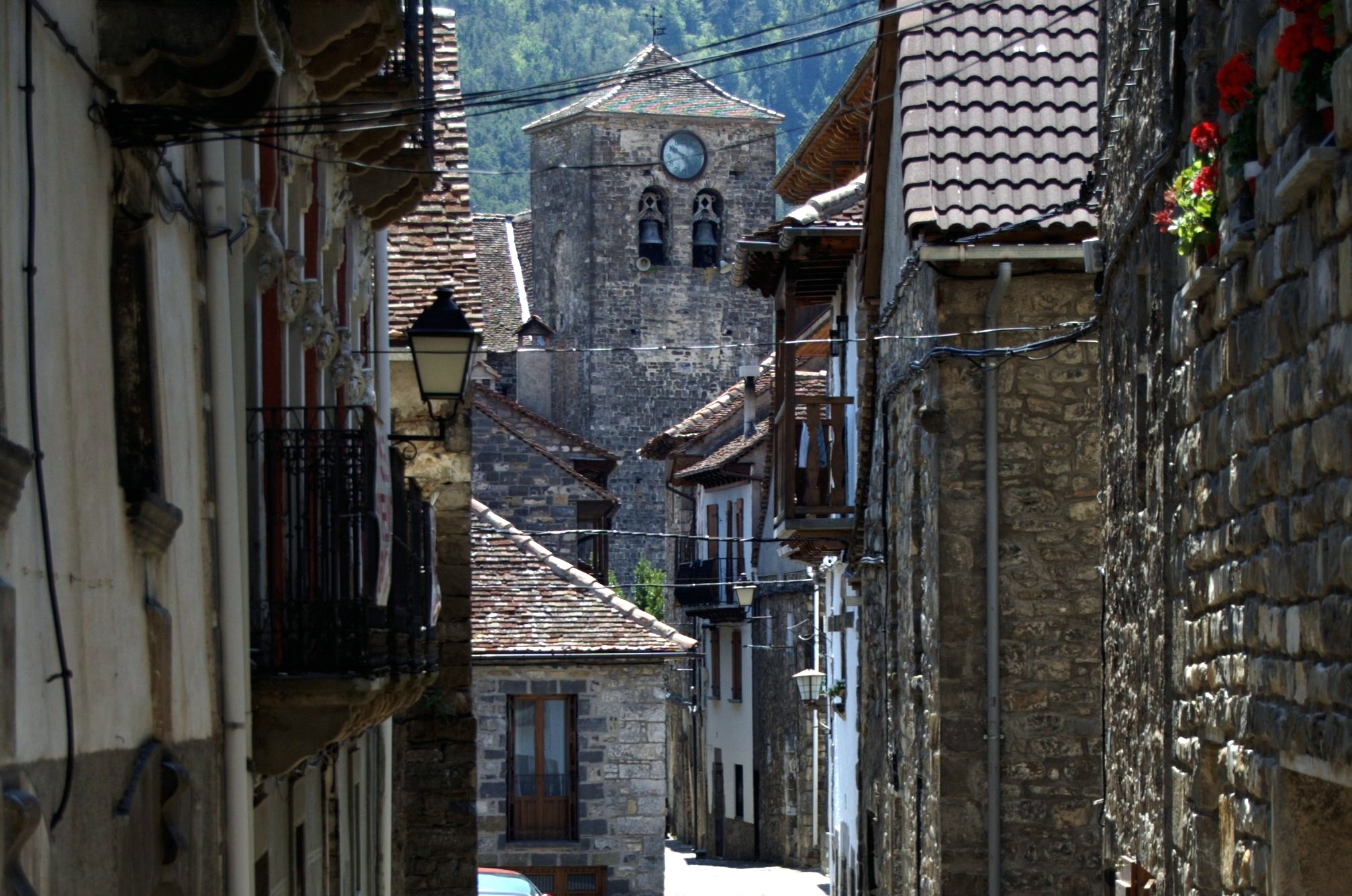
Ansó

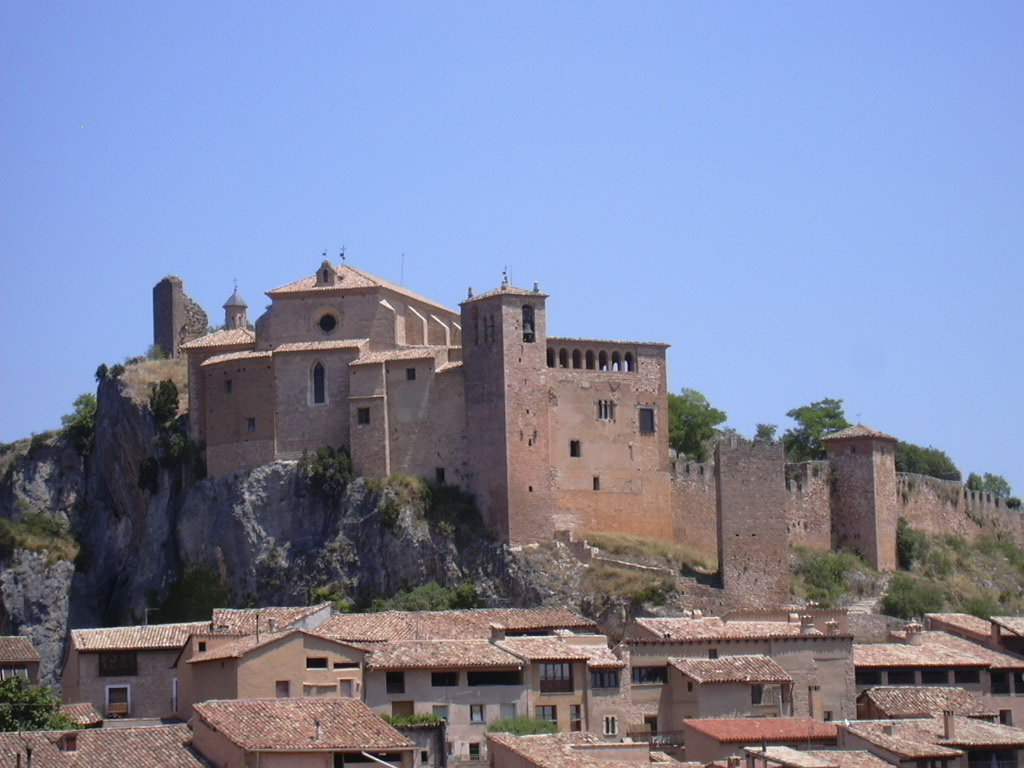
Collegiate Church of Santa María la Mayor in Alquézar

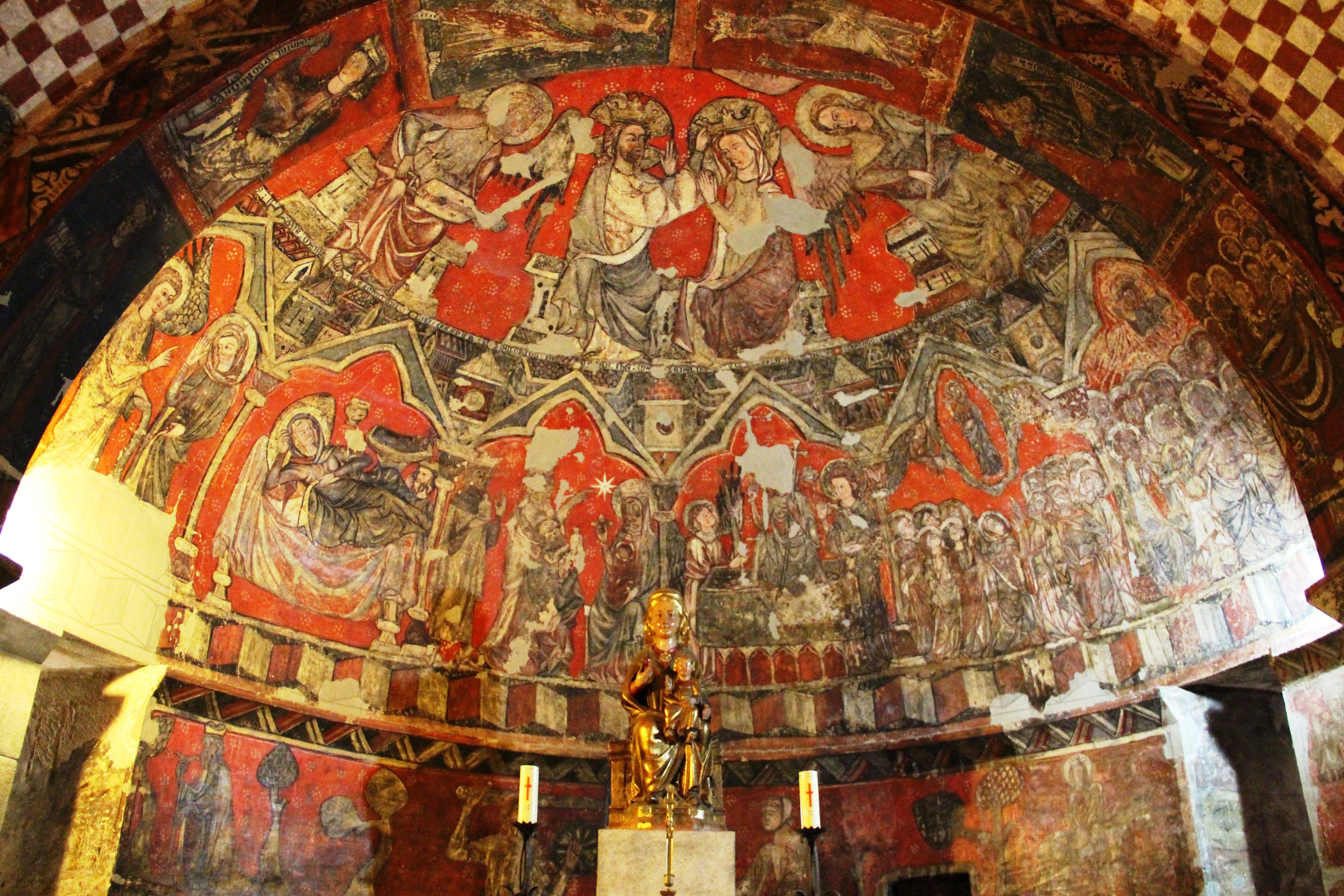
Gothic murals of the Crypt of Santa María del Perdón of the Church of San Esteban in Sos del Rey Católico

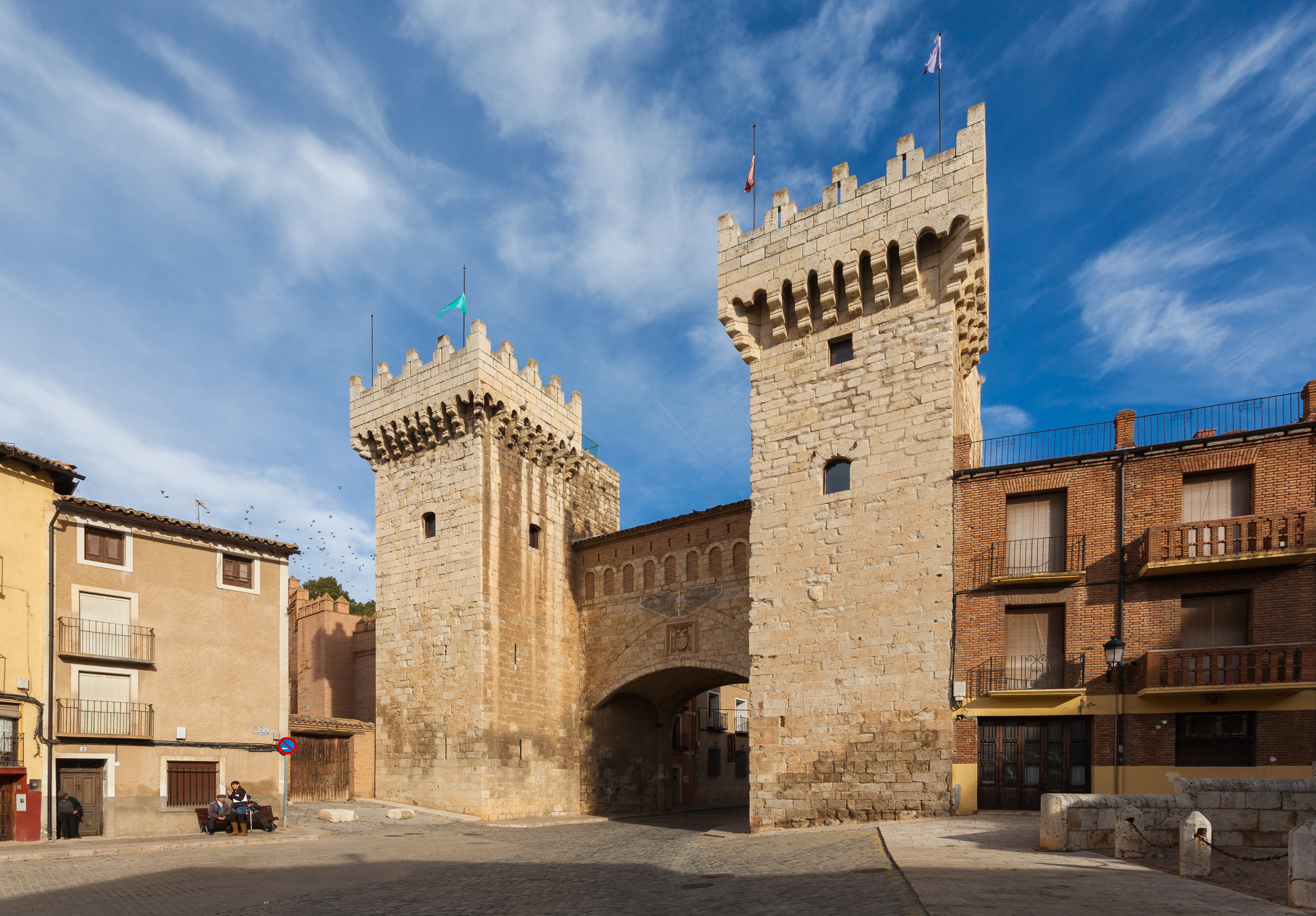
Puerta Baja gate in Daroca

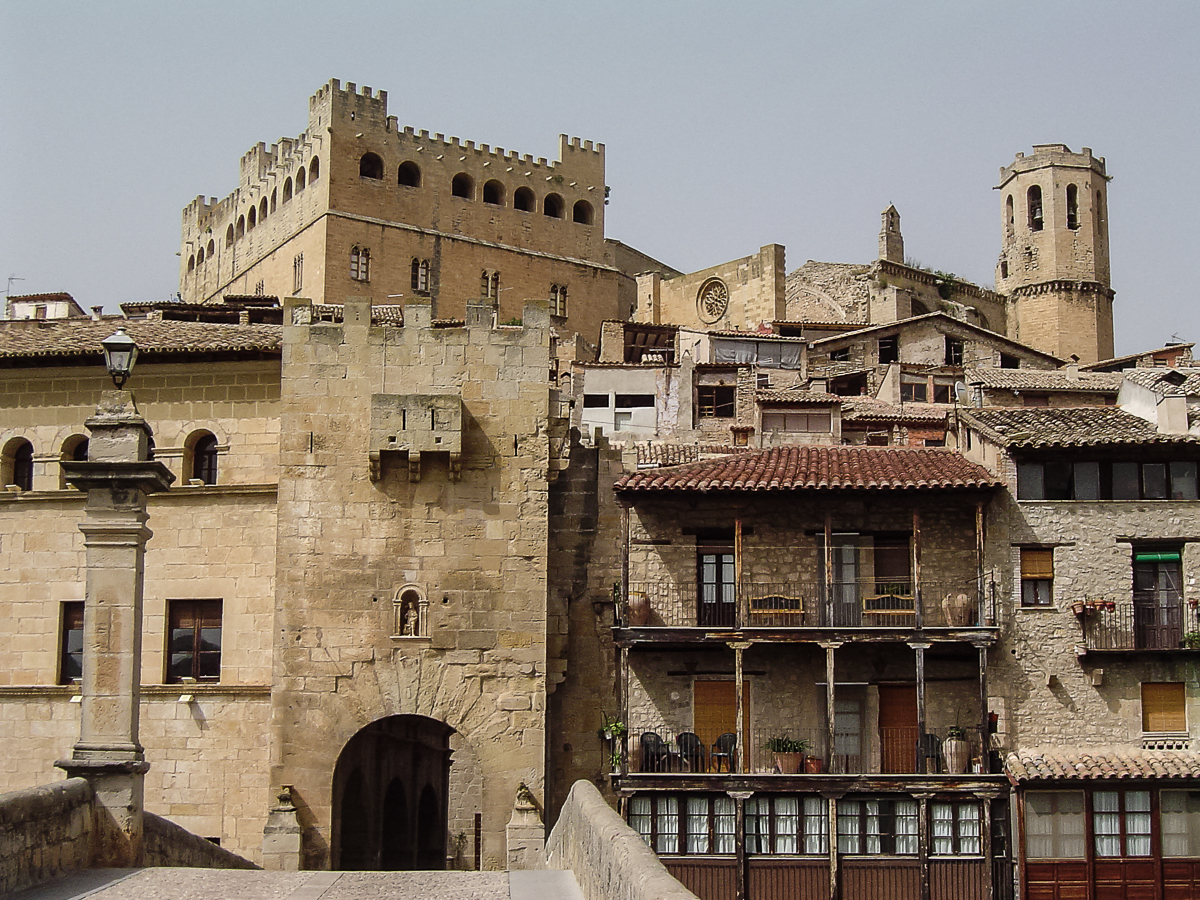
Valderrobres

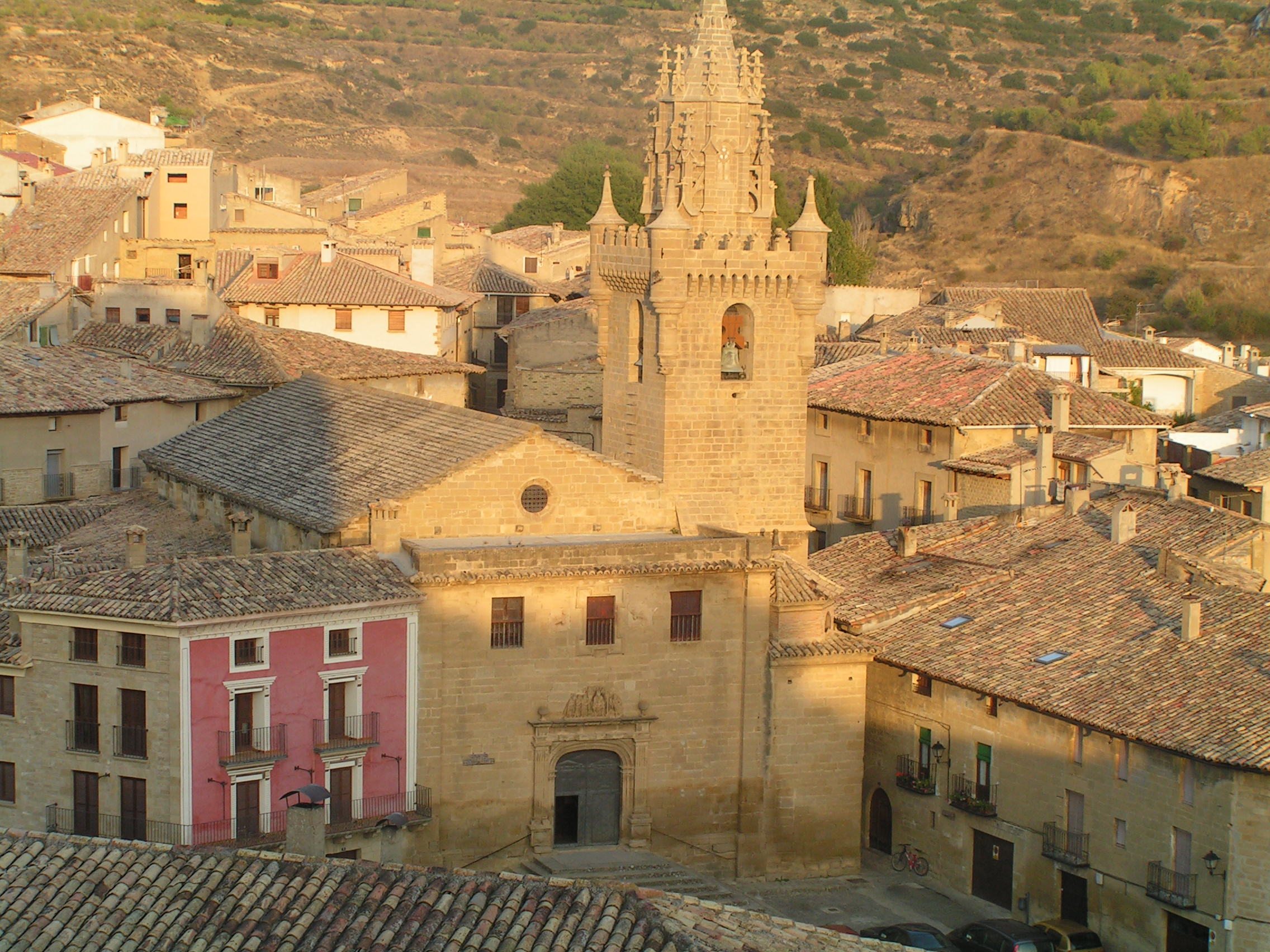
Church of Santa María in Uncastillo

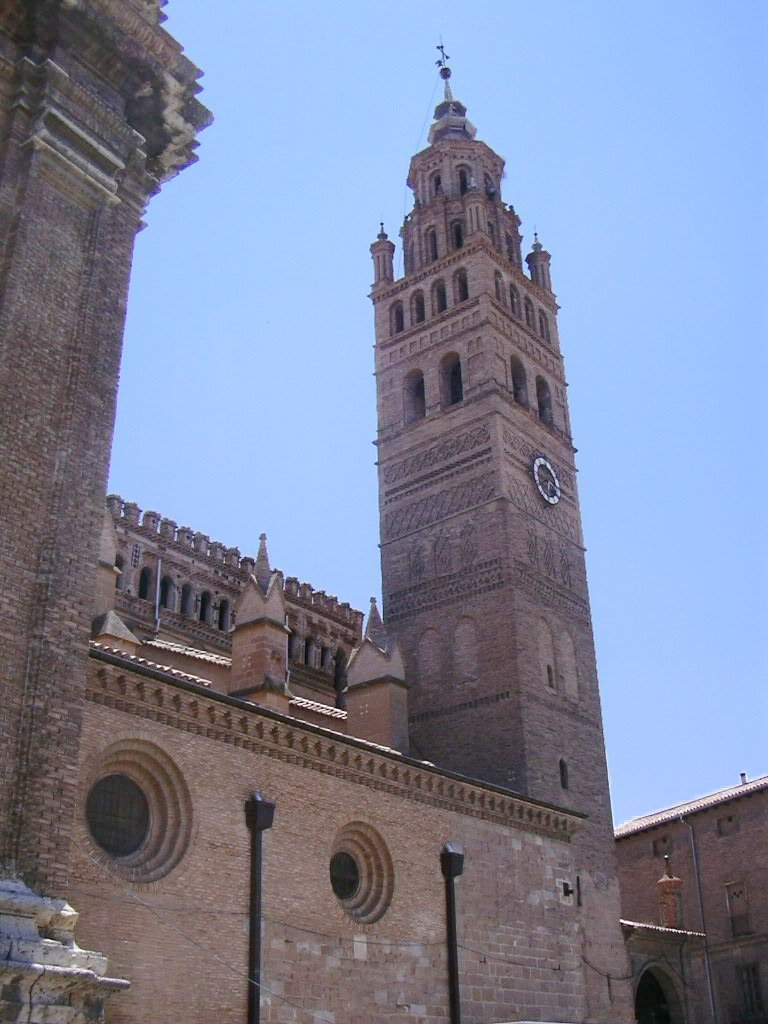
Tarazona

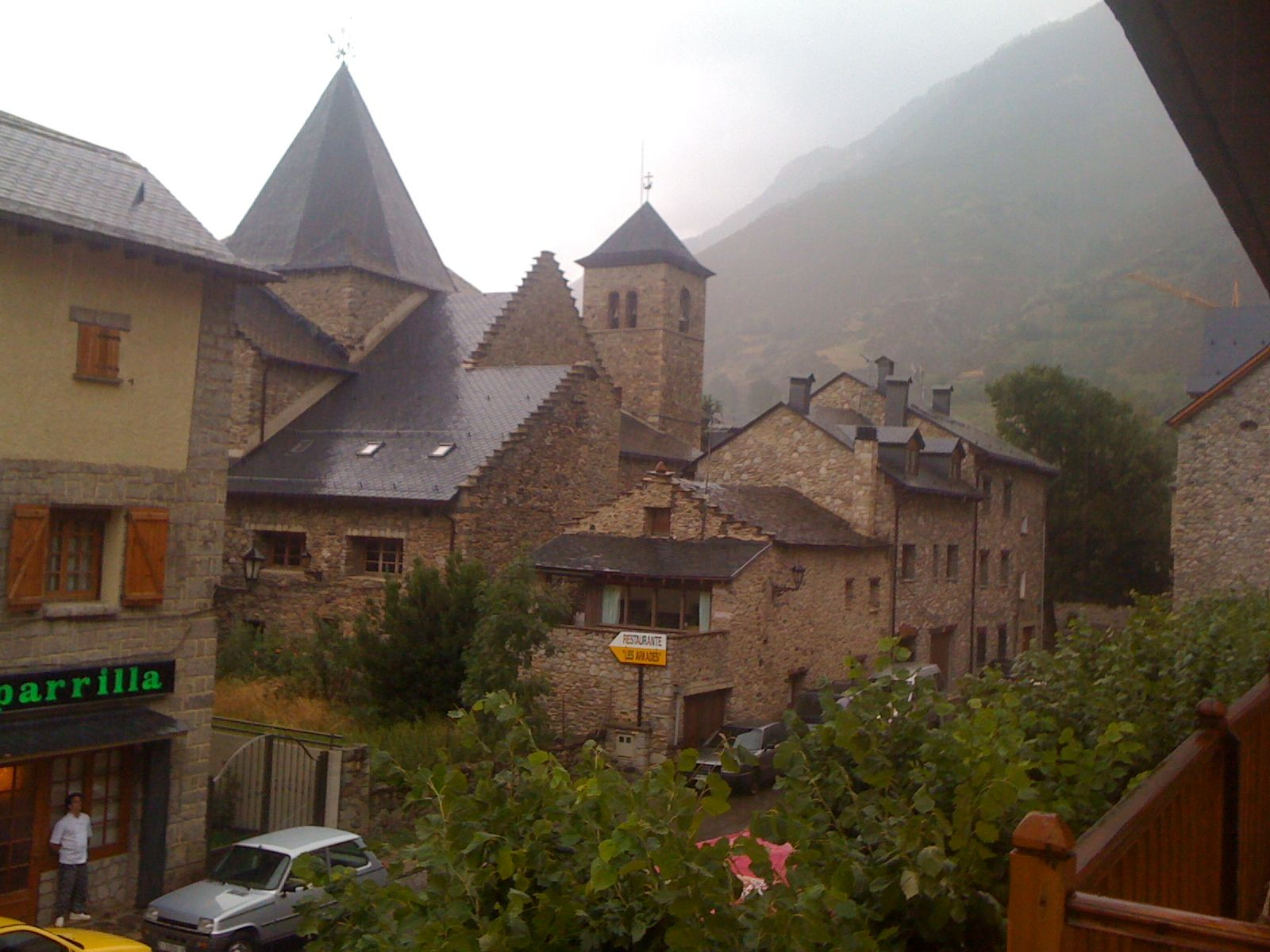
Benasque

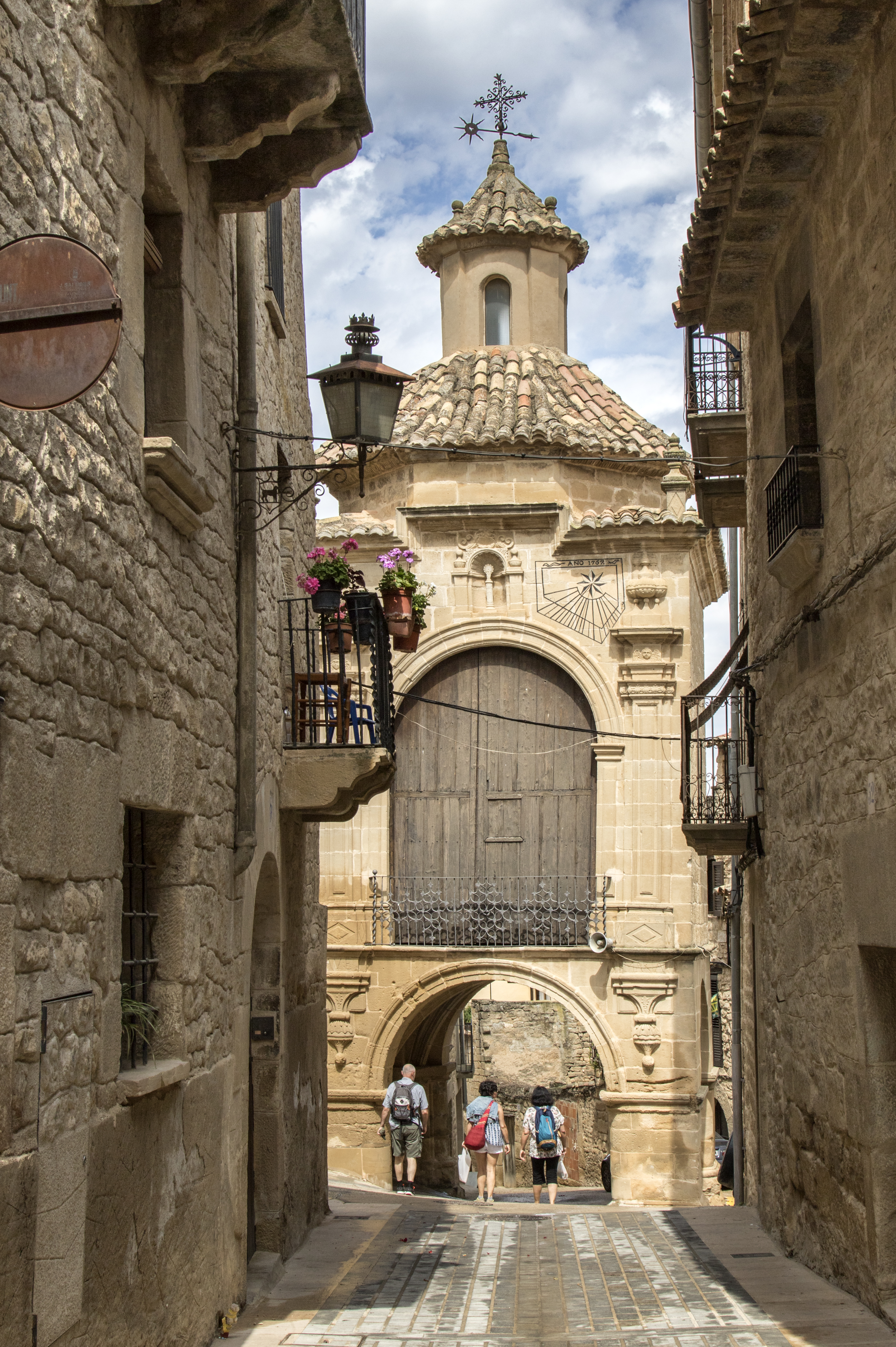
Calaceite

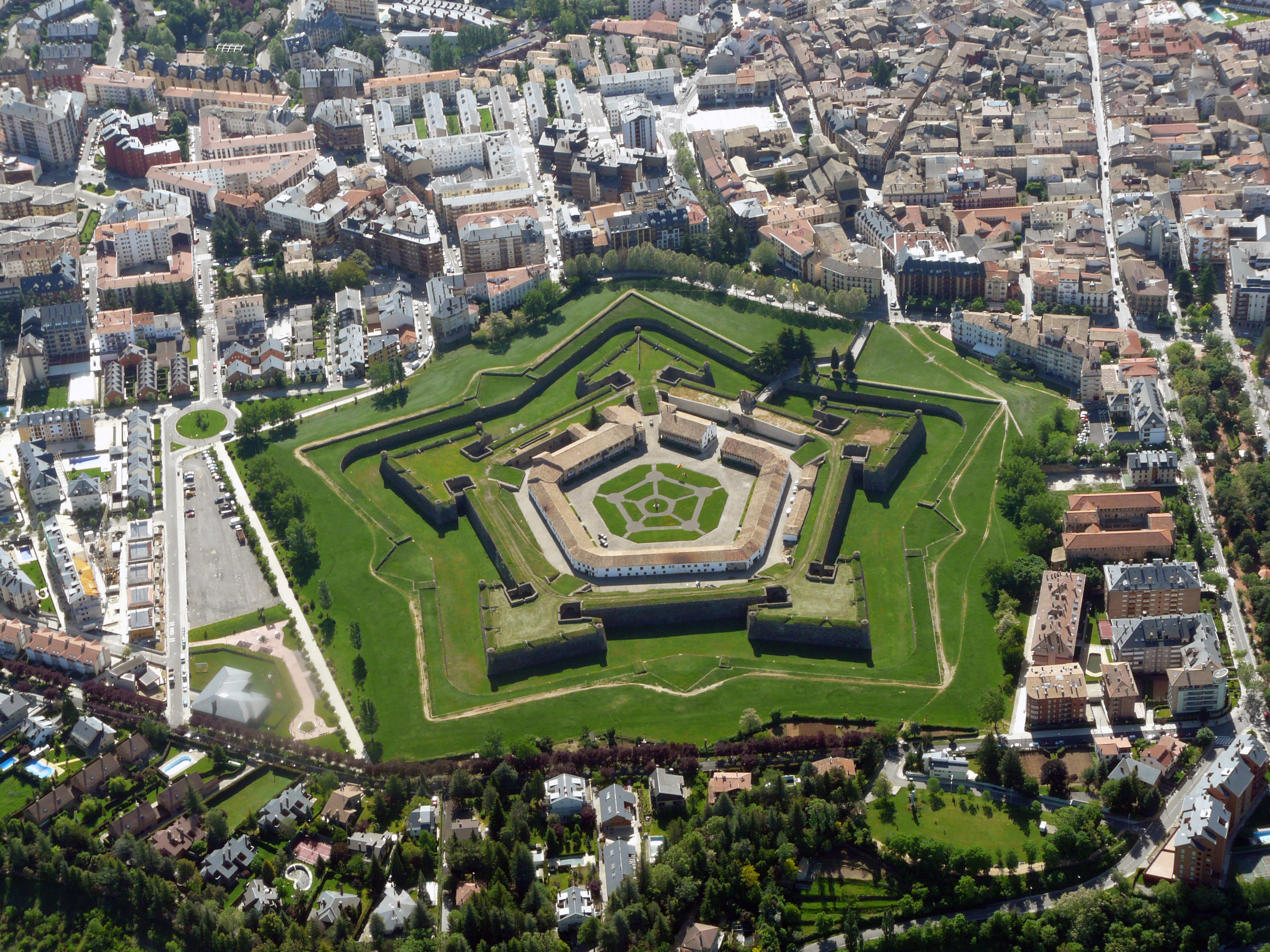
Citadel of Jaca in Jaca

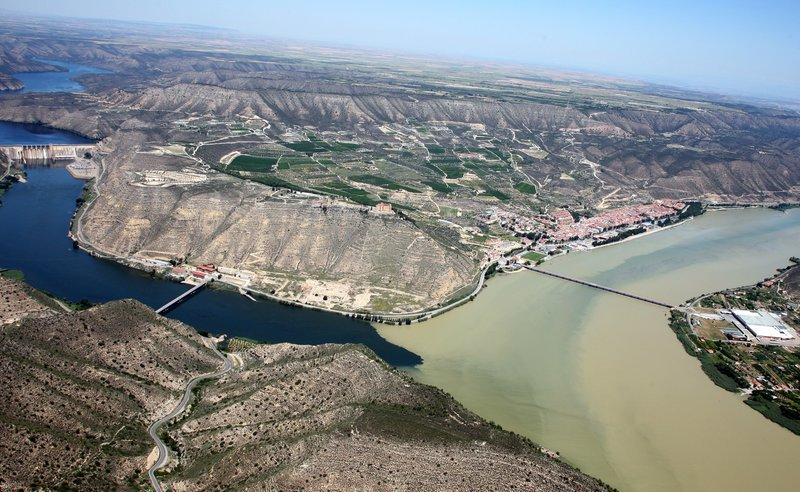
Aerial view of Mequinenza

== See also ==
- Aragonese Wikipedia
- Auberge d'Aragon
- Charterhouse of Las Fuentes
- Excrex
- Fiestas del Pilar
- Imperial Canal of Aragon
- List of Aragonese people
- List of municipalities in Aragon
- List of mountains in Aragon
- La Vaquilla del Ángel (in Spanish)

== Bibliography ==
- Argensola, Lupercio; The events in Aragon, 1590 and 1591.
- Argensola, Lupercio; Popular alterations of Zaragoza, 1591.
- Costa, Juan; Annals.
- De Aoiz, Lorenzo Ibáñez; Ceremonial and brief relation of all the charges and ordinary things of the Deputation of the Kingdom of Aragon. Published 1611.
- De Herrera y Tordesillas, Antonio; History of the things that happened in this Kingdom.
- De Lanuza, Vicencio Blasco; Secular and Ecclesiastical histories of Aragon. Volume 1 published 1616, Volume 2 1619.
- Lavanha, João Baptista; Cartography of the Kingdom of Aragon. Published 1611.
- Zurita y Castro, Jerónimo; Anales de la Corona de Aragón. Multi-volume history published between 1562 and 1580.
