= European Space Agency Science Programme =

Science programme

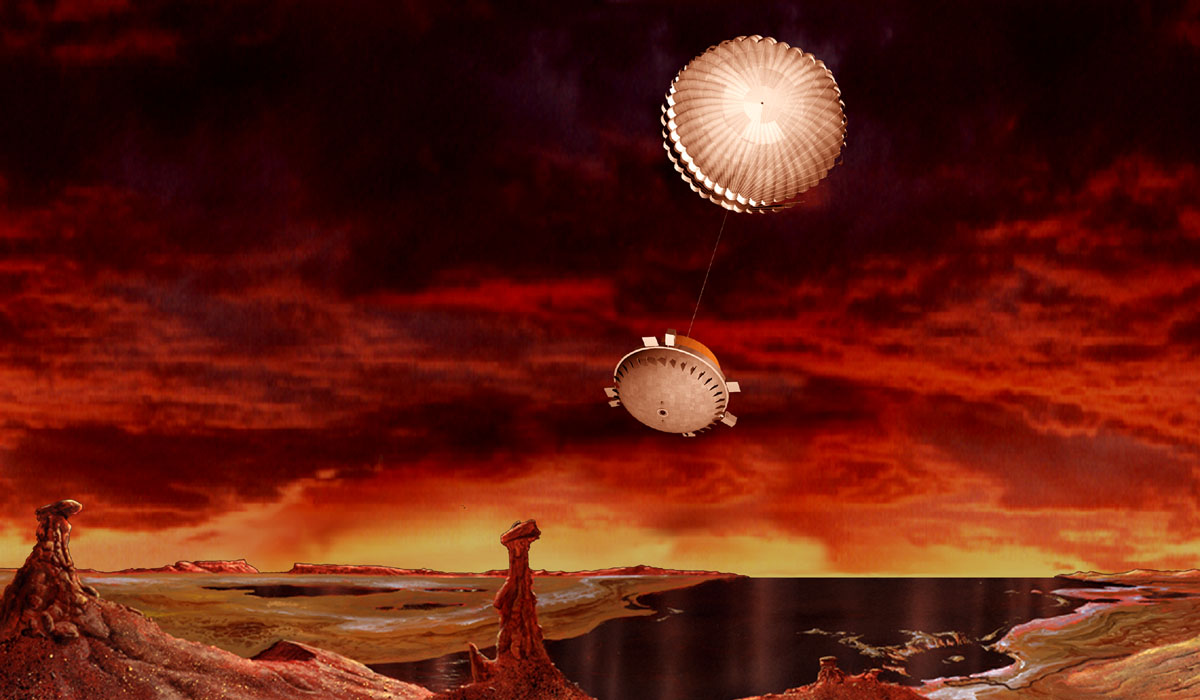
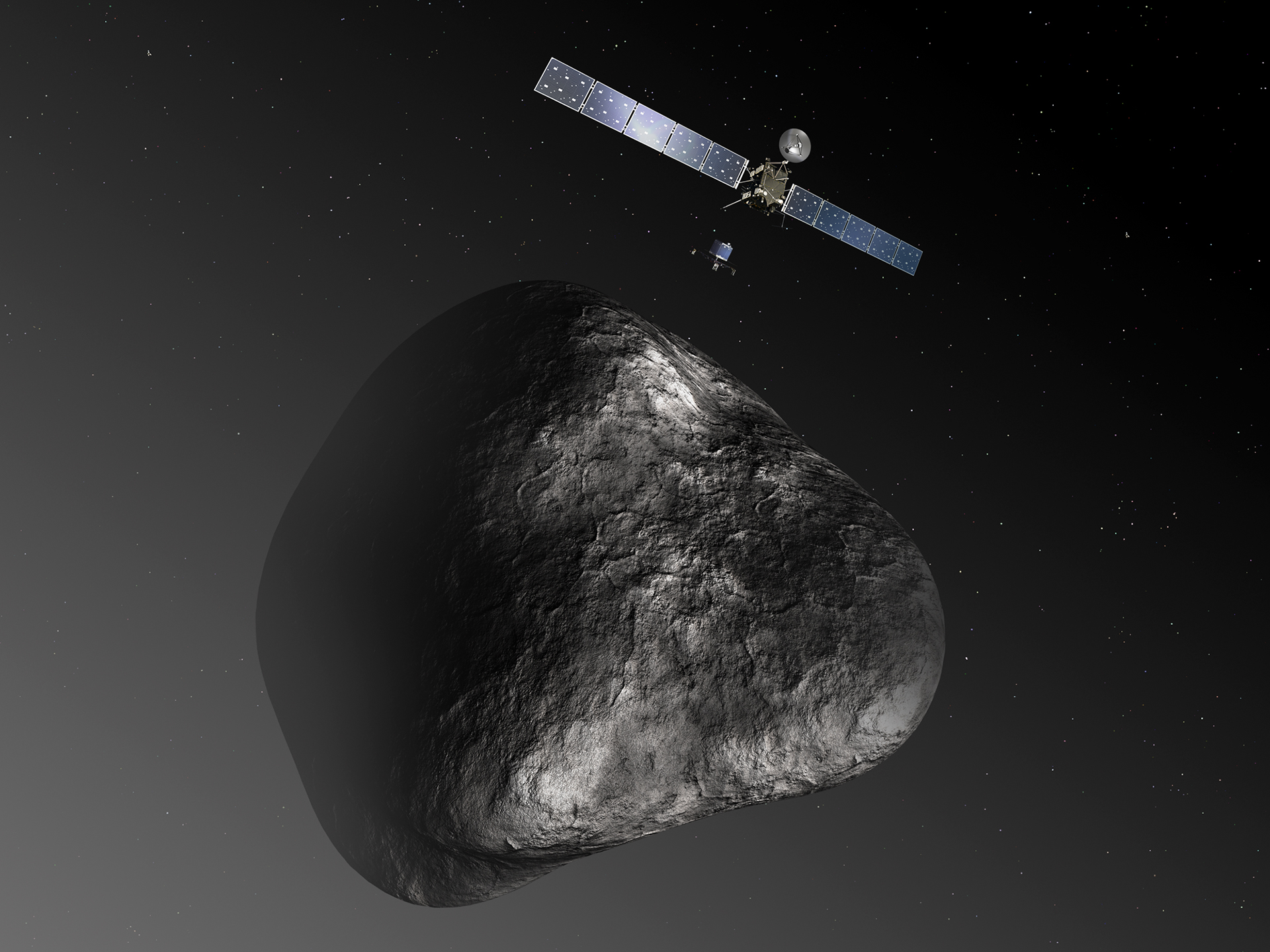
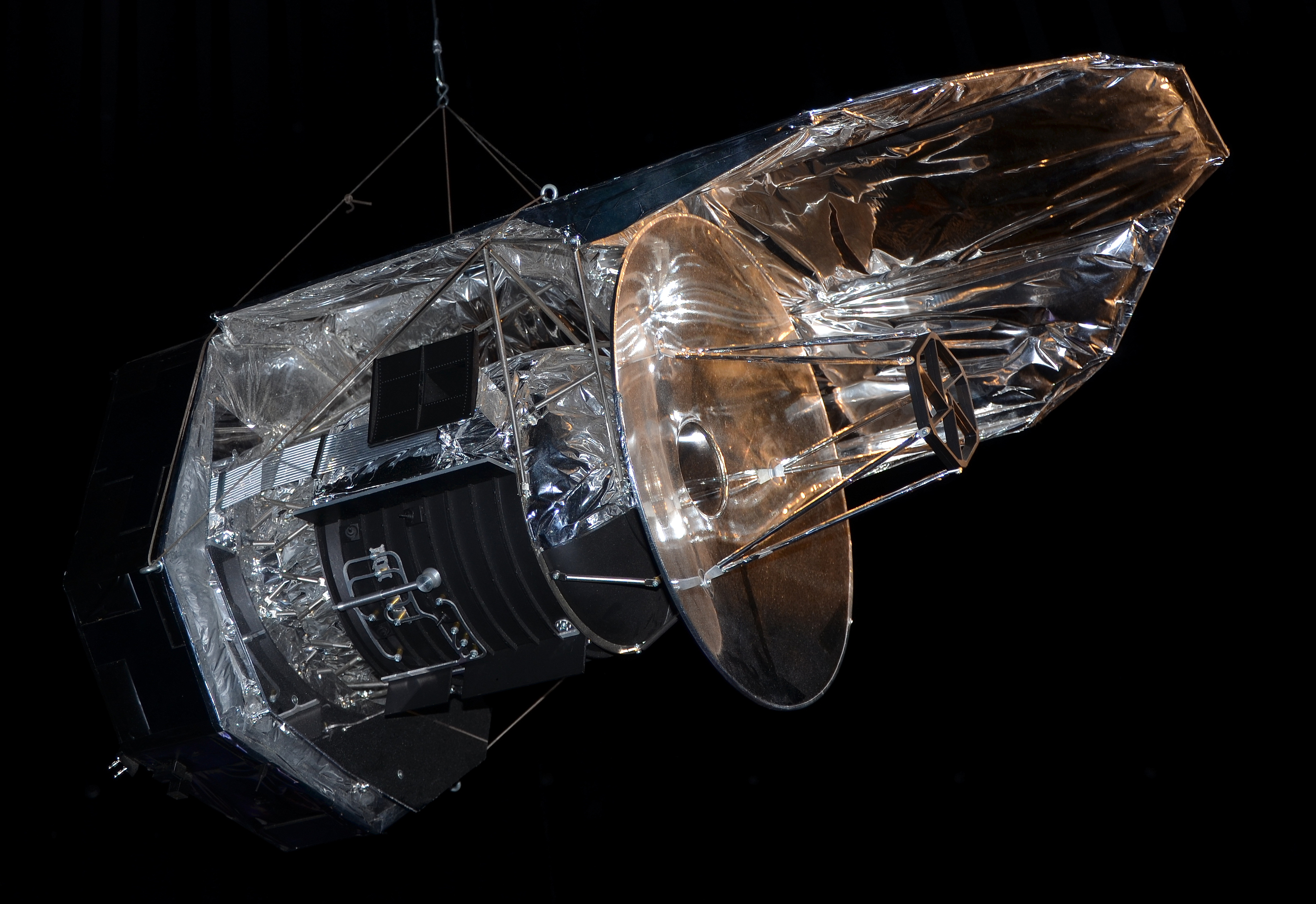
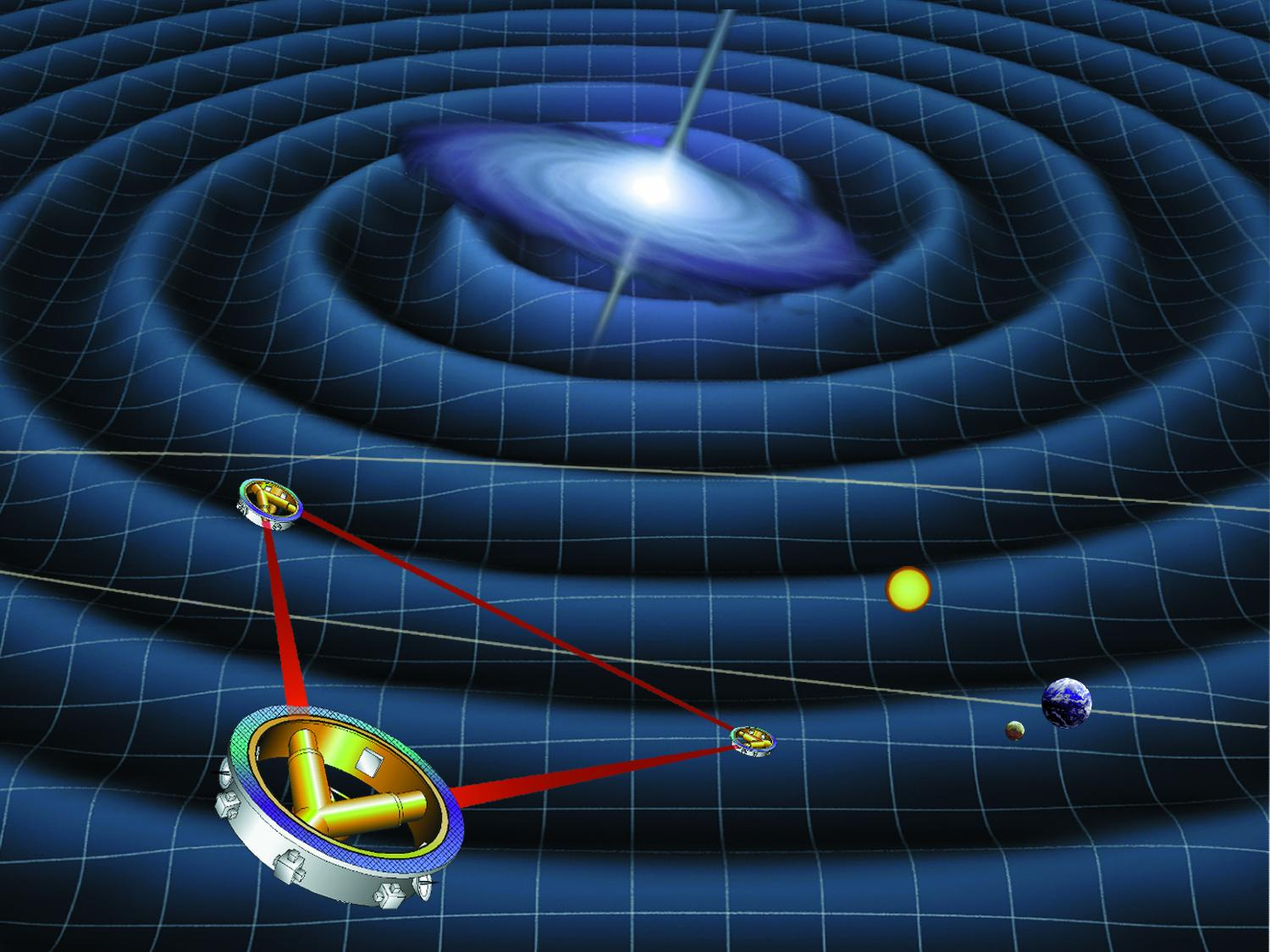
A selection of missions from the ESA Science Programme, from top to bottom ; the Huygens lander, the Rosetta orbiter, Herschel telescope and the LISA observatory

The Science Programme (Note: Also known as the ESA Science Programme, ESA's Science Programme, or the ESA scientific programme.) of the European Space Agency is a long-term programme of space science and space exploration missions. Managed by the agency's Directorate of Science, The programme funds the development, launch, and operation of missions led by European space agencies and institutions through generational campaigns. Horizon 2000, the programme's first campaign, facilitated the development of eight missions between 1985 and 1995 including four "cornerstone missions" – SOHO and Cluster II, XMM-Newton, Rosetta, and Herschel. Horizon 2000 Plus, the programme's second campaign, facilitated the development of Gaia, LISA Pathfinder, and BepiColombo between 1995 and 2005. The programme's current campaign since 2005, Cosmic Vision, has so far funded the development of ten missions including three flagship missions, JUICE, Athena, and LISA. The programme's upcoming fourth campaign, Voyage 2050, is currently being drafted. Collaboration with agencies and institutions outside of Europe occasionally occur in the Science Programme, including a collaboration with NASA on Cassini–Huygens and the CNSA on SMILE.

== Governance ==
ESA Science Programme advisory structure

Director of Science	Science Programme; Committee (SPC)
Space Science; Advisory Committee (SSAC)	Independent advisors
Astronomy; Working Group (AWG)	Solar System and Exploration; Working Group (SSEWG)	Ad hoc working groups

The Science Programme is managed by the European Space Agency (ESA)'s Directorate of Science, and its goals include the proliferation of Europe's scientific presence in space, fostering technological innovation, and maintaining European space infrastructure such as launch services and spacecraft operations. It is one of ESA's mandatory programmes in which each member state of ESA must participate. Members contribute an amount proportional to their net national product to ensure the long-term financial security of the programme and its missions. The programme's planning structure is a "bottom up" process that allows the European scientific community to control the direction of the programme through advisory bodies. These bodies make recommendations on the programme to the Director General and the Director of Science, and their recommendations are independently reported to ESA's Science Programme Committee (SPC) – the authority over the programme as a whole. The programme's current advisory structure consists the Astronomy Working Group (AWG) and the Solar System and Exploration Working Group (SSEWG), who report to the senior Space Science Advisory Committee (SSAC) that reports to the agency's directors. Membership on the advisory bodies last three years, and the chairs of the AWG and SSEWG are also members of the SSAC. Ad hoc advisory groups may also be created to advise on certain mission proposals or the formulation of planning cycles.

Missions in the programme are selected through competitions in which members of the European scientific community submit proposals to ESA. During each competition, the agency outlines one of four mission categories for which proposals need to meet the criteria of. These are the "L"-class large missions, the "M"-class medium missions, the "S"-class small missions, and the "F"-class fast missions, each with differing budget caps and implementation timelines. The proposals are then reviewed by the AWG, SSEWG, engineers at ESA, and any relevant ad hoc working groups, as part of a feasibility study known as "Phase 0". Missions which require new technologies to be developed are reviewed during these studies at the Concurrent Design Facility at the European Space Research and Technology Centre. After the study, up to three proposals are selected as finalists in "Phase A", in which a preliminary design for each candidate mission is formulated. The SPC then makes a final decision on which proposal proceeds to phases "B" through "F", which include the development, construction, launch, and disposal of the spacecraft used in the mission. During Phase A, each candidate mission is assigned two competing contractors to build their spacecraft, and the contractor for the winning mission is chosen during Phase B.

== History ==
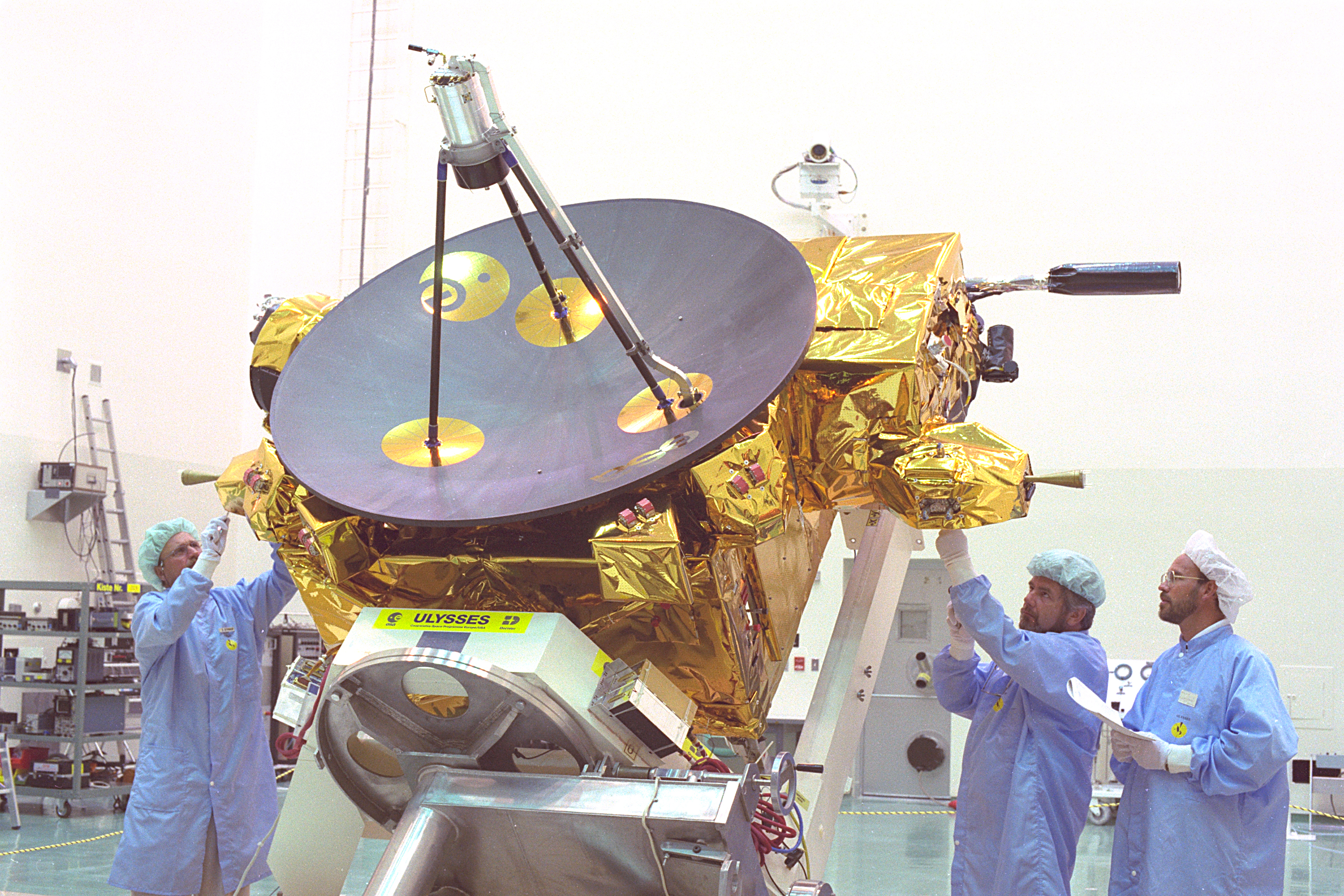
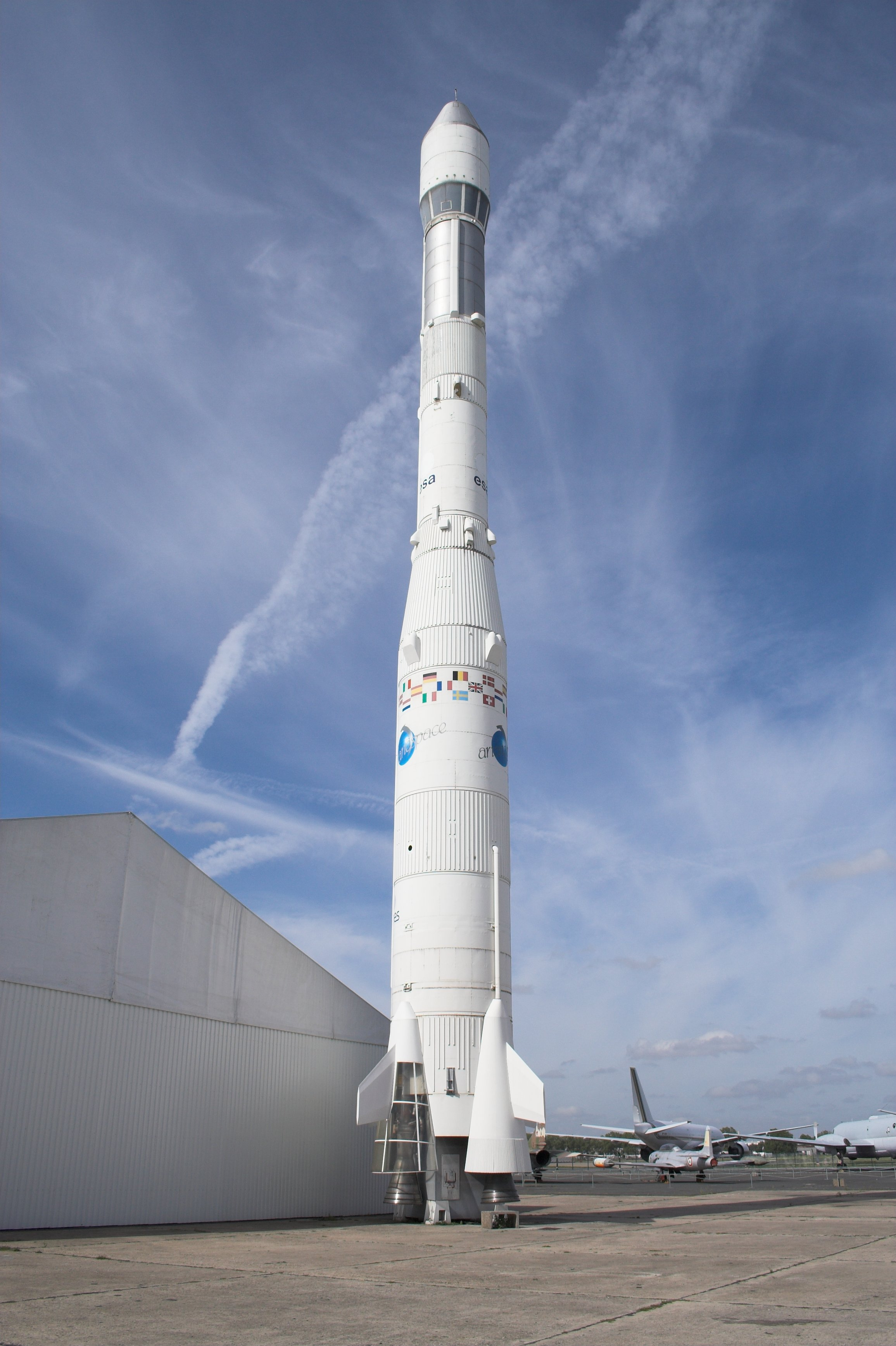
Setbacks on the joint US-European Ulysses mission and the successes of the European rocket Ariane 1 were catalysts for an autonomous European programme of space science

=== Background ===
The European Space Agency (ESA) was established in May 1975 as the merger of the European Space Research Organisation (ESRO) and the European Launcher Development Organisation. In 1970, the governing Launch Programme Advisory Committee (LPAC) of ESRO made a decision not to execute astronomy or planetary missions, which were perceived as beyond the budget and capabilities of the organisation at the time. This meant that cooperation with other government space agencies and institutions was necessary for large-scale scientific missions. This policy was effectively reversed in 1980, when ESA's then-Director of Science, Ernst Trendelenburg, and the agency's new authoritative Science Programme Committee (SPC) selected the Giotto flyby reconnaissance mission to comet Halley and the Hipparcos astrometry mission for launch. In addition to the selection of the International Ultraviolet Explorer observatory in March 1983, the three were the first European science missions launched aboard Arianespace launch vehicles, which gave Europe autonomy over its launch services.

This, in addition to the lack of a long-term plan for scientific missions, along with budget setbacks from NASA on the collaborative International Solar Polar Mission (later named Ulysses), spurred the development of a long-term scientific programme through which ESA could sustainably plan missions independent of other agencies and institutions over lengthier periods. The leadership and advisory structure of ESA's Directorate of Science changed immediately prior to the programme's establishment. In the 1970s, ESA's Science Advisory Committee (SAC), which succeeded the LPAC, advised the Director General on all scientific matters; the Astronomy Working Group (AWG) and the Solar System Working Group (SSWG) also reported directly to the Director General. In the early 1980s, the SAC was replaced with the Space Science Advisory Committee (SSAC), who were tasked to report to the Director of Science on developments in the AWG and SSWG. In addition, former SAC chair Roger-Maurice Bonnet replaced Trendelenburg as Director of Science in May 1983.

=== Horizon 2000 ===
==== Formulation ====
In November and December 1983, ESA made the first open call for mission proposals to the European scientific community, based on an idea for a community-driven programme presented by Bonnet to the SPC in late 1983. The call yielded 68 proposals – 30 in the field of astronomy and 34 in the field of solar physics, with 4 miscellaneous concepts also submitted. An ad hoc "survey committee" led by then-SRON Director Johan Bleeker was convened, consisting members of the SSAC, CERN, the European Science Foundation, the European Southern Observatory, and the International Astronomical Union, to examine the proposals submitted. Throughout early 1984, the survey committee formulated plans for a series of missions divided into three categories – "cornerstones" which would cost two annual budgets over a long implementation timeline, medium-size missions which would cost one annual budget, and small-size missions that would cost half an annual budget.

"Over the past 25 years, space science has progressed from the pioneering and exploratory stage to a firmly established mature branch of fundamental science. The time has come to identify what the main thrusts of European space science should be for the coming decades to consolidate Europe's position in the forefront of scientific development."

— Horizon 2000 survey committee, 1984

The budget for the Science Programme was 130 million accounting units (MAU) annually in 1984, and a 7% annual increase until 1991, when the budget would be fixed at 200 MAU per year onwards, was proposed. Medium-size and small-size categories would later be merged into a single medium-size category that would represent missions costing half a budget. This category was internally referred to as the "blue missions", named after their representation as blue boxes in a publicised diagram of the plan. Each of the original three cornerstones of the plan were assigned a specific field of science that competing proposals would aim to fill, while the objectives of medium-sized missions were left open to be competitively selected alongside mission proposals. The cornerstones selected were a comet sample-return mission, an X-ray spectroscopy mission, and a submillimetre astronomy mission. Cornerstone objectives that were not selected due to financial and technical shortcomings, but mentioned by the survey committee as possibilities beyond Horizon 2000, included a solar probe, a Mars rover, and a two-dimensional interferometry mission.

The survey committee's final meeting was held on San Giorgio Maggiore, Venice in June 1984, where the "Horizon 2000" plan was presented to ESA's then-Director General Erik Quistgaard, and leading members of the European scientific community. The broad objectives of Horizon 2000 were to expand scientific knowledge, establish Europe as a developmental centre of space science, provide opportunities to the European scientific community, and spur innovation in the space technology industry. At the meeting, an additional fourth cornerstone presented by the SSWG was adopted – the Solar-Terrestrial Science Programme (STSP) consisting the Solar and Heliospheric Observatory and Cluster proposals, which became the first missions to be selected for launch under Horizon 2000. Quistgaard presented the Horizon 2000 plan at the 1985 Ministerial Council in Rome, where it was approved with only a 5% annual increase of the budget through to 1989, instead of the requested 7% through to 1991. This was only enough to fund around half of Horizon 2000's objectives. However, an extension of the 5% annual increase through to 1994 was approved at the 1990 Ministerial Council in The Hague, which allowed all Horizon 2000 missions to be fully funded.

==== Implementation ====
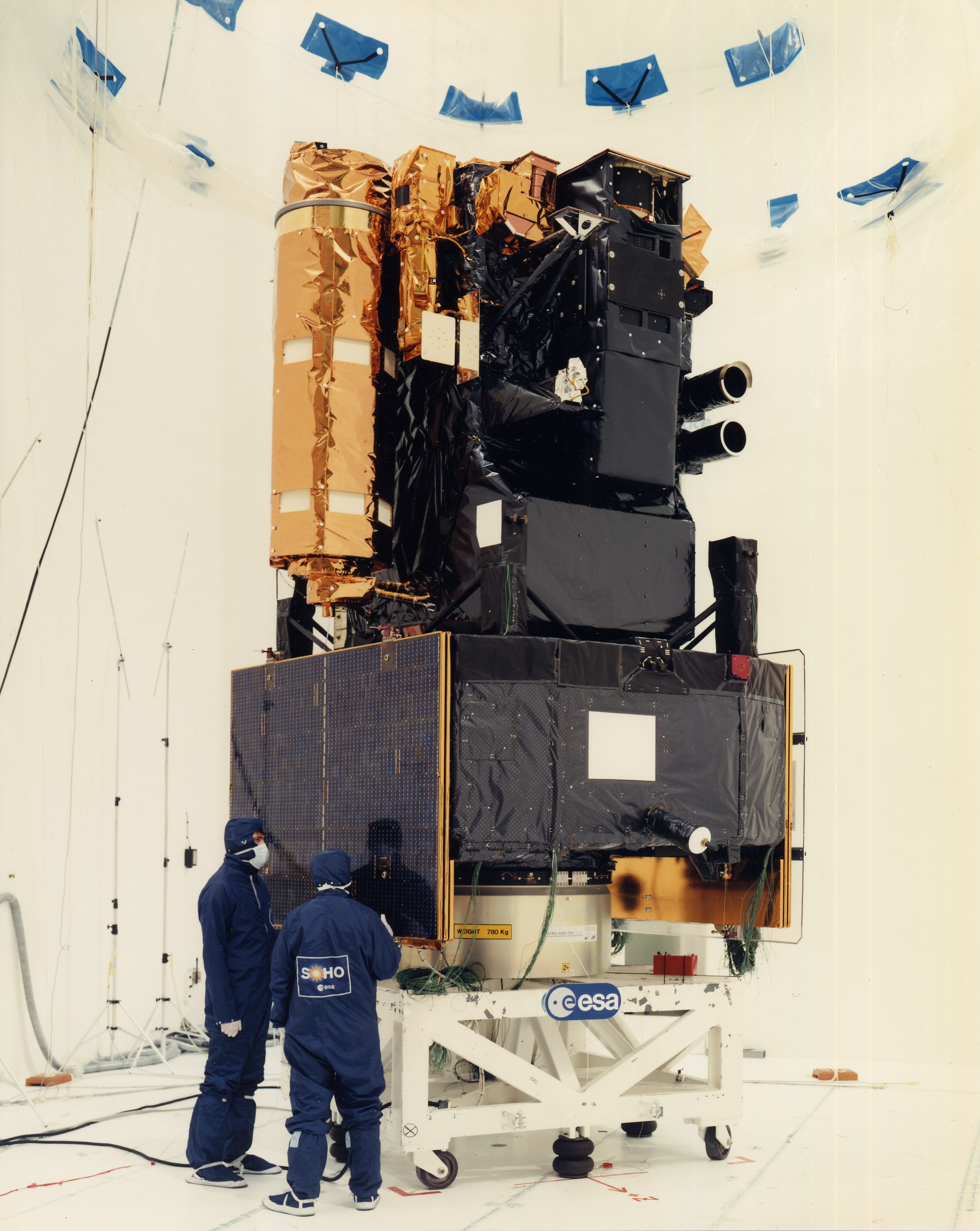
The selection of SOHO (pictured) and Cluster was challenged early in development due to financial concerns

The X-ray Multi-Mirror Mission (XMM) was conceived as the X-ray spectroscopy cornerstone mission at an ESA workshop in Lyngby in June 1985, consisting a space observatory with twelve low-energy and seven high-energy telescopes. Due to practical constraints, the mission's payload was reduced to seven telescopes overall by 1987, though the success of EXOSAT inspired mission planners to improve the efficiency of the mission's observations by placing the spacecraft in a highly eccentric orbit, allowing the payload of the spacecraft to be reduced to its final design of three large telescopes – each with a reflecting area of 1,500 cm^{2}. By 1986, the cost of the STSP cornerstone was forecast to exceed its allocated 400 MAU budget, and in a February 1986 meeting, the SPC was presented with the possibility of cancelling the cornerstone in favour of a medium-size mission selection between SOHO, Cluster, and the Kepler Mars orbiter proposal, which had gained popularity among members of the SSAC.

The Space Shuttle Challenger disaster, which occurred the month before, had an effect on proceedings, as SOHO was intended to be launched via the Shuttle. Despite this, the SSWG, SSAC, and SPC reaffirmed a commitment to the STSP cornerstone by descoping SOHO and limiting Cluster to three spacecraft, and reaching a collaboration agreement with NASA in October 1986 that would reduce the mission's cost – they would provide testing, launch services, and operations of SOHO and contribute various scientific instruments, while cancelling their Equator mission in favour of a fourth Cluster spacecraft on which American scientific instruments would be flown. (Note: Equator was a planned mission by NASA to explore Earth's magnetosphere from an equatorial orbit. It was NASA's contribution to a joint mission with the STSP known as the International Solar-Terrestrial Physics (ISTP) programme.)

The first medium-class mission was selected from proposals formulated by ESA in 1982, prior to Horizon 2000. A Titan Probe that would piggyback on the American Cassini spacecraft was proposed by a group of American and European scientists, and was selected alongside the American-European LYMAN ultraviolet and QUASAT very-long-baseline interferometry observatories as finalists. The European-Soviet Vesta multiple-flyby minor planet mission and GRASP gamma-ray observatory competed, but were rejected by the AWG and SSWG. After budget cuts resulting from the Challenger disaster forced NASA to retract its support for LYMAN and QUASAT, the Titan Probe was selected by the SPC in November 1988, and renamed Huygens in honor of Christiaan Huygens, who discovered Titan in 1655, per the suggestion of Swiss astronomers at the meeting. In the competition for the second medium-class mission in June 1989, a consortium of American and European institutions proposed INTEGRAL, a gamma-ray observatory that combined GRASP with the American Nuclear Astrophysics Explorer (NAE), which had lost selection for NASA's Explorers Programme that year. NASA supported the proposal, and the Russian Academy of Sciences later offered launch aboard a Proton launch vehicle in exchange for observation time on the mission. Despite concerns about NASA's commitment to the mission and their funding sources, INTEGRAL was selected by the SPC in June 1993, with NASA contributing Deep Space Network services and a spectrometer. In response, INTEGRAL was selected by NASA as an Explorers mission without competition. This, along with concerns about the sensitivity of the spectrometer designed for the mission, proved controversial among NASA's advisory bodies. In September 1994, ESA and NASA resolved to end NASA's involvement with the spectrometer, citing a lack of financial support. CNES promptly assumed the financial burden, and led the design and manufacturing of a new spectrometer.

Rosetta and FIRST were selected in November 1993 as the third and fourth cornerstone missions, with the latter mission eventually being rechristened the Herschel Space Observatory. COBRAS/SAMBA, later rechristened Planck, was selected as the third medium-sized mission in July 1996. As of December 2016, four Horizon 2000 missions, including three cornerstone and one medium-sized mission, remain operational.

=== Horizon 2000 Plus ===
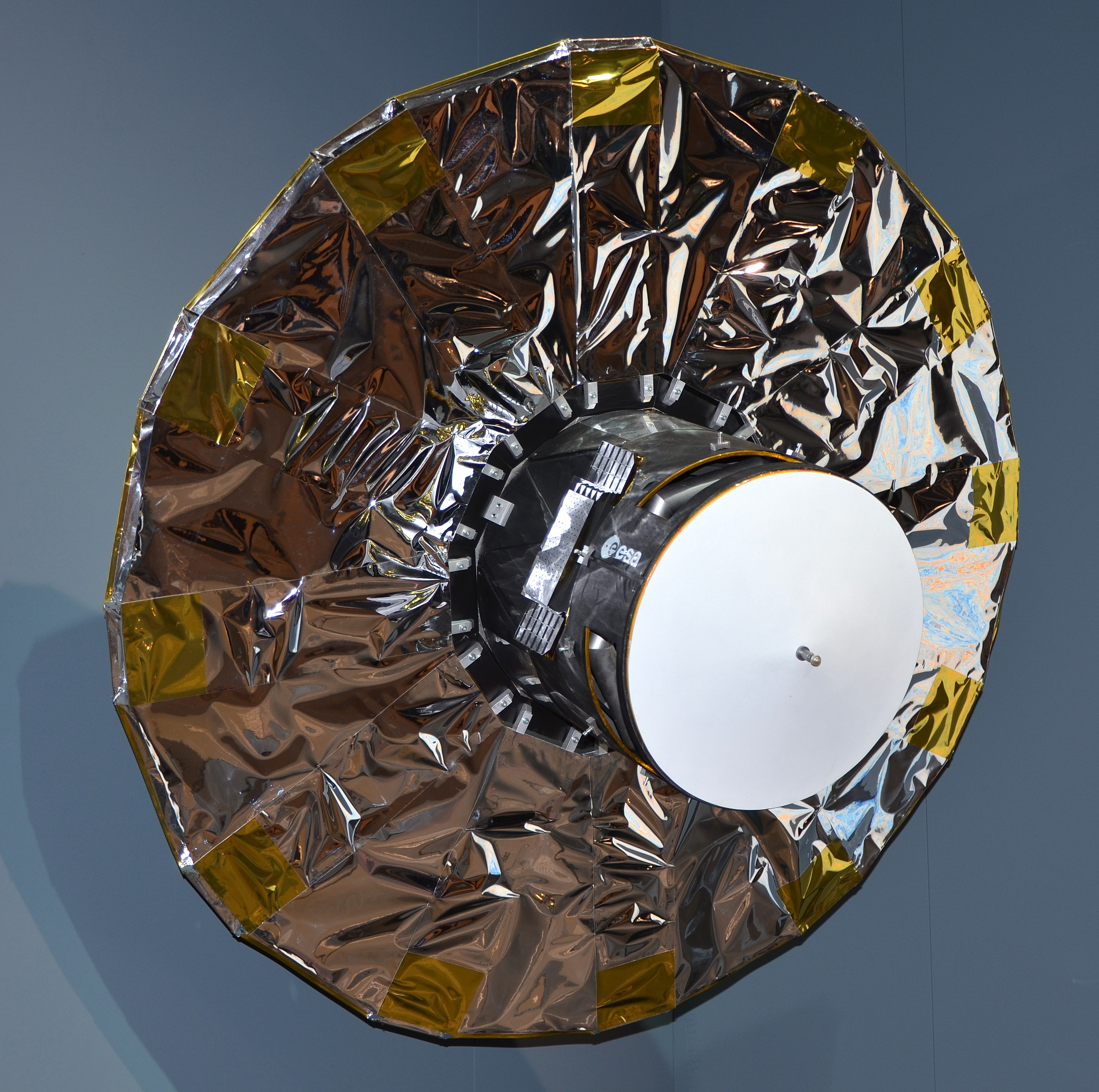
The Gaia astrometry mission was launched as one of three missions in the Horizon 2000 Plus campaign.

Horizon 2000 Plus was an extension of Horizon 2000 programme prepared in the mid-1990s, planning missions in the 1995–2015 timeframe. This included two further cornerstone missions, the star-mapping GAIA launched in 2013, and the BepiColombo mission to Mercury launched in 2018; and also a technology demonstrator LISA Pathfinder launched in 2015, to test technologies for the future LISA. All of the Horizon 2000 and Plus missions were successful, except for the first Cluster which was destroyed in 1996 when its launch rocket exploded. A replacement, Cluster 2, was built and launched successfully in 2000.

=== Cosmic Vision ===
Cosmic Vision 2015–2025 is the current programme of ESA's long-term planning for space science missions. The initial call of ideas and concepts was launched in 2004 with a subsequent workshop held in Paris to define more fully the themes of the Cosmic Vision under the broader subjects of astronomy and astrophysics, Solar System exploration and fundamental physics. By early 2006 the formulation for a 10-year plan based around 4 key questions emerged:

- What are the conditions for planet formation and the emergence of life?
- How does the Solar System work?
- What are the fundamental physical laws of the Universe?
- How did the Universe originate and what is it made of?

In March 2007 a call for mission ideas was formally released, which yielded 19 astrophysics, 12 fundamental physics and 19 Solar System mission proposals.

==== Large class ====
Large class (L-class) missions were originally intended to be carried out in collaboration with other partners with an ESA-specific cost not exceeding 900 million euros. However, in April 2011 it became clear that budget pressures in the US meant that an expected collaboration with NASA on the L1 mission would not be practical. The down-selection was therefore delayed and the missions re-scoped on the assumption of ESA leadership with some limited international participation. Three L-class missions have been selected under Cosmic Vision: JUICE, a Jupiter and Ganymede orbiter launched in April 2023; Athena, an X-ray observatory planned for launch in 2035; and LISA, a space-based gravitational-wave observatory planned for launch in 2035. In April 2024, ESA identified a mission to the Saturn system, including a tour of several Saturn moons, as the science case for the next large scale mission (L4) and the first from ESA's "Voyage 2050" vision.

==== Medium class ====
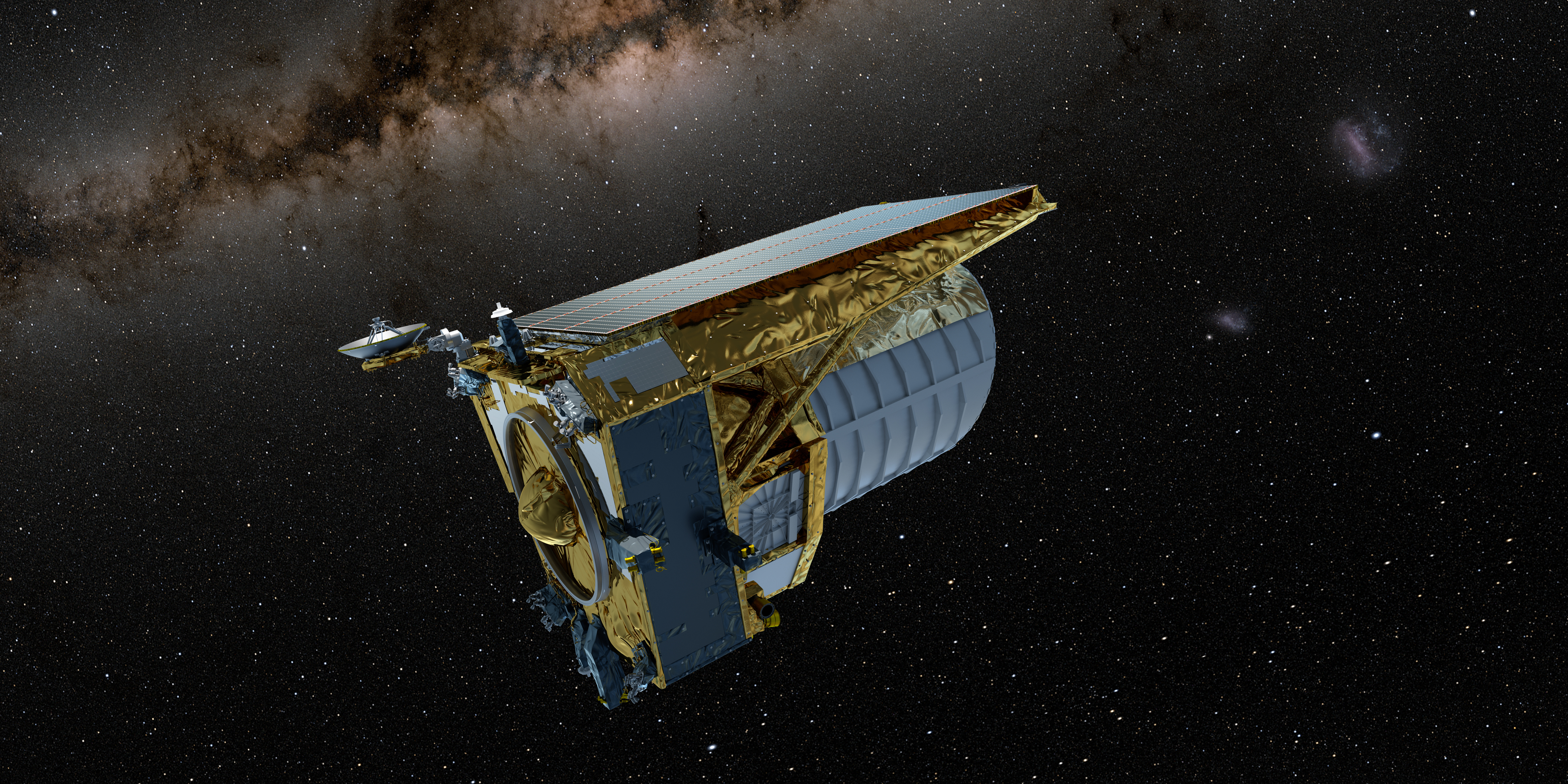
The Euclid near-infrared observatory, launched as the second Cosmic Vision M-class mission.

Medium class (M-class) projects are relatively stand-alone projects and have a price cap of approximately 500 million euros. The first two M-class missions, the Solar Orbiter heliophysics mission to make close-up observations of the Sun, and the Euclid visible to near-infrared space telescope, aimed at studying dark energy and dark matter, were selected in October 2011. PLATO, a mission to search for exoplanets and measure stellar oscillations, was selected on 19 February 2014, against EChO, LOFT, MarcoPolo-R and STE-QUEST After a preliminary culling of proposals for the fourth M-class mission in March 2015, a short list of three mission proposals selected for further study was announced on 4 June 2015. The shortlist included the THOR plasma observatory and the XIPE X-ray observatory. ARIEL, a space observatory which will observe transits of nearby exoplanets to determine their chemical composition and physical conditions, was ultimately selected on 20 March 2018. The competition for the fifth M-class mission concluded in June 2021, with the EnVision Venus orbiter ultimately being selected for launch in 2031. The SPICA far-infrared observatory and THESEUS gamma-ray observatory were the other two proposals.

==== Small class ====
Small class missions (S-class) are intended to have a cost to ESA not exceeding 50 million euros. A first call for mission proposals was issued in March 2012; the winning proposal would need to be ready for launch by 2017. Approximately 70 letters of Intent were received. CHEOPS, a mission to search for exoplanets by photometry, was selected as the first S-class mission in October 2012 and launched in December 2019. SMILE, a joint mission between ESA and the Chinese Academy of Sciences to study the interaction between Earth's magnetosphere and the solar wind, was selected as the second S-class mission from thirteen competing proposals in June 2015 and launched in May 2026.

==== Fast class ====
At the ESA Science Programme Committee (SPC) Workshop on 16 May 2018, the creation of a series of special opportunity Fast class (F-class) missions was proposed. These F-class missions will be jointly launched alongside each M-class mission starting from M4, and would focus on "innovative implementation" in order to broaden the range of scientific topics covered by the mission. The inclusion of F-class missions into the Cosmic Vision program will require an increase of the science budget. F-class missions must take under a decade from selection to launch and weigh less than 1,000 kg. The first F-class mission, Comet Interceptor, was selected in June 2019. On 2 November 2022, ESA announced the F-class mission ARRAKIHS, to be launched in the early 2030s.

==== Missions of Opportunity ====
Occasionally ESA makes contributions to space missions led by another space agency. Missions of opportunity allow the ESA science community to participate in partner-led missions at relatively low cost. The cost of a mission of opportunity is capped at €50 million. ESA missions of opportunity include contributions to Hinode, IRIS, MICROSCOPE, PROBA-3, XRISM, ExoMars, Einstein Probe, and MMX. A contribution to SPICA (Space Infrared Telescope for Cosmology and Astrophysics), a Japanese JAXA mission, was evaluated as a mission of opportunity within Cosmic Vision. It is no longer considered within that framework, though SPICA was one of the mission proposals being considered for M5.

=== Voyage 2050 ===
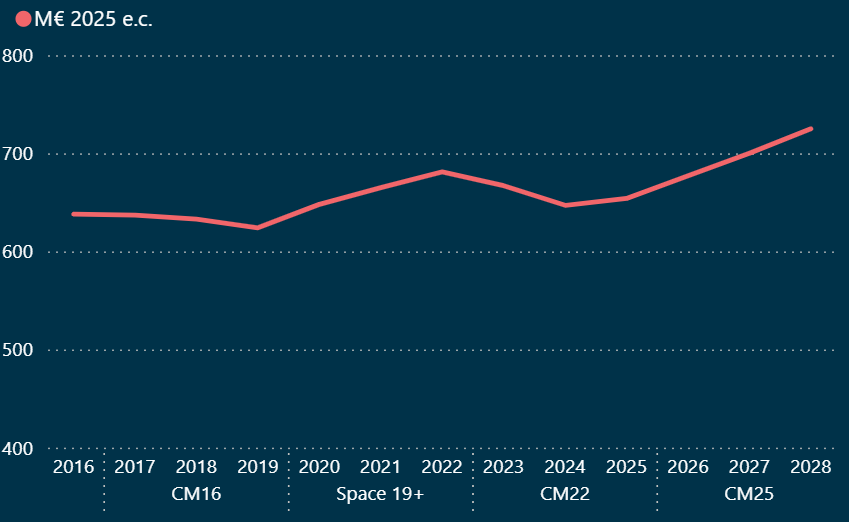
Budget increase for the Science Programme of 3.5% per year through to 2028, in addition to inflation, agreed at the ESA Ministerial Council in November 2025

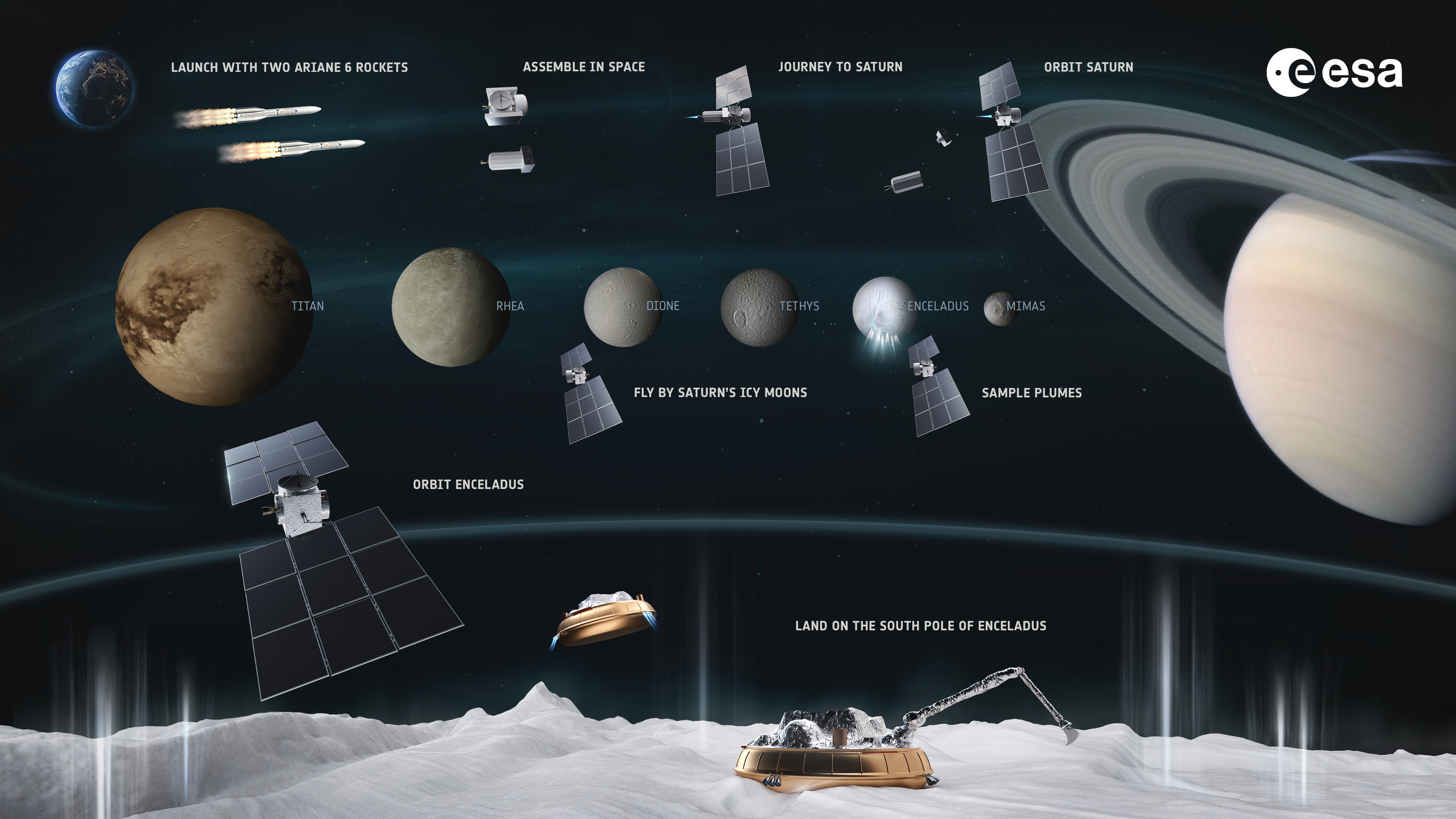
Enceladus mission concept by ESA (Voyage 2050 L4)

The next campaign of the ESA science programme is Voyage 2050, which will cover space science missions operating from 2035 to 2050. Planning began with the appointment of a Senior Committee in December 2018 and a call for white papers in March 2019. Three Large class and six to seven Medium class missions are currently anticipated in this plan, as well as smaller missions and missions of opportunity.

==== Large class (Voyage 2050) ====
On 11 June 2021, the Senior Committee published the Voyage 2050 plan, and recommended the following science themes for the next three Large class missions:

- Moons of the giant planets – a mission to an ocean-bearing gas giant moon.
- From temperate exoplanets to the Milky Way – a mission to either characterize exoplanets or investigate the Milky Way's formation history.
- New physical probes of the early Universe – a mission to investigate the early universe through the cosmic microwave background, gravitational waves, or other fundamental astrophysical phenomena.

On 25 March 2024, ESA announced that the first Large-class mission of Voyage 2050 (L4) would focus on Enceladus under the "Moons of the giant planets" theme.

==== Medium class (Voyage 2050) ====
Three candidates for the first Medium-class of Voyage 2050 (M7) were studied in preparation for selection expected in 2026 and adoption in 2028: M-Matisse (Mars Magnetosphere Atmosphere Ionosphere and Space weather science), Plasma Observatory (Earth's plasma environment), and THESEUS (Transient High-Energy Sky and Early Universe Surveyor to study high-energy cosmic events). Plasma Observatory was recommended for implementation as M7 in June 2026 and officially selected on 19 November 2026.

Simultaneously with the selection of Plasma Observatory for M7, ESA selected four mission proposals for M8: CALICO+, a Ceres orbiter and mini-lander, FOSSIL, an observatory measuring spectral distortions in the cosmic microwave background, PRIAMOS, a sample return mission from a primitive D-type near-Earth asteroid, and SPARK, a solar flares observatory.

==== Fast class (Voyage 2050) ====
In November 2026, ESA selected three mission proposals for F3: GRINTA, a gamma-ray observatory, MUSTI, a far-ultraviolet observatory for spectroscopy of massive stars, and SIRIUS, an extreme-ultraviolet observatory.

== Missions ==
Horizon 2000

- Cornerstone 1 – SOHO, launched December 1995, operational – Joint ESA-NASA Solar observation mission providing real-time data for space weather forecasting.
- Cornerstone 1 – Cluster, launched June 1996, failed – Earth observation mission using four identical spacecraft to study the planet's magnetosphere. Failed on launch.
  - Re-launch – Cluster II, launched July and August 2000, completed – Successful replacement mission.
- Cornerstone 2 – XMM-Newton, launched December 1999, operational – An X-ray space observatory, studying the full range of cosmic X-ray sources.
- Cornerstone 3 – Rosetta, launched March 2004, completed – 67P/Churyumov–Gerasimenko orbiter mission, studying comets and their evolution.
- Cornerstone 4 – Herschel, launched May 2009, completed – Infrared space observatory mission for general astronomy.
- Medium 1 – Huygens, launched October 1997, completed – Titan lander component of the Cassini–Huygens mission; first landing in the outer solar system.
- Medium 2 – INTEGRAL, launched October 2002, completed – Gamma ray space observatory, also capable of observing X-ray and visible wavelengths.
- Medium 3 – Planck, launched May 2009, completed – Cosmology mission that mapped the cosmic microwave background and its anisotropies.

Horizon 2000 Plus

- Mission 1 – Gaia, launched December 2013, completed – Astrometry mission measuring positions and distances of over one billion objects in the Milky Way.
- Mission 2 – LISA Pathfinder, launched December 2015, completed – Demonstration of technologies for the Cosmic Vision LISA Gravitational-wave observatory mission.
- Mission 3 – BepiColombo, launched October 2018, operational – Joint ESA-JAXA reconnaissance mission to Mercury, using two unique spacecrafts operating respectively.

Cosmic Vision

- L1 – JUICE, launched April 2023, with an orbital insertion in 2031, operational – Jupiter orbiter mission, focused on studying the Galilean moons Europa, Ganymede and Callisto.
- L2 – Athena, launching 2035, future – X-ray space observatory mission, designed as a successor to the XMM-Newton telescope.
- L3 – LISA, launching 2035, future – the first dedicated gravitational wave space observatory mission.
- M1 – Solar Orbiter, launched February 2020, operational – Solar observatory mission, designed to perform remote sensing and in-situ studies of the Sun at a perihelion of 0.28 astronomical units.
- M2 – Euclid, launched July 2023, operational – Visible and near-infrared space observatory mission focused on dark matter and dark energy.
- M3 – PLATO, launching 2026, future – TESS-like space observatory mission, aimed at discovering and observing exoplanets.
- M4 – ARIEL, launching 2031, future – Infrared space observatory mission studying the atmosphere of known exoplanets.
- M5 – EnVision, launching in 2031, future – Venus mapping orbiter mission.
- S1 – CHEOPS, launched December 2019, operational – Space observatory mission focused on studying known exoplanets.
- S2 – SMILE, launched May 2026, operational – Joint ESA-CAS Earth observation mission, studying the interaction between the planet's magnetosphere and solar wind.
- F1 – Comet Interceptor, launching in 2029, future
- F2 – ARRAKIHS, launching in the early 2030s, future – Survey of one hundred nearby galaxies and their surroundings to investigate dwarf galaxies and stellar streams.

Voyage 2050

- M7 – Plasma Observatory, launching in 2037, future
- L4 – Enceladus mission, launching in 2042, future (proposed)

== See also ==
- List of European Space Agency programs and missions
- List of Solar System probes
- List of space telescopes
- Living Planet Programme
