= Centro de Estudios de Fisica del Cosmos de Aragon =

Research institute, Spain

Aragon Center for Physics of the Cosmos
- Centro de Estudios de Física del Cosmos de Aragón
- Type: Research institute
- Established: July 22, 2008; 18 years ago
- Founder: Mariano Moles Villamate
- Director: Javier Cenarro Lagunas
- Academic staff: 23 (as of 2023/10)
- Total staff: 61 (as of 2023/10)
- Location: Teruel, Spain
- Website: www.cefca.es

The Centro de Estudios de Física del Cosmos de Aragón (CEFCA) is a Research institute in Teruel, Spain. Established in 2008 as a private foundation of public initiative by the Government of Aragon. Besides research in astronomy, and leading several large astronomical surveys, CEFCA is the operator of the Astrophysical Observatory of Javalambre (OAJ, recognized as Unique Science and Technology Infrastructure by the national government). The primary research interests at CEFCA are in Stellar evolution, Time-domain astronomy and Galaxy evolution.

== History ==
CEFCA was officially established in July 2008 with Mariano Moles Villamate as the founding director. The founding of CEFCA is intertwined with that of the OAJ, see the history of OAJ for more. Some key dates in CEFCA's history include:

- 2008: CEFCA is established.
- 2009: First meeting of CEFCA Steering committee (Patronato de la Fundación CEFCA) and launch of project (allowing hiring of staff).
- 2010: CEFCA moved to its current location (in Teruel's Plaza San Juan).
- 2014: OAJ was recognized as a national Unique Scientific and Technical Infrastructure.
- 2016: Javier Cenarro Lagunas became the director.

== Location ==
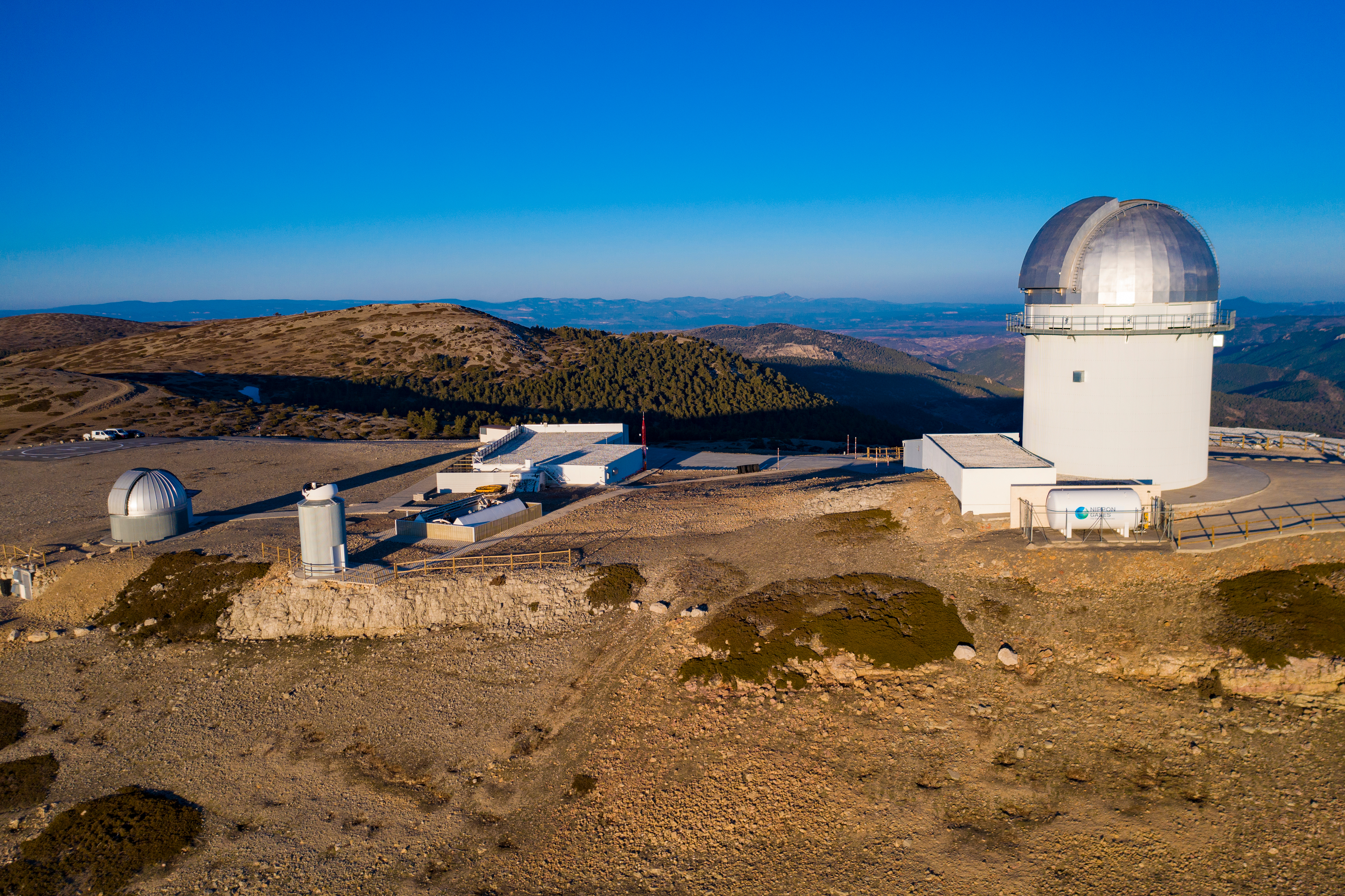
Astrophysical Observatory of Javalambre (OAJ) located in the Teruel province and operated by CEFCA.

CEFCA is geographically located in the following installations within the Province of Teruel.

- The CEFCA headquarters are located in the historical center of Teruel (at Plaza San Juan, number 1). In a building that was previously owned by the Teruel branch of the Bank of Spain.
- The Astrophysical Observatory of Javalambre (OAJ), which is located on the "Buitre" peak of the Sierra de Javalambre.
- CEFCA's main High performance computing facility (Unit for Processing and Archival of Data) is located in the Government of Aragon building of Teruel.
- CEFCA's main outreach facility is GALACTICA, which is an astronomy museum as well as facilities for Amateur astronomy. It is located on the base of the Pico de Buitre (where OAJ is located on the summit) in the Arcos de las Salinas village.

== Academics ==
CEFCA's academic activity can be classified in the following fields

=== Graduate program ===
CEFCA's graduate program is composed of multiple levels:

- Summer internships:
  - CEFCA provides funding for M.Sc students from any Spanish university to stay in Teruel for July and August to conduct a short research project with CEFCA's research staff.
  - Google Summer of Code projects that are available internationally and are done remotely.
- M.Sc final project: this is a one-year project conducted by M.Sc students in Spain. CEFCA's research staff propose research topics for the students of any Spanish university. The students conduct their research in their host university, but under the supervision of the CEFCA research staff.
- PhD program: A number of PhD students from any university are regularly funded and trained by CEFCA for the full 4-year period of a PhD course in Spain and are based in Teruel. Previous universities that CEFCA has cooperated with for this purpose include University of Zaragoza and Complutense University of Madrid.

=== Astrophysics ===
CEFCA's astrophysics research can be categorized in the following fields; primarily using data from the Astrophysical Observatory of Javalambre (OAJ); but not limited to them.

- Wide-field Astronomical surveys: design and conduction of wide-field, multi-filter astronomical surveys. This includes surveys like J-PAS (planned to be +8000 square degrees in 57 filters), J-PLUS (+3000 square degrees in data release 3 in 12 filters), Mini-HAWKs (on-going), J-ALFIN (on-going), MUDEHaR (on-going) and North-PHASE (on-going).
- Astroinformatics: Including the data processing, archiving and analysis of the large volume the wide field imaging data that is produced by the observatory. The OAJ has a dedicated Department for Processing and Archival of Data (DPAD) for this purpose which contains staff researchers, technical astronomers and engineers. Furthermore, DPAD is also in charge of the ARRAKIHS mission data reduction pipeline (known as the ARRAKIHS Harvester).
- Time-domain astronomy: imaging large portions of the sky in various times allows the study of asteroids in the Solar System (which move in the sky), variable stars within the Milky Way (which change brightness), or supernova in other galaxies
- Stellar and galaxy evolution: the very wide field of view, and the many filters of the surveys conducted at OAJ allow accurate measurements of thousands of stars and galaxies in each exposure.

== See also ==
- J-PAS
- ARRAKIHS
- Astrophysical Observatory of Javalambre
- Instituto de Astrofísica de Canarias
- Instituto de Astrofísica de Andalucía
