= Plasma Observatory =

European space mission

- Operator: ESA
- Website: plasma-observatory.inaf.it
- Mission duration: 3 years (planned)

Start of mission
- Launch date: 2037 (planned)

Orbital parameters
- Reference system: Geocentric

Plasma Observatory is a future space mission under development by the European Space Agency (ESA) as a medium-class mission (M7) within the agency's Science programme. Its purpose is to study how charged particles interact with Earth's magnetic field in order to improve the understanding of space weather. The mission will consist of one mother spacecraft (MSC) carrying an advanced suite of instruments and six identical daughter spacecraft (DSC) with simpler instruments. It builds on the legacy of the previous European mission Cluster. It is expected to launch in 2037.

== Instruments ==
The Swedish Institute for Space Physics (IRF) leads the consortia developing the Electric Field Instrument (EFI) and Fields and Wave Processor (FWP) on MSC. The mission's plasma wave analyser instrument is being developed by the Czech Institute of Atmospheric Physics with contributions from the Laboratory of Physics and Chemistry of the Environment and Space in Orléans, France. The PAFI instrument is being developed by Space Research Center of Polish Academy of Sciences.

== History ==
In November 2023, Plasma Observatory was selected as one of 3 candidates for the M7 mission (M5 is EnVision; M6 was cancelled for budgetary reasons), alongside the Mars orbiter M-MATISSE and the space telescope THESEUS. It was recommended for implementation in June 2026 and officially selected on 19 November 2026.

== See also ==
- List of European Space Agency programs and missions
