= Astrophysical Observatory of Javalambre =

Astronomical observatory in Spain

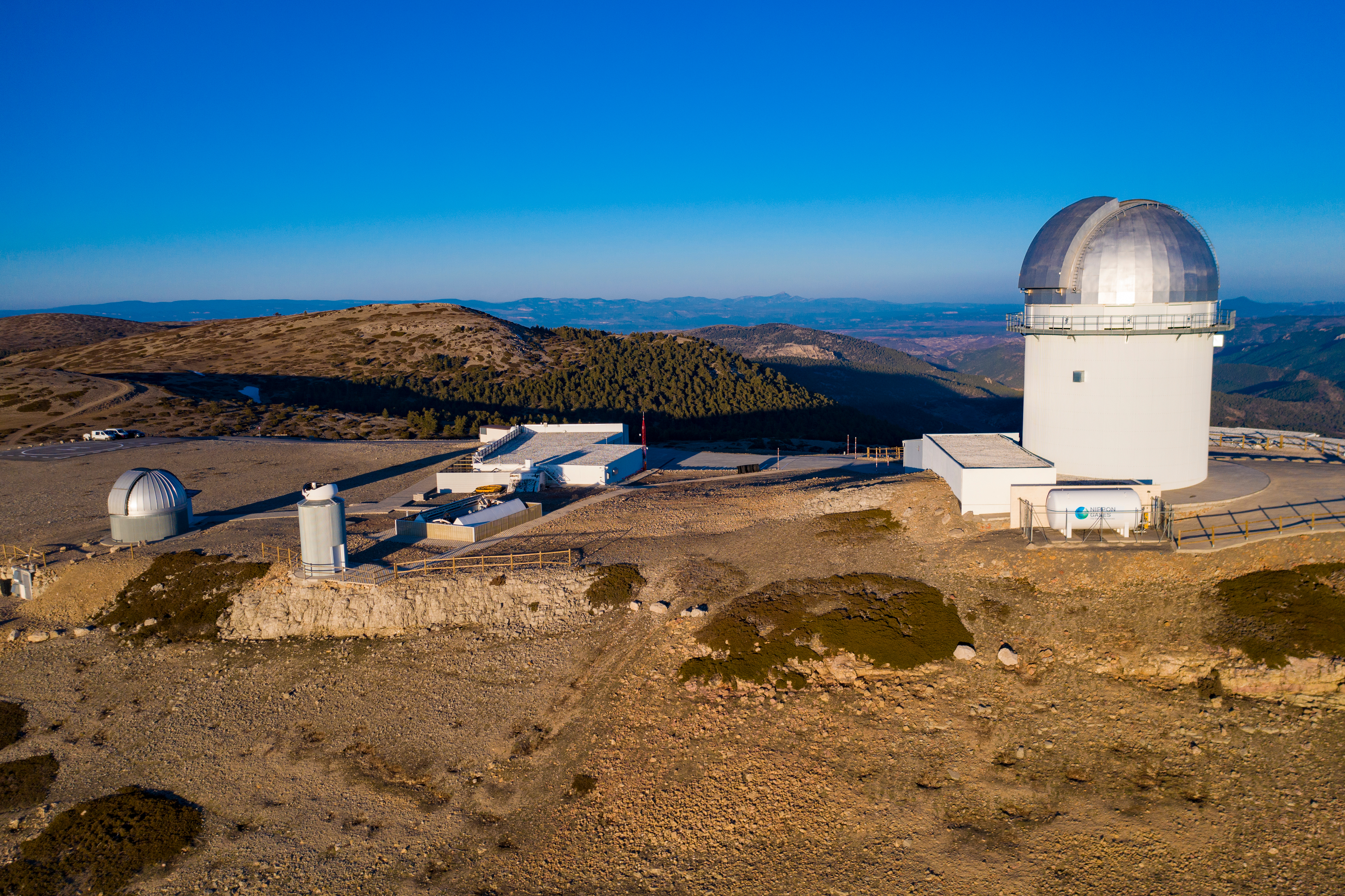
- Alternative names: OAJ
- Organization: Centro de Estudios de Fisica del Cosmos de Aragon
- Location: Arcos de las Salinas, Province of Teruel, Aragon, Spain
- Coordinates: 40°02′29″N 1°00′59″W
- Altitude: 1,957 m (6,421 ft)
- Website: oajweb.cefca.es/,%20https://oajweb.cefca.es/oaj/principal
- Telescopes: Javalambre Auxiliary Survey Telescope; Javalambre Survey Telescope
- Location of Astrophysical Observatory of Javalambre
- Related media on Commons

The Astrophysical Observatory of Javalambre (Spanish: Observatorio Astrofísico de Javalambre) is a Spanish astronomical observatory located in the municipality of Arcos de las Salinas, Teruel. The facilities are located in the Pico del Buitre 1957 meters up in the Sierra de Javalambre. The observatory is managed by the Aragon Center for Physics of the Cosmos (CEFCA), dependent on the Department of Science, university and Knowledge Society Government of Aragon.

== History ==
=== First phase; the location (1989-1992) ===
At the end of the 1980s, a search for the of quality sites for astronomical observation in the Iberian Peninsula identified, among others, the Sierra de Javalambre as a candidate. The proposal to study the Sierra de Javalambre, with a view to creating an observatory and an astrophysics research center, was approved and financed by the Spanish National Research Council (CSIC) together with the Government of Aragon through its Research Advisory Council. Funds were obtained for equipment and two PhD scholarships. The local institutions, City Council and Provincial Council of Teruel, contributed with material and a third grant.

The studies were carried out with scarce means and in situ measurements could only be obtained in the period from May to September 1992. A 25 cm Meade telescope was used, with a photometer to measure extinction and with a photographic camera first, and then a CCD to obtain stellar traces and stellar images with which to measure seeing. The telescope was installed on a 6m high tower built for this purpose. A radiometer and a basic weather station were also available.

The observations were complemented with satellite data analysis from 1983 to 1988, which allowed a first characterization of the site. Due to the lack of funds to ensure a minimum infrastructure that would allow work to continue during the following winter and spring, the measurements were interrupted. The telescope and its equipment were later loaned by the Ministry of Education to the Asociación de Astrónomos de Teruel and installed in the San Blas village, near the city of Teruel.

The data obtained indicated that this is a quality site for observation, both in terms of seeing, extinction and sky background, which indicated a sky without aerosols and very dark. Finally, the satellite data gave 53% completely clear days and 17% overcast days. However, the data that could be accumulated in the short period of observations were not sufficient to draw statistically valid conclusions and the survey could only point to the potential of the site, but not confirm it.

=== Second phase; scientific need (2007-2009) ===
In 2007 a large group of Astrophysics and High Energy Physics scientists was organized to propose a Dark Energy project to the CONSOLIDER-Ingenio program of the Spanish Ministry of Education and Science. Once Phase 1 of the proposal was approved, different concrete options were considered, and the measurement of Baryon Acoustic Oscillations (BAO) was proposed as the central proposal. This measurement would be made from a photometric mapping of about 8,000 square degrees with narrow filters, which could provide redshift values with the required accuracy and for a sufficient number of sources. Coinciding with the time of the process of defining the proposal for Phase 2 of the CONSOLIDER-Ingenio project, at the beginning of April 2007 the possibility of taking up again the Javalambre project to build a telescope with the appropriate characteristics for the scientific project under consideration was opened. Given the immediate support of the authorities of the Departments of Science, Technology and University and of the Presidency of the Government of Aragon, the option of building a telescope at Javalambre was included in the Project "Physics of the Accelerating Universe", PAU, which was subsequently approved by the MEC.

A two-fold process then began to carry out both the systematic characterization of the quality of the chosen site and the concept study of the proposed telescope.

==== Site Testing of Pico del Buitre, Sierra de Javalambre ====
Once the seeing (ROBODIMM) and extinction (EXCALIBUR) monitors were acquired, the measurement campaign began in March 2008. The ROBODIMM monitor was calibrated against the one used at Calar Alto Observatory, which in turn had been calibrated against a "Generalized Monitor Seeing" in May 2002. A weather station was also in operation since March 2008. Finally, a 400mm MEADE telescope with an SBIG spectrograph was used to obtain spectral measurements of the sky background.

In parallel, a study on cloud cover was commissioned using high-resolution satellite images of the Pico del Buitre area for the years 2005 and 2006. The conclusions of the first 18 months of measurements at Pico del Buitre have been published in the PASP journal.

==== Conceptual study of the proposed telescope ====
In the second half of 2007, 5 companies were contacted to carry out a conceptual study for a large-field, ~2m aperture telescope with high image quality over the entire field. The studies were reviewed in May 2008 by a commission of experts composed by J. Spyromiglio (ESO, chairman), B. Delabre (ESO), H. Epps (University of Santa Cruz, California), M. Doblaré (University of Zaragoza), F. J. Castander (ICE, PAU member) and V. J. Martínez (University of Valencia, PAU member). The report contains recommendations on technical, manufacturing and process management aspects that were extremely valuable for the continuation of the project.

==== Proposal and evaluation of the Javalambre Project ====
The Javalambre project was proposed for consideration to the authorities of the MEC, CSIC and the Government of Aragon. On November 23, 2007, the heads of these three institutions agreed to promote the project and established the procedure to be followed (DR1). A person in charge of the project was proposed with the task of preparing a report to be evaluated by internationally recognized experts. Once the appointment was made (DR2), the Report was prepared with the collaboration of numerous scientists from our community and delivered in July 2008 (DR3). The result of the evaluation, which was totally positive, was communicated at the beginning of 2009. The Report contains as the main scientific focus for the first years the measurement of BAO as proposed in the PAU project. At the same time, other domains are considered to which the proposed mapping can provide relevant data. It also contains a description of the conditions of the site chosen for the Observatory and of the telescopes. Finally, the strategy and philosophy of the proposed center, CEFCA, is presented. The PAU collaboration published the details and expectations of the mapping to measure BAO.

=== Current phase: CEFCA and the OAJ ===
The first meeting of the CEFCA Board took place in January 2009. In May of the same year, the incorporation of researchers and engineers into CEFCA began. On 23 September 2009, the investment budget for the Astrophysical Observatory of Javalambre (OAJ) was approved. The funding comes from the TERUEL INVERSION FUND (FITE in Spanish), to which 50% are contributed by the Government of Spain and the Government of Aragon. In early October 2009, the tendering for it was announced, which includes the design and construction of telescopes, domes and buildings. The tender process chosen was that of competitive dialogue, which in the Public Sector Contracts Law is considered particularly appropriate for the supply of sophisticated scientific equipment. Once the initial bids were submitted, the dialogue phase was conducted in two rounds of discussions with each bidder, after which it was concluded by mutual agreement between the bidder and each of the bidders (December 2009). Once the final bids were received from the bidders, they were evaluated. The part corresponding to the telescopes was evaluated by a technical commission. The proposal, made unanimously, was submitted to the Contracting Committee, which also accepted it unanimously. The contract was signed on March 22, 2010, with the joint venture formed by the companies AMOS and Torrescámara, the former being responsible for the construction of the telescopes.

== Mission ==
The initial objective of the OAJ is to map all the visible space to study Dark Energy and Astrophysics. The observatory mainly carries out two projects, J-PLUS and J-PAS. In addition, the observatory gives a percentage of their hours of observation to other research projects through competitive access calls as the projects: J-ALFIN, MUDEHaR and North-PHASE .

== Telescopes ==
The OAJ mainly consists of two professional wide field of view (FoV) telescopes with good image quality throughout the field:

- The JST250 (Javalambre Survey Telescope), a 255 cm wide range telescope with a 7.06 degree field of view which is primarily being used for the J-PAS survey.
- The JAST80 (Javalambre Auxiliary Survey Telescope) with a 3.14 degree field of view.
- The on-ground demonstrator (OGD) of the ARRAKIHS mission.

The JST250 and JAST80 are equipped with state-of-the-art panoramic cameras with large format CCDs and a unique set of optical filters specially designed to map the Universe across the entire optical spectrum range unprecedented in international astrophysics.
