= 453 Tea =

Main-belt asteroid

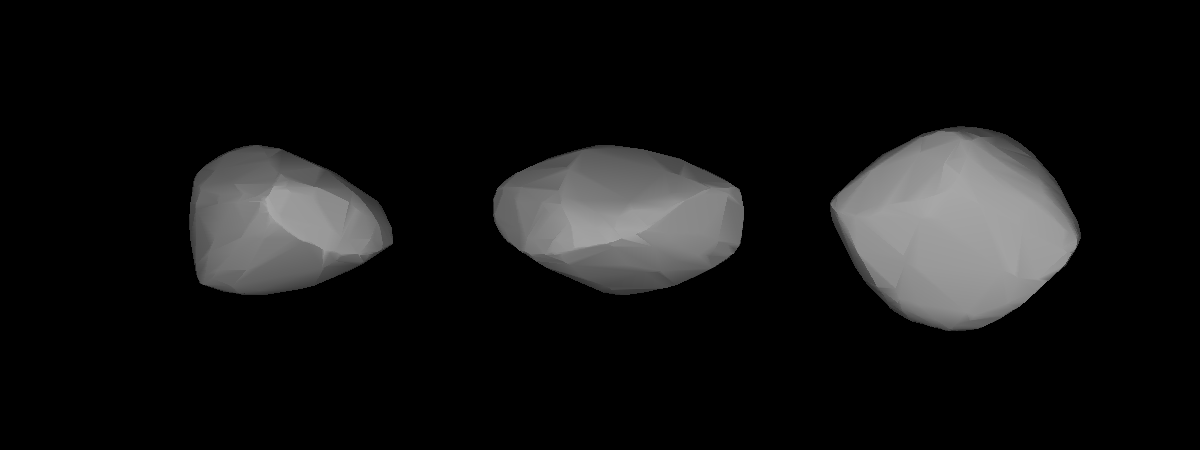
- Lightcurve-base 3D-model of 453 Tea.

Discovery
- Discovered by: Auguste Charlois
- Discovery site: Nice
- Discovery date: 22 February 1900

Designations
- Pronunciation: French: [te.a]
- Alternative designations: 1900 FA
- Minor planet category: Main belt (Flora family)

Orbital characteristics
- Epoch 31 July 2016 (JD 2457600.5)
- Uncertainty parameter 0
- Observation arc: 116.15 yr (42424 d)
- Aphelion: 2.4219 AU (362.31 Gm)
- Perihelion: 1.9452 AU (291.00 Gm)
- Semi-major axis: 2.1836 AU (326.66 Gm)
- Eccentricity: 0.1092
- Orbital period (sidereal): 3.23 yr (1178.6 d)
- Mean anomaly: 318.7251°
- Mean motion: 0° 18^{m} 19.8^{s} / day
- Inclination: 5.5512°
- Longitude of ascending node: 11.7240°
- Time of perihelion: 2023-May-27
- Argument of perihelion: 220.40893°

Physical characteristics
- Dimensions: 20.93±1.1 km
- Synodic rotation period: 6.811 ± 0.001 h (0.283792 ± 4.2×10^{−5} d)
- Geometric albedo: 0.1827±0.022
- Spectral type: S
- Absolute magnitude (H): 10.5

453 Tea (Note: Pronounced as two syllables.) is an S-type asteroid belonging to the Flora family in the Main Belt. Its diameter is about 21 km (13 mi) and it has an albedo of 0.183. Its rotation period is 6.4 hours.

In the 1980s Tea was considered as a target for the planned French Vesta spacecraft. The spacecraft was not built.

Tea was discovered by Auguste Charlois on February 22, 1900. Its provisional name was 1900 FA. It is unknown after what it was named.

It came to opposition at apparent magnitude 12.2 on 3 May 2023 and then perihelion on 27 May 2023.
