= J-PAS =

Astronomical survey

Javalambre Physics of the Accelerating Universe Astrophysical Survey
- Alternative names: J-PAS
- Location: Spain
- Coordinates: 40°02′42″N 1°00′36″W
- Website: www.j-pas.org
- Location within Spain

J-PAS (Javalambre Physics of the Accelerating universe Astrophysical Survey) is an astronomical survey is being carried out by the Astrophysical Observatory of Javalambre (OAJ), located in Pico del Buitre in Sierra de Javalambre, in Teruel, Spain. J-PAS officially started in the summer of 2023.

OAJ is managed by Aragon Center for Physics of the Cosmos (CEFCA) and consists of two telescopes: a 2.5-metre primary mirror telescope (JST/T250) and an 80-centimeter telescope (JAST/T80). J-PAS is surveying the sky with JST/T250 telescope which has a 1.2 Giga-pixel camera, constituted by an array of 14 CCDs. J-PAS will observe more than 8000 square degrees (about 1/5 of the whole sky) in 57 filters during 5 to 6 years.

J-PAS filters cover the entire visible region of the electromagnetic spectrum (3500 Å to 10000 Å) and can be classified as:

- 54 narrow-band (roughly 14-nanometer width) filters.
- 2 medium-band (roughly 50-nanometer width) filters; these are located on the extreme blue and extreme red of the spectral coverage of J-PAS filters.
- 1 broad-band iSDSS (roughly 200-nanometer width) filter; which is also used as the detection filter.

== History and members ==
J-PAS was one of the founding ideas behind OAJ, see OAJ history for more. The founding institutes of J-PAS are listed below.

- Centro de Estudios de Fisica del Cosmos de Aragon, in Teruel, Spain.
- Brazilian National Observatory, Rio de Janeiro, Brasil.
- Instituto de Astronomia, Geofísica e Ciências Atmosféricas da Universidade de São Paulo, in São Paulo, Brazil.
- Instituto de Astrofísica de Andalucía-CSIC, in Granada, Spain.

Full J-PAS members are from the founding institutes above; although scientists from other institutes can also apply to become associate members or external collaborators.
