= L4 (spacecraft) =

Proposed mission to Enceladus by the European Space Agency (ESA)

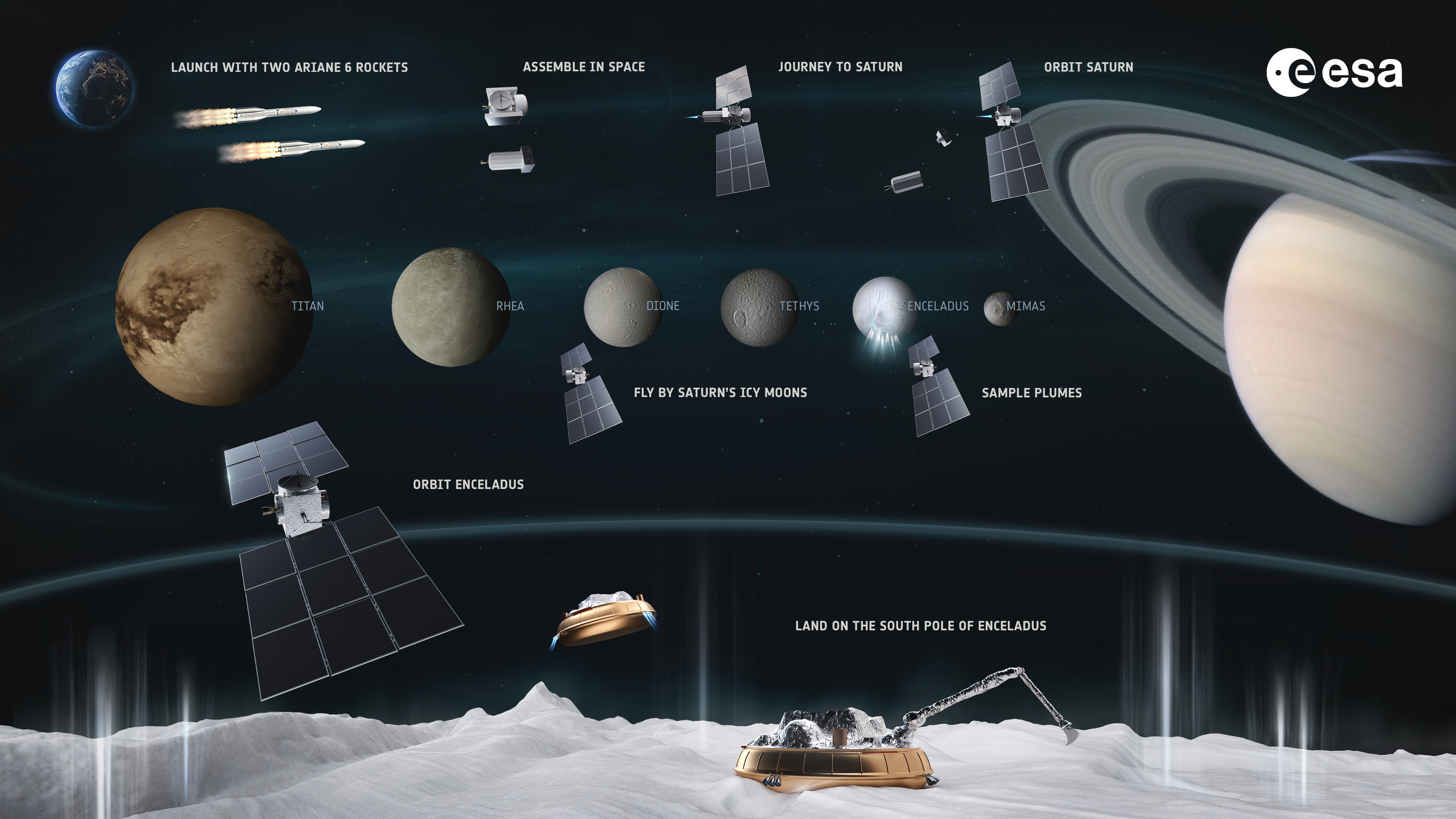
- Mission type: Enceladus orbiter and lander
- Operator: ESA

Start of mission
- Launch date: 2042 (Planned)
- Rocket: Ariane 6

Saturn orbiter

Enceladus orbiter

Enceladus lander
- Landing date: 2052 (planned)

L4 is a proposed mission to Enceladus by the European Space Agency (ESA). If approved, it is expected to be launched in the early 2040s. The mission will consist of an orbiter and a lander. Since 2024, Enceladus has been identified as the European Space Agency's top priority for space exploration due to strong signs of potential habitability.

== Science ==
Enceladus is an icy ocean-bearing moon of the planet Saturn that is considered to have some of the greatest potential to harbour life within the liquid water ocean beneath its icy crust. It is one of the very few geologically active objects in the Solar System as its underground ocean spews out geysers of water. According to planetary scientists, the water in these plumes is in direct contact with the moon's rocky interior, which may contain chemicals necessary for life.

Unlike other ocean planets and moons whose underground oceans are buried underneath miles of thick, solid ice, Enceladus's internal ocean can be observed more directly by analysing the water erupting from its plumes. The possibility of Enceladus's potential habitability was further amplified when the Cassini space probe detected molecules from the moon's watery plumes that life needs to survive such as phosphates and salts.

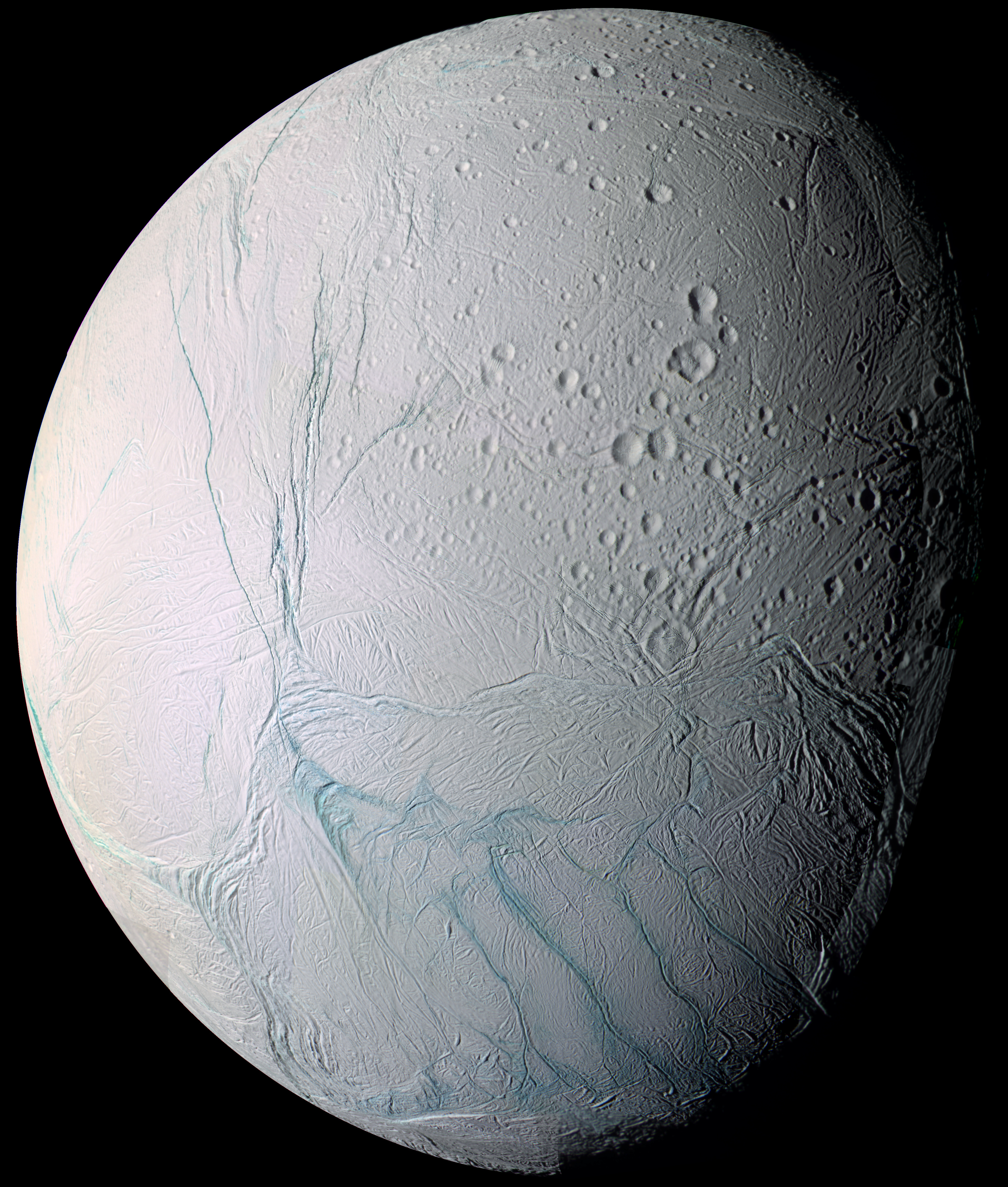
A false-colour photo mosaic of Enceladus. The bluish lines below correspond to the moon's tiger stripes where the moon's underwater geysers erupt from

== Mission profile ==
The L4 probe is proposed to be launched in the early 2040s aboard two new generation Ariane 6 rockets, arriving at Saturn around a decade later. The ESA chart shows that the spacecraft will be composed of two parts which will need to be assembled while in outer space.

Ideally, L4 should arrive at Saturn around the time when the planet and its moons' southern poles are illuminated by the Sun—around Saturn's southern summertime—to allow the space probe to study Enceladus's geysers which are located on the moon's south pole.

After arriving at the Saturn system, the probe will then perform multiple flybys of Enceladus and Saturn's other icy moons, including Titan, Rhea, Dione, Tethys, and Mimas. After performing multiple sampling of the moon's geysers while in orbit, the L4 spacecraft will then land on Enceladus' south pole where the active geysers are located. The landing is envisioned to take place in 2052. The lander may use rollable solar arrays.

== Project history ==
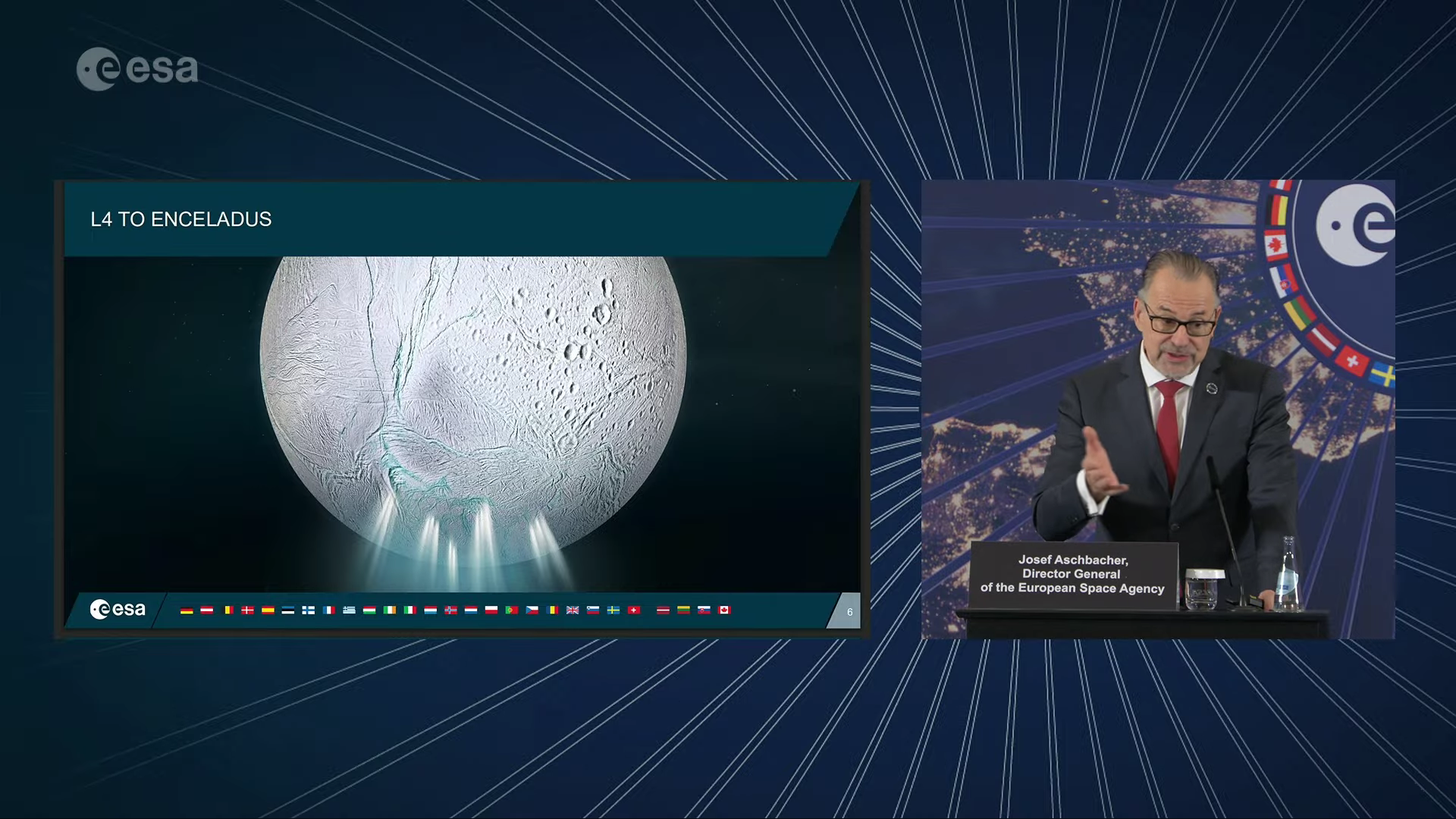
ESA Director General Josef Aschbacher giving a short presentation on the agency's proposed L4 mission during the ministerial council in 2025

Between 2018 and 2021, ESA scientists worked on defining priorities for Voyage 2050, a next phase of ESA's Science Programme after Cosmic Vision. They identified three priority themes for the programme's large-scale missions: the Solar System's icy moons (with Enceladus as a prime candidate for an astrobiology-focused mission), exoplanets, and the nature of the early Universe. The 2023-2032 Planetary Science Decadal Survey, published by US scientists in 2022, listed a mission to Enceladus as its second priority for the decade.

In 2024, ESA identified Enceladus as the most promising target for its next L-class mission to be implemented within the Voyage 2050 programme after JUICE (L1), LISA (L2), and Athena (L3). During the 2025 ministerial council of ESA member states, which committed to the largest budget for the agency so far, Director General Josef Aschbacher mentioned L4 to Enceladus as one of the agency's top potential future projects.

In 2026, the mission's team had to start reworking the proposal, as it was originally planned for launch on the "Block 3" updated version of Ariane 64 (also known as "Ariane 64 Evo") which was cancelled. The team refocused on using the final expected version of the rocket, Ariane 64 Block 2, or an alternative launch vehicle.

== See also ==
- List of ESA programmes and missions
- Ocean Worlds Exploration Program
- Abiogenesis
- Astrobiology
