= GUSTO =

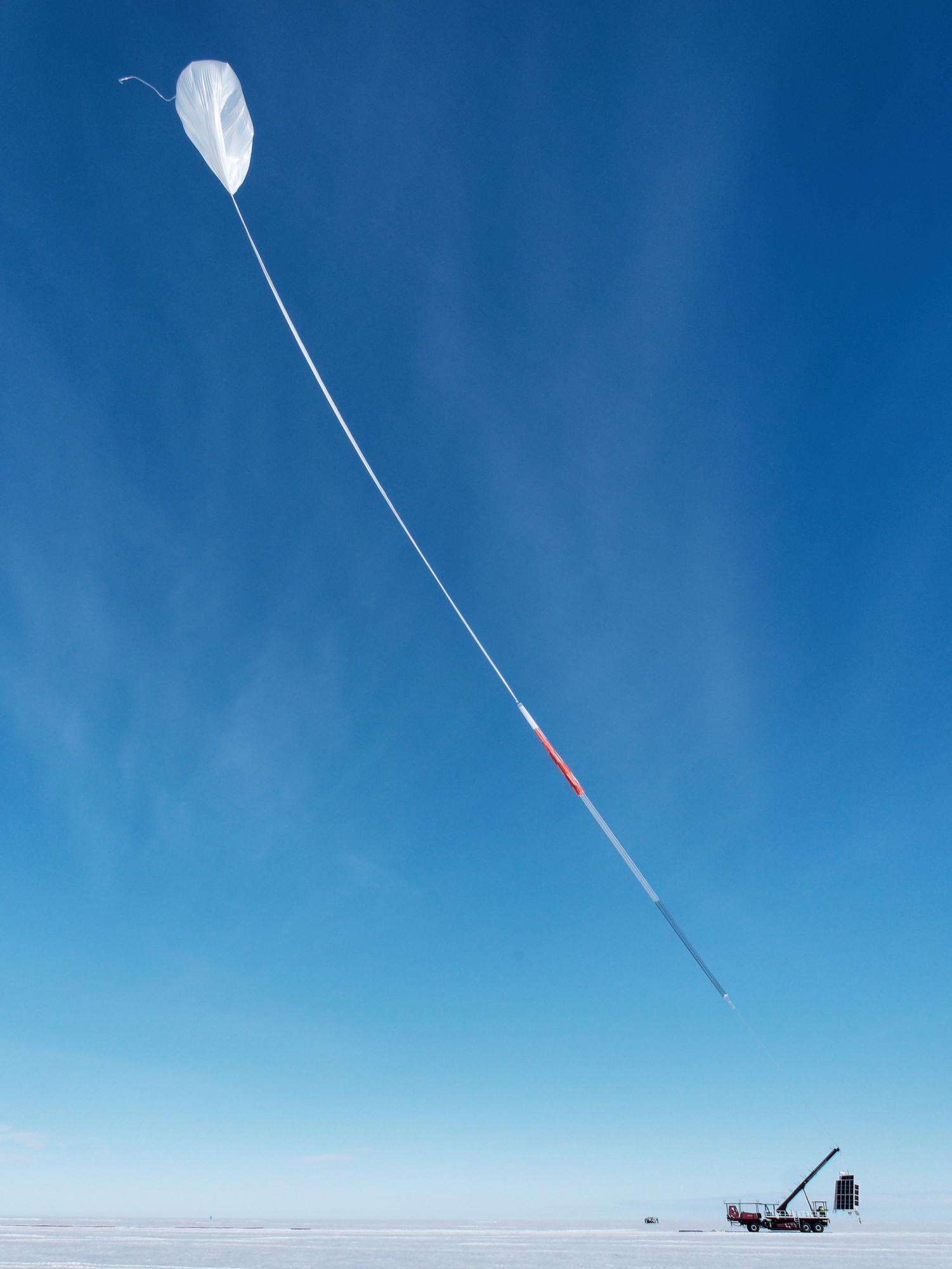
GUSTO at launch

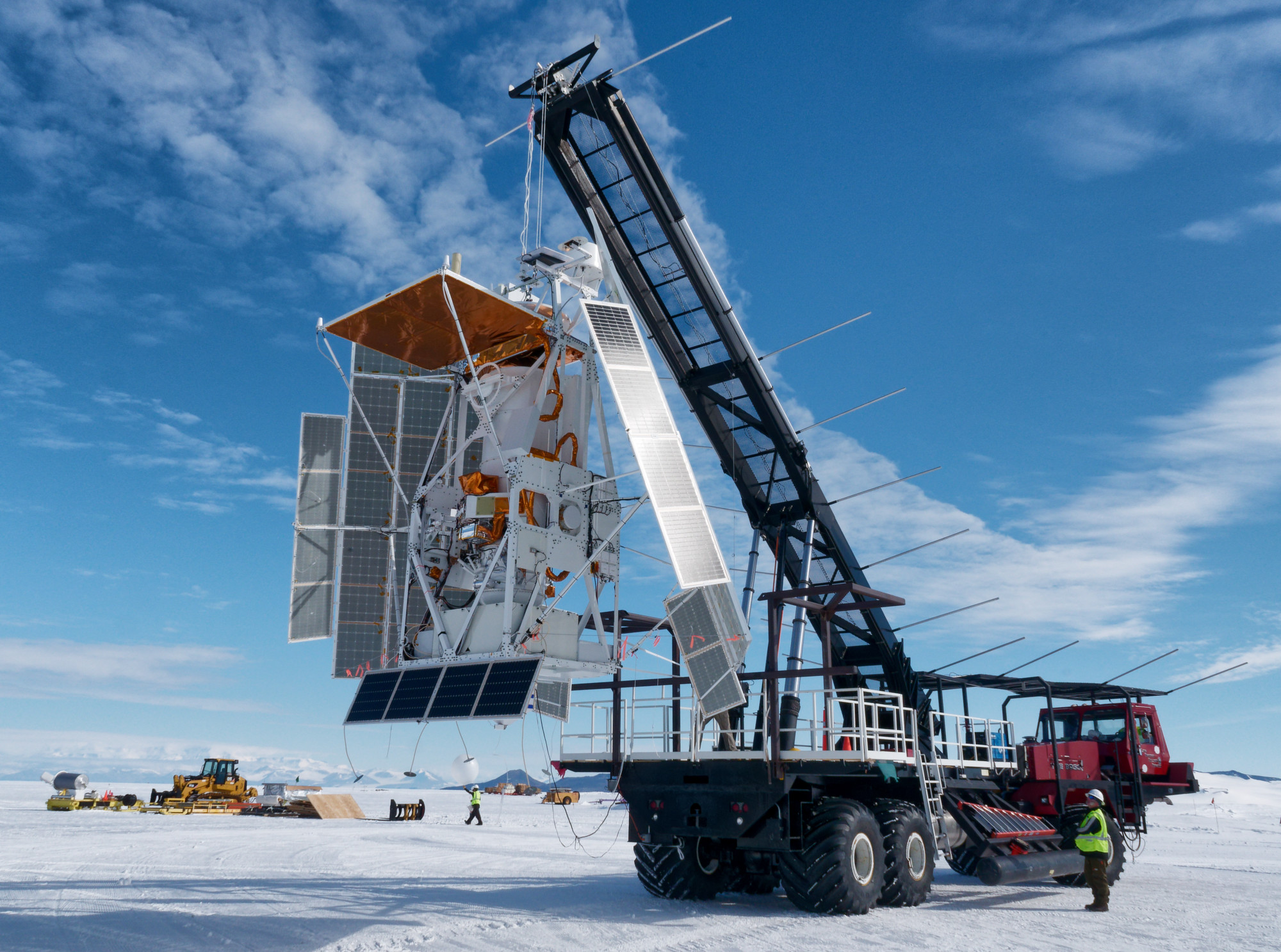
GUSTO before launch

GUSTO (Galactic / Extragalactic ULDB Spectroscopic Terahertz Observatory) is a high-altitude balloon mission that carries an infrared telescope to measure fine-structure line emission from the interstellar medium. The mission was developed by NASA's Explorers Program, and was launched on 31 December 2023 from Antarctica.

== Overview ==
GUSTO is expected to provide the first complete study of the life cycle of the interstellar medium, the gas and dust from which all stars and planets are formed. The mission is a Mission of Opportunity (MO) of NASA's Explorer's Program and is expected to cost about US$40 million. It follows from the experience gained from two precursor or "pathfinder" missions: the Stratospheric Terahertz Observatory (STO) launched on 15 January 2012, and STO-2 launched on 8 December 2016. The principal investigator is Christopher Walker at the University of Arizona in Tucson, Arizona.

The telescope was lifted by a superpressure balloon to the stratosphere at an altitude of 36 km (22 mi) above Antarctica, at the edge of space. It mapped portions of the Milky Way galaxy and the Large Magellanic Cloud in three specific regions of the far infrared (FIR) portion of the electromagnetic spectrum called the "terahertz lines of carbon, nitrogen and oxygen".

GUSTO was launched on 31 December 2023, 06:30 UTC, from McMurdo, Antarctica, and stayed airborne for 57 days, 7 hours, 38 minutes, before landing safely in Antarctica on 26 February 2024. GUSTO was controlled and monitored from several stations around the United States.

== Objective ==
The objective of GUSTO is to provide the first complete spectroscopic study of all phases of the stellar life cycle, from the formation of molecular clouds (also called stellar nurseries), through star birth and evolution, to the formation of interstellar gas clouds and the re-initiation of the cycle. This would help determine the composition, energetics, and dynamics of the interstellar medium. It will do so by observing simultaneously in three specific far infrared (FIR) wavelengths. The researchers state that "this unique and novel combination of data will provide information needed to untangle the complexities of the interstellar medium".

== Telescope and detectors ==
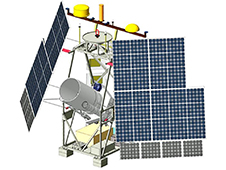
An artist's concept of the GUSTO mission gondola carrying the telescope, cryocoolers, and solar panels. Mass is about 2 tons.

The gondola, avionics and solar panels were provided by the Johns Hopkins Applied Physics Laboratory. The University of Arizona in Tucson provided the telescope with an array of cryogenic terahertz radiation superconducting heterodyne detectors built in a collaborative effort with the Massachusetts Institute of Technology (MIT), Arizona State University, the Netherlands Institute for Space Research (SRON), Virginia Diodes (VDI), and Ball Aerospace. The detectors measure the terahertz lines of carbon, oxygen and nitrogen, at 4.7, 1.4 and 1.9 terahertz.

The gondola and instruments carried by the balloon have an approximate mass of 2,000 kg (4,400 lb) and measures about 6 m wide by 6 m height (20 ft × 20 ft). The telescope has a 90 cm (35 in) mirror, which directs light to a series of superconducting detectors contained inside a cryostat that will keep them at −269 °C (−452 °F).

== Balloon ==
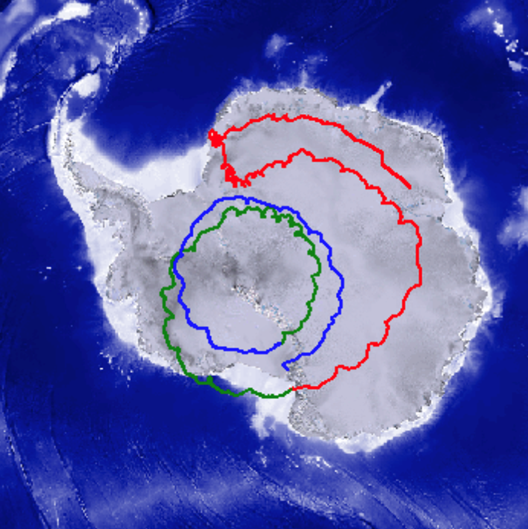
GUSTO's 57-days route over Antarctica

Originally proposed for use on a ULDB (UltraLong Duration Balloon) Superpressure balloon, issues with qualification of the balloon resulted in use of an alternative 39 million cubic feet volume, zero pressure balloon. The balloon was provided by NASA's Balloon Program Office.

The flight was designed to make use of a weather phenomenon known as an anticyclone that occurs during the Antarctic summer. The wind vortex would take the balloon on a circular flight trajectory over Antarctica for 55 to 120 days. Recovery was uncertain for GUSTO; as the southern winter progresses, the polar vortex weakens and the balloon could have left Antarctica and drifted northward. Upon mission completion on 26 February 2024, GUSTO descended by parachute and landed safely on Antarctic soil.
