= Vesta (spacecraft) =

Soviet space mission

- Operator: IKI

Spacecraft properties
- Launch mass: ~2,000 kg (4,400 lb) including 500 kg (1,100 lb) penetrator
- Power: 350 W

Start of mission
- Launch date: 1994 (proposed)

Flyby of Mars
- Closest approach: proposed

Flyby of Asteroids
- Closest approach: various dates and bodies proposed

Asteroid impactor
- Impact date: various dates and bodies proposed

Vesta was a planned multiple-asteroid-flyby mission that the Soviet Union assessed in the 1980s. The Vesta mission would have consisted of two identical probes (just like earlier Soviet Venus missions), to be launched in 1991. Similar to the Vega program, each spacecraft would deploy one or more landers or balloons into the Venusian atmosphere, and then proceed to its next target.

At Venus, a French satellite dedicated to asteroid flybys would be released. It would return for an Earth gravity assist, and then reach about 3–3.3 au from the Sun. There they would fly by some smaller asteroids, and Vesta, if possible, with a small probe landing there.

The exact targets would depend on the launch date. In the initial 1985 study, 2700 possible trajectories were analyzed for a launch date in 1991/1992. Considering all constraints, about 12 candidate trajectories were selected. The two identical spacecraft could have different trajectories and targets. These included 5 Astraea, 53 Kalypso, 187 Lamberta, 453 Tea, 1335 Demoulina and 1858 Lobachevskij, and comet Encke.

== Spacecraft design ==
Around 1985 Vesta was changed to be a Mars mission, with the asteroid mission unchanged. Detailed plans called for each probe to visit four small bodies, including asteroids belonging to different classes - providing a representative sample of the diversity of asteroids - and probably one or two comets as well.

Visiting at least one Apollo-Amor (Earth-nearing) asteroid was also given a preference.

Preliminary studies called for at least the following scientific instruments to be included:

- a wide angle camera (~6.5° field of view, 512×512 pixel CCD)
- a narrow angle camera (~0.5° field of view, 512×512 pixel CCD - 3.9 arcsec/pixel)
- a near-infrared spectrometer (measuring between 0.5–5 μm with λ/Δλ = 50, 5 arcminutes per pixel)

Possible further instrumentation:

- UV spectrometer (for imaging during a comet flyby)
- radar altimeter/radiometer
- a dust detector
- ion or neutral gas detector

Onboard memory would be about 240 Mb. Images at closest approach (~500 km) could have a resolution of 10 m/pixel. Worst case downlink rate is 600 bit/second (if not using NASA's Deep Space Network (DSN)). The scientific payload is about 100 kg. The spacecraft had 750 kg dry mass, and carried 750 kg propellants, and possibly a 500 kg penetrator. 20 square meters of solar panels provided 350 W of power.

If DSN support could have been obtained, Doppler tracking of the Vesta spacecraft's movement could accurately determine the mass of the encountered bodies. Should it not, another possibility was considered: releasing a test mass, and observing its movement near the target asteroid.

The spacecraft's structure was derived from telecommunication satellites (INMARSAT), having the required mass, volume, and delta-v capabilities (3-axis stabilized, with a pointing platform with 2 axes of freedom for scientific instruments).

== Trajectory ==
The Mars gravity assist constrains the possible trajectories. The asteroid penetrator also imposes limits on the speed of the approach of the target asteroid (less than 4 km/s).

Nevertheless, 3 possible trajectories were designed, with two Mars gravity assists.

A single Mars swing-by is also possible, but the double gravity assist increases the mass budget of the spacecraft by 30%, at the cost of an additional 1.8 year in travel time to the asteroid belt. The following trajectories are for the 1994 launch window. The size and type of each asteroid is also shown here:

Trajectory 1:

launch from Earth
Mars gravity assist
flyby of 2335 James (a 10 km X-type asteroid) (an Amor-asteroid)
Mars gravity assist
109 Felicitas (C-type, 76 km)
739 Mandeville (EMP(?) type, 110 km)
4 Vesta (V-type, or Vestoid. Has a diameter of 570 km) flyby with 3.5 km/s. A penetrator is released.

Total delta-v: 450 m/s

Trajectory 2:

launch from Earth
Mars gravity assist
flyby of the 157P/Tritton short period comet
Mars gravity assist
2087 Kochera(30 km?)
1 Ceres (flyby & releasing a penetrator)

Total delta-v: 1150 m/s

Trajectory 3:

launch from Earth
Mars gravity assist
1204 Renzia (10 km?) (an Amor-asteroid)
Mars gravity assist
435 Ella (U type, 30 km)
46 Hestia (F type, 165 km)
135 Hertha (M type, 80 km)

Total delta-v: 350 m/s

In other studies 11 Parthenope, 19 Fortuna and 20 Massalia were also considered.

== Cancellation ==
A combination of factors, probably including changing Franco-Soviet relations, the partial failure of the Phobos mission, financial troubles and the disbanding of the Soviet Union, prevented the project from advancing beyond the planning phase.
