= Johan Bleeker =

Dutch space technology scientist

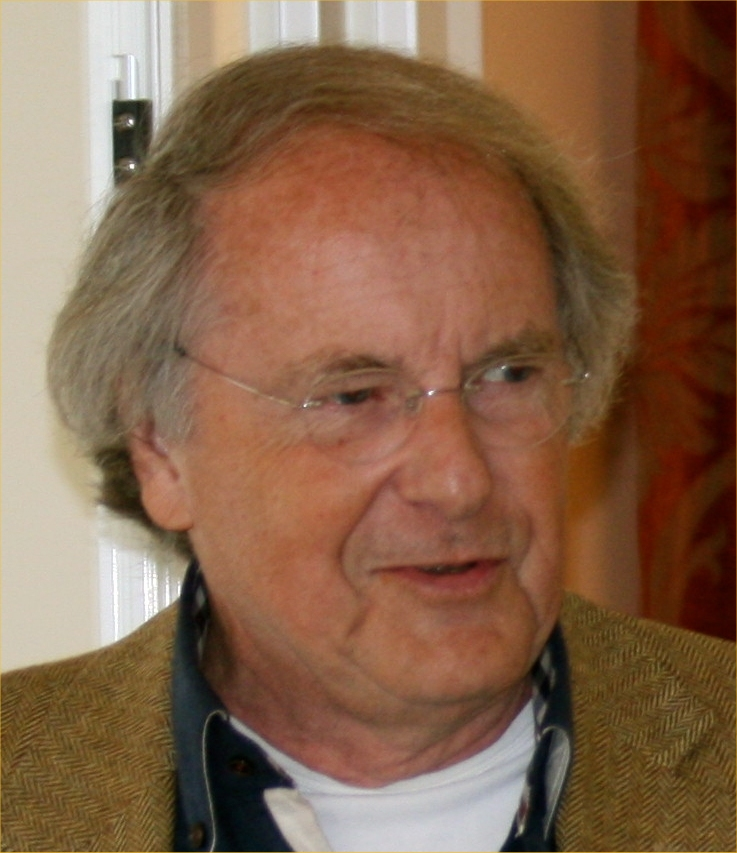
Johan Bleeker (2018)

Johannes Alphonsus Marie "Johan" Bleeker (born 20 July 1942) is a Dutch space research and technology scientist. He was director of the Netherlands Institute for Space Research from 1983 to 2003. He was involved in the setting up of the Horizon 2000 and Horizon 2000+ long term space science programs of the European Space Agency.

== Career ==
Bleeker was born in Leeuwarden on 20 July 1942. He attended the Hogere Burgerschool. Bleeker subsequently studied engineering physics at Delft University of Technology. He continued his studies at Leiden University, where in 1971 he obtained his doctorate under Hendrik C. van de Hulst with a thesis titled: The diffuse X-ray sky.

Bleeker stayed at Leiden University and worked at the Cosmic-Ray Working Group until 1983, during the final two years he was group leader. In 1983 he became director of the Utrecht Laboratory for Space Research, which later became the Netherlands Institute for Space Research. Bleeker was director until 2003, he was succeeded by Karel Wakker.

Apart from his position at the Netherlands Institute for Space Research Bleeker was a professor of space research and exploration at Utrecht University. He was an extraordinary professor (Dutch: buitengewoon hoogleraar) from 1985 to 1991, and was then appointed as full professor. He took up emeritus status in 2007.

== Research ==
The research and projects of Bleeker have covered amongst others: high energy astrophysics, cosmic-ray physics and X-ray astronomy.

Bleeker chaired the Survey Committee that set up the long term space science program Horizon 2000 of the European Space Agency and also took part in establishing the follow-on program Horizon 2000+. In 1996 he publicly criticized the budget constraints on these programs, which were imposed by the European ministers.

== Honors and awards ==
Bleeker was elected member of Royal Netherlands Academy of Arts and Sciences in 1988 and the Academia Europaea in 1989.

In 2002, Bleeker was made a Commander in the Order of the Netherlands Lion. In 2004 he won the basic book award of the International Academy of Astronautics together with Johannes Geiss and Martin C.E. Huber for their 2001 book The Century of Space Science. He was appointed honorary member of the Koninklijk Instituut van Ingenieurs in 2007.

Minor planet 9693 Bleeker is named after him. Bleeker is a corresponding member of the Académie de l'air et de l'espace.
