= Netherlands Institute for Space Research =

SRON

Space Research Organisation Netherlands (SRON)
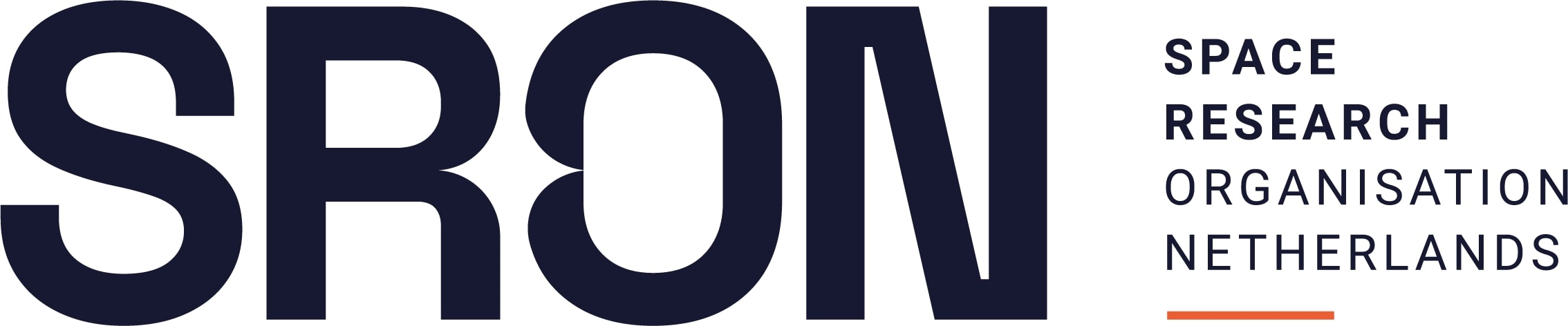

Agency overview
- Abbreviation: SRON
- Formed: 1983; 43 years ago
- Type: Space agency
- Headquarters: Leiden
- Administrator: Michael Wise (Scientific Director)
- Employees: 250
- Website: www.sron.nl

Space Research Organisation Netherlands (SRON) is the Dutch national institute for space research. It focuses on astrophysics, Earth observation, and exoplanetary research. SRON also develops new detection techniques for X-rays, infrared radiation, and visible light. As national expertise institute, SRON gives council to the Dutch government and coordinates national contributions to international space missions.

The Laboratorium voor Ruimteonderzoek (LRO; lit. transl. Laboratory for Space Research) was founded in 1961 in Utrecht as one of SRON's predecessors. In 1983, it joined forces with the space labs in Leiden and Groningen under the name Stichting Ruimteonderzoek Nederland (SRON; lit. transl. Foundation Space-Research Netherlands) as part of the Dutch Research Council (NWO). Later, the Leiden lab merged with the Utrecht location. By 2005, the organization was renamed SRON Netherlands Institute for Space Research and in 2025 Space Research Organisation Netherlands. In 2021, the Utrecht lab was relocated back to Leiden. Since then, SRON has been headquartered in Leiden with additional facilities in Groningen.

== Science and technology ==
The institute has over 250 staff members who are employed across four program lines: Astrophysics, Earth observation, Exoplanets, and Technology, and two groups of expertise: Engineering and Instrument science.

== Instrumentation ==
SRON's develops scientific instruments for space research satellites and conducts scientific research based on the resulting data. It participates in international space missions including those led by the ESA, NASA and JAXA. In the field of astrophysics, SRON mainly contributes to missions regarding infrared (e.g. IRAS, ISO, Herschel), X-rays (e.g. Beppo-SAX, Chandra, XMM-Newton), exoplanets (e.g. PLATO, ARIEL) and gravitational waves (e.g. LISA). SRON also participates in earth observation missions, such as ENVISAT, Sentinel-5p and PACE. SRON-researcher Ilse Aben received the Stevin Prize in 2025 for the societal impact she achieved with the TROPOMI instrument onboard Sentinel-5p.

== Missions and projects ==
=== Current missions or projects with SRON contribution ===
The instrument contributed by SRON is in parentheses.

- Athena (X-IFU)
- Chandra (Low Energy Transmission Grating Spectrometer (LETG))
- XMM-Newton (Reflection Grating Spectrometers (RGS))
- INTEGRAL
- CO2M
- HUBS
- POEMM
- XRISM (Resolve)
- LOFT
- ALMA (2 Band Receivers)
- Sentinel-5p (TROPOMI)
- Sentinel 5 (Immersed Gratings)
- MetOp (GOME-2)
- GUSTO (8-pixel camera)
- ARIEL
- PLATO
- PACE (SPEXone)
- LISA (Quadrant Photo Receivers; Mechanism Control Unit)

=== Previous missions/projects ===
- BeppoSAX (Wide Field Camera)
- Compton Gamma Ray Observatory (COMPTEL)
- Hitomi (High-Resolution Soft X-Ray Spectrometer)
- IRAS
- ISO (Short Wave Spectrometer)
- Astronomical Netherlands Satellite
- GOCE
- ERS-2
- Herschel (HIFI)
- Envisat (SCIAMACHY)

== Technology development ==
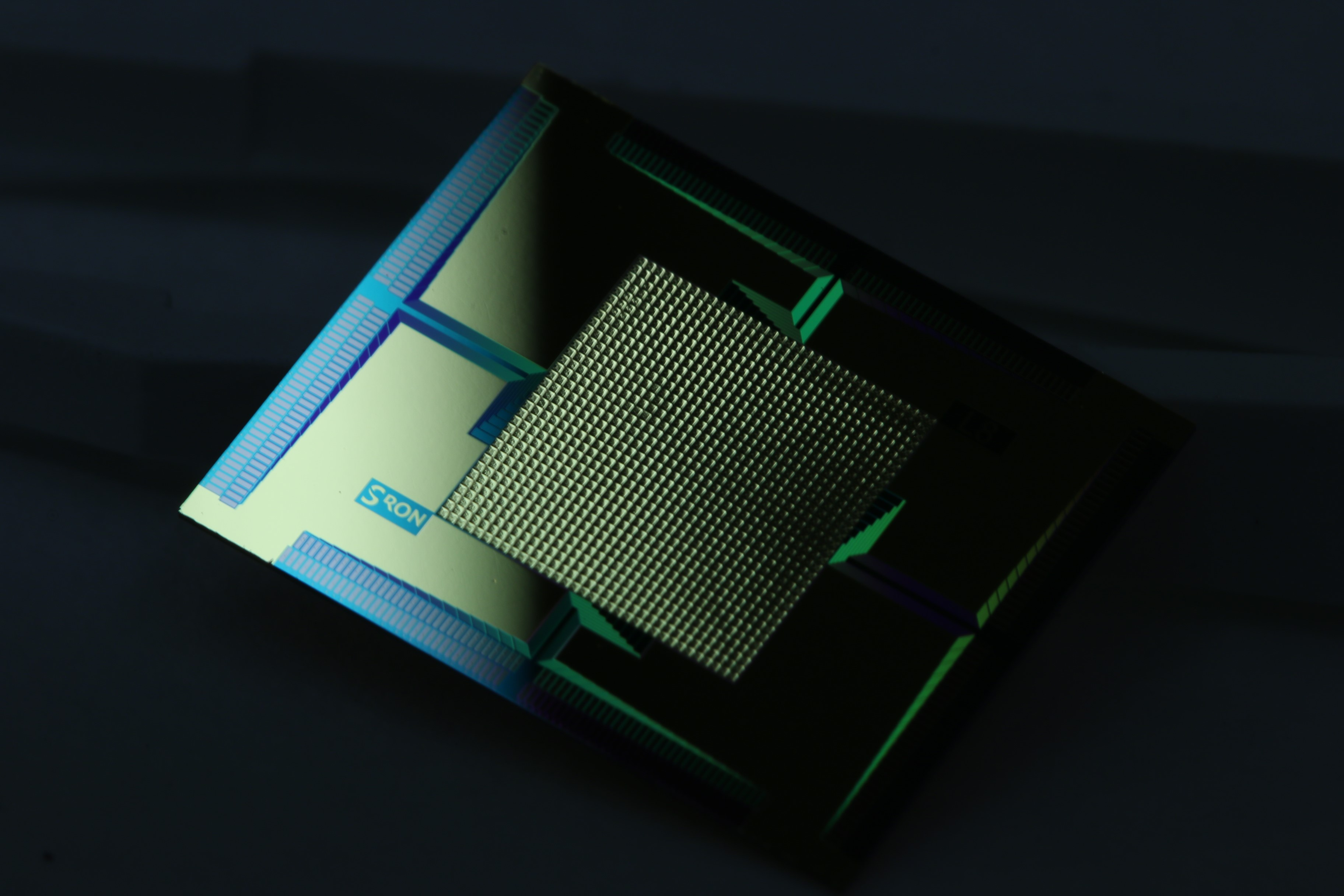
Transition Edge Sensor (TES) chip developed by SRON to detect X-rays from space. Credit: Kenichiro Nagayoshi (SRON)

SRON develops new technologies to detect radiation from space, including X-rays, infrared radiation and optical light.

For X-ray missions such as Athena, SRON scientists develop Transition Edge Sensors (TES). These work at the exact temperature at which their material is on the verge of a superconducting state. When an X-ray photon falls in from space, the material heats up a tiny bit and the superconducting state collapses. The readout current drops as a result, and the instrument knows that it has detected a photon. The energy of the photon is proportional to how much superconductivity is lost.

For infrared and exoplanet missions, Kinetic Inductance Detectors (KID) are developed at SRON. These also work at superconducting temperatures. Kinetic inductance is the manifestation of inertia in mobile charge carriers. In an alternating current the direction of a current keeps changing, which takes effort, just like it costs some effort to shake a mass back and forth. In a superconducting state this effort doesn't apply because electrons have formed pairs and therefore flow without any resistance through the material. When a photon hits from space, it breaks up several electron pairs, hampering the superconducting state and the kinetic inductance increases. This is measured by the instrument and it knows that it has detected a photon. The energy of the photon is proportional to the amount of electron pairs are broken up.

Other infrared missions such as GUSTO make use of Hot Electron Bolometer (HEB) technology.

== National and international partners ==
SRON's participates in international missions from the European Space Agency, NASA and JAXA.

== Directors ==
- Johan Bleeker (1985–2003)
- Karel Wakker (2003–2009)
- Roel Gathier (2009–2010) (interim)
- Rens Waters (2010–2019)
- Michael Wise (2019–...)

== See also ==
- List of space telescopes
