= ARRAKIHS =

Planned European Space Agency mission

- Mission type: Astrophysics (Galaxy formation and assembly, Low-surface-Brightness astronomy)
- Operator: ESA
- Website: https://www.arrakihs-mission.eu/
- Mission duration: 3 years (nominal)

Spacecraft properties
- Manufacturer: Satlantis (Instrument) AVS and Redwire (platform primes to PDR)
- Landing mass: 600 kg
- Payload mass: 160 kg
- Dimensions: ~1.5 x 1.5 x 1.2 m^3 (stowed)

Start of mission
- Launch date: December 2030

Main telescope
- Type: Two binocular telescopes (Maksutov-Cassegrain configuration) with 2 x iSIM170 camera
- Focal length: 1500 mm (f/10)
- Wavelengths: 280-900 nm visible; 900-1600 nm near infrared
- Provisional ESA insignia Cosmic Vision (Science Programme)

ARRAKIHS (Analysis of Resolved Remnants of Accreted galaxies as a Key Instrument for Halo Surveys) is an F-class space mission of the European Space Agency (ESA), selected as the second Fast mission (F2) within the Cosmic Vision programme. The mission aims to test the Λ-Cold Dark Matter (ΛCDM) model by analysing discrepancies between theoretical predictions and observations of small-scale structures, such as tidal stellar streams and dwarf satellite galaxies. It is specifically designed to explore the low-surface-brightness Universe, targeting the faintest and most diffuse structures in galaxies across a statistical sample of nearby Milky Way-like galaxies.

With a projected launch in 2030, the mission is led by Spain, with important contributions from Switzerland, Belgium, Austria, Sweden, Norway, Portugal, and the United Kingdom. It is named after the planet Arrakis from science fiction novel Dune. The name is a backronym of "Analysis of Resolved Remnants of Accreted galaxies as a Key Instrument for Halo Surveys".

== Science ==
The faint structures targeted by the mission include the diffuse stellar halo surrounding a galaxy, tidal stellar streams and shells, and other very low-brightness features, all of them difficult to detect with conventional astronomical surveys. Together, these faint galaxy components preserve evidence of past accretion and merger events, providing a fossil record of galaxy assembly. As such, they provide valuable constraints on galaxy assembly and formation processes, as well as on the role of dark matter in shaping galactic halos, linking the observable properties of galaxies to their underlying gravitational structure.

ARRAKIHS will investigate how galaxies assemble and how dark matter and baryonic processes shape their outskirts through deep visible and near-infrared observations of a statistically representative sample of nearby Milky Way-mass galaxies. By combining unprecedented depth with homogeneous observations across a large sample, the mission will move beyond studies of individual systems and enable population-level investigations of galaxy assembly. The ARRAKIHS design and survey strategy is optimized to achieve unprecedented sensitivity to faint diffuse emission while minimizing systematic observational effects.

By reaching surface-brightness limits beyond those achieved by existing wide-field surveys, ARRAKIHS will reveal and characterise faint structures that until now have been studied in detail in a small number of nearby galaxies. By extending such studies beyond our Local Group, the mission will place these galaxies in a broader galactic context, helping to constrain the mass assembly history of Milky Way-like galaxies, improve our understanding of galaxy formation processes, and investigate how stellar streams can be used to probe the properties of dark matter halos.

== Instruments ==
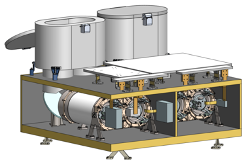
ARRAKIHS payload design

The ARRAKIHS mission's primary payload is a dual binocular telescope system with a modified Maksutov Cassegrain design equipped with two visible-wavelength and two infrared cameras, optimized for low surface brightness astronomy. Developed by the Spanish aerospace company Satlantis, the prime contractor for the instrument's design and manufacturing, the system is designed to detect extremely faint stellar structures surrounding galaxies with high sensitivity and precision. The spacecraft's wide-field imaging system has continuous wavelength coverage from 280 to 1600 nm across four photometric bands (VIS1 and VIS2 in the visible, and NIR1 and NIR2 in the near-infrared).

The binocular telescope system features:

- Telescope & Camera Module: Includes opto-mechanical assemblies, straylight baffles, instrument structure, focal plane assemblies with Visible CMOS sensors and H2RG detectors, and passive/active thermal control. Also includes the Straylight Baffle Assembly that rejects light outside the field of view such as bright stars and earth shine.
- Electronics Box: Houses control and data processing units, thermal regulation systems, and power distribution.

Filters:

- VIS filters, operating at visible wavelengths (VIS1: 280-420 nm, VIS2: 381-863 nm), 2x Te2v CIS304 detectors.
- NIR filters, operating at near-infrared wavelengths (NIR1: 857-1255 nm, NIR2: 1168-1567 nm), 2x Teledyne H2RG detectors.

== Spacecraft ==
The telescope will be integrated into a small satellite platform with a total mass of approximately 600 kg. Operating in a sun-synchronous low Earth orbit (LEO) at an altitude of 800 km, for which the spacecraft is designed with specialized baffling and thermal control systems to minimize stray light and thermal noise, ensuring stable observational conditions.

== Mission consortium ==
The ARRAKIHS Mission Consortium (AMC) is a collaborative network of scientists, engineers, and technical experts from leading research institutes and companies across Europe and beyond. It includes members from Spain, Austria, Belgium, Sweden, Switzerland, Norway, Portugal, and the United Kingdom, which are collectively responsible for funding, designing, and operating the mission's scientific and instrumental components. The consortium also collaborates with research institutions from the Netherlands, France, Denmark, the United States, Thailand, and Taiwan. The Spanish company Satlantis serves as the prime contractor for the instrument, leading a group of technological firms across Europe. The AMC is organized into three key operational area: Instrumentation, Science, and the Instrument and Science Data Operations Center (IOSDC), each of which is structured into specialized work packages.

== Timeline ==
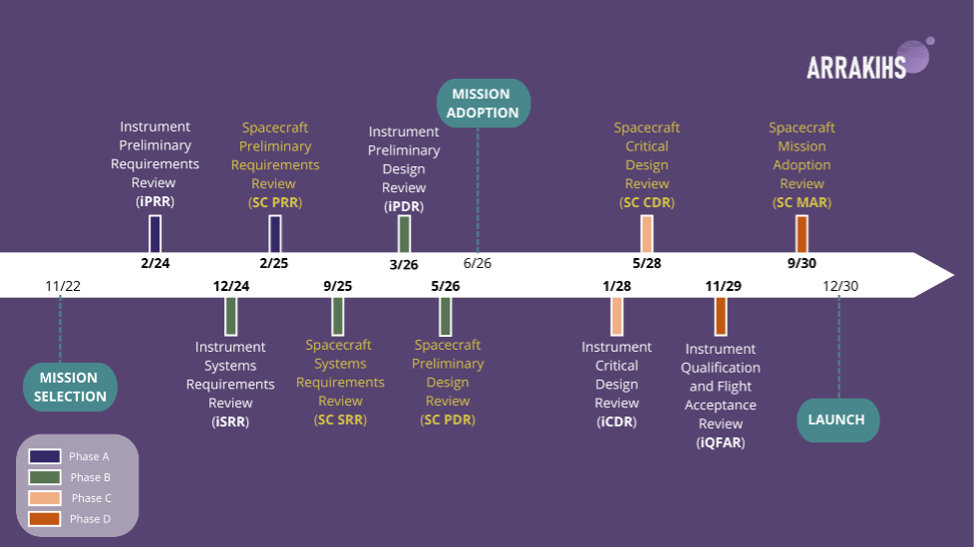
ARRAKIHS roadmap

ARRAKIHS is the second F-class mission of the European Space Agency (ESA) within its Cosmic Vision campaign. It was selected on 2 November 2022. In November 2023, The ARRAKIHS consortium has successfully passed the mission definition review of the project.

In March 2024, the mission completed its Instrument Preliminary Requirements Review (iPRR), concluding Phase A of development and ESA published a call for the definition, development, and operation of the mission.

In January 2025, the spanish company Added Value Solutions (AVS) and a Belgian subsidiary of Redwire have won contracts for the initial phases of the project. The contracts include preliminary spacecraft design and work to derisk key technologies. In May 2025, the scientific preparation phase of ARRAKIHS, using a terrestrial demonstrator of the iSIM-170 camera, has officially begun at the Astrophysical Observatory of Javalambre in Spain.

The mission has completed its design phase and achieved adoption in June 2026 with launch planned by the end of 2030.

== See also ==
- ARRAKIHS official website (with more detailed information on all the aspects of the mission)
- Astrophysical Observatory of Javalambre (hosting the ARRAKIHS on-ground demonstrator)
- Centro de Estudios de Fisica del Cosmos de Aragon (CEFCA; leading the ARRAKIHS data reduction pipeline)
- Institute of Space Sciences (ICE-CSIC) (leading the instrumentation segment of the consortium).
- IFCA (leading the ARRAKIHS Mission Consortium).
- List of European Space Agency programmes and missions
