= THESEUS =

European Space Agency telescope

Transient High-Energy Sky and Early Universe Surveyor
- Mission type: Space observatory
- Operator: European Space Agency

Spacecraft properties
- Power: 115 W

Start of mission
- Launch date: 2037 (proposed)
- Rocket: Vega-E (baseline)

Orbital parameters
- Regime: Low Earth orbit
- Altitude: 600 km
- Inclination: 5° (equatorial)

Main telescope
- Diameter: Infrared: 70 cm; Cassegrain type
- Wavelengths: Infrared, Gamma-rays and X-rays

Transient High-Energy Sky and Early Universe Surveyor (THESEUS) is a space telescope mission proposal by the European Space Agency that would study gamma-ray bursts and X-rays for investigating the early universe. If developed, the mission would investigate star formation rates and metallicity evolution, as well as studying the sources and physics of reionization.

== Overview ==
THESEUS is a mission concept that would monitor transient events in the high-energy Universe across the whole sky and over the entirety of cosmic history. In particular, it expects to make a complete census of gamma-ray bursts (GRBs) from the Universe's first billion years, to help understand the life cycle of the first stars. THESEUS would provide real-time triggers and accurate locations of the sources, which could also be followed up by other space- or ground-based telescopes operating at complementary wavelengths.

The space observatory would study GRBs and X-rays and their association with the explosive death of massive stars, supernova shock break-outs, black hole tidal disruption events, and magnetar flares. This can provide fundamental information on the cosmic star formation rate, the number density and properties of low-mass galaxies, the neutral hydrogen fraction, and the escape fraction of ultraviolet photons from galaxies.

== Project history ==
The concept was selected in May 2018 as a finalist to become the fifth Medium-class mission (M5) of the Cosmic Vision programme by the European Space Agency (ESA). The other finalist was EnVision, a Venus orbiter. The winner, EnVision, was selected in June 2021 for launch in 2031.

In November 2023, following a new selection process (2022) and a Phase-0 study (2023), THESEUS was selected by ESA for a new 2.5 year Phase-A study as one of the three candidates M7 missions under the new Voyage 2050 framework (together with M-Matisse and Plasma Observatory).

== Scientific payload ==
The conceptual payload of THESEUS includes:

- Soft X-ray Imager (SXI), sensitive to 0.3-6 keV is a set of 2 lobster-eye telescope units, covering a total field of view (FOV) of 1 sr with source location accuracy <1-2 arcmin.
- InfraRed Telescope (IRT), sensitive to 0.7-1.8 μm is a 0.7 m NIR telescope with 15x15 arcmin FOV, for fast response, with both imaging and moderate spectroscopic capabilities (R~400). Mass: 112.6 kg.
- X-Gamma ray Imaging Spectrometer (XGIS), sensitive to 2 keV-20 MeV, is a set of 2 coded-mask cameras using monolithic X-gamma ray detectors based on bars of silicon diodes coupled with CsI crystal scintillator, granting a 1.5 sr FOV, a source location accuracy of 5 arcmin in 2-30 keV and an unprecedentedly broad energy band. Mass: 37.3 kg.

== See also ==
- Gamma-ray astronomy
- List of proposed space observatories
- X-ray astronomy
- List of European Space Agency programmes and missions
