= Arcos de las Salinas =

- municipality
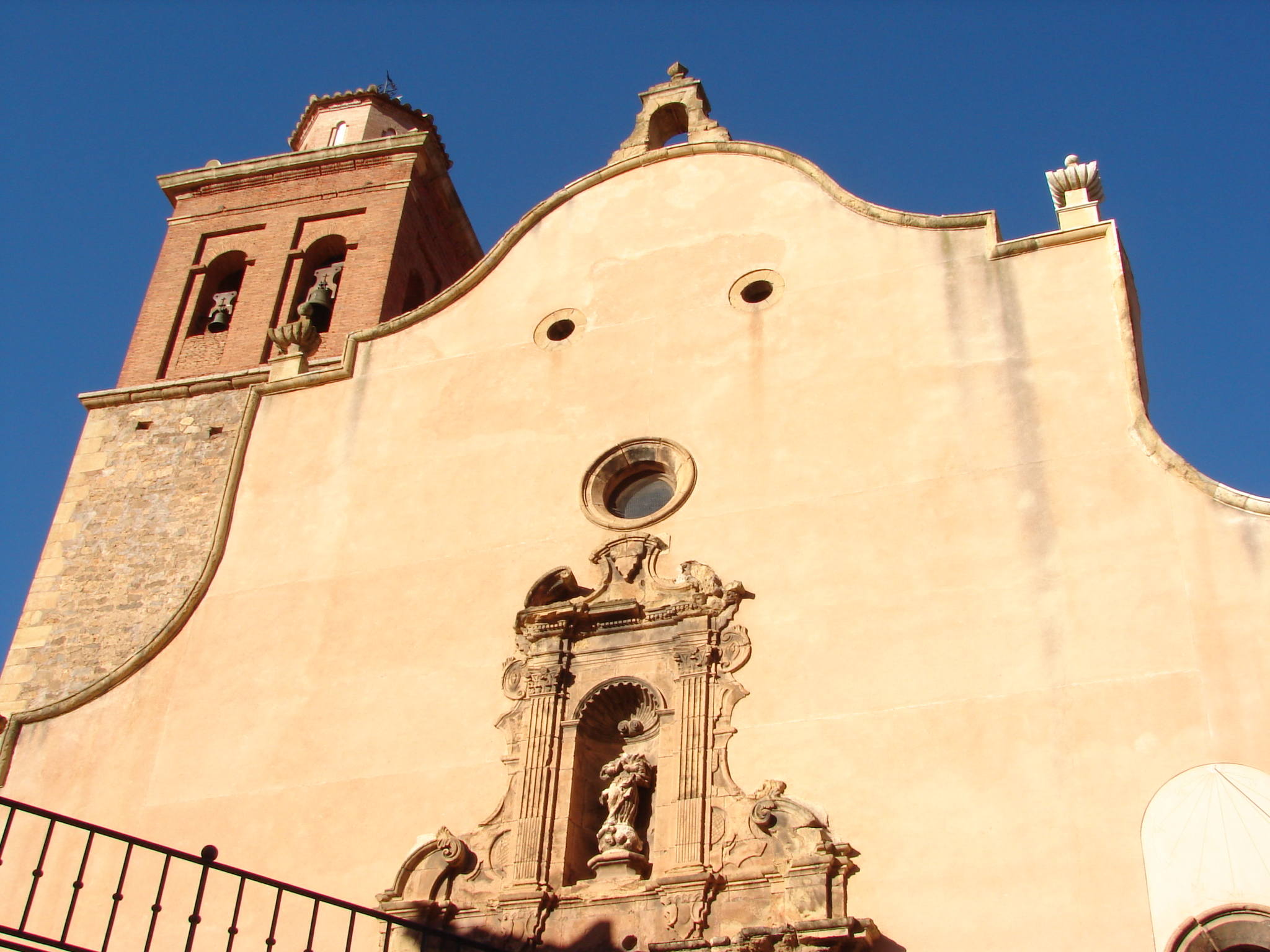

- Flag Coat of arms

- Location within Spain
- Coordinates: 39°59′N 1°2′W
- Country: Spain
- Autonomous community: Aragon
- Province: Teruel

Area
  - Total: 112.99 km^{2} (43.63 sq mi)
- Elevation: 1,081 m (3,547 ft)

Population (2025-01-01)
  - Total: 105
  - Density: 0.929/km^{2} (2.41/sq mi)
- Time zone: UTC+1 (CET)
  - Summer (DST): UTC+2 (CEST)

Arcos de las Salinas is a municipality located in the province of Teruel, Aragon, Spain. According to the 2018 census (INE), the municipality had a population of 105 inhabitants.

== See also ==
- List of municipalities in Teruel
