= Labordeta =

Labordeta is a Spanish surname. Notable people with the surname include:

- Ángela Labordeta (born 1967), Spanish writer and journalist
- José Antonio Labordeta (1935–2010), Spanish singer-songwriter and politician
- Miguel Labordeta (1921–1969), Spanish poet
