= Our Lovers =

- Theatrical release poster
- Spanish: Nuestros amantes
- Directed by: Miguel Ángel Lamata
- Screenplay by: Miguel Ángel Lamata
- Produced by: Vanessa Montfort; José Pastor; Miguel Ángel Lamata
- Starring: Eduardo Noriega; Michelle Jenner; Fele Martínez; Amaia Salamanca; Gabino Diego
- Cinematography: Fran Fernández Pardo
- Edited by: Nacho Blasco
- Music by: Roque Baños
- Production companies: Bemybaby Films; La Ferme! Productions
- Distributed by: Filmax
- Release dates: 30 April 2016 (Málaga); 3 June 2016 (Spain)
- Countries: Spain; France
- Language: Spanish

Our Lovers (Spanish: Nuestros amantes) is a 2016 Spanish-French romantic comedy film written and directed by Miguel Ángel Lamata. It stars Eduardo Noriega, Michelle Jenner, Fele Martínez, Amaia Salamanca, and Gabino Diego.

The plot explores the relationship between frustrated writer Carlos and dreamer Irene upon their meeting in a café, as they begin to flirt even though they set as a rule to forbid themselves to fall in love with each other.

The Spanish film has English subtitles.

== Plot ==
Carlos, a successful but frustrated screenwriter in Zaragoza, Spain, is coping with romantic and professional disappointments. His wife of 8 years, Maria, has asked for a 2-month separation “to think things over.” He aspires to write a serious dramatic play, Bukowski and Capote in Hell, but is stuck with writer’s block. Instead, he writes the silly low-brow―but popular―animated comedy movies “Mema y Lerda” (Ditzy and Bozo) that Carlos and his partner, Cristobal, are serializing.

In a bookstore coffee shop, Carlos meets Irene, who sits down at his table and proposes an intriguing game that he cannot resist: two strangers set aside meaningless conventions and pretensions, behaving the guileless way children do when first meeting at a park. Children spontaneously agree to play together for a time without “burdensome details,” preconceptions, or expectations to see where the friendship might lead. Irene's only pre-condition: do not fall in love. Carlos deems Irene a beautiful prototypical “manic pixie dream girl.”

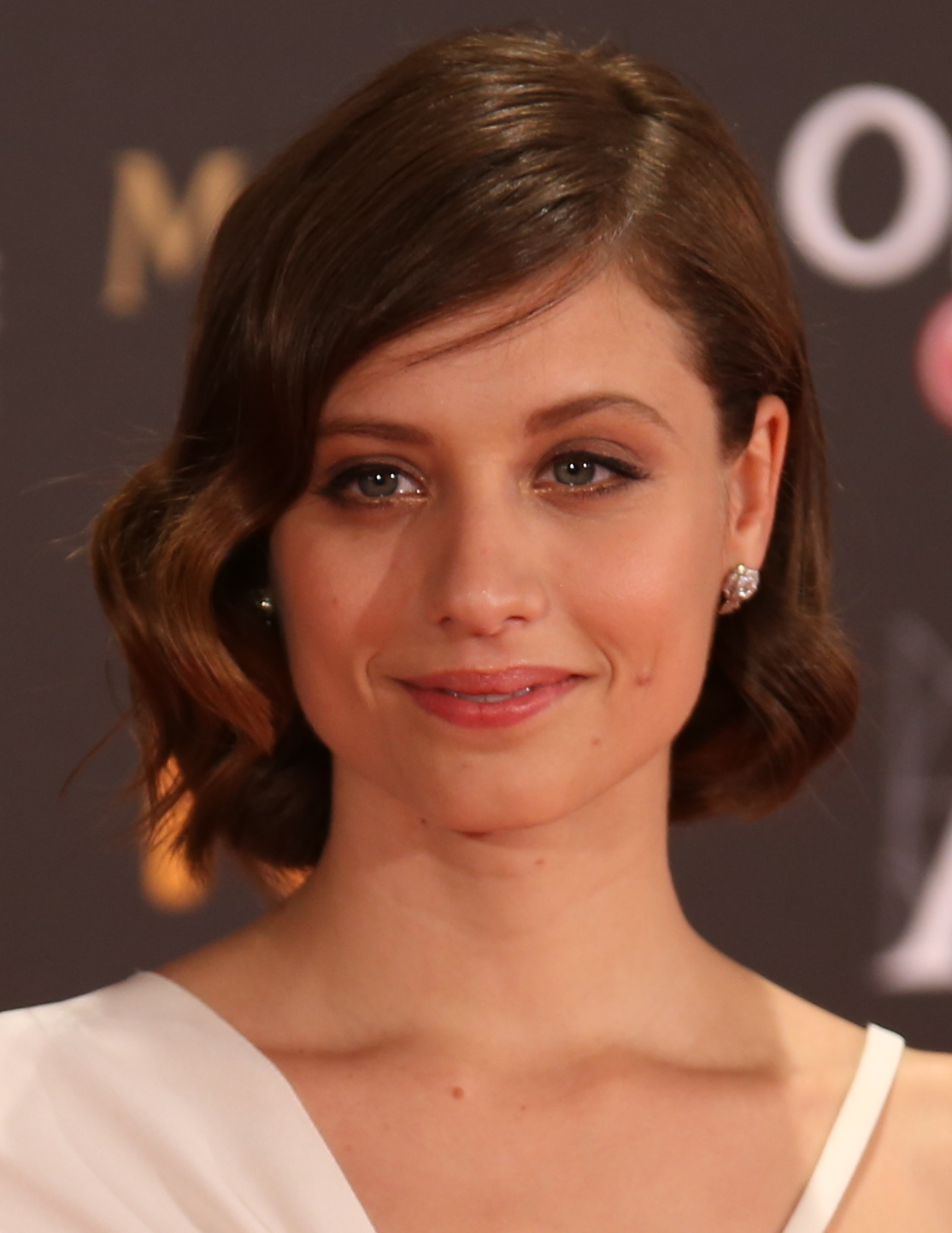
Michelle Jenner plays Irene, dumped by Jorge, who proposes an intriguing game to Carlos that he cannot resist, though he knows of complications of which Irene is unaware.

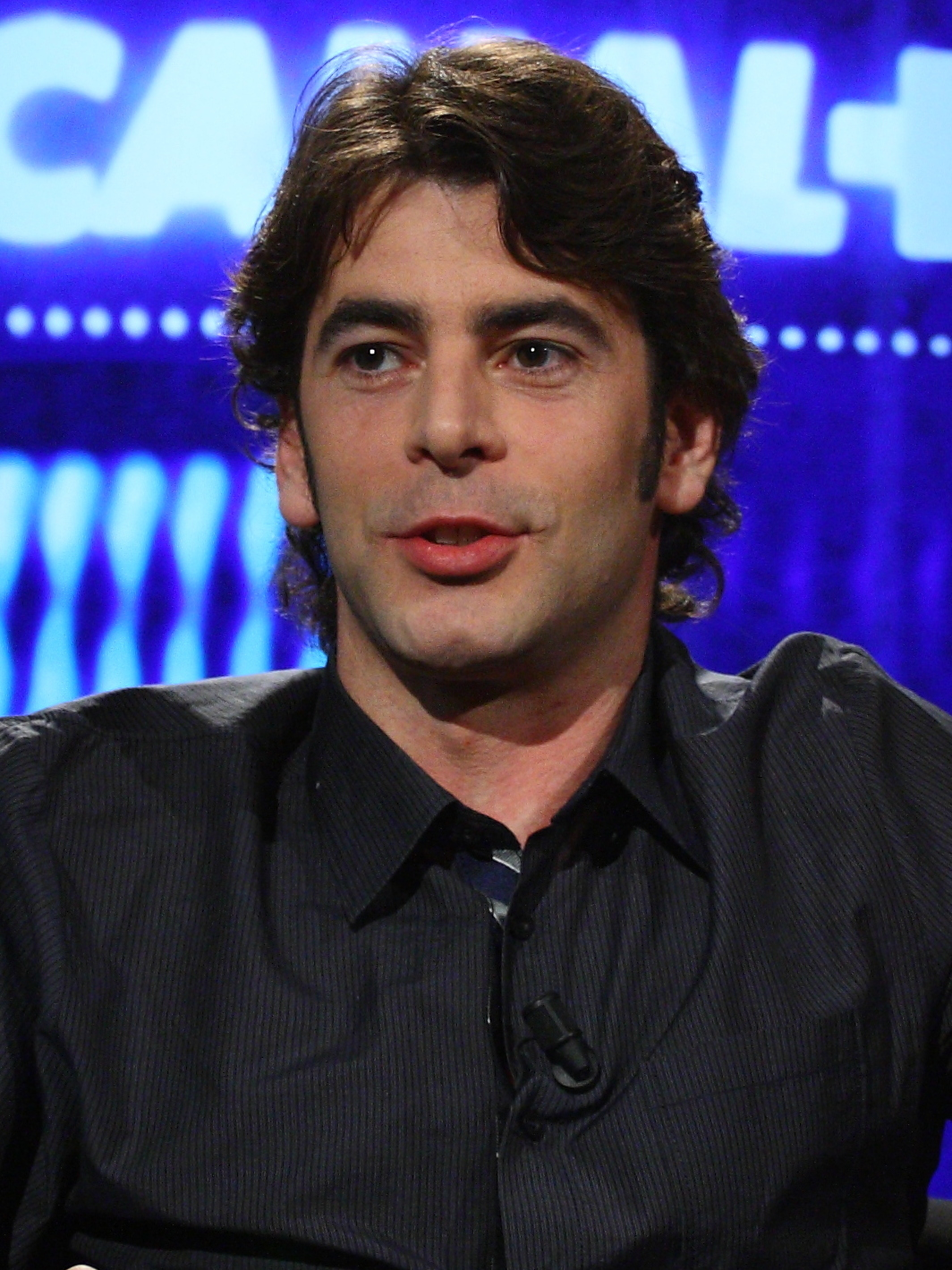
Eduardo Noriega plays Carlos, who is intrigued by Irene, but has to break it to her that her ex-boyfriend, Jorge, is involved with his separated wife, María.

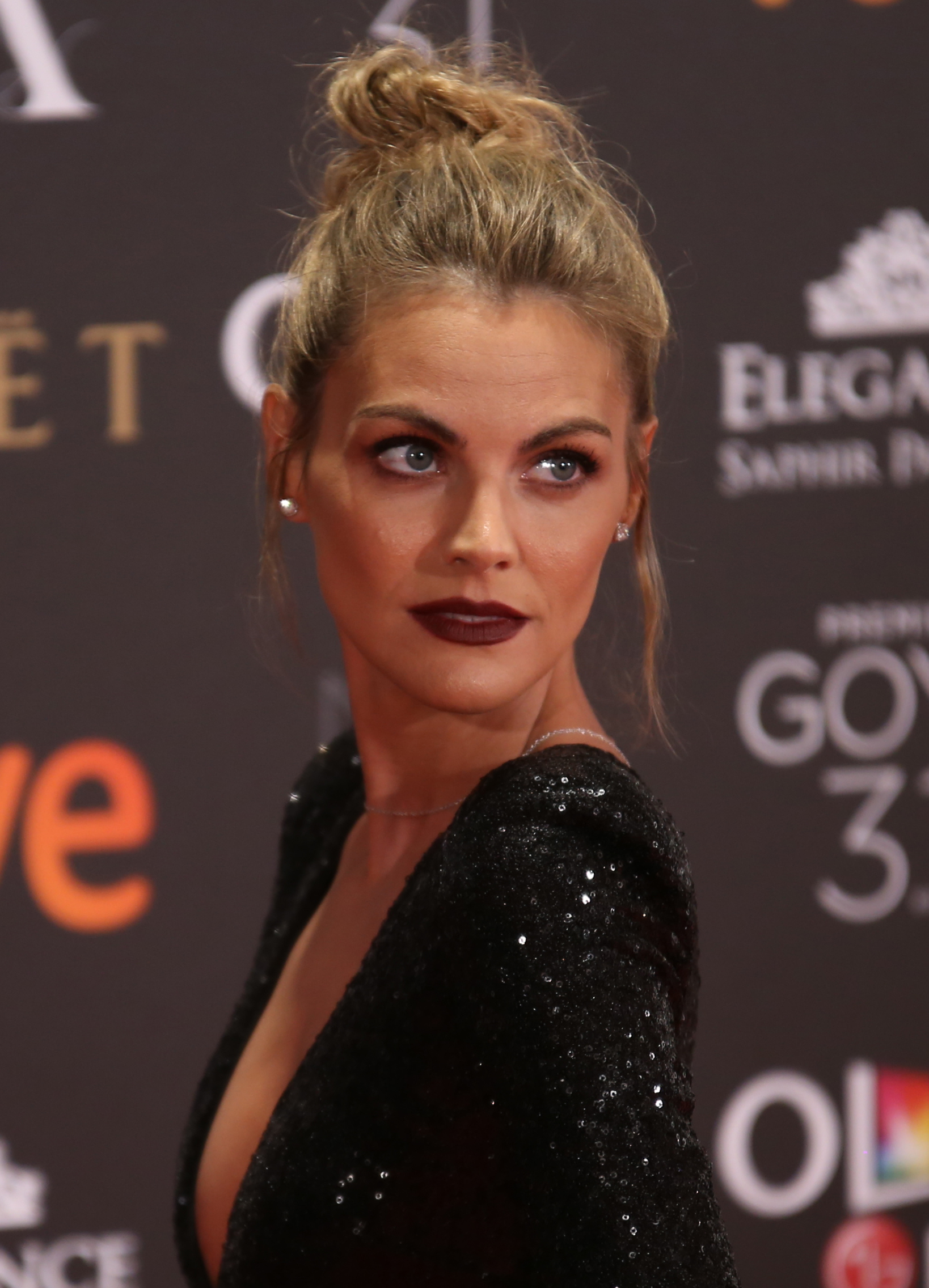
Amaia Salamanca plays María, Carlos’s wife who has requested a 2-month separation to explore her options with Jorge.

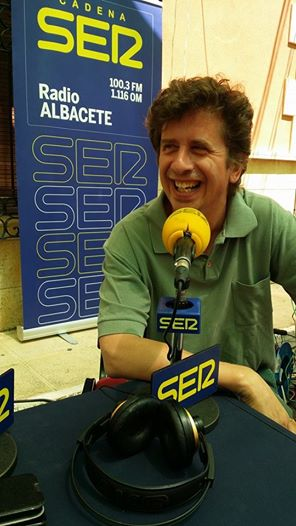
Gabino Diego plays Jorge, a poet who has inspired Maria to try sex practices that Carlos never dared to suggest.

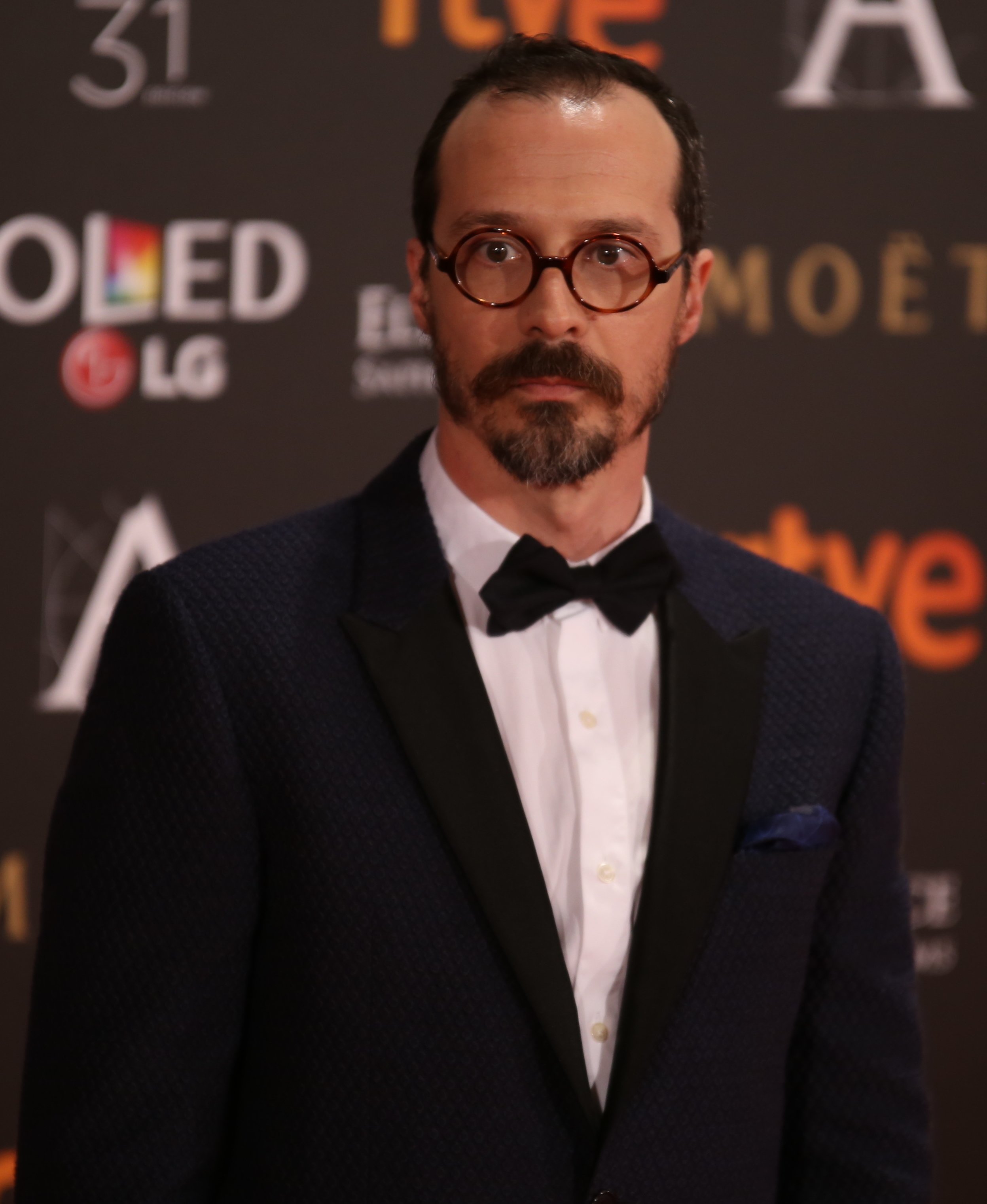
Fele Martínez plays Cristóbal, Carlos’s writing partner who breaks additional bad news to Carlos about María’s past indiscretions.

Carlos doesn't immediately share with Irene his true reason for accepting her invitation to get to know each other “unburdened by expectations.” He has recently discovered that his wife, Maria, is having an affair with Jorge, Irene’s poet former boyfriend of two years. A few weeks into Maria’s proposed two-month separation, a suspicious Carlos trailed her, discovering Maria’s affair with Jorge. Later, Carlos followed Jorge undetected to a bookstore café, witnessing Jorge’s breakup with Irene and her resulting devastation. At this same bookstore, a few days later—unaware of Carlos’s connection to Jorge’s lover—Irene had approached Carlos with the “fresh start” proposition. Intrigued, Carlos doesn't immediately disclose to Irene the complication in their “unburdened” relationship.

They arrange a meeting in a week's time. At a museum and park, in a series of conversations and situations―still without knowing each other’s names―Carlos and Irene exchange favorite authors, literary aspirations, philosophies of life and love, and past bad relationships. When Carlos eventually reveals to Irene their Jorge-Maria connection, they discuss what failings in their respective characters made each obsessed by a narcissist. Carlos cynically posits that partners leave to find someone better. If they return, it is generally because they failed to find anyone better, not because of gained insight or appreciation.

Drawn to each other, Carlos and Irene have sex, still without knowing each other’s names. Afterwards, they return to the bookstore café, where Maria and Jorge encounter them, each calling out in astonishment the name of Carlos or Irene, thus affecting a spontaneous introduction. As a result of their conversational insights, Irene and Carlos now are better able to deal with the manipulations of their narcissists as each couple discusses what caused the failure of their relationship.

Carlos and Maria agree to attempt a reconciliation for the sake of their five-year-old daughter, Laura. Jorge finds Irene less complacent; he has cheated on her once before and they are now over for good. To Carlos, Irene expresses that she understands he cannot easily break off his marriage for his daughter’s sake. They both agree that they have shared unforgettable moments together.

While packing up his things at Cristobal’s house, where he has been staying during his separation, Carlos discusses his reasons for accepting Maria back. Cristobal discloses that prior to the trial separation, Maria seduced him when Carlos was out of town on business. Carlos realizes that Maria will never change.

Two weeks later, Irene sits alone at a table at the bookstore cafe. Having paid the waiter to tip him off when she next appeared, Carlos appears and joins her. When Irene teases him, saying she is waiting for Jorge, Carlos asks incredulously if she is back with Jorge for a third time. Irene reveals that she has not seen Jorge since the night they all met but points out that it only took Maria three minutes to win Carlos back. Carlos informs her that he did not reconcile with Maria. He has also resumed work on his Bukowski-Capote play. They declare their love for each other and agree to continue to get to know each other better.

== Cast ==
- Eduardo Noriega as Carlos
- Michelle Jenner as Irene
- Fele Martínez as Cristóbal
- Amaia Salamanca as María
- Gabino Diego as Jorge

== Production ==
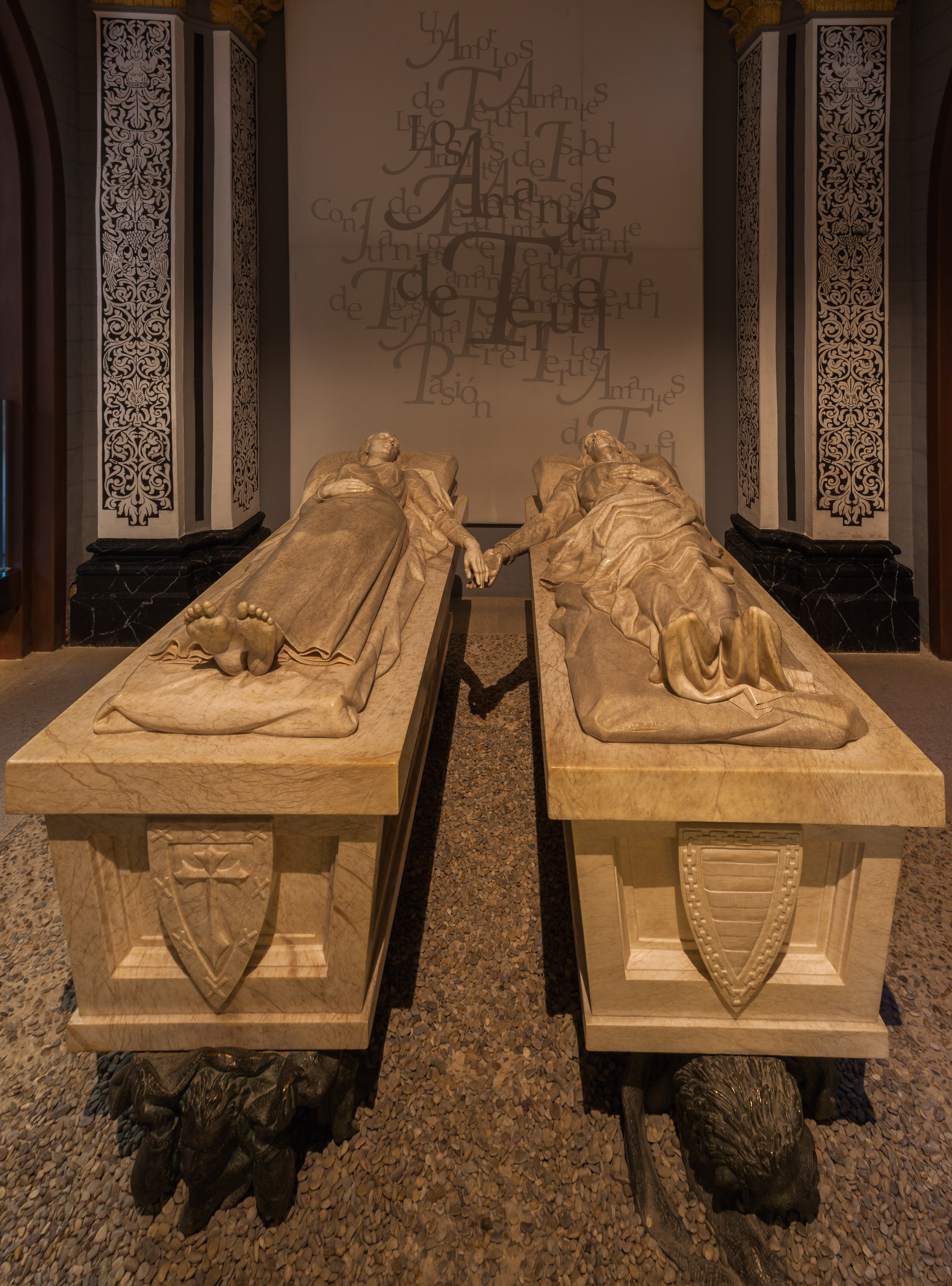
The legendary Lovers of Teruel, depicted in a monument in that city, are cited in the film.

The film was produced by Bemybaby Films alongside La Ferme! Productions. Shooting locations in Aragon included Zaragoza, Teruel, and Boltaña.

== Release ==
The film premiered as the closing film of the 19th Málaga Film Festival on 30 April 2016. Distributed by Filmax, it was released theatrically in Spain on 3 June 2016.

== Reception ==
On the review aggregator website Rotten Tomatoes, 20% of 5 critics' reviews are positive, with an average rating of 3.7/10.

Javier Ocaña of El País wrote that "most of the dialogues, which could be daring, are just blushing".

Beatriz Martínez of Fotogramas rated the film 2 out of 5 stars, singling out Jenner and her natural charm as the best thing about the film, while citing the "dialogues bordering on the ridiculous" as the film's worst.

Sergio F. Pinilla of Cinemanía rated the film 1½ out of 5 stars, describing it as a rom-com with dialogues "that break the whole".

== See also ==
- List of Spanish films of 2016
