= Violeta Gil =

Violeta Gil Casado, known as Violeta Gil (Hoyuelos, 1983), is a Spanish writer, philologist, performance creator and translator.

== Early life and education ==
Born in Hoyuelos, a small town in Segovia, Gil moved to Madrid in 2002 to study at university.

She has a degree in English Philology from the Complutense University of Madrid and in Interpretation from the Royal School of Dramatic Art.

In 2015, she obtained a scholarship from the University of Iowa to study a master's degree in Creative Writing, until 2017. Together with the students in the MFA in Spanish Creative Writing and the MFA in Literary Translation, she created a series of performative readings in Spanish with subtitles in English, called Subtitulados.

== Career ==
In 2005, together with Celso Giménez and Itsaso Arana, she founded the theater company La tristura, which was company-in-residence at Teatros del Canal from 2017 to 2020. As part of the company, she writes, directs, produces and distributes works that have toured stages such as those of the Autumn Festival of the Region of Madrid, the Thèâtre de la Ville in Paris, the TEMPO Festival in Rio de Janeiro, Contemporary dinner in Brasilia or the Kampnagel Summer International Festival in Hamburg, among others. She has also made solo pieces in places such as La Casa Encendida or La Cárcel de Segovia Centro de Creación (2015).

Gil teaches theater and writing workshops in institutions such as La Casa Encendida, La Escuela de Escritores, Matadero Madrid, or the Centro de Cultura Contemporánea Conde Duque. She was a resident artist in 2018 at Yaddo (Saratoga Springs), in 2019 at the Headlands Center for the Arts (Sausalito), in 2021 at Matadero Madrid with the performative poetry project Una fiesta salvaje and in 2021, in Etopia Centro de Arte y Tecnología (Zaragoza). She collaborated as a playwright and translator for international programs with dance companies La Veronal (2018 and 2019) and Mucha Muchacha.

In 2019, the publishing company Arrebato published her first book of poems, Antes de que tiréis mis cosas. With this book, she toured for three years with a performance of the same name alongside musician Abraham Boba of León Benavente, blending music, dance, and theater.

In October 2022, Caballo de Troya publishing house, an imprint of Penguin Random House Grupo Editorial, edited by Jonás Trueba, published her first novel, Llego con tres heridas [I Come With Three Wounds], in which she tells the story of a daughter who says goodbye to the father she barely knew, and whose story was hidden from her. It is an autofiction novel, which, as she herself has said, contains many sections related to her autobiography, in which she tells the story of her father and her grandfather, extended to the history of Spain. The title is reminiscent of the poem "Llegó con tres heridas" by Miguel Hernández, with which Gil feels connected due to the themes of love, death, and life, to which she alludes in her book. The work was created as a novel and as a performance during her stay at the Etopia laboratory in Zaragoza, where she was invited to participate in the Author Residencies program. The filmmakers Elena López Rivera and Víctor Iriarte collaborated in the performance. This novel won the Castilla y León Critics' Prize in 2023.

With the poet Carlos Bueno, Gil has translated Book of Mutter, by Kate Zambreno, into Spanish for the publishing house La uña rota.

An English translation by Kelsi Vanada of the first chapter of Gil's Llego con tres heridas [I Come With Three Wounds] was published in the literary journal The Los Angeles Review.

== Works ==
- 2019 - Antes de que tiréis mis cosas. Poetry. Arrebato Libros. ISBN 978-84-120157-0-6
- 2022 - Llego con tres heridas. Novel. Caballo de Troya. ISBN 978-84-17417-54-3
