= Vanessa Montfort =

Spanish novelist and playwright (born 1975)

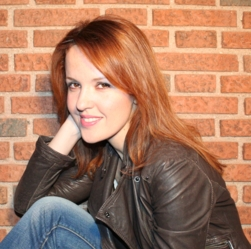
- Born: 1975 (age 50–51); Barcelona, Spain
- Occupations: Novelist; playwright; theatre director; film producer
- Writing career
- Language: Spanish
- Genres: Novel; historical fiction; drama
- Notable works: Mujeres que compran flores; Firmado Lejárraga; La mujer sin nombre; La Toffana

Vanessa Montfort (born 1975) is a Spanish novelist and playwright. Born in Barcelona and resident in Madrid, she is the author of stage texts and of novels including Mitología de Nueva York (2010), which won the Premio de Novela Ateneo de Sevilla; Mujeres que compran flores (2016), her most widely read book and the basis of a forthcoming film adaptation; and La mujer sin nombre (2020), which recovers the figure of the writer María Lejárraga. In February 2025 she won the Premio Primavera de Novela with La Toffana, a judicial thriller set in seventeenth-century Rome.

== Early life and education ==
Montfort has said that she wrote her first story at the age of five, inspired by childhood trips to New York, where her father lived, and that her parents, who were keen theatregoers, took her to the theatre from an early age. She chose to study journalism as a way of approaching theatre and literature through the cultural press, and before devoting herself fully to writing she worked as press officer of the Ballet Clásico de Madrid, in the communications department of the Teatro Real and as an advertising creative.

== Career ==
=== Beginnings and the Royal Court Theatre ===
Montfort began her literary career during her university years, staging Quijote Show (1999), Paisaje transportado (2003) and Estábamos destinadas a ser ángeles (2006). In 2007 she was invited to the International Residency for Emerging Playwrights of the Royal Court Theatre in London, returning in 2008 for the Spanish Voices programme; there she worked with directors such as Lindsey Turner and Fiona Laird and took part in workshops with Harold Pinter, Tom Stoppard, Martin Crimp and David Hare. The residencies produced English translations of Flashback (Royal Court Theatre, 2007), La mejor posibilidad de ser Alex Quantz (Southwark Playhouse, 2008) and La cortesía de los ciegos, whose radio version was broadcast by Radio Nacional de España in 2012. In 2012 she wrote, with Marina Bollaín, the first stage version of Clarín's novel La Regenta for the Teatros del Canal, and in 2013 she wrote and directed the musical monologue Sirena negra and received two international commissions, Chalk Land for the Royal Court Theatre and Balboa for the National Theatre of Panama.

=== First novels ===
Her first novel, El ingrediente secreto, won the eleventh Premio de Novela Ateneo Joven de Sevilla in 2006. Four years later she won the senior Premio de Novela Ateneo de Sevilla, sponsored by Ámbito Cultural of El Corte Inglés, with Mitología de Nueva York; both books were published by Algaida Editores, and Montfort received the two statuettes at the Ateneo de Sevilla, where she described the city and the institution as her literary talisman.

=== Historical fiction and commercial success ===
La leyenda de la isla sin voz (Plaza & Janés, 2014), a historical fable set on Blackwell's Island in nineteenth-century New York with Charles Dickens among its protagonists, won the eleventh Premio Internacional de Novela Histórica Ciudad de Zaragoza in May 2015. The award, endowed with €20,000 and a bronze sculpture by the Aragonese artist José Miguel Fuertes, was decided by a jury made up of Espido Freire, Almudena de Arteaga, Jesús Maeso de la Torre, León Arsenal, Juan Bolea and the bookseller Javier Lahoz, which chose the novel from a record entry of forty-six titles published in 2014 and praised its literary quality and its reconstruction of the city.

Mujeres que compran flores (2016), built around a group of women characters, became a major commercial success; her following novel, El sueño de la crisálida (2019), deals with social media, isolation and workplace harassment through two women living at opposite extremes of contemporary life. The same year she contributed the story El coprotagonista to Hombres (y algunas mujeres), an anthology of women writers published by Zenda.

=== María Lejárraga ===
Firmado Lejárraga, a play about the writer María Lejárraga, whose works were signed by her husband Gregorio Martínez Sierra, premiered on 23 April 2019 in the Mirlo Blanco hall of the Teatro Valle-Inclán in Madrid, within the Centro Dramático Nacional cycle En Letra Grande. Directed by Miguel Ángel Lamata, with music by Fernando Velázquez, it was performed by Gerald B. Filmore, Cristina Gallego, Eduardo Noriega, Alfredo Noval and Jorge Usón.

The play was a finalist for best playwriting at the twenty-third Premios Max in 2020, alongside Pablo Remón and the brothers Josep Lluís and Rodolf Sirera; the finalists were announced on 12 May 2020 after a jury meeting held remotely, in an edition to which 386 productions had been submitted.

The project had begun as a commission from Ernesto Caballero, then director of the Centro Dramático Nacional, and its reception led Montfort to turn the material into a novel, La mujer sin nombre (Plaza & Janés, 2020), which argues that Lejárraga was the sole author of the work attributed to her husband and follows her through the Belle Époque in Paris, Madrid in the 1920s, the Spanish Civil War, occupied France and Hollywood. While researching the book Montfort established that Lejárraga's remains were not buried in the Chacarita cemetery in Buenos Aires, as had been assumed, but that her ashes had been scattered in the Río de la Plata.

For the novel Montfort travelled to New York to meet scholars who had studied Lejárraga, among them Patricia O'Connor, and traced descendants who still kept the couple's correspondence and Lejárraga's diary. On the basis of those letters she concluded that the roughly ninety works credited to Martínez Sierra had all been written by his wife, an arrangement that, in her account, began because Lejárraga's public teaching contract barred her from signing works under her own name and hardened as her husband's signature became a successful brand.

Montfort also took part, as one of the interviewees, in the documentary A las mujeres de España. María Lejárraga, directed by Laura Hojman and produced by Summer Films and RTVE, in which she appears alongside Rosa Montero, Manuela Carmena and Antonina Rodrigo. The film was nominated for best documentary feature at the 37th Goya Awards. It was one of five titles competing in the category at the ceremony held on 11 February 2023; narrated by Kiti Mánver, with Cristina Domínguez playing Lejárraga in its dramatised sections, it was made by the two-person company Summer Films and shown on Spanish public television.

=== Later work ===
In 2022 Montfort wrote and directed El síndrome del copiloto, a stage adaptation of Mujeres que compran flores produced under the Teatros del Canal's Creación Canal label, which ran from 7 to 24 April in the theatre's Sala Verde with Cuca Escribano and Miguel Ángel Muñoz and music by Fernando Velázquez. The play follows Marina, a woman who crosses the Strait of Gibraltar alone on a sailing boat in order to scatter in Tangier the ashes of the man she loved; it was produced by Avanti Teatro with Concha Busto Producciones, Teatros del Canal and 16 Escalones. The text won the llàntia for best playwriting at the seventh Premis de Teatre José Estruch, awarded by the Teatro Principal in Alicante; the jury met on 30 May 2023 and chose among forty-four productions, and the prizes were presented on 16 October. Montfort has described the "copilot syndrome" of the title as the condition of a person who becomes so used to putting someone else's life first that they confuse it with their own, and who is left without bearings if that person disappears. In the same interview she called for greater public investment in culture and research, opposed the removal of humanities subjects from the curriculum, and argued that education plans should be given time to take effect instead of depending on the priorities of each incoming government.

Also in 2022 she wrote La Toffana, a play about the trial of the seventeenth-century Roman apothecary Giulia Toffana, accused of distributing an undetectable poison among the women of the city. Directed by María Herrero and staged by the company Flexión Teatro in co-production with the Centro Dramático Galego, it had its world premiere on 13 July 2022 at the Antigua Universidad Renacentista during the Almagro International Classical Theatre Festival.

Her novel La hermandad de las malas hijas (2023) turns to the relationship between mothers and daughters, following four women of the generation that had children during the Spanish baby boom, and also addresses loneliness and sexuality in old age. Montfort, who is also a journalist, said that unlike the historical novel that preceded it she had built this book out of everyday conversation rather than research. She linked the book to the difficulty of combining work with the care of ageing parents, a burden she argued still falls mainly on daughters, and described it as a novel that also contains a mystery plot.

=== La Toffana and the Premio Primavera ===
On 28 February 2025 Montfort won the Premio Primavera de Novela, endowed with €100,000 and awarded by the publisher Espasa and Ámbito Cultural of El Corte Inglés, with La Toffana, a novel developed from the earlier play. The jury, chaired by Carme Riera and completed by Antonio Soler, Nativel Preciado, Gervasio Posadas and David Cebrián, decided unanimously at a meeting in Madrid, choosing the book from 1,221 manuscripts submitted from Spain and Latin America.

== Film production ==
In the summer of 2014 Montfort founded the production company Bemybaby Films with the director Miguel Ángel Lamata. The company released its first feature film, Nuestros amantes, in 2016, with Eduardo Noriega, Michelle Jenner, Amaia Salamanca, Gabino Diego and Fele Martínez, and in 2021 released Héroes: Silencio y Rock & Roll, a biographical film about the rock band Héroes del Silencio directed by Alexis Morante. Bemybaby Films also holds the worldwide audiovisual rights to Mujeres que compran flores.

== Works ==
=== Novels ===
- El ingrediente secreto (Algaida, 2006)
- Mitología de Nueva York (Algaida, 2010)
- La leyenda de la isla sin voz (Plaza & Janés, 2014)
- Mujeres que compran flores (Plaza & Janés, 2016)
- El sueño de la crisálida (Plaza & Janés, 2019)
- La mujer sin nombre (Plaza & Janés, 2020)
- La hermandad de las malas hijas (Plaza & Janés, 2023)
- La Toffana (Espasa, 2025)

=== Selected plays ===
- Quijote Show (1999)
- Paisaje transportado (2003)
- Estábamos destinadas a ser ángeles (2006)
- Flashback (2007)
- La mejor posibilidad de ser Alex Quantz (2008)
- La cortesía de los ciegos (2012)
- La Regenta (2012), with Marina Bollaín
- Sirena negra (2013)
- Chalk Land (2013)
- Balboa (2013)
- Firmado Lejárraga (2019)
- El síndrome del copiloto (2022)
- La Toffana (2022)
