= Modern Review =

Modern Review has been used as a name for a number of magazines:

- Modern Review (Calcutta), published from 1907 to 1995
- Modern Review (London), published from 1991 to 1995
- Modern Review (North American), published since 2005
