= Ángela Labordeta =

Spanish writer and journalist

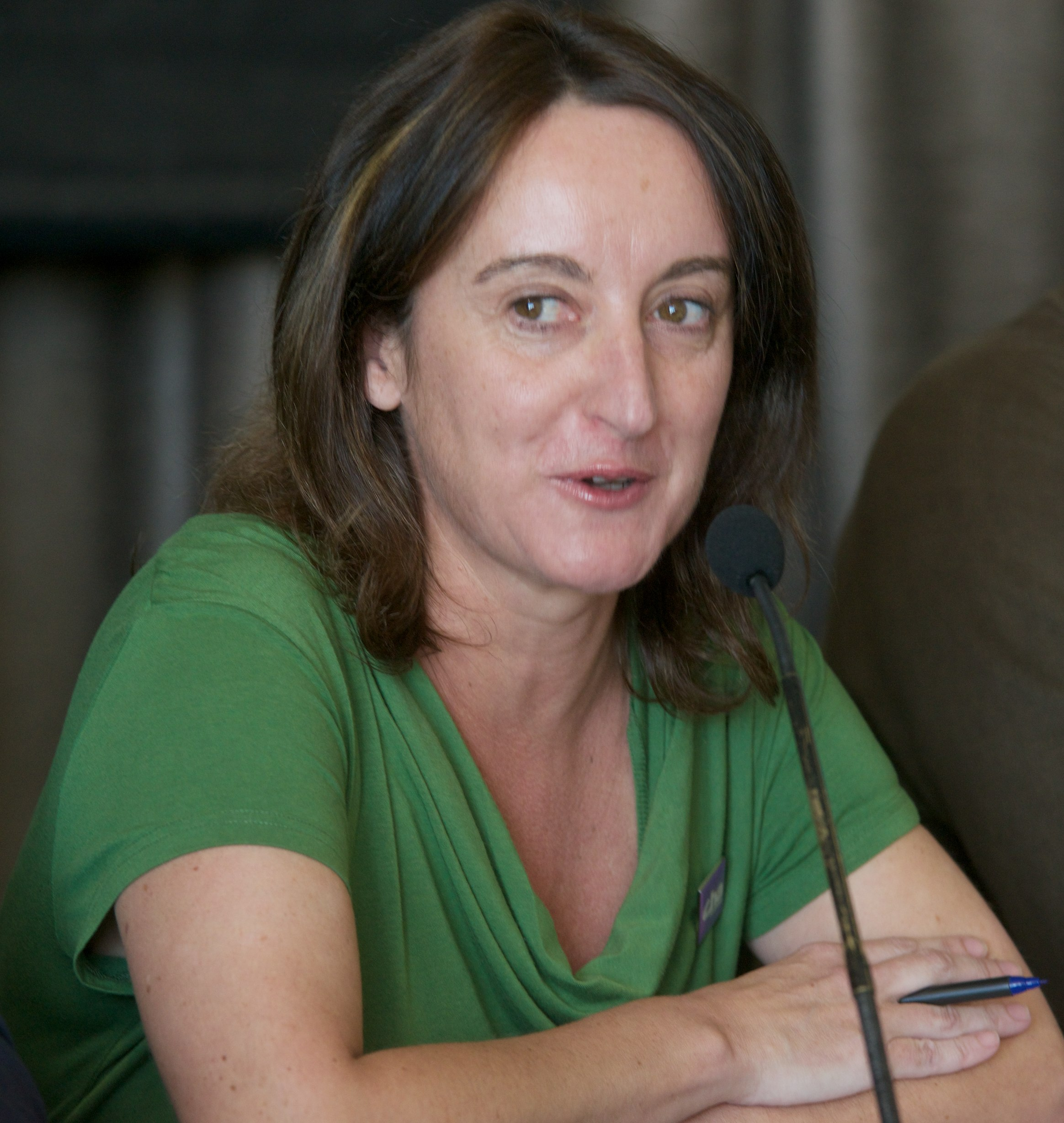
- Ángela Labordeta (2014)
- Born: Ángela Labordeta de Grandes; 1967 (age 58–59); Teruel, Aragón
- Occupations: Writer and journalist

Ángela Labordeta de Grandes is a Spanish writer and journalist.

== Biography ==
Ángela Labordeta was born in Teruel, Aragón, in 1967. She is the daughter of José Antonio Labordeta (brother of Miguel Labordeta) and Juana de Grandes. Her siblings are Paula and Ana Labordeta. Her grandparents are Miguel Labordeta Palacio and Sara Subías Bardají. She lives in Zaragoza, where she studied literature.

Her debut novel, Así terminan los cuentos de hadas, was published in 1994. She is considered one of the most important Spanish writers born in the 1960s.

In 2002, El novio de mi madre was published by Xordica.

Her fiction has been translated into English. In 2006, "My Mother's Boyfriend" appeared in The Modern Review. The English version of her story "Barcelona!!" has been accepted for publication.

== Bibliography ==
=== Novels ===
- Así terminan los cuentos de hadas (1994)
- Rapitán (1997)
- Bombones de licor (2000)
- El novio de mi madre (2002, Xordica)

=== Stories ===
- "My Mother's Boyfriend" The Modern Review

== Sources ==
- Carmen de Urioste, "Narrative of Spanish Women Writers of the Nineties: An Overview"

Tulsa Studies in Women's Literature Vol. 20, No. 2, Women Writing Across the World (Autumn, 2001), pp. 279–295

- José María Izquierdo, "Narradores españoles novísimos de los años noventa." Revista de estudios hispánicos. Washington University, 2001. 293–208.
