= Socorro Venegas =

Mexican writer (born 1972)

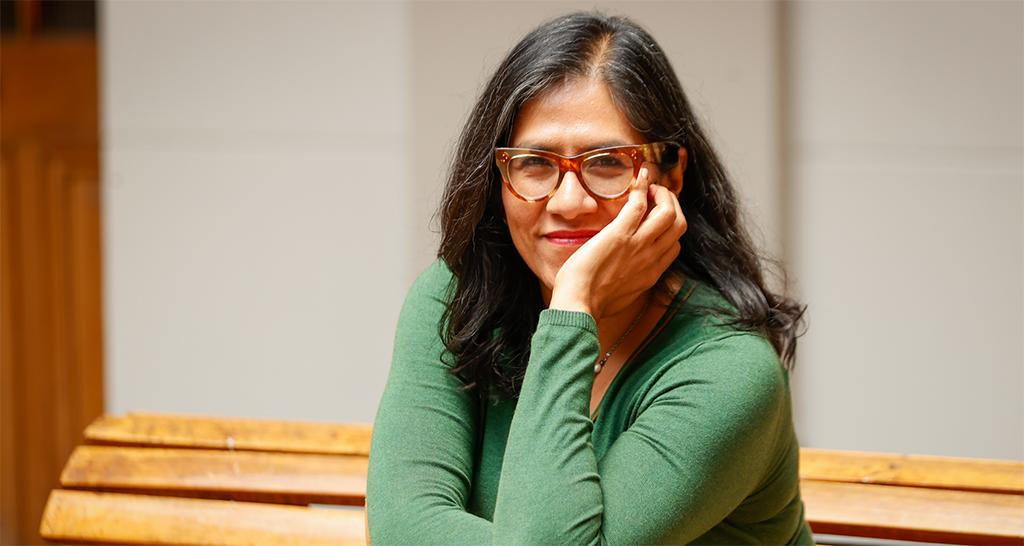
- Born: 1972 (age 53–54); San Luis Potosí
- Occupation: Author

Socorro Venegas (born in 1972) is a Mexican writer.

== Biography ==
Socorro Venegas was born in San Luis Potosí in 1972. She currently lives in Cuernavaca.

Her short story collection Todas las islas was the winner of the 2002 Premio Nacional de Poesía y Cuento "Benemérito de América."

In 2004, her first novel, Será negra y blanca, won the Premio Nacional de Novela Ópera Prima "Carlos Fuentes."

Her stories have appeared in various anthologies, including Nuevas voces de la narrativa mexicana (2003) and Los mejores cuentos mexicanos 2004 (The Best Mexican Short Stories 2004).

Translations of her stories have appeared in Concho River Review, The Modern Review, Literal, and The Listening Eye, among other publications.

== Bibliography ==
Book-length works

- Será negra y blanca (Premio Nacional de Novela Ópera Prima "Carlos Fuentes" 2004)
- Todas las islas (VI Premio Nacional de Poesía y Cuento "Benemérito de América" 2002)
- La muerte más blanca (2000)
- La risa de las azucenas (1997)
- Habitación

Short fiction

- "The Giant and the Moon" Bewildering Stories October 2019
- "Solitude on Maps" Compressed October 2019
- "The Sweet Smell of a Cornered Creature" Bodega 85 September 2019
- "The Laughter of White Lilies" trampset May 2019
