= Museum of Human Evolution =

Museum in Burgos, Spain

Coordinates: 42.3392°N 3.6972°W

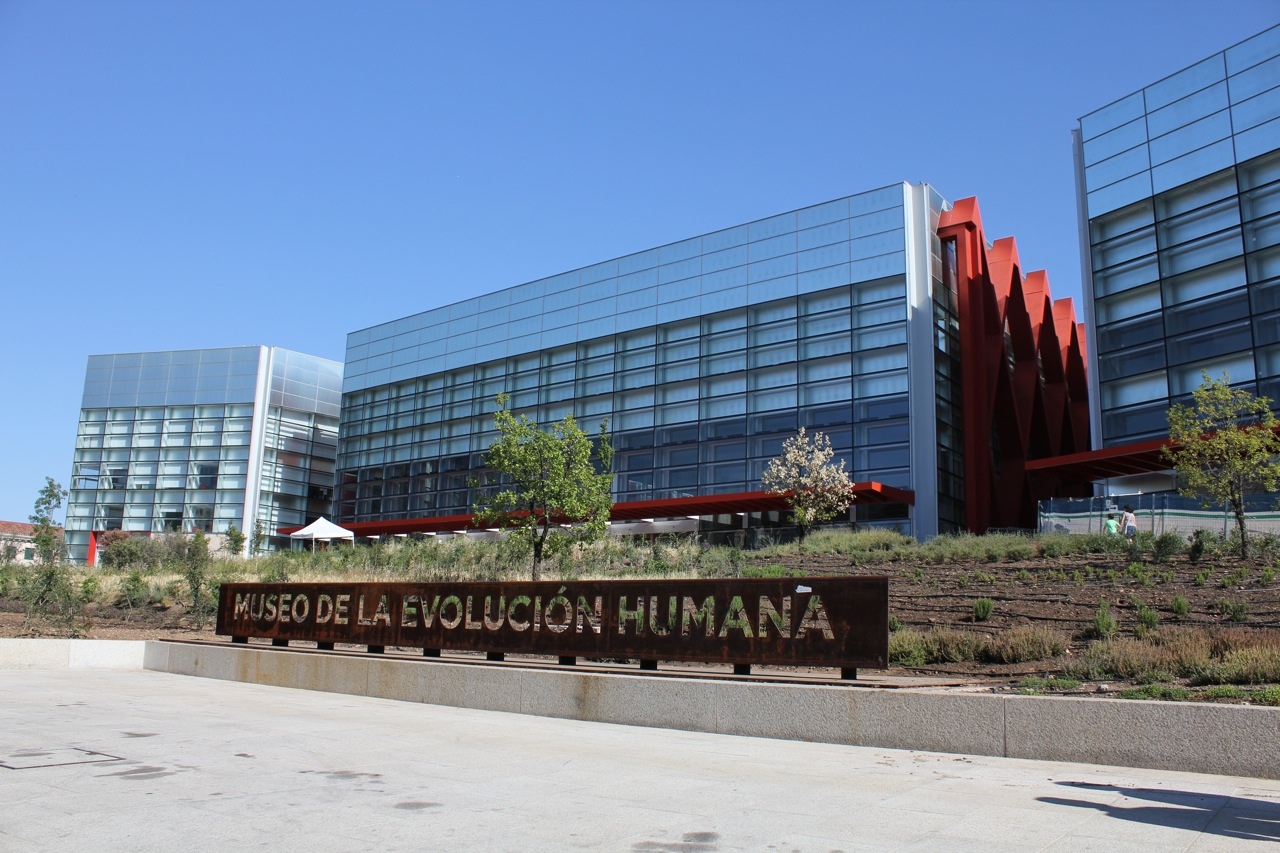
- Established: 2010
- Location: Burgos, Spain
- Visitors: 279.000 (July 2010-July 2011)
- Director: Javier Vicente
- Website: www.museoevolucionhumana.com
- Area: 15,000 m^{2} (160,000 sq ft)

The Museum of Human Evolution (Spanish: Museo de la Evolución Humana - MEH) is situated on the south bank of the river Arlanzón, in the Spanish city of Burgos. It is located roughly 16 kilometers west of the Sierra de Atapuerca, the location of some of the most important human fossil finds in the world. In addition, the Archaeological site of Atapuerca, which was declared a World Heritage Site in 2000, has yielded some of the exhibits at the museum.

Since its inauguration on July 13, 2010, and until July 8, 2011, the museum received a total of 279,000 visitors, thus becoming the most visited museum in Castile and León, and approaching the 10th most visited museum in Spain.

In 2022, the museum managed to recover the pre-pandemic figures, obtaining 142,766 visitors (only the permanent exhibition of the MEH, without counting the visits to the temporary exhibitions, nor to the Archaeological Site of Atapuerca), approaching the 151,877 visits it had in 2019, once again placing itself among the most visited museums in Spain.

It forms the centerpiece of the so-called "Complejo de la Evolución Humana" (Human Evolution Compound), comprising a convention center, the CENIEH research institution, and the museum itself.

== Architecture ==
The building was designed by award-winning Spanish architect Juan Navarro Baldeweg. The land on which it was built was the "solar de Caballería," a large plot of land in central Burgos where once had stood the convent of San Pablo, one of the foremost houses in Castile of the Dominican Order (also known as the Order of Preachers). After its demise in the mid-19th century, military barracks were built in its place.

The demolition of the barracks in the 20th century left a significant, purposeless void used as a car park; not until 2000 was the decision made to build a museum on human evolution in its place. Navarro was chosen as the architect after an international competition where his design won over others made by Cruz y Ortiz, Steven Holl, Arata Isozaki and Jean Nouvel.

The museum includes more than 25 large format projections, 360º circular projection and more than 50 video sources.

== Structure ==
The interior landscaping project recreates the scenery of the Sierra de Atapuerca.

Inside views of the museum

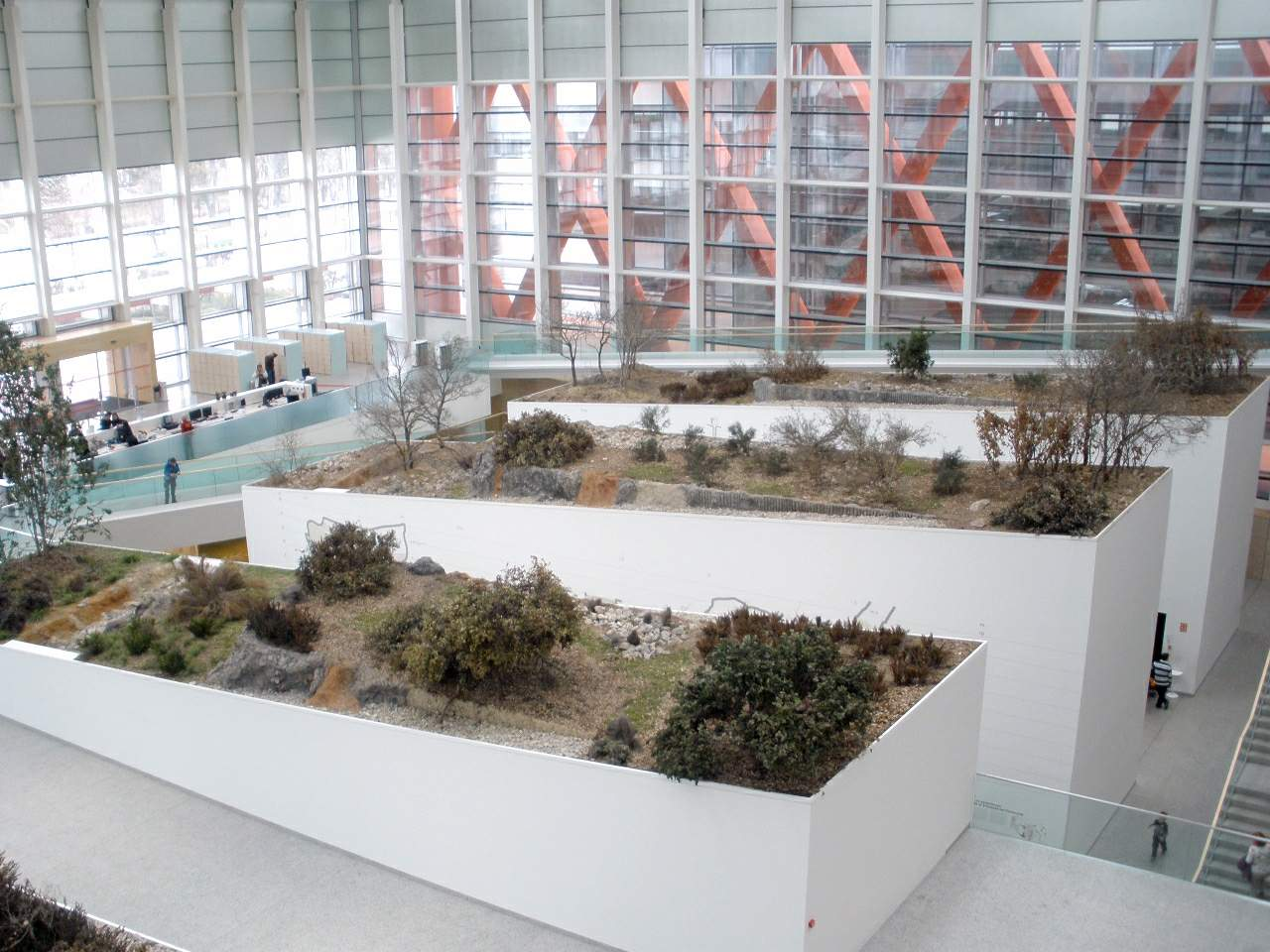

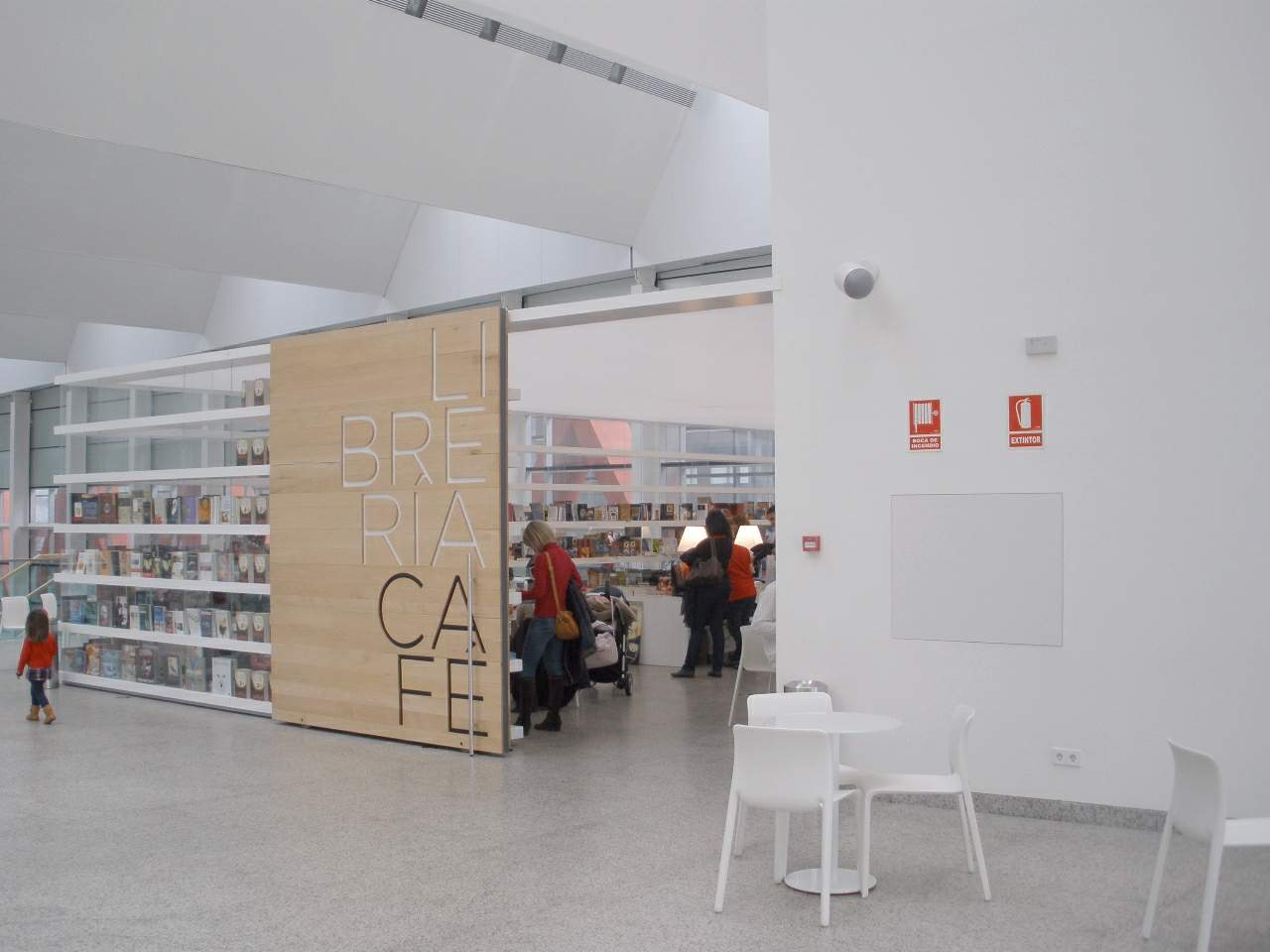

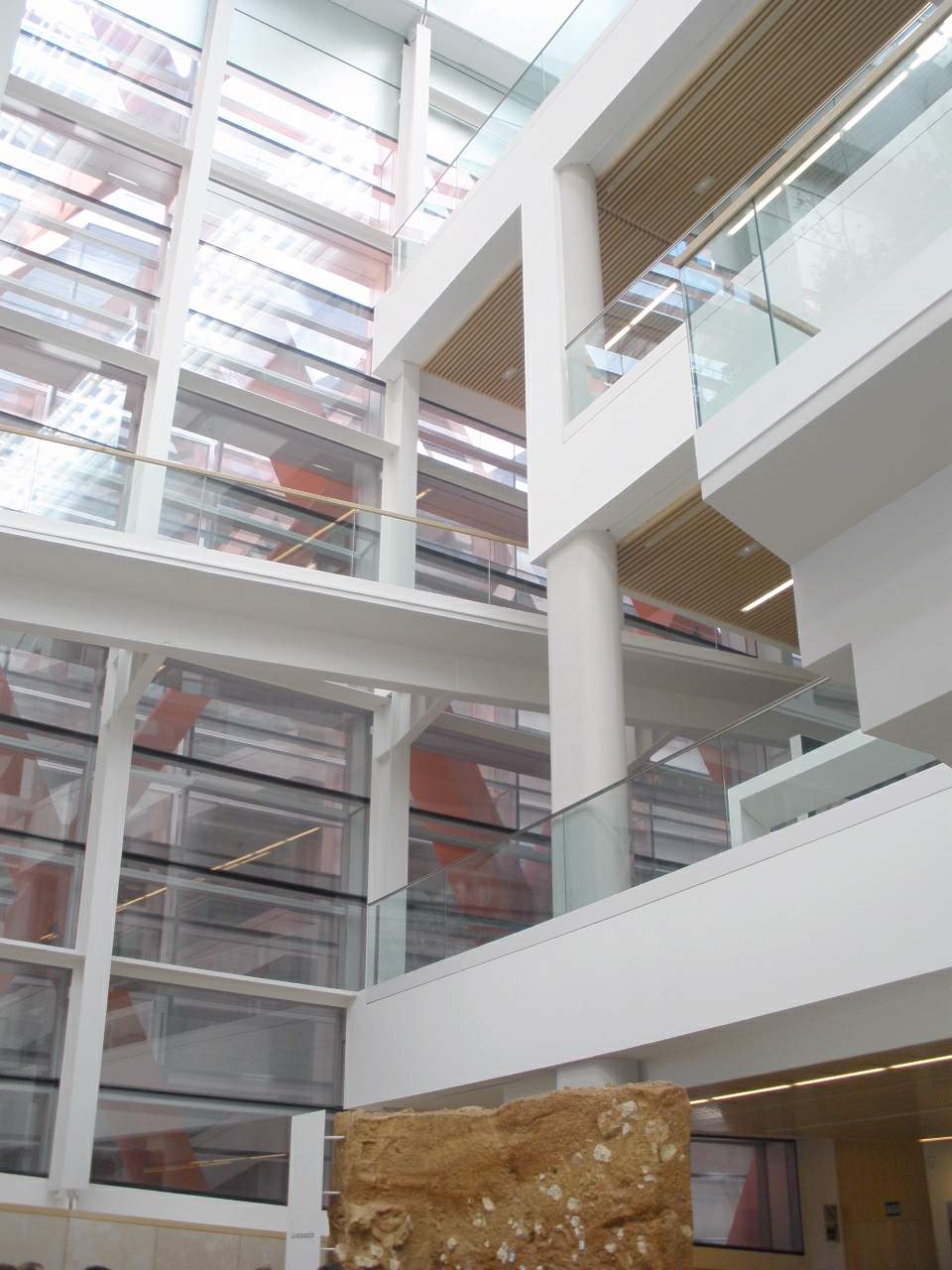

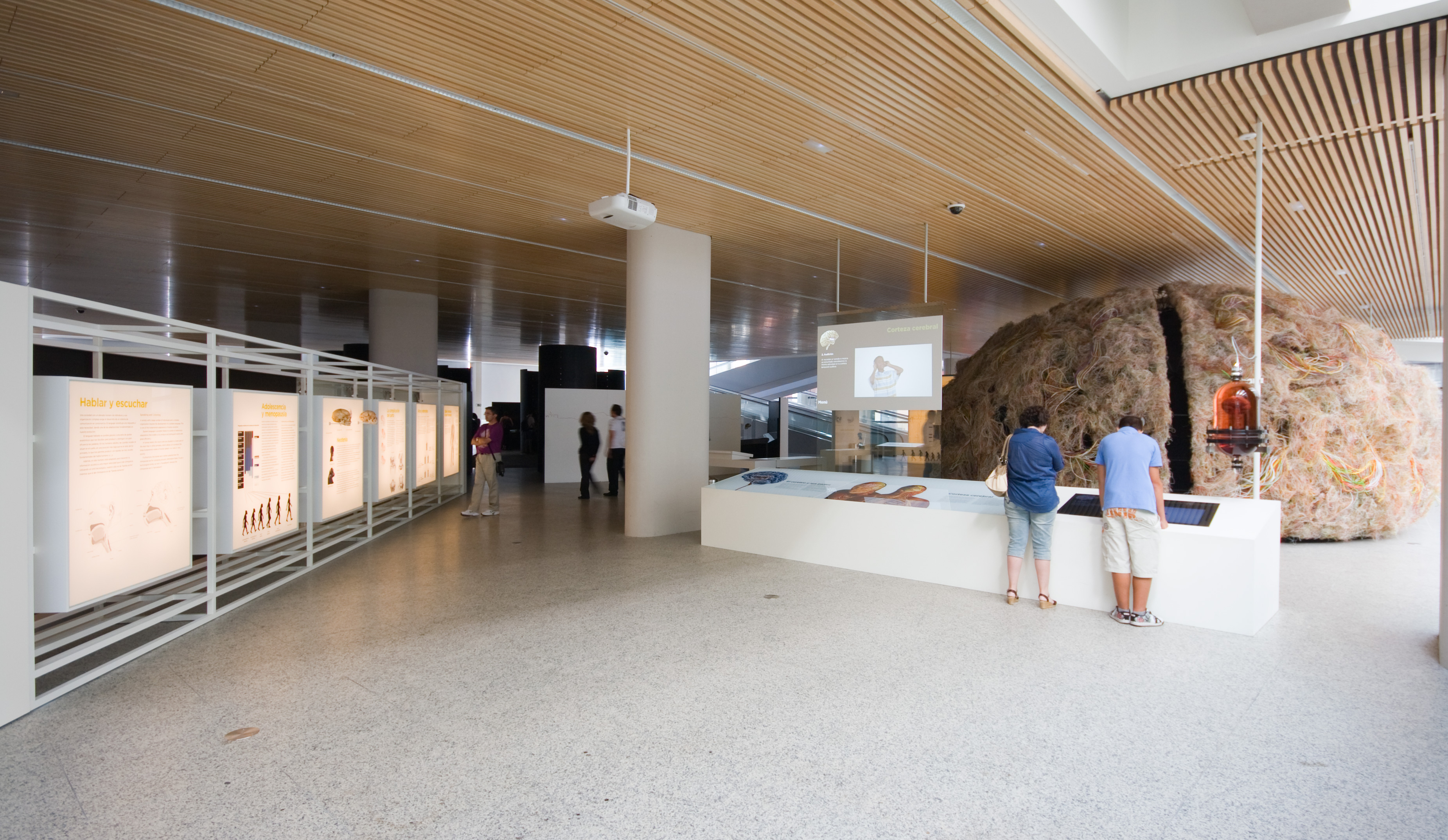

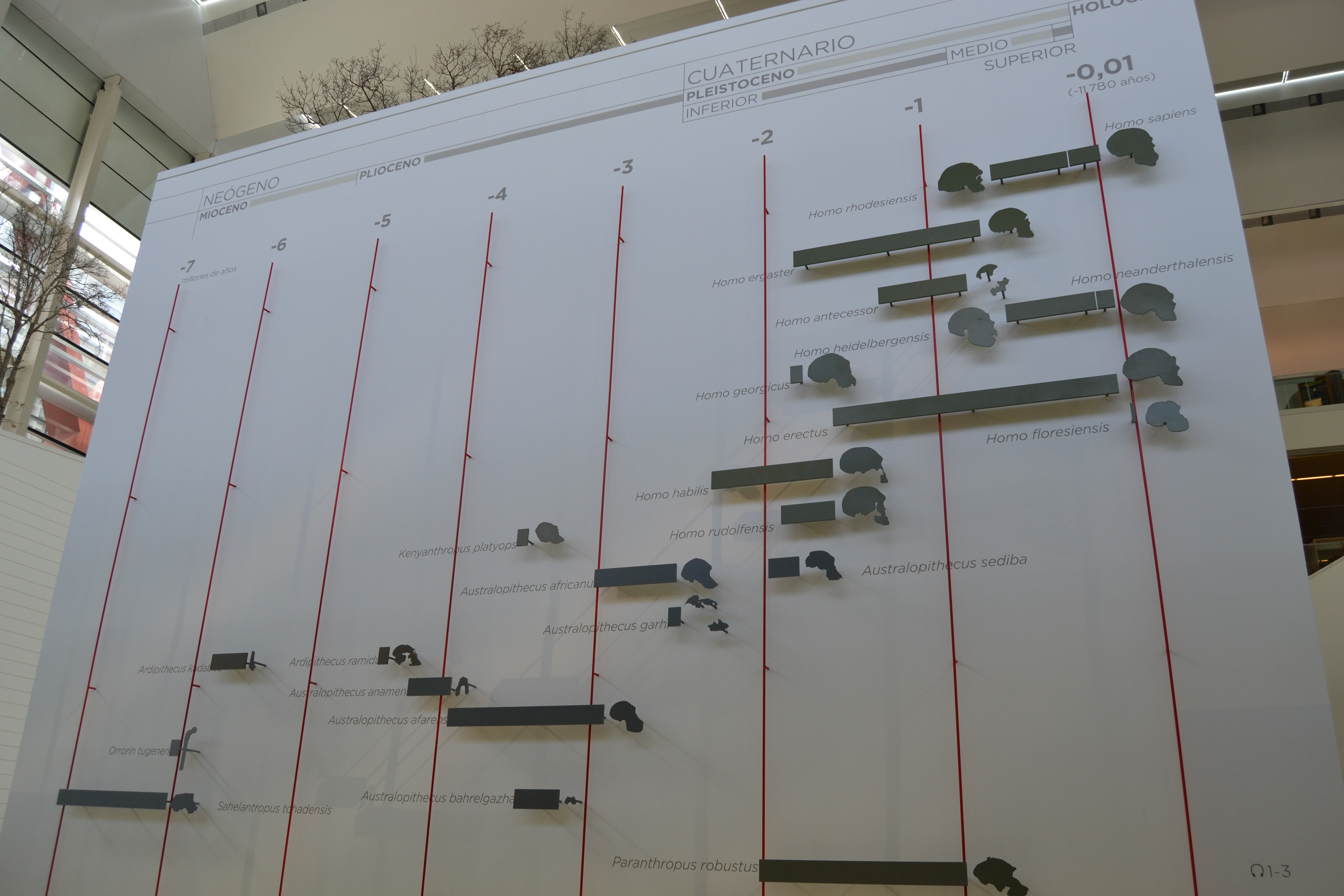

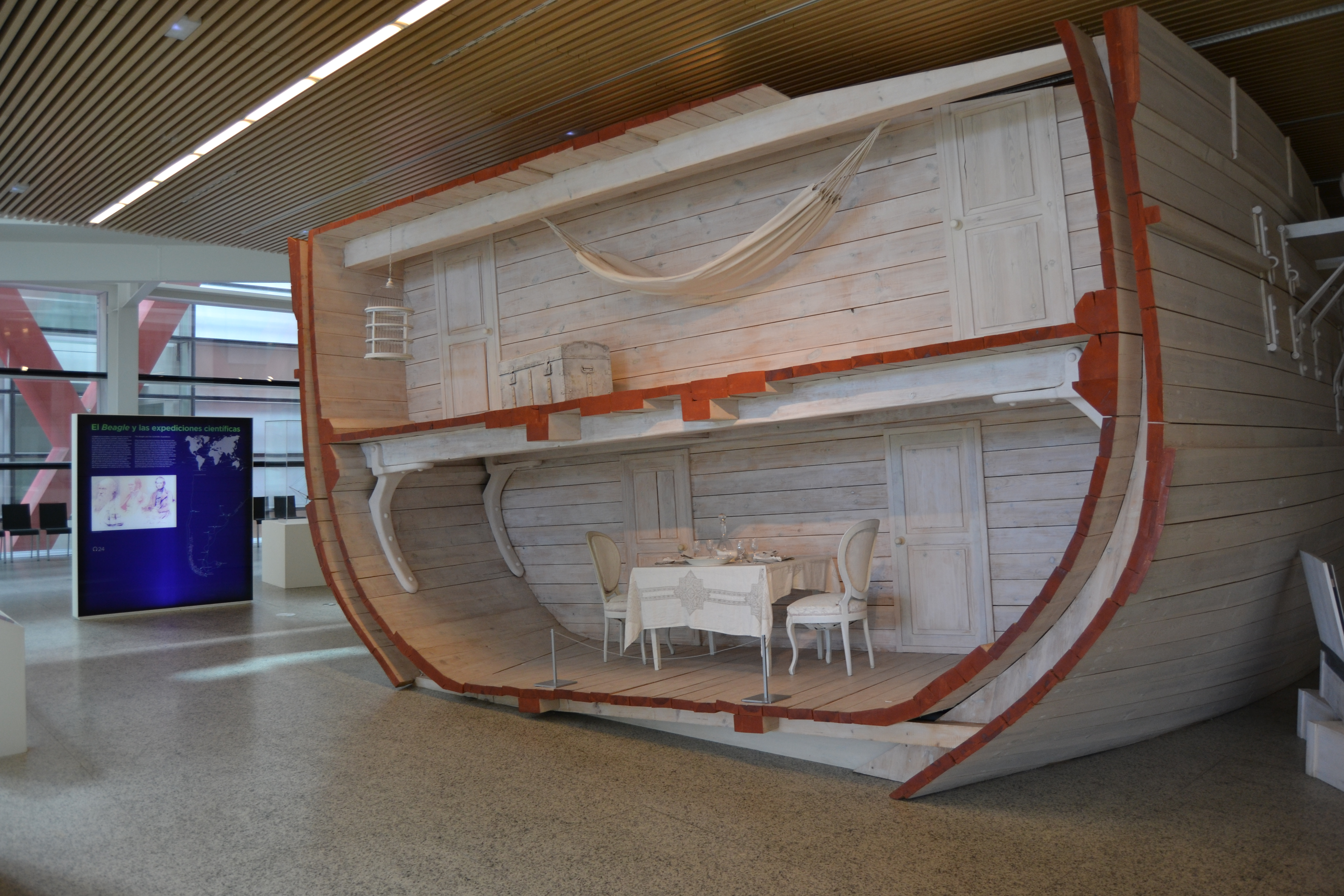

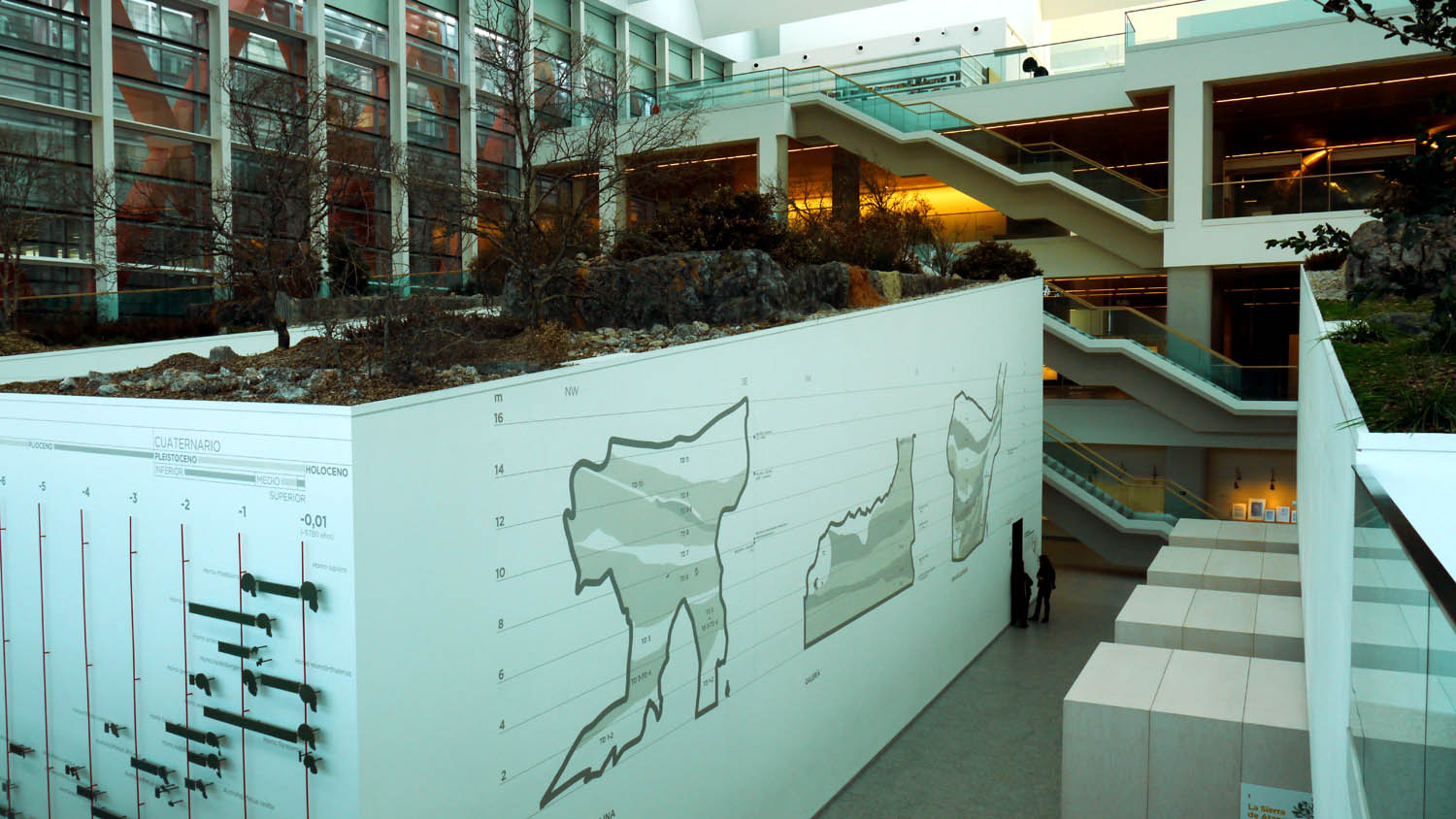

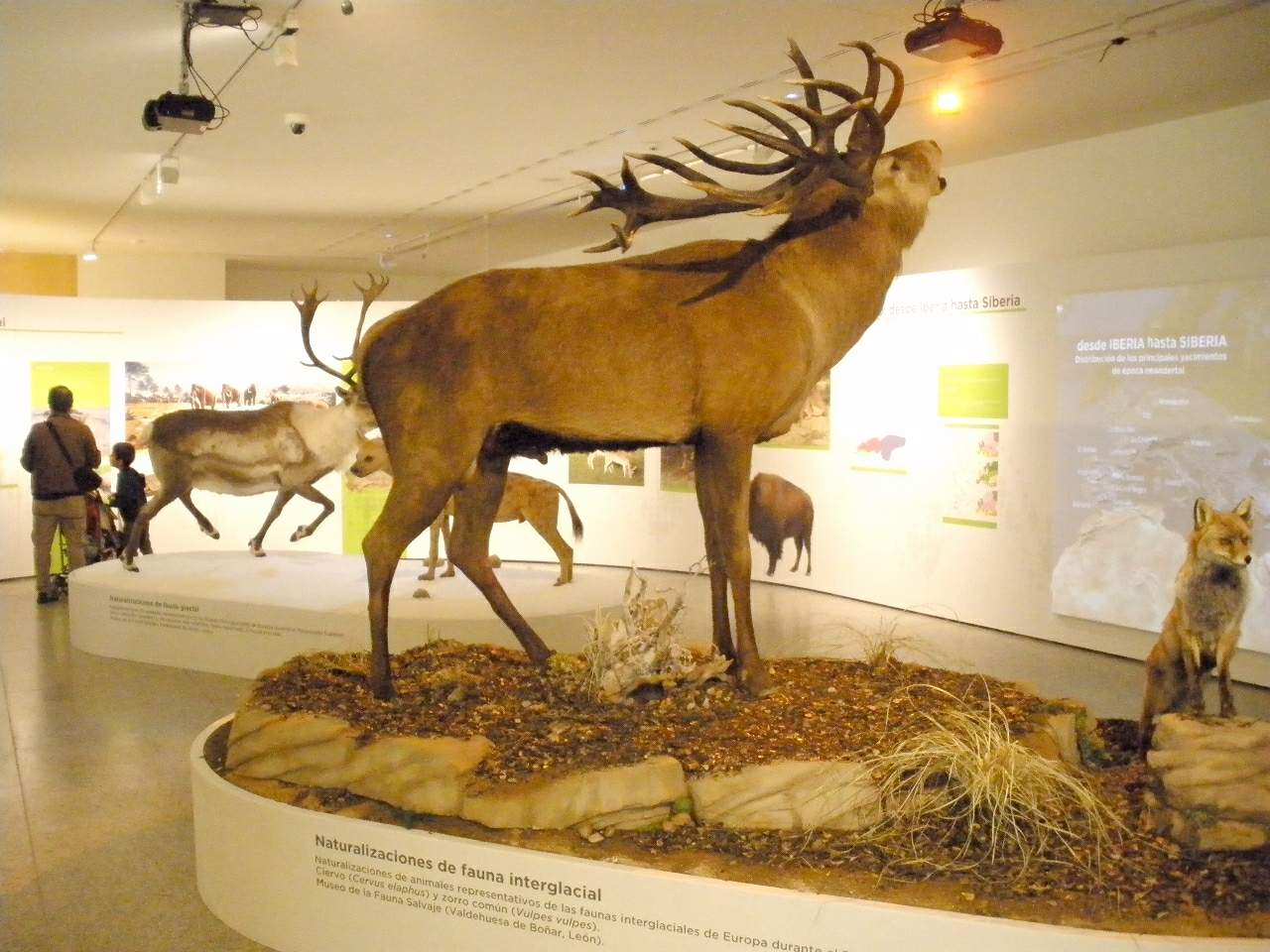

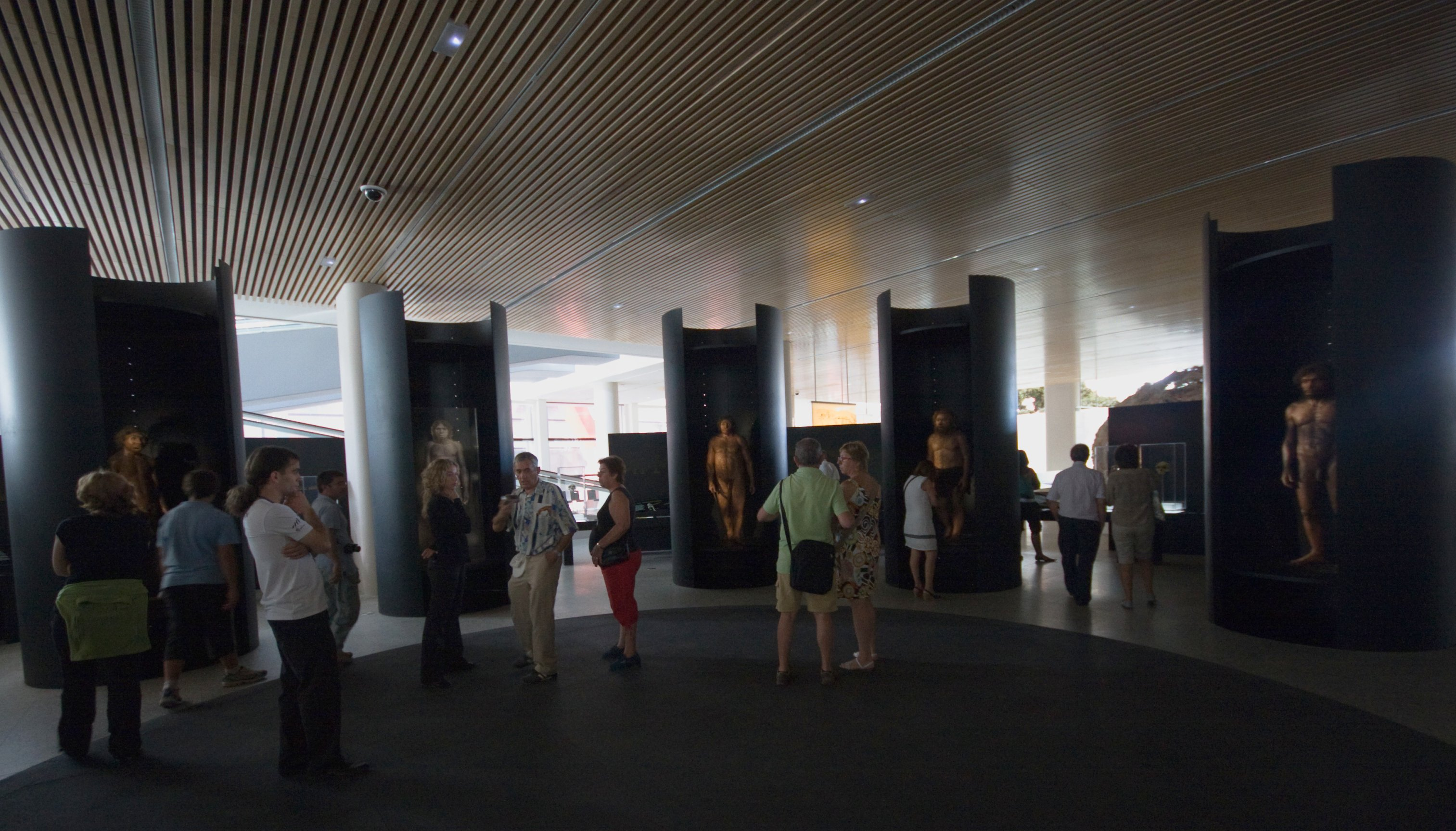

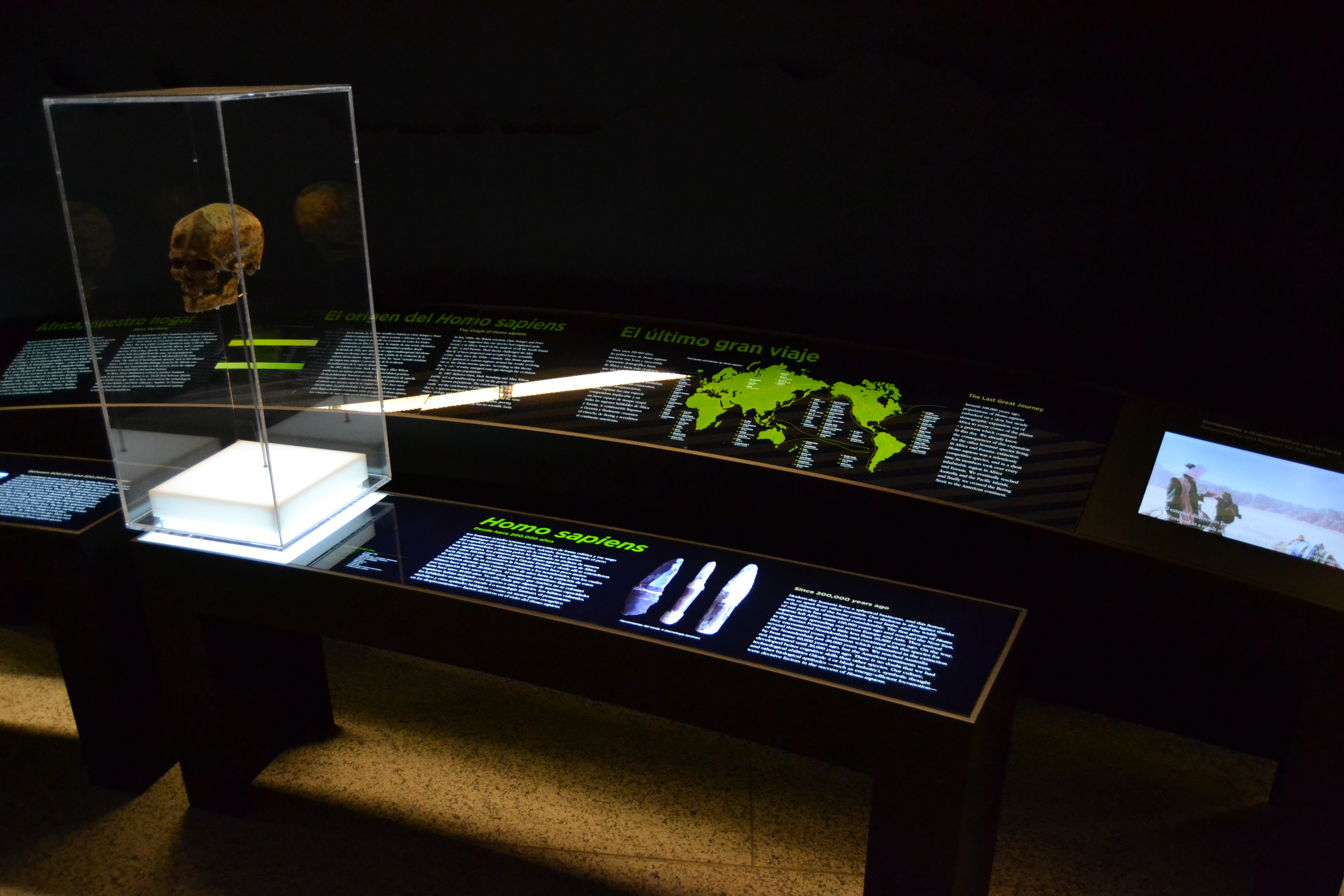

Level -1 displays archaeological and paleontological complex sites of the Sierra de Atapuerca and a reproduction of the Sima de los Huesos. The sites of the Gran Dolina and Sima del Elefante are portrayed.

Level 0 is dedicated the history of human evolution with 10 hyperrealistic reproductions of human ancestors, made by French sculptor Élisabeth Daynès. These 10 inhabitants of the museum represent:

- Australopithecus afarensis (Lucy)
- Australopithecus africanus
- Paranthropus boisei
- Homo habilis
- Homo georgicus
- Homo ergaster
- Homo antecessor
- Homo heidelbergensis
- Homo neanderthalensis
- Homo rhodesiensis

Also on this floor is the reproduction of the stern of HMS Beagle on which Darwin made his nearly 5-year trip around the world, including his stopover in the Galapagos Islands.

Level 1 On this level, the visitor can review different milestones in the evolution of culture.

Level 2 displays three main ecosystems of human evolution: the jungle, savannah, and tundra-steppe of the last glaciation
