= Canto a la libertad =

1987 single by José Antonio Labordeta

Single by José Antonio Labordeta

from the album Tú y yo y los demás
- Language: Spanish
- Released: 1987
- Genre: Protest song
- Label: Fonomusic
- Songwriter: José Antonio Labordeta
- Producer: Tomás Pacheco

José Antonio Labordeta chronology
Aragón	Canto a la libertad (1987)

Canto a la libertad (Chant to Liberty) is the most well-known song by Aragonese singer-songwriter José Antonio Labordeta. It was composed in 1975 to represent "a dream of solidarity, humanity, social justice, hope and freedom" and constitute "a hymn to the Aragonese people".

== Proposal as Anthem of Aragon ==
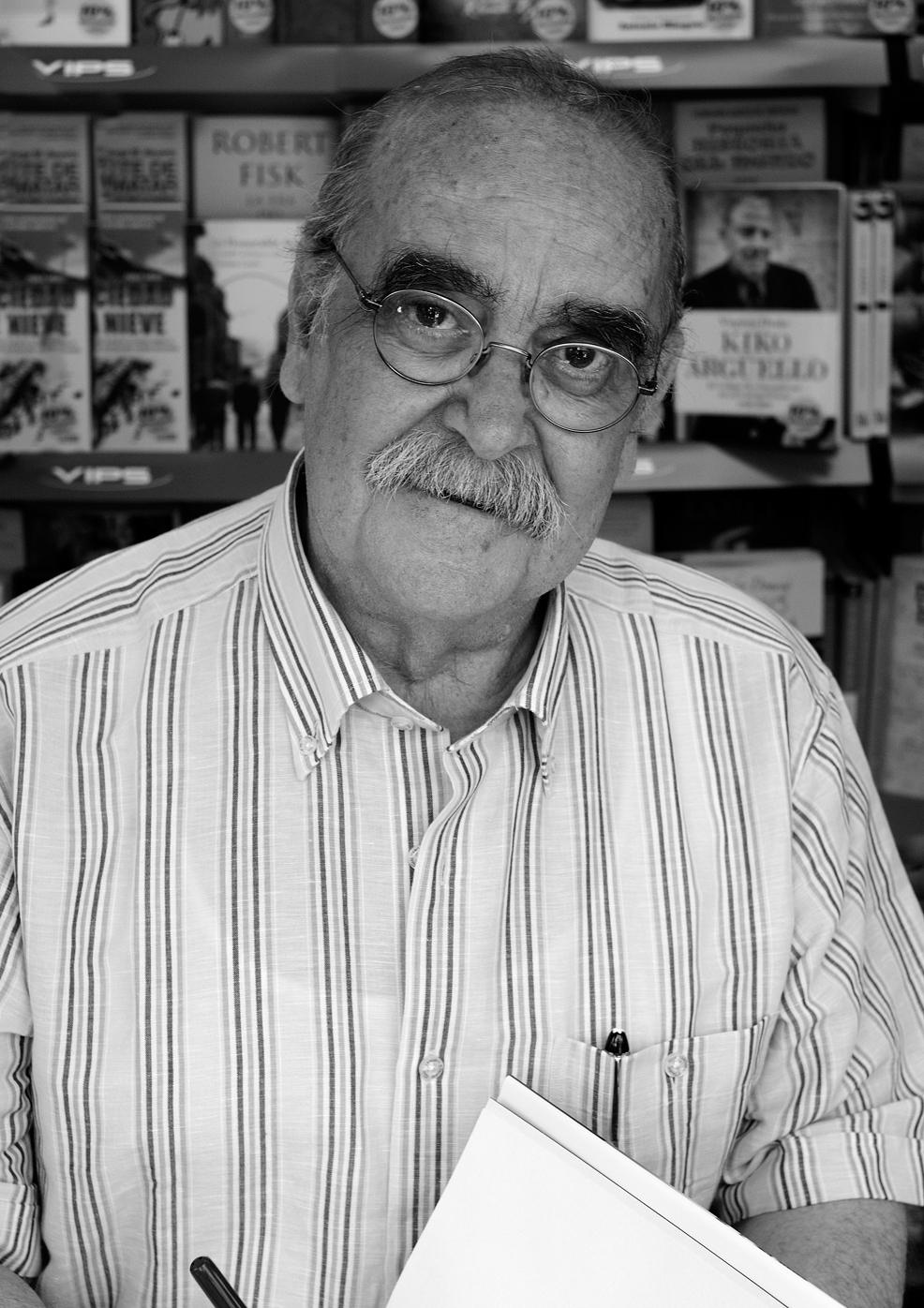
José Antonio Labordeta (2009)

As early as 1989, in the debate for the urgent approval of an Himno de Aragón in the Cortes of Aragon, the Aragonese Party (PAR) proposed Canto a la libertad as the official anthem, after first consulting the initiative with Labordeta. The proposal failed, being only supported by PAR.

The political party Chunta Aragonesista (CHA) (founded in 1986 and for which Labordeta was a member of parliament in the Cortes of Aragon in 1999, and a deputy in the Congress from the year 2000 to 2008) continued to insist it be recognized as the legitimate anthem.

After the death of the author on 19 September 2010, multiple popular campaigns were started with the objective of promoting the adoption of Canto a la libertad as Anthem of Aragon, which included the use of a citizens' initiative as stated in the Statute of Autonomy of Aragon.

In October 2010, with the support of ten social and cultural associations including the Aragonese Institute of Anthropology, the Rolde of Aragonese Studies and the Amparo Poch Association, a committee was created to promote the legislative citizen's initiative for its adoption as the official anthem by the Cortes per the procedure set in the Law 7/1984, which regulates such initiatives.

It was delivered on 22 October 2010 to the Mesa of the Aragonese Cortes, which accepted it for process on 28 October.

Between 25 November 2010, the start of the campaign, and 24 March 2011, when the signatures were presented to the Aragonese Electoral Junta, 24,256 signatures were received, reaching 60% of the required signatures in two-thirds of the time required by the Law 7/1984.

After the Electoral Junta of Aragon was accredited, in case all the minimum requirements be reached, on 5 April 2011, the Mesa of the Cortes of Aragon ordered the publication as a Law Proposition for which Canto a la Libertad would be declared the official Anthem of Aragon.

The dissolution of the Cortes due to the autonomous elections of 22 May 2011 delayed the proposition to the next legislature. When the new deputies got their seats on 7 September, it was debated in the first ordinary plenary session of the Cortes that took place after the elections.

The proposal was ultimately rejected, with 36 votes by the People's Party of Spain against and 26 votes by PSOE, CHA, and United Left in favour.

In 2011, filmmaker Vicky Calavia directed a 30 minute long documentary titled Canto a la libertad. Himno de Aragón. about the song's proposal as Anthem of Aragon.

On 8 October 2011, musicians Pepín Banzo (on the boto bagpipe) and Jesús Quilez (singer) interpreted the song during the opening ceremony for the Fiestas del Pilar, minutes before the celebratory proclamation in the balcony of the town hall of Zaragoza.

On 30 October 2011, actor Jesús Pescador intervened in the Plenary Session of the Zaragoza City Council in the name of the committee to Promote Canto a la Libertad as "Anthem of Aragon", supporting a motion presented to the council in order to get it to support the proposal and also to "find a place for Canto a la Libertad in the Fiestas del Pilar". The motion presented by CHA was finally approved with the support of PSOE and IU.

== See also ==
- List of national anthems
