= Tomás Seral y Casas =

Spanish poet and novelist

Tomás Seral y Casas (1908–1975) was a Spanish poet, novelist and promoter of the historical avant-garde. He was born in Zaragoza on November 18, 1908 and died on July 2, 1975.

== Career ==
Seral y Casas studied in Alagón and Zaragoza. During his student days in 1927, he edited a literary magazine of great interest, Alagonese Life.

=== Literary works ===
His first novel, Hector y yo (Hector and I), appeared in 1928 and incorporated elements of the avant-garde prose and later he released his miscellaneous book Sensualidad y futurismo (Sensuality and futurism), combining prose and vanguard poetry. In 1931 he published Mascando goma de estrellas (Chewing gum for stars) (silly poems), highly rated by critics. Already employing the aesthetics of surrealism he wrote his mature poems Del amor violento (Of violent love) (1933) and Hip of insomnia (1935), in this genre, also following a neopopularist vein. Furthermore, he wrote many gregarious works, published in the book Chilindrinas.

=== Journals and galleries ===
In 1930 Seral y Casas brought out the literary journal Cierzo and two years later its successor, the main vehicle for the concerns of the leading Aragonese characters, founding Noreste (1932-1936) in collaboration with Ildefonso Manuel Gil. Authors of the stature of Benjamin Jarnés and Ramon J. Sender appeared in this journal.

Seral y Casas is also noted as an editor and gallery owner, founding libraries that were established as both spaces where advanced paintings were disseminated as well as where artists gathered in Zaragoza, Madrid and Paris. His editorial Clan published, among others, Violento Idílico (Violent Idyllic) (1949) by the surrealist poet Miguel Labordeta.

He created the Sala Libros in Zaragoza (1940) and in Madrid, successively, the Clan gallery and bookstore (from 1945), the Librería Club (1950), Fernando Fe (1955) and Salas Seral. In Paris, he opened the Librairie Carrel in 1955 only to return soon after to Madrid, where he died in 1975.
