= Himno de Aragón =

Regional anthem of Aragon, Spain

English: Anthem of Aragon
- Regional anthem of Aragon (Spain)
- Lyrics: Ildefonso Manuel Gil, Ángel Guinda, Rosendo Tello and Manuel Vilas
- Music: Antón García Abril
- Adopted: 1989

Audio sample
- Official orchestral instrumental recording (abridged, equivalent to the first four lines of a verse): file; help

"Himno de Aragón" (Spanish pronunciation: [ˈimno‿ðe aɾaˈɣon]; "Anthem of Aragon") is the official anthem of the autonomous community of Aragon in Spain. Its music, based on the oldest Aragonese musical tradition, was written by Aragonese composer Antón García Abril, with lyrics written by Aragonese poets Ildefonso Manuel Gil, Ángel Guinda, Rosendo Tello and Manuel Vilas.

Its use was regulated by a 1989 Aragonese Act, which states that the Anthem of Aragon will be played in all relevant official public events organized by the community or other local-level Aragonese administrations. The Act also indicates that the Anthem can be sung in any of the languages of Aragon. However, the Act does not supply an official version of the lyrics in Aragonese or Catalan.

Another anthem, "Canto a la libertad", is often regarded as the de facto unofficial anthem of Aragon.

== Lyrics ==
Spanish original

I
Nos ha llevado el tiempo al confín de los sueños.
Un nuevo día tiende sus alas desde el sol.
Oh tambores del cierzo, descorred ya las nubes
y a las cumbres ascienda la voz.

El paso de los siglos trazó su destino
que llama a la justicia y a la libertad.
Germinarán los campos, abiertos a sus cielos,
con la verde espiga, los racimos de oro
y el inmarchitable olivo de la paz.

Coro:
¡Luz de Aragón, torre al viento, campana de soledad!
¡Que tu afán propague, río sin frontera, tu razón, tu verdad!
Vencedor de tanto olvido, memoria de eternidad,
pueblo del tamaño de hombres y mujeres, ¡Aragón, vivirás!

Puente:
Resplandece el tiempo;
llega ya la edad
para que la piedra sea manantial,
de enlazar nuestras vidas
y entonar las voces.

II
Desde las blancas cimas donde duerme la nieve
hasta los llanos rojos que mece el aire azul,
un claro cielo enciende, con la frente en el agua,
sus coronas radiantes de luz.

Abramos las ventanas, que cante la noche,
y al ritmo de la vida, en rueda de amor,
se estrecharán las almas, cogidas de la aurora.
Brille la esperanza, se abran los caminos
en la tierra grave como un corazón.

Coro

¡Tierra abierta, pueblo grande, Aragón!
¡Patria mía, patria mía, Aragón!

Aragonese (unofficial)

I
Nos ha levau lo tiempo a lo confín d'os sueños.
Un nuevo día tiende las suyas alas dende lo sol.
Oh tambores d'o cierzo, descorred ya las boiras
y a las cumbres ascienda la voz.

Lo paso d'os sieglos trazó lo suyo destín
que clama a la chusticia y a la libertat.
Germinarán los campos, ubiertos a los suyos ciels,
con a verda espiga, los racimos d'oro
y lo inmarchitable olivera d'a paz.

Coro:
Luz d'Aragón, torre a l'aire, campana de solitut!
Que lo tuyo afán propague, río sin buega, la tuya razón, la tuya verdat!
Vencedor de tanto ixuplido, memoria d'eternidat,
lugar d'a grandaria d'hombres y mullers, Aragón, vivirás!

Puent:
Resplandeixe lo tiempo;
plega ya la edat
pa que la piedra sía manantial,
d'enlazar las nuestras vidas
y entonar las voces.

II
Dende las blancas cimas an aduerme la nieu
Dica los plans royos que cuna l'aire azul,
un claro ciel enciende, con a frent en l'augua,
las suyas coronas radiants de luz.

Ubramos las finestras, que cante la nueit,
Y a lo ritmo d'a vida, en rueda d'amor,
S'estreitarán las almas, pilladas d'a aurora.
Brile la esperanza, s'ubran los camins
En a tierra grieu como un corazón.

Coro

Tierra ubierta, lugar gran, Aragón!
Patria mía, patria mía, Aragón!

Catalan (unofficial)

I
Ens ha portat el temps al confí dels somnis.
Un nou dia tendeix les ales des del sol.
Oh tambors del cerç, descorreu ja els núvols
Ia les cimeres ascendeixi la veu.

El pas dels segles va traçar el destí
Que crida la justícia i la llibertat.
Germinaran els camps, oberts al cel,
Amb la verda espiga, els raïms d'or
I l'immarquitable olivera de la pau.

Cor:
Llum d'Aragó, torre al vent, campana de solitud!
Que el teu afany propagui, riu sense frontera, la teva raó, la teva veritat!
Vencedor de tant oblit, memòria d'eternitat,
Poble de la mida d'homes i dones, Aragó, viuràs!

Pont:
Respon el temps;
Arriba ja l'edat
Perquè la pedra sigui font,
D'enllaçar les nostres vides
I entonar les veus.

II
Des dels blancs cims on dorm la neu
Fins a les planes vermelles que bressola l'aire blau,
Un cel clar encén, amb el front a l'aigua,
Les seves corones radiants de llum.

Obrim les finestres, que canti la nit,
I al ritme de la vida, en roda d'amor,
S'estrenyen les ànimes, agafades de l'aurora.
Brilli l'esperança, s'obrin els camins
A la terra greu com un cor.

Cor

Terra oberta, poble gran, Aragó!
Patria meva, pàtria meva, Aragó!

Poetic English translation

I
Time hath to dream's edge taken us,
A new day from the sun spreadeth its wings.
Draw back the clouds, oh drums of north wind,
May our voice to the heights ascend.

Past centuries marked out thy destiny,
Thee which calleth to freedom and justice.
Thy fields shall sprout upwards into the sky
With the green spike, the gold clusters,
The imperishable olive tree of peace.

Chorus:
Light of Aragon, tower in the wind, bell of solitude!
May thy zeal spread, a river without bounds … thy reason, thy truth!
Victory o'er much oblivion, memory of eternity,
Of men and women aplenty, Aragon, live on!

Bridge:
Time shineth
And age arriveth
So long rock with water floweth.
To link our lives,
To modulate our voices.

II
From the white peaks where snow sleepeth,
To red plains by blue air sway'd.
A clear sky with its face in water kindleth,
Its crowns radiant with light.

Let's open the windows so that night shall sing,
To the rhythm of life in a ring of love;
Souls shall embrace caught by dawn.
May hope shine, may roads open
wholeheartedly into the land.

Chorus

Open land, folk grand, o Aragon!
My homeland, my homeland, Aragon!

== See also ==
- Anthems of the autonomous communities of Spain
