= Juan Navarro Baldeweg =

Spanish painter

Juan Navarro Baldeweg (born June 11, 1939, in Santander, Cantabria) is a Spanish architect, painter, and sculptor. He directs the architectural studio Navarro Baldeweg Asociados in Madrid.

== Biografía ==
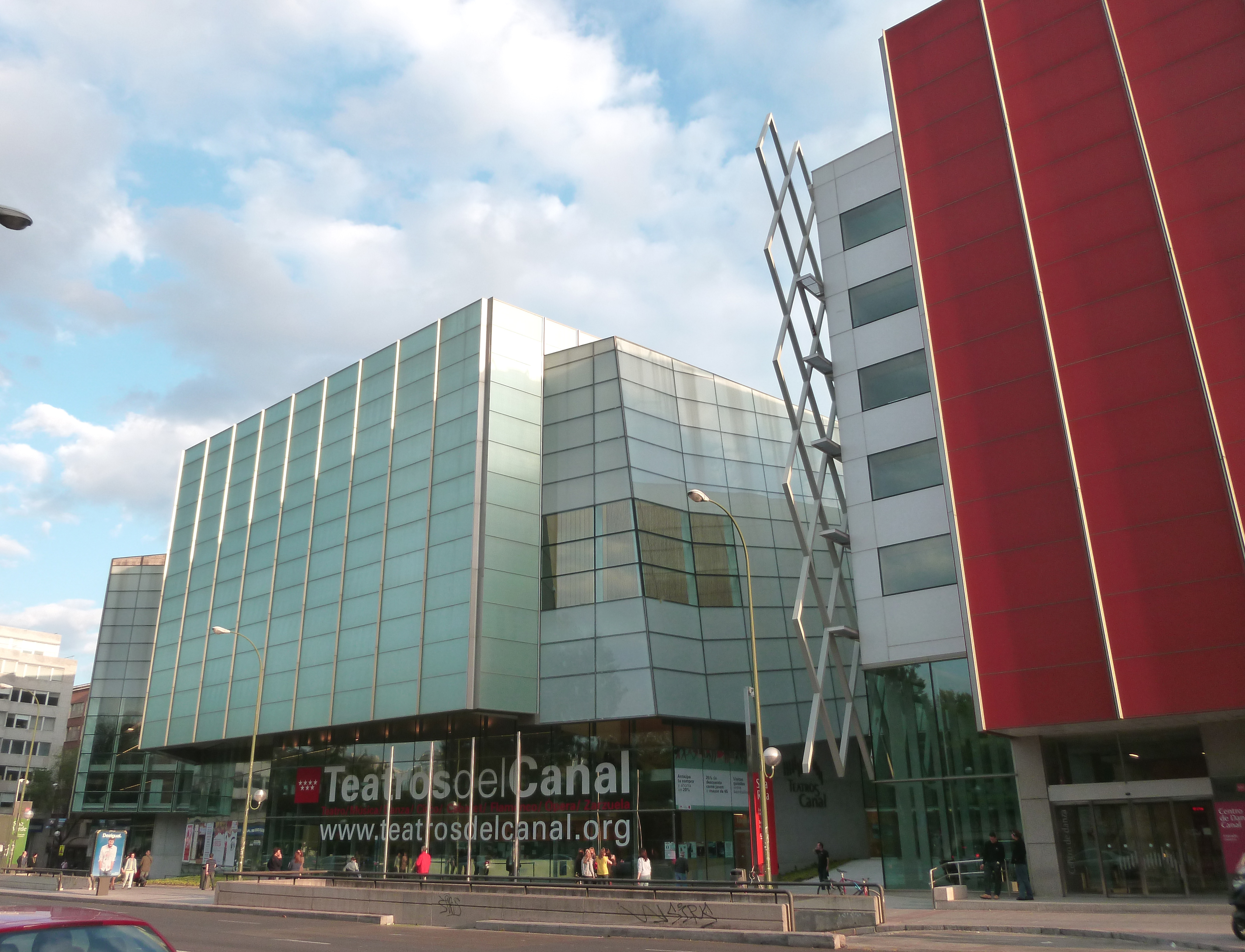
Teatros del Canal, Madrid

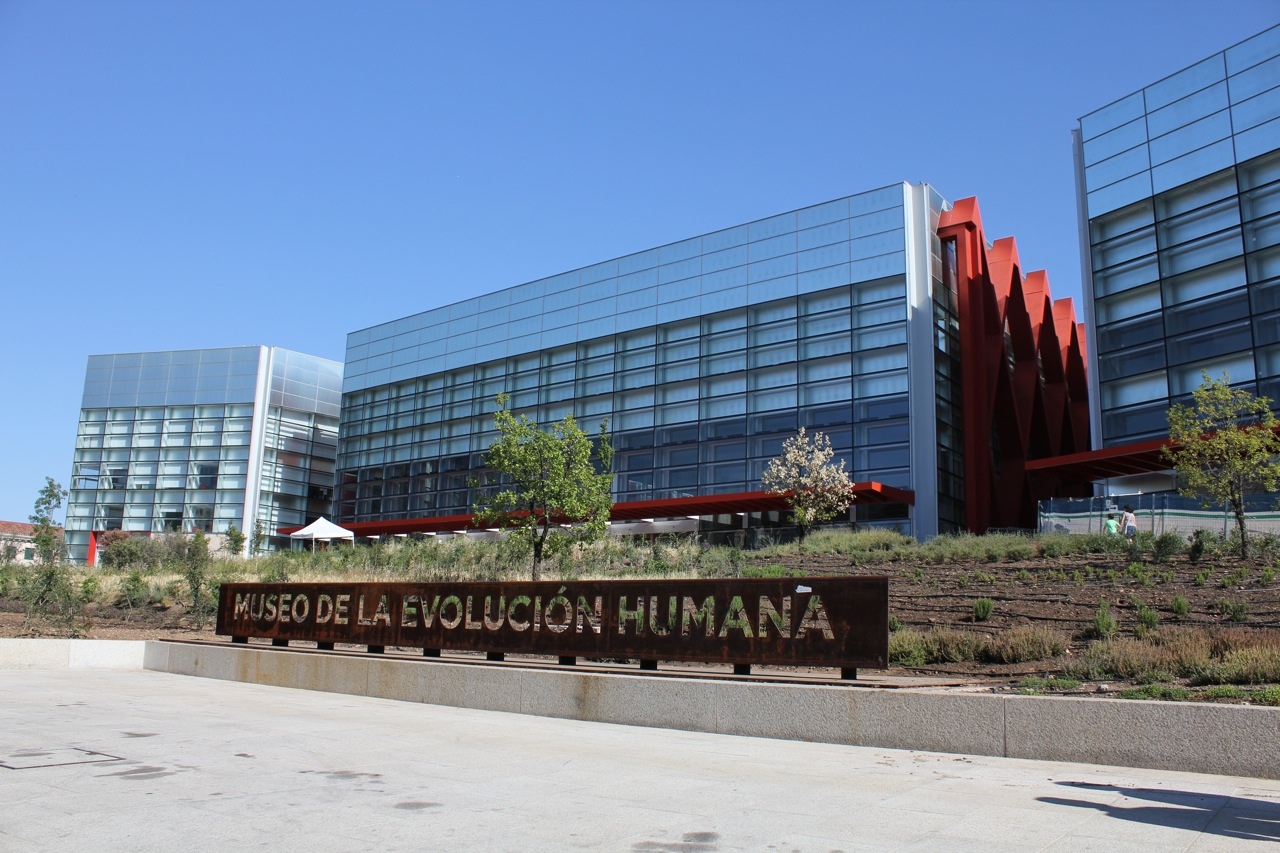
Museum of Human Evolution, Burgos

Between 1959 and 1960, he studied engraving at the School of Fine Arts of San Fernando. He graduated in 1965 from the School of Architecture of the Technical University of Madrid, where he also obtained his doctorate in 1969. Between 1969 and 1971, he received a scholarship from IBM that allowed him to develop his research line at the Computing Center of Madrid. There, he focused on the translation of technological processes into the social and urban planning sphere, continuing with the research line of his doctoral thesis. He has been a visiting professor in Philadelphia, Yale, Princeton, at the Graduate School of Design of Harvard University - like Kenzō Tange - and in Barcelona. He is a professor in the Department of Architectural Projects at the same school where he graduated, and where as a teacher he introduced metaphorical visions of architecture compared to the materialistic approach of Professor Javier Carvajal or the tectonics of Professor Vázquez de Castro. He has combined his career as an architect with the study and practice of painting, sculpture, and works that art critics like Ángel González, Juan José Lahuerta, or William Curtis have related to the connections of 20th-century artistic avant-gardes with lines of archaic tradition.

In his early professional years, he worked in the studio of architect Alejandro de la Sota.

He was granted a scholarship by the Juan March Foundation in 1974 to pursue postgraduate studies at the Center For Advanced Visual Studies at the Massachusetts Institute of Technology in Cambridge (Massachusetts), where he was a student of György Kepes. It was during this time that he worked following Kepes's proposal to understand the object as a concrete visualizer of the invisible qualities of the context. This theme would be discussed in his essays "Complementary Geometry" and "An Object is a Section."

In his architectural work, he has been associated with his contemporaries Álvaro Siza Vieira, Alberto Campo Baeza and Rafael Moneo. With the first, he shared an interest in the formal and compositional integration of contemporary architecture into the scales and rhythms of the environments in which it was inscribed. With the second, he shared an interest in the importance of light and gravity in architecture. And with the third, he shared rationalist evocations of classical and Scandinavian historical contexts. Initially, however, Navarro's work sought a translation of figurations and formal systems from art, especially from the first half of the 20th century. Subsequently, he has evolved towards formal speculations, like those of other architects of his generation.

Throughout his career Baldeweg won numerous architectural design competitions, including for the Castilla y León Convention Center in Salamanca (1985), Olympic Village Training Pavilion in Barcelona (1988), Congress and Convention Center of Cádiz (1988), Ministry Buildings for the Regional Government of Extremadura in Mérida (1989), Congress Center of Salzburg (1992), Museum for the Salvador Allende Collection in Santiago de Chile (1993), Bibliotheca Hertziana, Max-Planck-Gesellschaft in Rome (1995), Cultural Center in Benidorm (1997), Canal Theatres in Madrid and Museum of Human Evolution in Burgos (2000). In 1990, he received Spain's National Award for Plastic Arts.

He has also intermittently undertaken historical critical work, providing interpretations of the work of Alejandro de la Sota, Heinrich Tessenow, Louis Isadore Kahn, or Konstantín Mélnikov. In 1998, he received the Tessenow Gold Medal awarded by the Alfred Toepfer Stiftung FVS for the entirety of his work. The medal allowed him to grant the Tessenow Stipend to architect Andrés Jaque, co-author with him in 2004 of the book on the Russian architect Konstantín Mélnikov. He is a Numerary Academician of the Royal Academy of Fine Arts of San Fernando, where he succeeded the also architect and painter Joaquín Vaquero Turcios. His inaugural speech, titled "The Horizon in Hand," contained a reflection on artistic and architectural creation as the encounter of two impulses: the gaze towards the limit where objects reconcile with the contexts they activate, described by Navarro Baldeweg with the metaphor of the horizon; and desire as a driving force, described by Navarro with the image of Picasso's blind minotaur reaching out to perceive the object of his desire.

He is currently a member of the Royal Academy of Fine Arts of San Fernando and of the European Academy of Sciences and Arts.

== Work ==
=== Architecture ===
- House of the Rain, Liérganes, Spain (1978-1982).
- Mills of the Segura River, Murcia, Spain (1984-1988).
- Social Services Center and Library at Puerta de Toledo, Madrid, Spain (1985-1992).
- Congress and Exhibition Center of Castilla y León or Congress Palace of Salamanca. 1st prize, Salamanca, Spain (1985-1992).
- Urban Remodeling Project, Turin, Italy (1986).
- Congress and Exhibition Center. 1st prize, Cadiz, Spain (1988).
- Training Pavilion in the Olympic Village. 1st prize, Barcelona, Spain (1988).
- Entertainment Center, Blois, France (1991).
- Congress Center. 1st prize, Salzburg, Austria (1992).
- Trade Fairground, Silleda, Spain (1992).
- Studio House for the painter Gordillo, Madrid, Spain (1992).
- Headquarters for the Extremadura Regional Government Departments. 1st prize, Mérida, Spain (1992-1995).
- Cultural Center, Villanueva de la Cañada, Spain (1992-1997).
- Museum and Cultural Center Salvador Allende. 1st prize, Santiago de Chile, Chile (1993).
- Courthouse Building, Mahón, Spain (1993-1995).
- Ministry of Industry and Tourism, Toledo, Spain (1993-1996).
- Proposal for the Museum Island, Berlin, Germany (1994).
- Hertziana Library. 1st prize, Rome, Italy (1995).
- Extension of the Woolworth Center for Music, Princeton, USA (1995-1997).
- National Museum and Research Center of Altamira, Santillana del Mar, Cantabria, 1995–2000
- Departmental Building at Pompeu Fabra University. 1st prize, Barcelona, Spain (1996-2007).
- Cultural Center. 1st prize, Benidorm, Spain (1997-2006).
- Extension Project of the Reina Sofía National Museum and Art Center, Madrid, Spain (1999).
- Center for Performing Arts of the Community of Madrid. 1st prize, Madrid, Spain (2000).
- National Research Center, Museum of Human Evolution and Congress Palace, Burgos, Spain (2000-2009).
- Martos Mill and Balcony of the Guadalquivir Restoration, Córdoba, Spain (2001-2005).
- Palace of Music and Performing Arts. 1st prize, Vitoria, Spain (2002).
- Institute of Knowledge, Amersfoort, Netherlands (2003).
- City of Flamenco Project, Jerez de la Frontera, Spain (2004).
- Installation for the Italian Pavilion at the 9th Biennial, Venice, Italy (2004).
- Congress Palace and Hotel Project, Palma de Mallorca, Spain (2005).
- Linear Park Project of the Manzanares, Madrid, Spain (2005).
- Tribute to Barragán at the Furniture Fair, Milan, Italy (2005).
- Remodeling of the Serpis Riverbank and Tirant lo Blanch Square, Gandía (2010).
- New Central University Hospital of Asturias, Oviedo, Asturias (2013).
- Expansion of the Courts of Mahón, Menorca, Spain (2013).
- Novartis Administrative Headquarters, Basel, Switzerland (2014).
- Headquarters of the Pasqual Maragall Foundation, Barcelona, Spain (2016).
- Remodeling of the eastern cell of the Capitol and positioning of the Winged Victory, Brescia, Italy (2020).
- Repositioning of the Pugilatore in the Brescia Museum, Italy (2023).

=== Visual Arts ===
- Installation "Light and Metals" (1976).
- "Domestic Hydraulics" (Milan Triennial, Italy 1986).
- The Resonance Box Recent Painting. Marlborough Gallery (Madrid 2000).
- John Soane architect, 1753-1837 (Soane Resonances, Center 2000).
- International Study of Architecture Andrea Palladio (Palazzo Barbaran da Porto, Vicenza, Italy 2000).
- Museum of Fine Arts (Santander 2001).
- Galician Center of Contemporary Art (Santiago de Compostela 2002).
- Marlborough Gallery (Madrid 2002).
- The resonance box Aam Gallery (Milan, Italy 2003).
- The Crystal Cup. Abbey of Santo Domingo de Silos (Burgos 2004).
- Sculpture. Marlborough Gallery (Madrid 2004).
- Recent Paintings. Marlborough Gallery Chelsea (New York, United States 2005).
- Light, balance and hand. Academy of Architecture Gallery of Mendrisio (Switzerland 2006).
- Room with figure. Variations. Senda Gallery (Barcelona 2006).
- A resonance box. Chapel of the Palace of Carlos V. The Alhambra of Granada (Granada 2007).
- To paint, To paint. Malborough Gallery (Madrid 2010).
- To paint, To paint. Malborough Gallery Chelsea (New York, United States 2011).
- Weightless or light. Jorge Oteiza Museum Foundation (Navarra 2011).
- A Zodiac. ICO Foundation, Madrid, 2014.
- Two by Two. Marlborough Gallery (Madrid, 2016).
- To Do, Ways of Doing. Marlborough Gallery (Barcelona, 2018).
- Simultaneous Figures. Patio Herreriano Museum (Valladolid, 2019).
- In a Field of Energy and Process. City Museum (Brescia, 2020).
- Then and Now. Marlborough Gallery (Madrid, 2022).

== Awards and Recognitions ==
- National Prize for Plastic Arts (1990).
- Heinrich Tessenow Gold Medal (1998).
- Honorary Fellow of The American Institute of Architects (2001).
- Gold Medal for Merit in Fine Arts (2007).
- Gold Medal of Spanish Architecture (2008).
- X Spanish Biennial of Architecture Prize (2009).
- National Prize for Architecture of Spain (2014).
