= Modern Review (North American) =

The Modern Review December 2005 issue

The Modern Review was a magazine based in Richmond Hill, Ontario, Canada that styles itself a "North American literary journal".

The first issue, 58 pages thick, is dated September 2005. It is published quarterly by the Parsifal Press Literary Arts Association, a nonprofit organization. All printing, binding, and finishing is done in-house with professional machinery.

The magazine describes its philosophy this way: The editorial mission of the Modern Review is to dispute literary borders on an international stage, to educate, and to foster both an appreciation and desire for a higher standard in the written arts. To make no alliances, and cultivate no preference of one class or movement over another, but to act as a point where artistic integrity meets the risk-taking means which will promote its cause with zeal and diligence. The desired end is sustained access to a relevant literature, one that refuses to oppose tradition to innovation, the personal to the objective.

(ISSN 1557-265X)

== Masthead ==
- Editor-in-Chief: Simone dos Anjos
- Editor: Pietro Aman
- Advisors: Jennifer Moxley, Geoffrey G. O'Brien

== Contributors ==
- John Ashbery
- Robert Bly
- Landis Everson
- Espido Freire
- Peter Gizzi
- Fanny Howe
- Andrew Joron
- Robert Kelly
- John Kinsella
- Ángela Labordeta
- William Logan
- Jennifer Moxley
- Geoffrey G. O'Brien
- Marjorie Perloff
- Socorro Venegas
- Joshua Marie Wilkinson
