= Espido Freire =

Spanish novelist (born 1974)

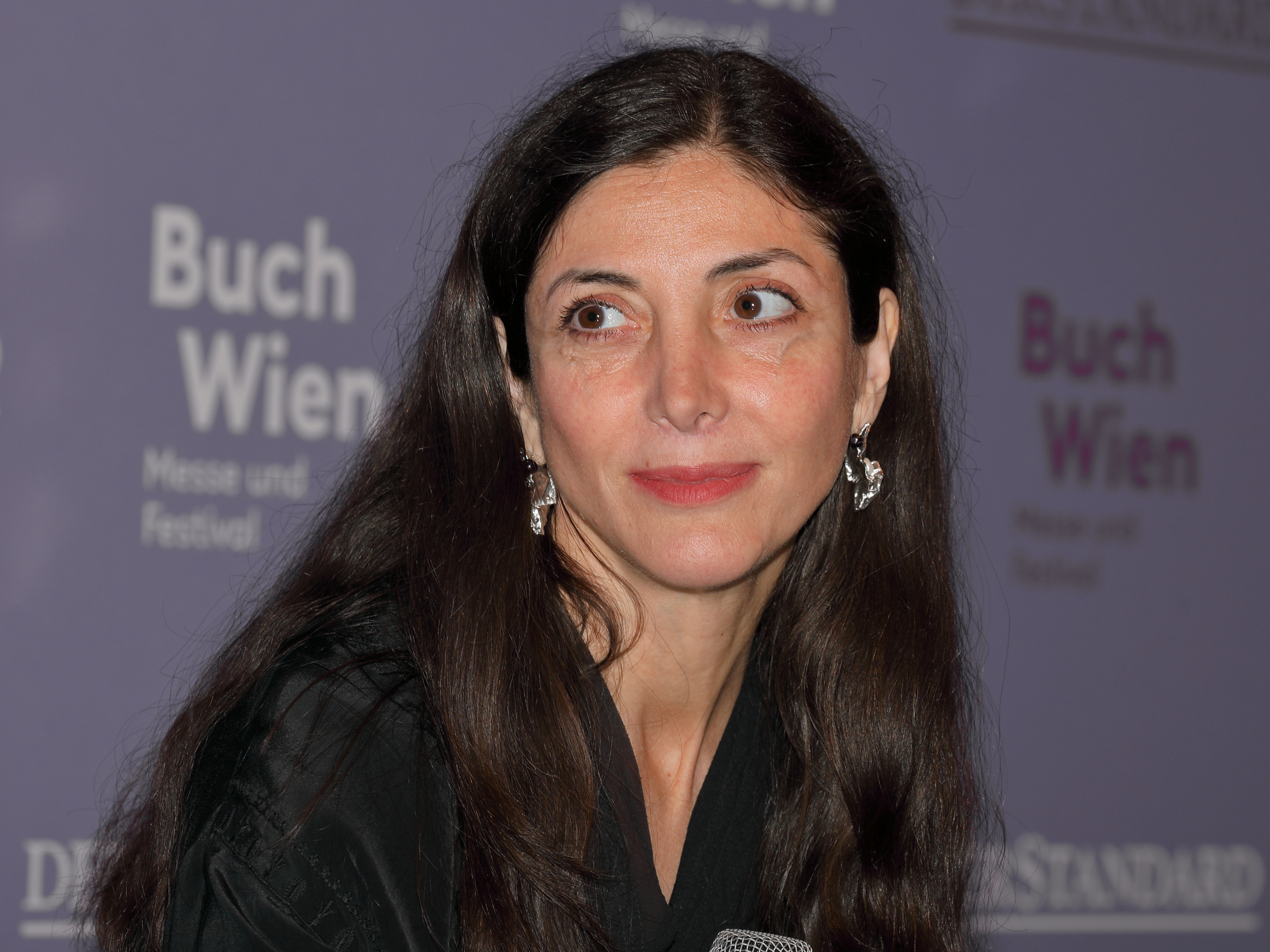

María Laura Espido Freire (her pen name is just her surnames Espido Freire) is a writer born in Bilbao, Spain on 16 July 1974. She is a recipient of the Premio Planeta de Novela.

== Biography ==
Espido Freire dedicated her early years to the study and performance of classical music. She received a degree in English philology from the University of Deusto, where she also studied for a master's degree in editing.

She made her literary debut with the novel Irlanda in 1998. It has been translated into several languages. The French version of the novel, translated by Eva Calveyra, won the Millepage Prize in France. As of 2007, an English translation of Irlanda is underway. The first chapter appeared in The Violet Issue of [Fairy Tale Review], edited by Kate Bernheimer. Another excerpt from the novel was published in the Summer 2007 issue of The Modern Review.

In 1999, she was awarded the Premio Planeta for her novel Melocotones helados. She is the youngest writer to have won this well-funded literary award.

Her novels have been translated into several languages, including French, German, Turkish, Dutch, Italian, Polish, Portuguese, Chinese and Japanese.

She has an interest in teaching creative writing and has taught at several universities.

In 2007, she won the Premio Ateneo de Sevilla for her novel Soria Moria.

It is also noteworthy that Espido Freire has been active in supporting animals rights and protection, as for instance she participated in the cycle of conferences which took place in the Parliament of Catalonia in order to abolish bullfighting.

== Works ==
=== Irlanda ===
Irlanda, published in 1998, is Espido Freire's debut novel. It tells the story of Natalia, a fifteen-year-old girl with a strong imagination. Natalia has two sisters one of whom, Sagrario, has recently died after a long illness.

=== Works in English ===
- Irlanda, Fairy Tale Review Press; 2011. ISBN 9780979995446

=== Novels ===
- Irlanda (Barcelona, Planeta, 1998).
- Donde siempre es octubre (Barcelona, Seix Barral, 1999).
- Melocotones helados (winner of Premio Planeta 1999; Barcelona, Planeta, 1999).
- Diabulus in musica (Barcelona, Planeta, 2001).
- Nos espera la noche (Madrid, Alfaguara, 2003).
- La diosa del pubis azul (Barcelona, Planeta, 2005). With Raúl del Pozo.
- Soria Moría (Sevilla, Algaida Editores, 2007).
- Hijos del fin del mundo: De Roncesvalles a Finisterre (winner of IV Premio Llanes de Viajes; (Madrid, Imagine Ediciones, 2009).
- La flor del Norte (Barcelona, 2011) ISBN 978-84-08-09951-2.
- Quería volar (Madrid, 2014) ISBN 978-84-34-41851-6.
- Para vos nací (Madrid, 2015) ISBN 978-84-34-41926-1.
