= José Antonio Labordeta =

Spanish singer-songwriter

The Most Excellent José Antonio Labordeta
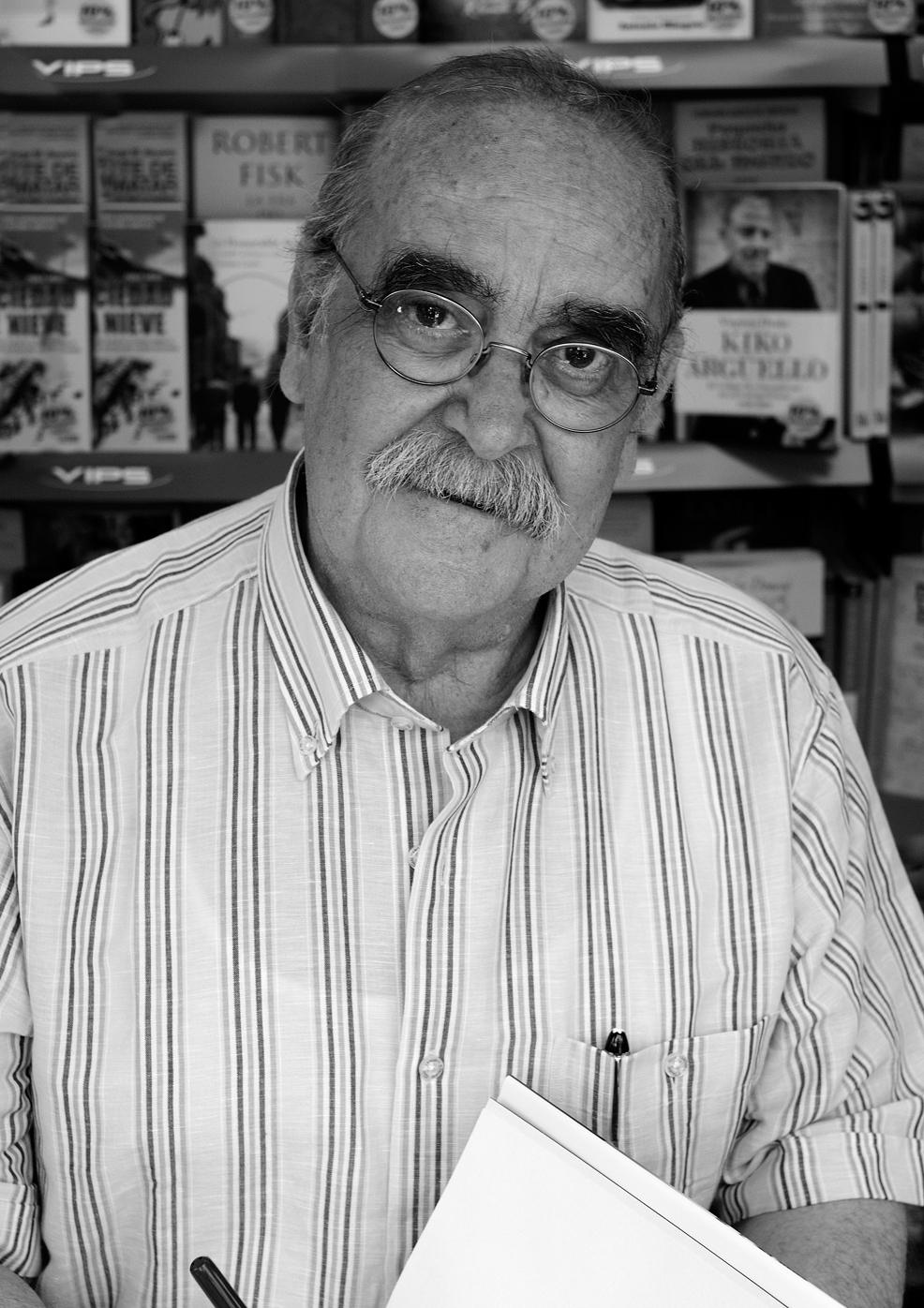
- Labordeta in 2009

Deputy in the Congress of Deputies
- In office 2000–2008
- Monarch: Juan Carlos I

Deputy in the Aragonese Corts
- In office 1999–2000
- Monarch: Juan Carlos I

Personal details
- Born: José Antonio Labordeta Subías; 10 March 1935 Zaragoza, Aragon, Spain
- Died: 19 September 2010 (aged 75) Zaragoza, Aragon, Spain
- Cause of death: Prostate cancer
- Party: Chunta Aragonesista
- Spouse: Juana de Grandes (1963–2010)
- Children: Ángela Labordeta de Grandes; Ana Labordeta de Grandes; Paula Labordeta de Grandes
- Parent: Miguel Labordeta Palacios
- Relatives: Miguel Labordeta
- Education: Universidad de Zaragoza
- Occupation: Politician, singer-songwriter, teacher, writer, television presenter and journalist
- Awards: Gold Medal of Merit in the Fine Arts (2008); Grand Cross of the Civil Order of Alfonso X, the Wise (2010)
- Genre: Poetry and protest song

José Antonio Labordeta Subías (10 March 1935 – 19 September 2010) was a Spanish Aragonese singer, songwriter, poet, writer and political activist. He was described by The Gran Enciclopedia Aragonesa (Great Aragonese Encyclopedia) as "The most important Aragonese singer-songwriter". He began singing in an attempt to give more relevance to his poetry; his songs are well-known and beloved anthems in Aragón. Poetic songs such as "Aragón", "Canto a la libertad" (Song for Freedom) or "Me dicen que no quieres" (They tell me you don't want to) also gained national popularity.

He was also the founder of the Andalán newspaper, which was very influential during the 1970s. From 2000 until retiring in 2008, he represented Zaragoza in the Spanish Congress for Chunta Aragonesista (Aragonese Union), an Aragonese political party.

== Biography ==
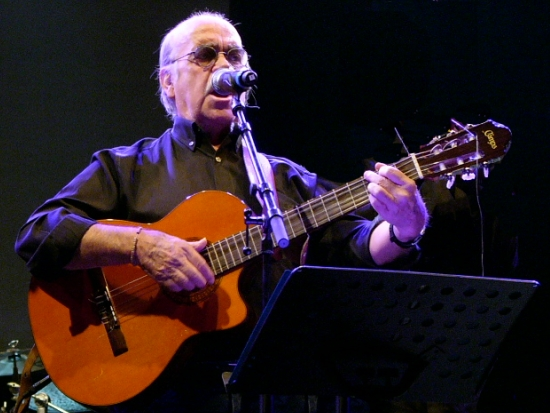
José Antonio Labordeta

José Antonio Labordeta was born in Zaragoza, Aragón, in 1935. In 1953, his father died. José Antonio went to live with his older brother Miguel, who was married and fourteen years his senior.

In 1963, Labordeta married Juana de Grandes, and the newly wed couple moved to Teruel. Two of their daughters, Ana and Ángela, were born while the couple was living there.

He died on 19 September 2010 in Zaragoza at age 75 after a long battle with prostate cancer.

== Discography ==
Title	Date of release
Los leñeros	1968
Cantar i Callar	1974
Tiempo de Espera	1975
Cantes de la tierra adentro	1976
Labordeta en directo	1977
Que no amanece por nada	1978
Crónicas de Paletonia	1978
Cantata para un país	1979
Método de Lectura	1980
Las cuatro estaciones	1981
Aragón en la mochila	1983
Qué queda de ti, qué queda de mí	1984
Aguantando el temporal	1985
Tú y yo y los demás	1987
Qué vamos a hacer	1987
Diario de un náufrago	1988
Trilce	1989
Canciones de amor	1993
Monegros	1994
Tierra sin mar	1995
Recuento	1995
Paisajes	1997
Nueva visión	1999
30 temas	2001
Con la voz a cuestas	2001
Cantar y no callar (1975–1995)	2004
Cantautores aragoneses	2006
Nueba cozina	2007
Cantautores aragoneses: el concierto!	2007

== Books ==
Title	Date of release	Notes
Sucede el pensamiento	1958	N/A
Las Sonatas	1965	N/A
Mediometro	1970	included in "Papeles de Son Armadans"
Cantar y callar	1971	N/A
Treinta y cinco veces uno	1972	N/A
Tribulatorio	1973	N/A
Cada cual que aprenda su juego	1974	N/A
Poemas y canciones	1976	N/A
Método de Lectura	1980	N/A
