= Teatros del Canal =

Performing arts centre in Madrid

Coordinates: 40.4383°N 3.7052°W

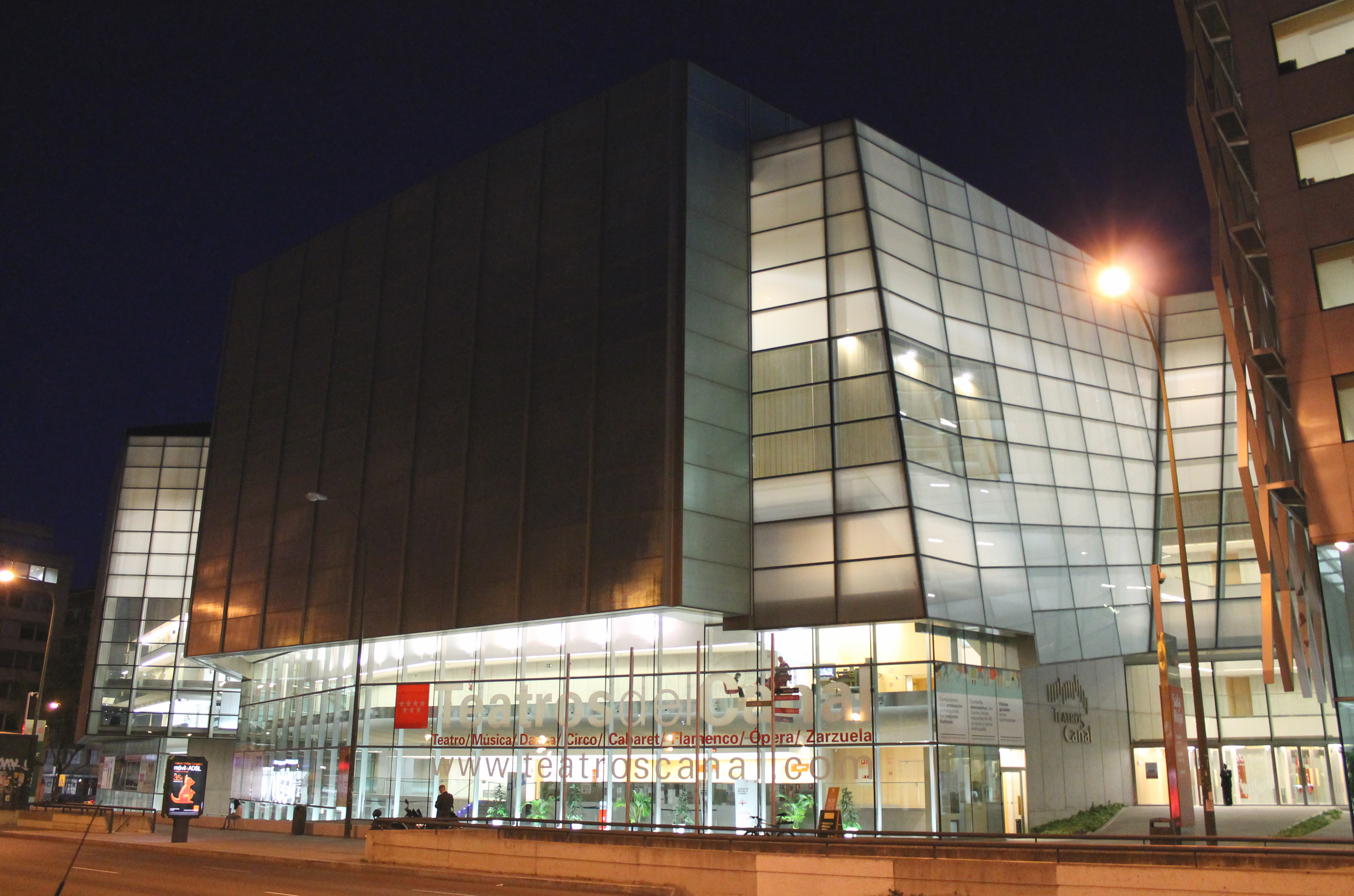
- Address: Calle de Cea Bermúdez 1, Chamberí, Madrid, Spain
- Owner: Madrid regional administration

Construction
- Opened: 20 February 2009
- Architect: Juan Navarro Baldeweg

The Teatros del Canal is a centre for performing arts located in Madrid owned by the Madrid regional administration.

Built on a plot formerly occupied by premises of Canal de Isabel II, the building was designed by Juan Navarro Baldeweg. After a 25% cost overrun, its total cost ended up amounting to about €100 million. It was opened to the public on 20 February 2009. The centre has been directed by Albert Boadella, Àlex Rigola, Natalia Álvarez Simó, and Blanca Li.
