= Miguel Labordeta =

Aragonese poet

Miguel Labordeta Subías (16 July 1921 - 1 August 1969) was an Aragonese poet. He was born in Zaragoza, Aragón, Spain. He held a Doctorate in History from the University of Madrid. His younger brother was the singer, writer and politician José Antonio Labordeta. He died on 1 August 1969 from a heart attack at the age of 48.

== Poetry ==
- (1948): Sumido 25
- (1949): Violento Idílico. Madrid, Clan Booksellers ("Cuadernos de Poesía", nº 8), published by Tomás Seral y Casas.
- (1950): Transeúnte central
- (1960): Memorándum. Poética Autología'. Zaragoza, ("Orejudín", nº 5).
- (1961): Epilírica, Bilbao, Alrededor de la Mesa (Comunicación Poética).
- (1967): Punto y aparte, Madrid, Ciencia Nueva ("El Bardo", nº 34).
- (1969): Los soliloquios, Zaragoza, Javalambre ("Fuendetodos", nº 1).
- (1972a): Obras Completas (Complete Works), with a prologue by José Antonio Labordeta, Javalambre ("Fuendetodos", nº 11).
- (1972b): Autopía, with a prologue by Rosendo Tello, Barcelona (El Bardo).
- (1975): La escasa merienda de los tigres y otros poemas, ed. de Pedro Vergés, Barcelona, Barral ("Ocnos", nº 50).
- (1981): Epilírica (Los nueve en punto), Barcelona, Lumen.
- (1983a): Metalírica, Madrid, Hiperión.
- (1983b): Obra completa (Complete Works), 3 books, Barcelona, El Bardo Collection.
- Luis, Leopoldo de, ed. (1969): Antología de la poesía social, Madrid, Taurus.

== Theatre ==
- (1955): Oficina de horizonte
