= Mapping of Venus =

Global surface of Venus

The mapping of Venus refers to the process and results of human description of the geological features of the planet Venus. It involves surface radar images of Venus, construction of geological maps, and the identification of stratigraphic units, volumes of rock with a similar age.

Satellite radar provides imagery of the surface morphology by using the physical properties of wave reflection. Long wavelength microwaves are used to penetrate the thick, cloudy atmosphere of Venus and reach to the surface. Different surface features reflect waves with different strengths of signal, producing images from which the maps are constructed.

After collection of the images of the Venusian surface, scientists started to map and identify different geologic materials and units according to distinctive surface features. Different groups of scientists analyzed different mapping areas, schemes and interpretation of features observed, to produce a classification of the units and comparison of their mapping.

== Overview ==
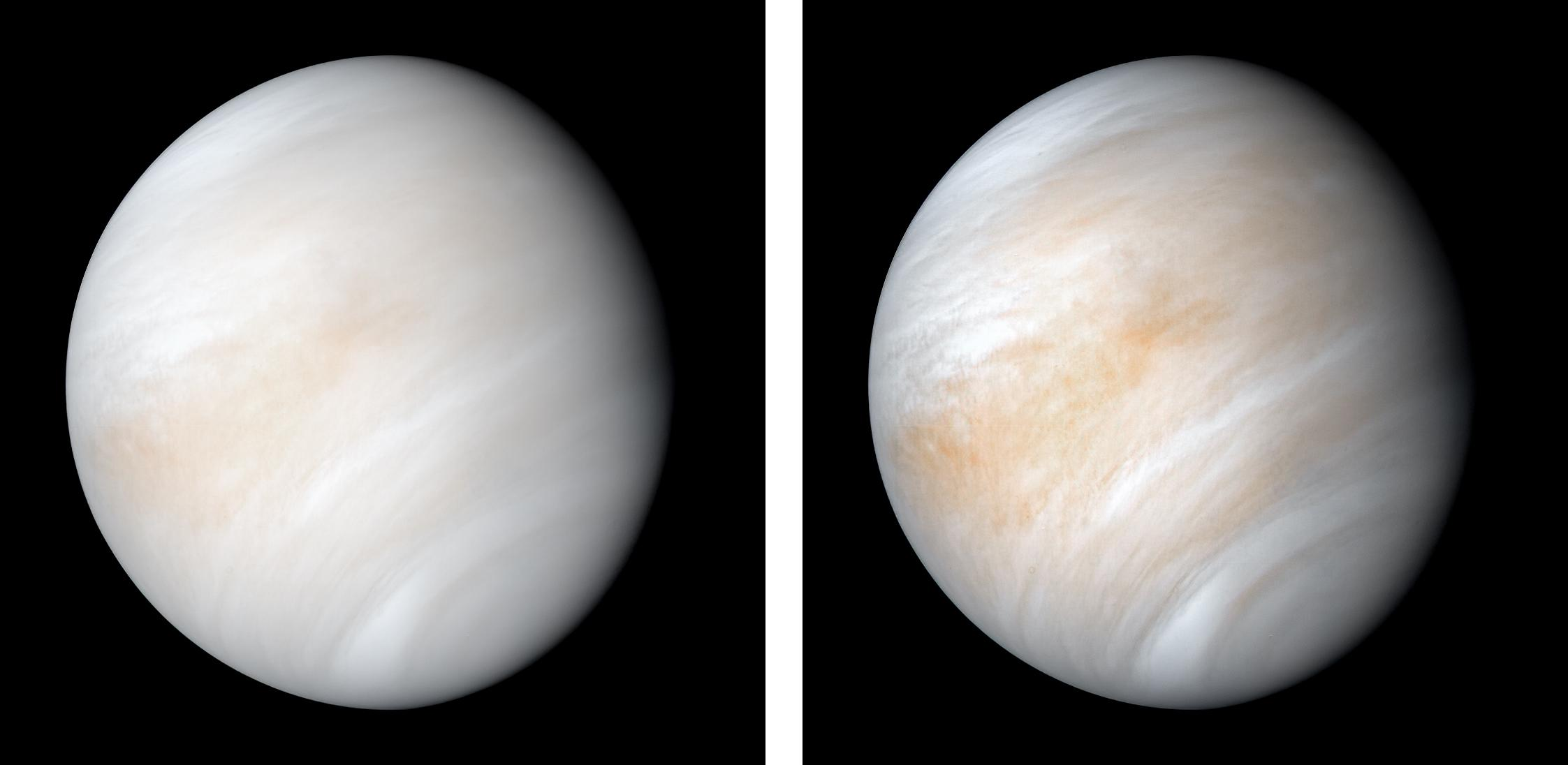
Venus in ultraviolet – old versus newly processed views (Mariner 10)

Before the development of radar-based observation, the thick yellow Venusian atmosphere hid surface features. In the 1920s, the first Venus ultraviolet project captured the thick atmosphere of Venus, but provided no information about the surface.

=== Venera program ===
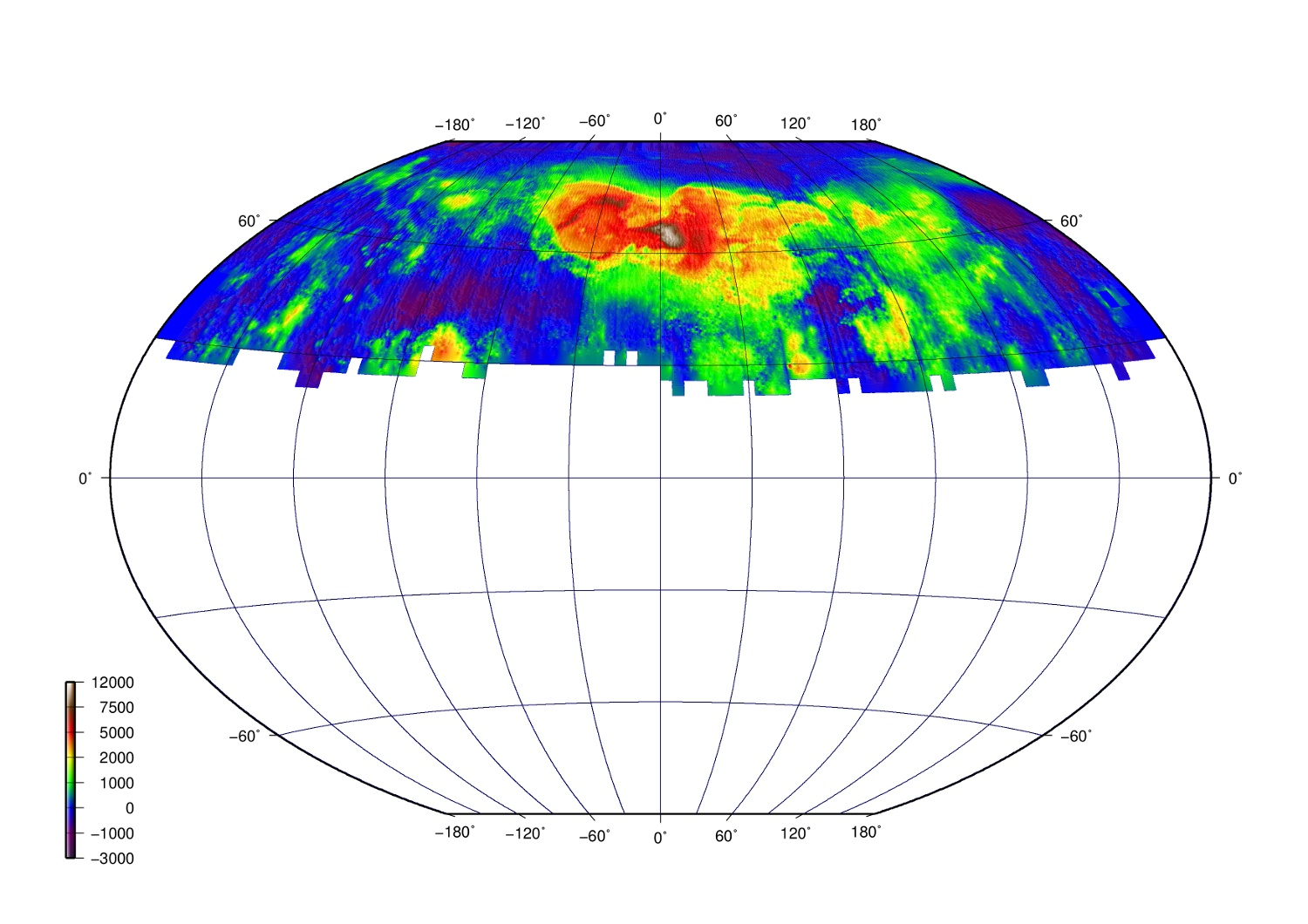
Venera 15/16 radar topography data

From 1961 to 1984, the Soviet Union developed the Venera probes for surface mapping by radar. The Venera 4 (on October 18, 1967) was the first lander to make a soft landing on Venus (also the first for another planetary object). The probe operated for about 23 minutes before being destroyed by the Venusian atmosphere. The Venera 15 and 16 orbiters returned radar topography images of part of the Venusian surface.

=== Magellan mission ===
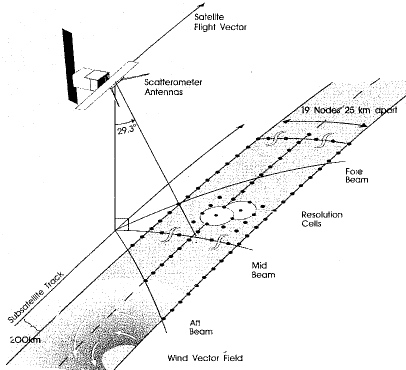
Synthetic Aperture Radar (showing right-looking in this diagram).

The global surface of Venus was fully mapped by the Magellan orbiter during 1990–1991 with 50 km spatial and 100 m vertical resolution. During three orbit regimes, the surface images were transmitted back to the Earth. These three orbiting motions of the spacecraft are called mapping cycle 1, 2 and 3.

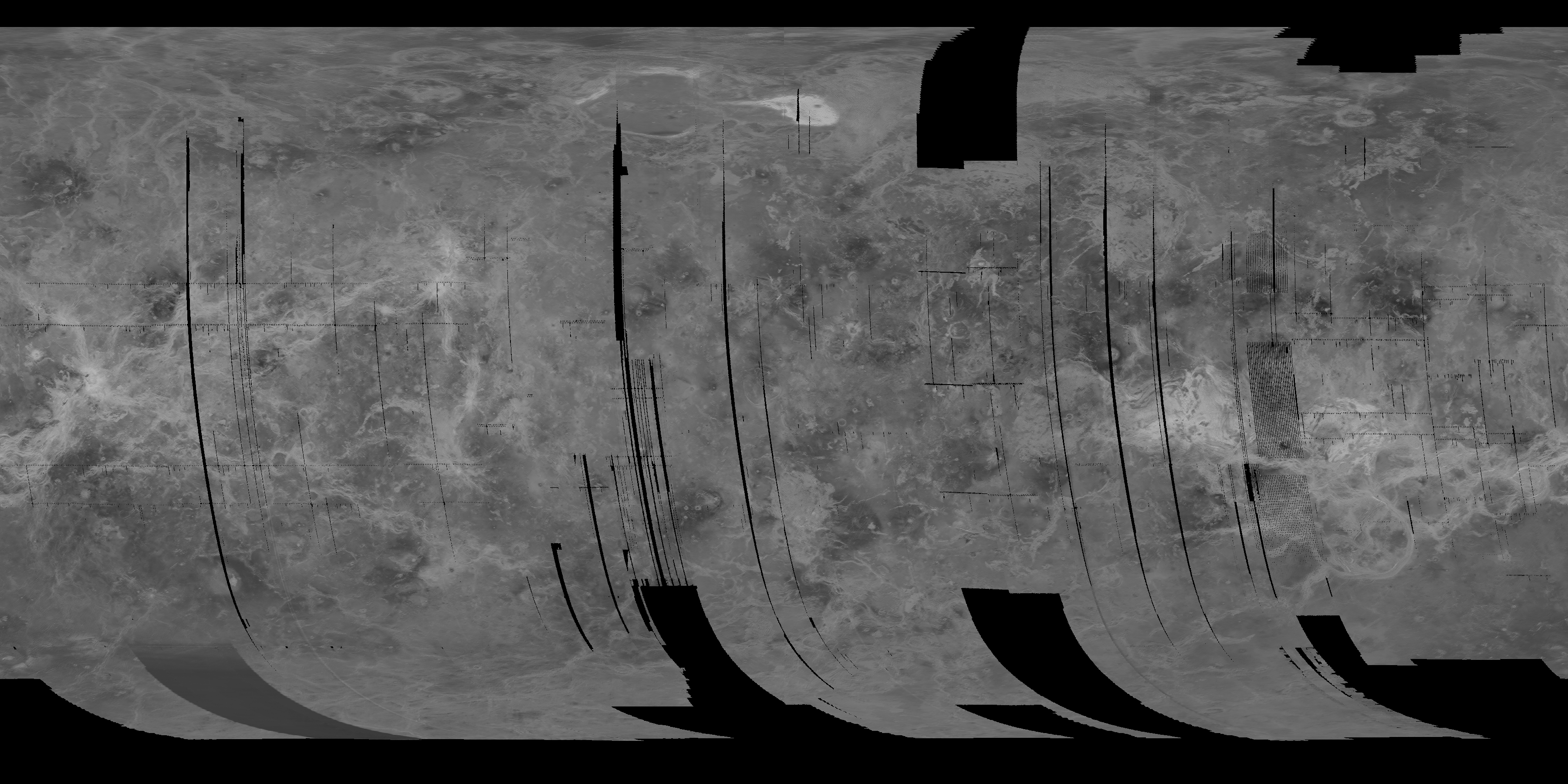
SAR image on Venus. This map is a mosaic of the "left-looking" data collected during cycle 1, produced by the USGS of the Magellan images.

During the mapping cycle 1 (left-looking) radar surface mapping on Venus (September 15, 1990 to May 15, 1991), around 70% of the Venusian surface was mapped by synthetic aperture radar. In cycle 2 (right-looking), 54.5% of the surface was mapped, mainly the south pole regions and gaps from cycle 1 during May 15, 1991 to January 14, 1992. Combining cycle 1 and 2 results in a total coverage of 96% of Venusian surface mapped. Cycle 3 (left looking) filled remaining gaps and collected stereo imagery of approximately 21.3% of the surface, increasing the total coverage to 98%.

=== Proposed future InSAR mapping ===
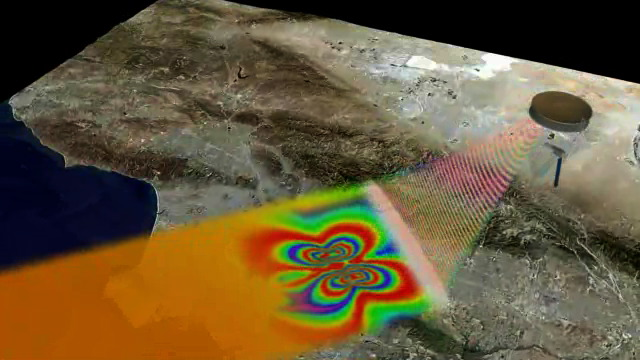
Hypothetical satellite using InSAR to measure small scale earthquakes

The use of Interferometric synthetic aperture radar (InSAR) for mapping Venus has been proposed.

Instead of surface mapping by SAR as done by previous missions, InSAR would measure the terrain motions during events such as earthquakes or tectonic movements. By performing the radar mapping at two separated times (before and after an event) over the same area, the terrain changes could be revealed.

== Mapping strategies ==
From the Magellan mission data, 3 types of images have been produced: (1) SAR images, (2) topographic images and (3) meter scale slope image.

=== SAR imaging ===
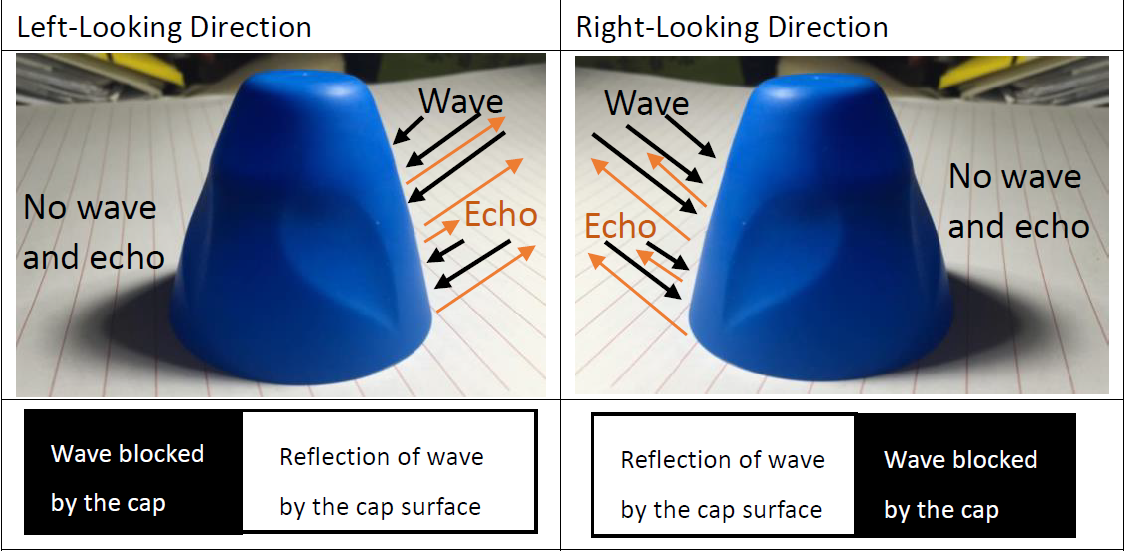
Real life example on difference in looking direction in SAR images. Same object with difference looking direction shows completely different result in SAR image.

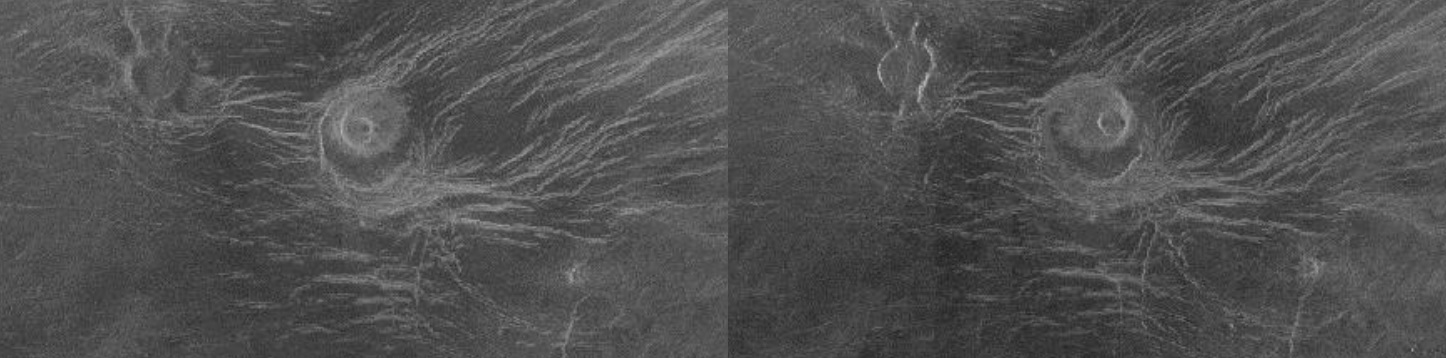
Left (left-looking) and right (right-looking) images showing the difference in SAR images on the same location on Venus. (Venus images extracted from USGS)

SAR images provide the highest resolution data set. Microwave radiation is used to penetrate the thick atmosphere and map the surface of Venus.

The SAR images are black and white images, which show the surface features using the intensity of radar return (echo), either due to surface roughness or orientation. For SAR imaging, spacecraft do not point directly downward (nadir) but slightly to the side—anywhere from about 10° to 45°. If the surface being mapped is smooth, the incident radar pulse will be reflected away from the spacecraft, resulting in a weak echo, which is represented by darker regions SAR images. On the other hand, if the surface is rougher, then more of the radar wave will be backscattered, and the intensity of echo will be stronger, which are represented by brighter areas in SAR images.

SAR images do not provide the color of surface, only the intensity of reflection of radar waves on the surface at a particular incidence angle. For example, when there is a light source shining on the blue cap on the left (left-looking), there will be shadows on the other side of the cap where light waves are blocked by the cap and no reflection occurs. If the looking direction is changed to the right, the shadowing (dark on SAR image) part will be at the opposite side.

The USGS Branch of Astrogeology has produced full resolution radar maps (also known as FMAPs) of Venus from the SAR data collected from the mission, called the Magellan F-BIDRs (Full resolution Basic Image Data Records). The maps have a coverage of around 92% (combination of the 2 left-looking cycles). The resolution is 75 m/pixel, which is the highest resolution Venusian map.

=== Topographic mapping ===
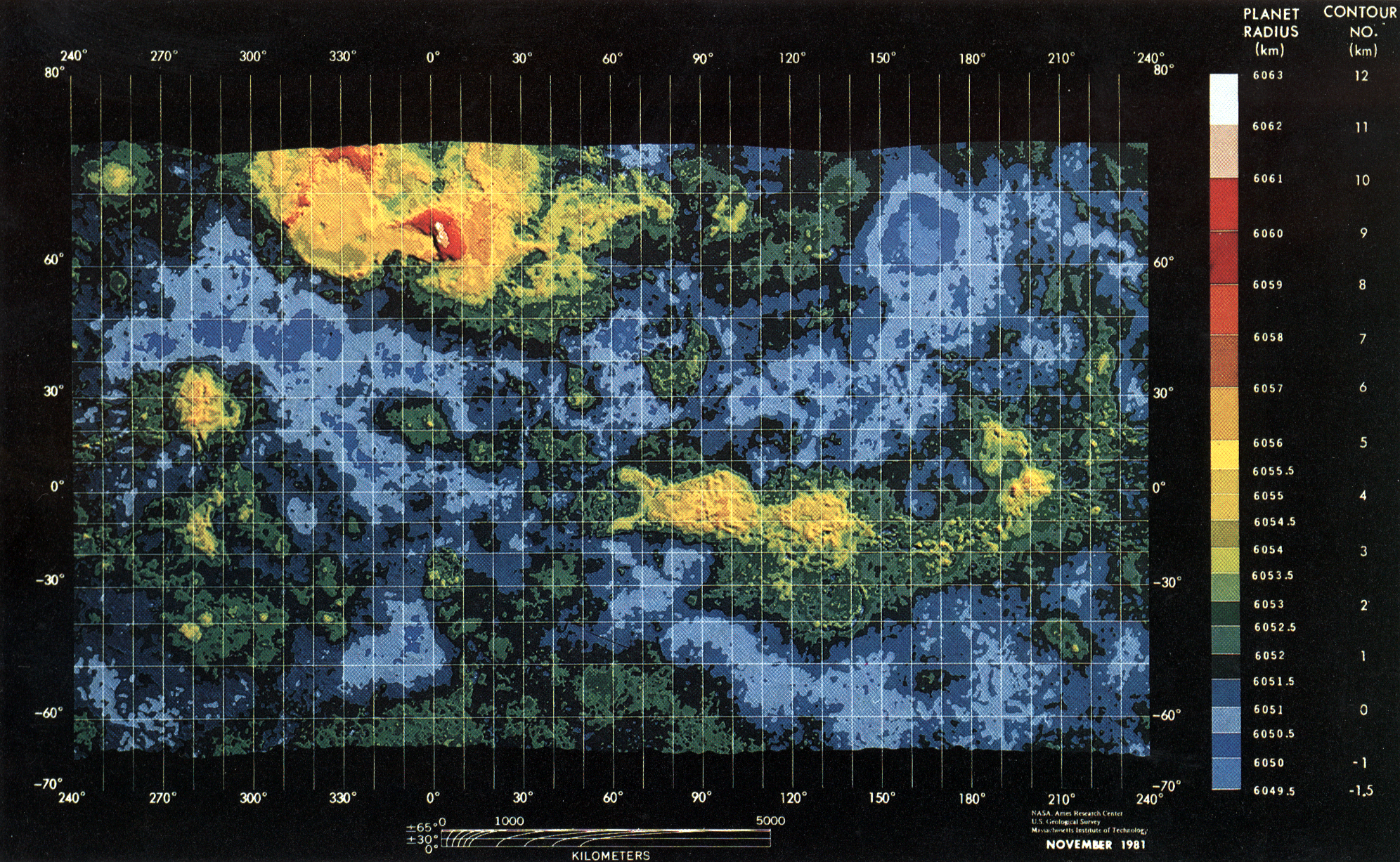
Topographic map of Venus from Pioneer Venus data (1981)

Topographic images were collected using radar altimetry. Compared to the SAR images, the topographic images have a significantly lower resolution of around 3–5 km/pixel. These images show lower elevations with darker pixels with higher elevations are shown with brighter pixels. Despite the low resolution, it is useful to study the regional feature of Venus, including initial evidence for the existence of rift zones.

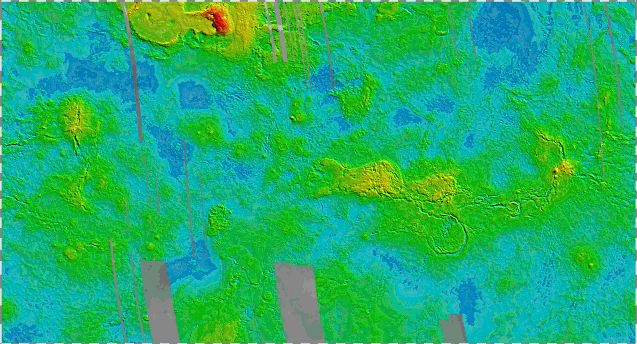
Topographic map of Venus from Magellan data

There are three types of topography on Venus

1. Highlands with elevation greater than 3 km, cover about 10% of the surface
2. Deposition plains with elevations around 0 to 2 km, cover more than 50% of the surface
3. Lowlands (accumulation of eroded highlands) with negative elevation, cover the rest of the surface

The surface observation includes impact craters, volcanoes, and lava flow channels, which give clues to estimate the surface age, possible global resurfacing events, tectonic activities, internal structure and surface processes.

== Unit classification and mapping schemes ==
Different missions have mapped different cartographic quadrangles of the surface of Venus. They applied different mapping schemes and came up with different classifications of Venusian units.

Here is a table comparing the different mapping scheme and unit identification by the Magellan science team (1994), Vicki L. Hansen (2005) and Mikhail A. Ivano and James W. Head (2011). The possible matching of the above units are in accordance with their radar backscatter and surface features.

Mapping Groups	Magellan Science Team (1994)	Mikhail A. Ivanov and James W. Head (2011)	Vicki L. Hansen (2005)
Mapping Scheme	Global-scale geologic mapping scheme (defined by difference in radar backscatter, surface texture and topographic)	Stratigraphic Classification Scheme (defined to global stratigraphy with a division of geologic time)	(defined by local formations and deformations, instead of global stratigraphic)
Unit Classification	Stratigraphic Units:	Stratigraphic Unit	
Unit Classification	(Tessera is not in this classification)	1. Tessera (t)	1. Tessera terrain; (Further classification into 7 types, according to the features in Hansen and Willis' paper in 1996)
Unit Classification	(Tessera is not in this classification)	2. Mountain belts (mb)	1. Tessera terrain; (Further classification into 7 types, according to the features in Hansen and Willis' paper in 1996)
Unit Classification	1. Lineated plains	3. Densely lineated plains (pdl)	2. Flow material from different origin locally
Unit Classification	2. Reticulate plains	4. Ridged plains (pr)	2. Flow material from different origin locally
Unit Classification	/	5. Regional plains (rp, upper and lower units)	2. Flow material from different origin locally
Unit Classification	3. Bright plains	/	2. Flow material from different origin locally
Unit Classification	4. Dark plains	6. Smooth plains (ps)	2. Flow material from different origin locally
Unit Classification	5. Mottled plains	7. Shield plains (psh)	2. Flow material from different origin locally
Unit Classification	5. Mottled plains	8. Shield clusters (sc)	2. Flow material from different origin locally
Unit Classification	6. Digitate plains (lava flow fields)	9. Lobate plains (pl)	2. Flow material from different origin locally
Unit Classification	Geomorphic units:	Structural features	
Unit Classification	1. Complex ridged terrain (CRT or tesserae)	(Tesserae is a geological material instead of structural features)	
Unit Classification	2. Ridged and fractured terrain	(Tesserae is a geological material instead of structural features)	
Unit Classification	3. Ridge belts (including mountain belts)	1. Groove belt (gb)	1. Secondary Structures
Unit Classification	4. Fracture belts	1. Groove belt (gb)	1. Secondary Structures
Unit Classification	/	2. Rift zones (rz)	1. Secondary Structures
Unit Classification	Deposits: Associated with impact events	Impact Crater Forming Materials	
Unit Classification	1. Crater material	1. Crater materials (c)	1. Crater material
Unit Classification	2. Bright diffuse deposits	2. Impact crater flow material (cf)	2. Flooded crater material
Unit Classification	3. Dark diffuse areas	2. Impact crater flow material (cf)	2. Flooded crater material

The details of the above mapping scheme and units will be discussed one by one below.

=== Geologic mapping scheme by the Magellan ===
The global-scale geologic mapping scheme by the Magellan science team was a very early mapping done by the Magellan mission (1990–1991). Instead of identifying different geological materials, it basically grouped the global surface units with different radar backscatter (white and dark in SAR images), topography and surface texture.

The mapped units and their characteristics are listed below.

==== Stratigraphic units ====
The stratigraphic units in this mapping scheme are classified as 6 types of plains:

Stratigraphic units
Units	Radar backscatter	Surface features	Interpreted geological materials
Lineated plains	Moderate and homogeneous	Abundant fractures, forming grids or orthogonal patterns	/
Reticulate plains	Intermediate and homogeneous	Abundant and low sinuous ridges	/
Dark plains	Homogeneous, dark local areas	Smooth	Lava flow
Bright plains	Homogeneous, bright local areas	/	Lava flooding with extension and rifting
Mottled plains	Extensive areas with both bright and dark materials	Mottled textures with abundant small shields and despoites	/
Digitate plains	Bright and dark deposites	In digitate patterns	Lava flow fields associated with coronae

==== Geomorphic units ====
The units are defined by groups of structural features of commonly higher elevation area with ridges and deformations:

Geomorphic units				
Units	Complex ridged terrain (CRT or tesserae)	Ridged and fractured terrain	Ridge belts	Fracture belts
Surface features	Ridges and fractures with deformations	Same as CRT, but with a single direction of deformations dominate	Linear, which parallel to the nearby ridges	Dense parallel linear fractures, mainly around equatorial and southern regions
Topography	Regional highland areas	Regional highland areas	Elevated ridges	/
Images	Aphrodite Terra, a complex terrain	Lineated terrain on Alpha Regio	Northern part of the Akna Montes (mountains) with a ridge belt.	Lineated plains

==== Deposits ====
The deposits are mainly the impact crater materials and its deposits:

Deposits
Units	Radar backscatter	Surface features	Image
Crater material	Impact ejecta (bright)	/	Mapping of Venus crater based on 3 units: (1) crater material; (2) radar-bright diffuse deposits; and (3) dark diffuse deposits
Bright diffuse deposits	Radar-bright materials	Forming "wispy patterns"	Mapping of Venus crater based on 3 units: (1) crater material; (2) radar-bright diffuse deposits; and (3) dark diffuse deposits
Dark diffuse deposits	Radar-dark materials	Parabola in shape	Mapping of Venus crater based on 3 units: (1) crater material; (2) radar-bright diffuse deposits; and (3) dark diffuse deposits

=== Stratigraphic classification scheme ===
One way to do mapping on Venus and characterization on the geological units on Venus is by the stratigraphic classification scheme. Mikhail A. Ivano and James W. Head (2011) mapped the area of geotraverses at 30°N and 0°N. They traced and discussed the global spatial distribution of rock-stratigraphic units and structure, and suggested their time correlation and geological history.

==== Stratigraphic units ====
This mapping scheme suggests that there are approximately 12 global stratigraphic units on Venus which are present on different quadrangles. These stratigraphic units and landforms are listed below in terms of mechanism from the oldest to the youngest.

===== Tectonic units =====
Tectonic units are formations due to large-scale crustal processes. In this mapping scheme, these surface units are grouped into possible same set of geological materials, shown by similar surface features.

====== Tessera regions (t) ======
Outline of tessera terrain imposed on the 'GIS Map of Venus'

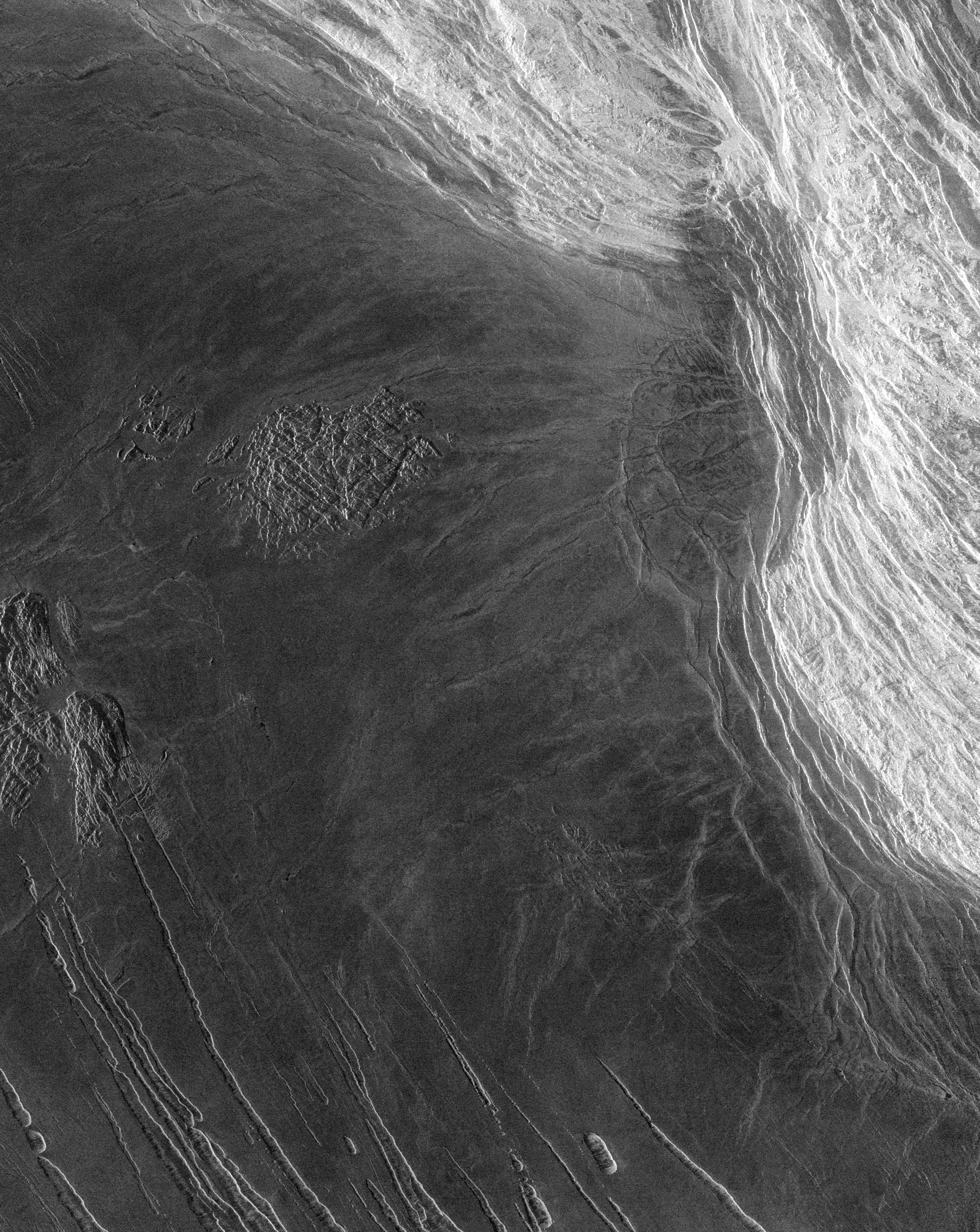
Maxwell Montes's tessera (t) terrain seen in appearing as white in SAR image

Tesserae are regions of heavily deformed terrain, mostly located on highland areas (greater than 2 km in elevation) on Venus. This tectonic feature -or uni— is thought to be the oldest material on Venusian surface with highest level of tectonic deformation. It is of high topography and seen in white on the SAR images with high radar backscatter. The materials composed tessa terrain, which was named as unit Tt in the mapping of V-17(Basilevsky, A. T.,1996).

The intersecting of material and tectonic structures are the defined characteristic of tessera, but the sets are not always seen in the images. Due to the heavy tectonic deformation, it contains both contractional features of ridges and extensional features of graben and fractures.

The boundaries of tessera shows embayment by other materials of other units. By this cross-cutting relationship, it provides evidence of tessera being the oldest unit within the strata.

====== Densely lineated plains ======
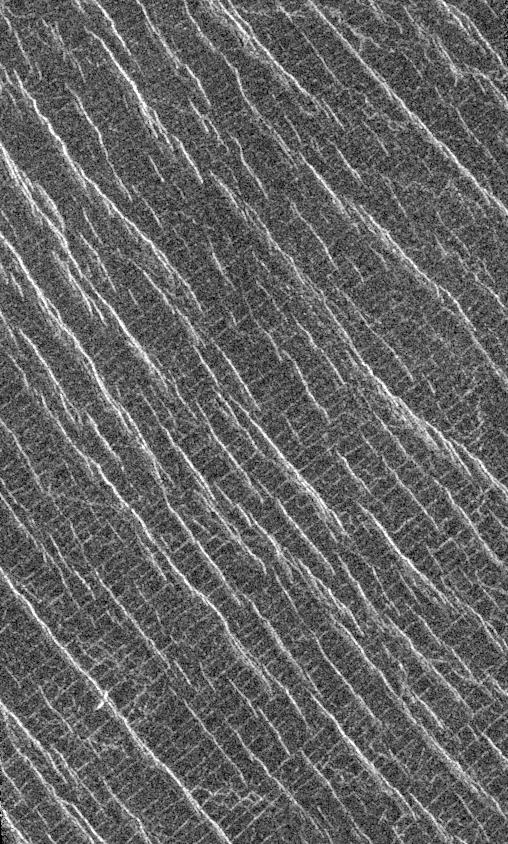
Densely lineated plains (pdl) on Venus

The densely lineated plains unit (pdl) is defined by the dense and parallel lineaments packed on the unit. They make up a small area on Venus's global surface of around 720 million km^{2}. The lineament is the pattern of deformation, which make it a typical structural–material unit.

There is evidence showing the embayment of tessera by pdl's material in some tessera margins. Thus, it is possible that this unit is younger than the tessera unit.

In SAR images, it also shows a high backscatter imagery, but lighter than that of tessera.

====== Ridged plains (pr) ======
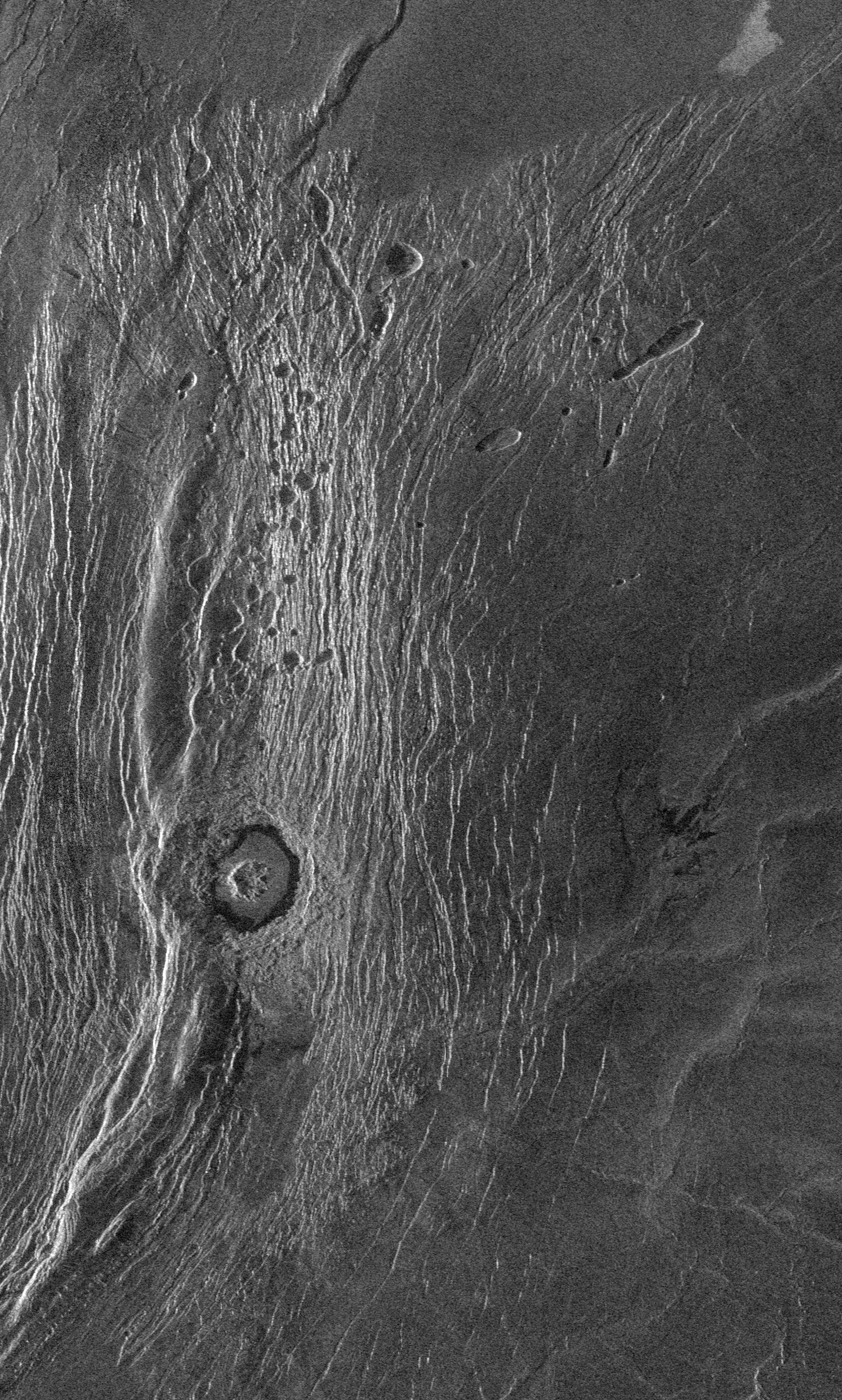
The ridge belt that forms in the western part of the elevated smooth plateau of Lakshmi plain

The ridged plains unit are lava plains deformed by ridges. They have a smooth surface with relatively higher elevation than the surroundings. The ridges are usually symmetrical in cross-section and collected into prominent belts.

There is evidence in places showing that pr unit is embaying the t and pdl unit. Also, the deformation of pr took place after the formation of t and pdl units. Thus, pr unit is possibly younger than both unit t and pdl. As most of the deformation features on pr is far away from that on t and pdl units, it is difficult to tell the age relationship of deformation directly. However, there are some tessera-like deformations additional to the ridge belts, it suggests there are some possible overlapping of formation time in unit t and pr.

In SAR images, pr units have noticeably higher radar backscatter than surrounding regional plains, but lower than tessera (t) and densely lineated plains (pdl) units. Ridges planes have older ages compared to surrounding regional plains (pr) due to the difference in radar albedo and embayment relationships suggested by McGill and Campbell (2006).

The major occurrence of this unit is located among Vinmara, Atalanta, Ganiki, and Vellamo Planitiae, in a broad fan-shape, and also appears between Ovda and Thetis Regiones and in the southern hemisphere within Lavinia Planitis.

Some researchers mapped ridges of the pr unit as deformed structures instead of a unit.

====== Mountain belts (mb) ======
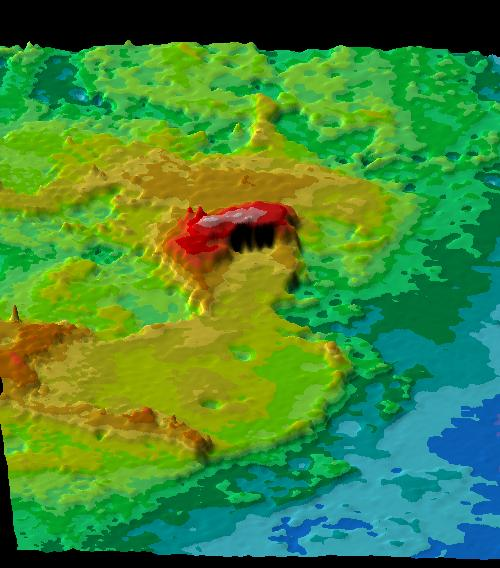
Perspective view of Ishtar Terra showing the mountain belt (mb) units with Akna Montes and Freyja Montes along the western and northwestern edge of Lakshmi Planum, and Maxwell Montes along its eastern edge

The mountain belts unit is the only real mountain range on Venus in the area surrounding Lakshmi Planum, which covers only 1.3 million km^{2} of the Venusian global surface, while involves structural deformation of different materials in their formation. There are in total four major mountain belts mapped on Venus, including the belts of Danu Montes, Akna Montes, Freyje Montes and Maxwell Montes (the highest mountain on Venus with elevation of around 12 km).

When looking at the cross-cutting relationship, the inner ridges of the belts seems to be embayed by the material of regional plains (pr), which covered the plateau surface. There is later deformation in terms of tilting towards the belts and wrinkle ridges parallel to the belt. It suggested formation formed right before the deposition of regional plains and later deformation of the belts.

====== Shield plains ======
Formation of Shield Domes.

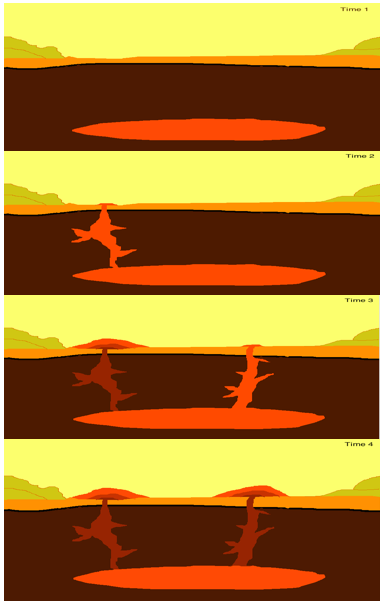
Accruva Formation. Evaluation Diagram of Shield plain formation from Shield Domes over time

The shield plains units (psh) refers to plains with volcanic edifices of shield-like features. In most of the psh regions. the plains are concentrated and forms a group. It is the oldest unit in the strata showing no widespread deformation, in which only little tectonic deformation is observed, such as ridges and fractures. Compared to the above units, this unit seems to cover a high proportion of the Venusian surface at around 79.3 million km^{2}. Although the distribution of psh is widely spread and homogeneous, there are also some regions with no psh units, including the Lakshmi Planum and some lowland of regional plains, The shield plains are formed from shield domes over time and suggested that psh may be associated as volcanic plains with small sources of volcanic materials and mildly deformed by tectonics.

There are embayment relationships, showing that this unit is younger than the above highly tectonized units (t and pdl) at a global scale. However, the absence of the unit in some regions makes this unit difficult to fit into the strata, especially between the highly tectonized units mentioned above, and regional plains which will be mentioned in the next section.

In SAR images, the psh unit shows a higher radar backscatter compared to surrounding overlaying regional plains, still lower than units of t, pdl and pr.

====== Regional plains (rp) ======
The regional plains unit (rp) is the most widespread unit on the Venusian surface of about 182.8 million km^{2}. It is defined as smooth and homogeneous plains, which are deformed into networks of linear subparallel or intersecting ridges. This unit is interpreted as having volcanic origin with deformation of wrinkle ridges superimposed. However, the source of volcanism is not obvious in the Magellan data.

Regional plains are divided into abundant lower unit (rp_{1}, Rusalka Formation) with smooth surface and relatively low radar backscatter and upper unit (rp_{2}, Ituana Formation) with also smooth surface, but higher radar albedo. Wrinkle ridges heavily deform the lower unit while moderately deforming the upper unit. The lower unit is heavily tectonized and embayed by lava plains and flows. The younger upper unit is lacking in large heavily tectonized tessera regions.

In SAR images, they show as an intermediate level of radar backscatter.

====== Shield clusters ======
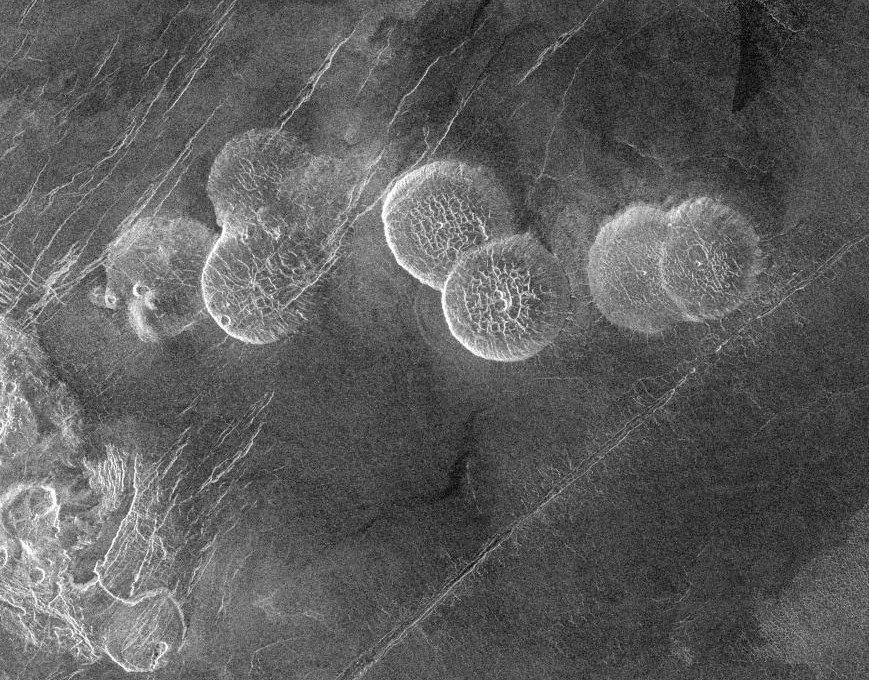
Volcanic Domes on Venus

The Shield clusters unit (sc) is similar to shield plains, but tectonically undeformed. Based on the analysis by Crumpler and Aubele (2000), 10% of this unit shows evidence that it is younger than regional plains (rp). Some of the small shield clusters are founded embaying the regional plains of both lower and upper layers, while in some regions, this unit is found on top of the rp unit and deformed together by wrinkled ridges.

====== Smooth plains ======
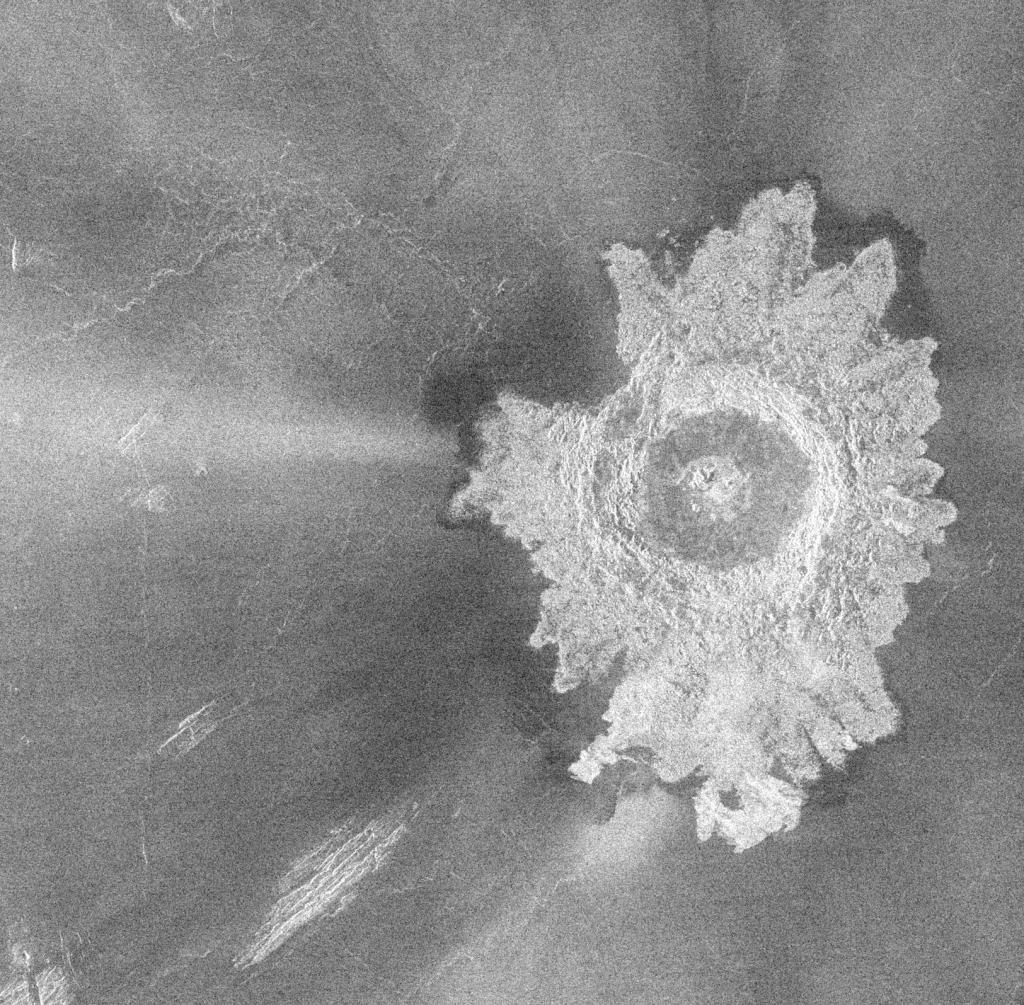
Adivar crater. Dark (Smooth plain) deposition around the crater

The Smooth plains unit (ps) belongs to Gunda Formation, which is a smooth and featureless surface without tectonic marks. It only makes up about 10.3 million km^{2} of Venusian surface. These plains are usually do not have impact craters, which is tectonic undeformed. These plains are rarely with low domes. These suggested three type of setting for this unit:

(1) Many fields of smooth plains are near to the regions with young volcanism (such as Bell Regio) with the lobate plains (pl). However, the relationship of smooth and lobate plains is uncertain.

(2) Some of the unit is located as deposition around an impact crater, possibly associated with the impact events.

(3) small ps units are inside the tessera regions (such as Ovda Regio), which may associate with a volcanic origin,

Due to the usual higher elevation of smooth plains, it is possible that the volcanic material of smooth plains is a younger unit.

====== Lobate plains ======
The Lobate plains unit (pl) is a smooth surface crossed with some extension features associated with rift zones. These features make up to around 37.8 million km^{2}, which is significant. The origin of lobate plains is thought to be associated with large volcanoes, which sometimes appear with large dome-shaped rises. One possible origin of this unit is from massive and multiple eruptions from large and localized volcanoes with little later extensional deformation.

By cross-cutting relationships, the plains embay the wrinkle ridges containing regional plains, which suggested that lobate plains are younger. However, as the lobate plains, smooth plains, shield cluster and rift zones are often seen as small fractures, it is difficult to tell their time relationship.

The SAR image shows uneven radar back-scatter flow-like pattern.

===== Structural Units =====
Structural units are formed due to deformation. The resultant properties depend on the stress applied to the formation and the stain of the rocks.

====== Tessera-forming structures (ridges and grooves) ======
Ridge structures are mainly discussed in the ridged plains (pr) part above.

Groove belts (gb) belong to the Agrona Formation, which refers to dense extensional structures. This unit appears to be sets of subparallel lineaments of fractures or grabens. This deformation unit makes up to around 37.1 million km^{2} of the Venusian surface. These fractures are the most obvious and are very abundant on the surface of Venus, and crosses different units on the surface. It appears to be a younger unit on the surface. However, some vast plains units are found embaying the grooves in some areas. It suggests the formation of gb unit before the formation of plains.

The major difference between grooves unit and dense lineated plains are that the former is belt-like and the latter is patch-like.

It is very important to map these fractures, as sometimes the rock unit may be too deformed and is not recognizable, which it can be mapped as "fractured plains materials" according to the guidelines of Wilhelms (1990).

In SAR image, these fractures are of high radar albedo, as high as that of the tessera unit.

====== Rift zones ======
The Rift zones unit (rz) belongs to the Devana Formation, which is also made up of dense extensional structures with defined numbers of fissures and troughs containing flat-floors.

It is found that the rift zones are usually related to the lobate plains, which may indicate that the rifting is related to the young volcanism and also young volcanic plains formed.

===== Impact Crater Forming Materials =====
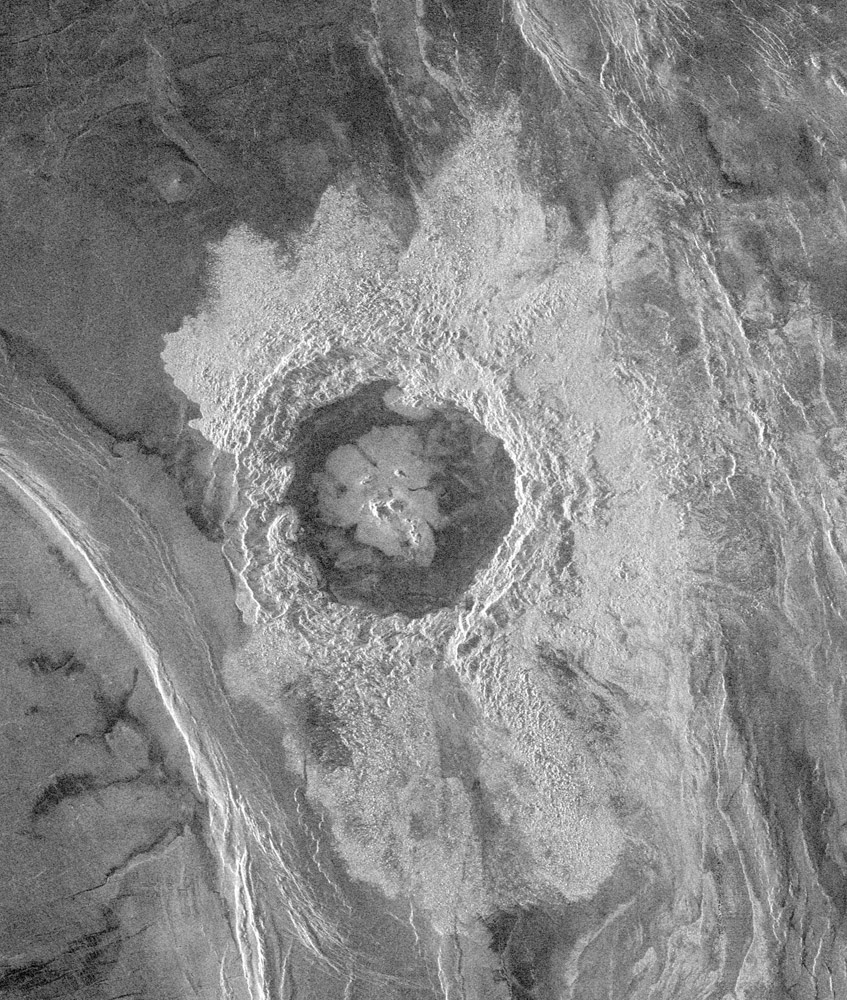
Dickinson Crater on Venus. The structure can be clearly seen.

Just like the impact craters on Earth and other terrestrial planetary bodies, impact craters on Venus include central peaks, rims, floors, walls, ejected deposits and outflows from the craters. There are two groups of materials, including undivided crater materials (c) and impact crater flow material (cf).

The study of impact craters on Venus is important to discover its geological history. In testing the model of catastrophic and equilibrium Model (another hypothesis other than global stratigraphy) on Venus, it is found that the older regional plains (rp) are embaying only around 3% of the impact craters and the younger lobate plains (pl) are embaying around 33% of the impact crater on Venus. It suggested that there are likely to have been at least two geological periods on Venus:

(1) Earlier global volcanic regime stage (Formation of older regional plains), when the high rate of volcanic activities overwrote the marks of impact cratering

(2) Later network-rifting and volcanic regime stage (Formation of younger lobate plains), when the intensity of volcanism is reduced and allowed more impact cratering to be left on the surface.

Thus, the studying of crater distribution and randomness may give clues for Venusian geological history.

==== Global stratigraphy ====
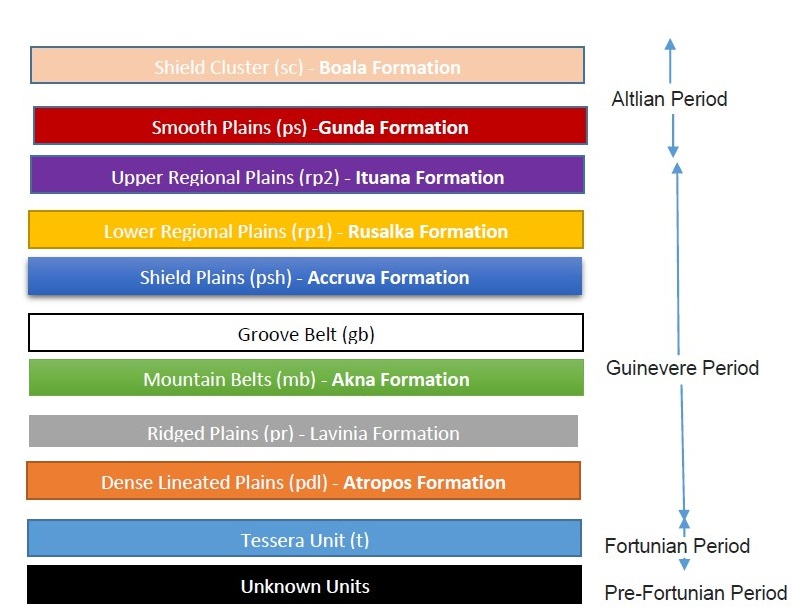
A simple Venus global strata base on Ivanov and Head's model (2011) (Note that it is just a simple global strata, not every region on Venus has this strata.)

Under the Global stratigraphic Classification Scheme, by correlating the units mentioned above (Mikhail A. Ivano and James W. Head, 2011), the researchers suggested three phases of Venusian geological history:

(1) The earliest period, Fortunian Period, involved intensive formation of tessera (t) (building of thick crust at the same time).

(2) Then, it came to Guinevere Period, which firstly, there was formation of Atropos (dense lineated plains, pdl), Lavinia (Ridged plains, pr), Akna (Mountain belts, mb), and Agrona (groove belt, gb). Later, there was global emplacement of Accruva (shied plains, psh), Rusalka (lower regional plains, rp1), and Ituana (upper regional plains, rp2) Formations. There are events of wrinkle ridges formed around the global. Mostly of the surface of Venus was resurfaced in this period

(3) In the Altlian period, there are limited formations of smooth plains (ps), Gunda Formation, and shield clusters (sc), Boala Formation, possibly due to Atlian volcanism. There was significant reduction in the rate of volcanism and tectonism. However, these proposed events, and formation of units are not yet fully explained by a complete Venus geological model, such as resurfacing of Venus or heat-pipe hypothesis.

=== The mapping scheme by Vicki L. Hansen (2005) ===
The mapping scheme applied by Vicki L. Hansen is mainly regional based, instead of using global stratigraphy as Mikhail A. Ivano and James W. Head did. This mapping scheme focuses on the regional origin of geological materials.

==== Tectonic units ====
There are only two major units classified under this group. These two units are further classified below:

===== Tessera Terrain =====
Tessera terrain is seen locally the oldest unit on Venus.

It can be further classified into eight groups according to the deformation features:

1. Fold Terrain
2. "Lava Flow" Terrain
3. S-C Terrain
4. Extended Fold Terrain
5. Folded Ribbon Terrain
6. Basin-and-Dome Terrain
7. "Star" Terrain
8. Tessera Inliers

Some of the terrains have multiple deformations, but it is not essential for them to have complex deformation.

===== Flow materials with different origins =====
The relatively low-lying plains are mapped as flows from different origins locally. These materials are thought to be thick young sediments deposited rapidly. In SAR images, the flows material can be radar-dark or bright.

==== Structural features ====
Structural deformation is treated as a feature instead of a unit.

There are some common features mapped, such as linear fractures, ridge and wrinkled ridge identified in many regions, and other local features only found in some regions, such as dome, belt fractures, ribbon, graben, etc.

==== Impact crater-forming materials ====
The classification of impact crater-forming materials are (1) crater materials and (2) flooded crater materials, which is similar to the stratigraphic classification scheme.

== Differences between mapping schemes ==
Here are some differences on the terminology and classification of units:

1. The term "complex ridged terrain (CRT or tesserae)"
2. Treating tessera terrain as a global stratigraphic unit
3. Terminology and classification of "plains"

=== The terminology of "complex ridged terrain (CRT or tesserae)" ===
Hansen (2005) suggested that the tessera terrain should not be named as "complex ridged terrain (CRT)". For the term "complex ridged terrain (CRT)" used by the Magellan science team (1994), it carries confusions. Ridges can be also understood as fold, which is a contractional feature. However, not all tessera deformation are due to contraction.

=== Treating tessera terrain as a global stratigraphic unit ===
For treating tessera terrain as the oldest global unit in the Stratigraphic Classification Scheme, it is questioned under Hansen (2005)'s mapping scheme. Although it is commonly the oldest unit mapped in different Venusian areas, it may not be the case for everywhere. The assumption of all the tessera are formed at the same time and the oldest around the global are remained untested.

=== Terminology and classification of "plains" ===
There are a major difference in terminology between the Stratigraphic Classification Scheme and Hansen (2005)'s mapping scheme, which Hansen (2005) suggested that "fold material" should be used instead of "plains with different surface features". It can be explained by three reasons:

1. "Plains" is not used to describe geological material, but surface physical features.
2. Also, according to fundamental geological mapping principles, secondary structure (such as lineated, ridged and wrinkled) should not be used to define geological units.
3. There is no evidence that the Venusian plains are volcanic products resulted from extensive flood lava

Thus, in Hansen's mapping scheme (2005), plains are defined as flow from different local origins in regional mapping.

== Quadrangles' mapping of Venusian geological units ==
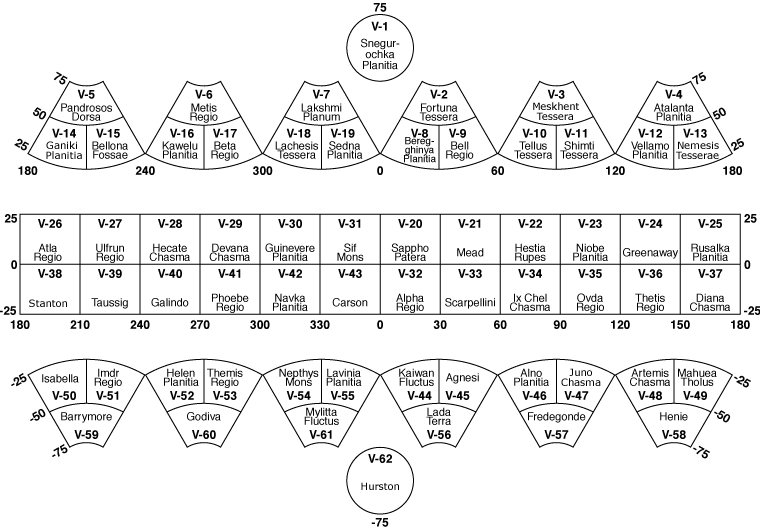
Quadrangles on Venus

The quadrangles mapping and classification of geological units by different groups of researchers are mainly based on regional units mapped locally. Different groups have their own grouping of units, which are not fully coherent with others work and the proposed global stratigraphy. Also, there are some regional features being classified regionally.

=== Cartography ===
The United States Geological Survey defines sixty-two cartographic quadrangles for the surface of Venus, with V-1 as the north pole region and V-62 as the south pole region. Base on the FMAPs, different groups of Venus researchers are mapping different quadrangles for the surface of Venus, resulting in different type of units defined.

Here are some examples of quadrangle mapping and their ways of classifying and grouping observed geological units. Some of them are having a similar time sequence as the global stratigraphy mentioned above and will be highlighted below.

==== Examples of quadrangle mapping unit classification ====
Here are the list of examples comparing the mapping schemes and units in quadrangles (regional mapping):

Quadrangles	Mapping group & year of publication	Mapping scheme	Stratigraphic units identified	Structural units mapped	Other information
V-5 Barrymore Quadrangle Mapping	Elizabeth Rosenberg and George E. McGill, 2001	Similar to the global stratigraphic mapping scheme with the oldest tessera, followed by dense lineated materials, up to other younger plains materials.	Plains materials (p, local plains and regional plains of different features); Flow materials (f); Corona materials (co); Linear belts (bl); Dense lineated materials (ld); Tessera materials (t); Impact crater materials (c)	Linear belts; Wrinkle ridges; Radar-bright; Linear features; Coronae; Corona-like features	/
V-13 Nemesis tesserae quadrangle mapping	Mikhail A. Ivanov and James E. Head, 2005	Global stratigraphy units classification	Plains materials of dense lineated plains (pdl), ridged and grooved plains (prg), shield plains (psh), wrinkle ridged plains (pwr) and smooth plains (ps); Tessera material of tessera unit (t); Crater material of undivided crater materials (c) and impact crater flow material (cf)	/	/
V-35 Ovda Regio quadrangle mapping Ovda Regio in V-35	Leslie F. Bleamaster, III, and Vicki L. Hansen, 2005	Mapping by grouping local formations and deformations, instead of global stratigraphic	Western regions (mainly flow materials with different origin and Ovda Regio tessera terrain ); Northeastern region (mainly flow materials with different origin and tessera terrain of Thetis Regio and undivided part); South-central to southeastern region (mainly flow materials with different origin and Boszorkany Dorsa basal material); Widespread units (Chasmata flow material, crater material, flooded crater material and tessera inlier terrain)	/	Regionally, the tessera unit are also the oldest unit with younger flows embaying it.
V-48 Artemis Chasma quadrangle mapping	Roger A.Bannister and Vicki L.Hansen, 2010	Mapping by grouping local formations and deformations, instead of global stratigraphic	Crater materials (c); Flow and shield materials (f); Tectonic and fracture terrain units (fr, t); Radar unit (rf)	/	Tectonic and fracture terrain units is the oldest unit as it is mainly the tessera unit.; All crater material and radar unit forms throughout the whole time period.; The area reflects a lot of radar signals from deeper layers, and it does not represent single geological units.

==== Examples of regional geological mapping ====
Here is an example of geological map in quadrangle V-20. The units are classified as (1) tessera material, (2) plains materials, (3) materials of coronae and (4) materials of domes and miscellaneous flows, with structures like ridges, wrinkle ridge and lineations.

Geological map of V-20	Original SAR image of V-20
V-20 Venus geologic map	Irnini Mons on Venus (V-20)
