= Equidimensional =

Equidimensional may refer to:

- Equidimensional (geology), used to describe the shape of three-dimensional objects
- Equidimensionality, property of a space that the local dimension is the same everywhere
