= Accruva Formation =

Geologic formation on Venus

The Accruva Formation is one of multiple geologic units found on Venus. Abbreviated psh, it is also known as shield plains due to the shield like structures formed in its region. It is characterized by its abundant clusters of small shield dome structures located throughout the unit and lack of pervasive tectonic deformation. The domes that characterize the unit are likely volcanic edifices, the result of multiple small volcanic eruptions over an extended period of time. It formed during the second half of the Guineverian Period, in which vast plains formed globally on Venus. It is one of 14 formations identified by Mikhail A. Ivanov and James W. Head.

== Description ==
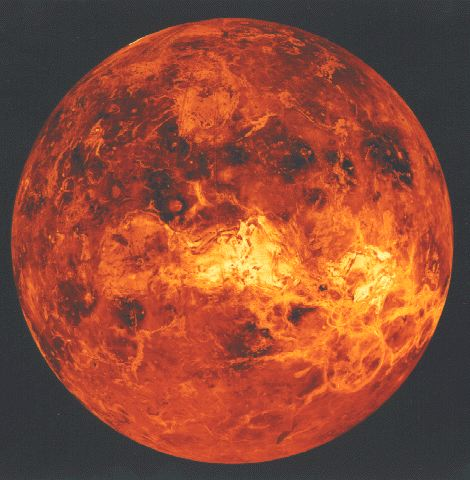
The planet Venus, where the Accruva Formation is located. Most of the Accruva Formation is located on the Northern half of the hemisphere. Image from Wikimedia

The Accruva Formation is also known as shield plains because of the shield shaped structures that form in close proximity to each other. The surface of this area is notably different from the other 14 formations mapped on Venus due to the clusters of shield plains, the morphologically smooth transition from the shields to the plains in between the shield plains, and the low amount of deformation within this region, only observably containing a few wrinkle ridges. The shield structures themselves can range from a few kilometers to greater than 10 kilometers in diameter. The formation region tends to occur as equidimensional patches several tens to hundreds of kilometers across. The relief of the formation is hilly due to the clusters of shield domes. The hypsogram of the Accruva Formation almost perfectly matches the overall hypsogram of Venus, which indicates that this formation represents the general topographic level of Venus.

Over time formation of shield dome, one of many that constitutes the Accruva Formation. Image created by GeoGifs4Gesus

== Formation ==
The shield structures are believed to be of volcanic origin. These shields typically found in close proximity with each other and will form groups of structures. The transition between the shields and the plains in between the shields is morphologically smooth and sometimes contains wrinkle ridges. This is the first unit that display no pervasive deformation. Along with the volcanic shields, slight deformation is present evidenced by wrinkle ridges and a few fractures and grabens. Likely the shields form in multiple stages over time, rather than from a single event. Single eruption events would more likely cause very large shield volcanoes, instead of the clusters of small, approximately 10 km diameter, shield domes found within the Accruva Formation. They frequently form in clusters of 100 km in diameter. This indicates that this eruption pattern of small individual eruptions was widespread and continued for an extended period of time.

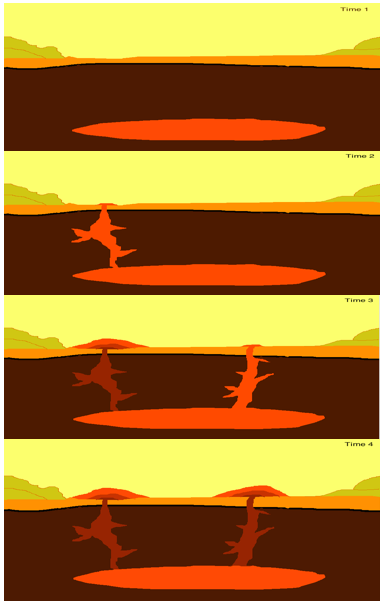
How multiple shield domes can be formed within the shield plain formation over time. Image created by Chesschamp82.

== Classification ==
The Accruva Formation was classified using the dual stratigraphic classification system. This system defines and maps rock units based on the description of the observable characteristics at the surface due to lacking other information. This is the common method used for classifying formations on other planets where we lack the necessary information to classify as we do on earth, which is classifying by its position within geologic time.

== Location ==
The Accruva Formation covers about 79.3 million square kilometers or 17.4% of the area mapped on Venus. Type locations include 29.4°N, 131.0°E; 11.9°S, 335.8°E.
