= Hoya de Huesca/Plana de Uesca =

Hoya de Huesca / Plana de Uesca
- Comarca
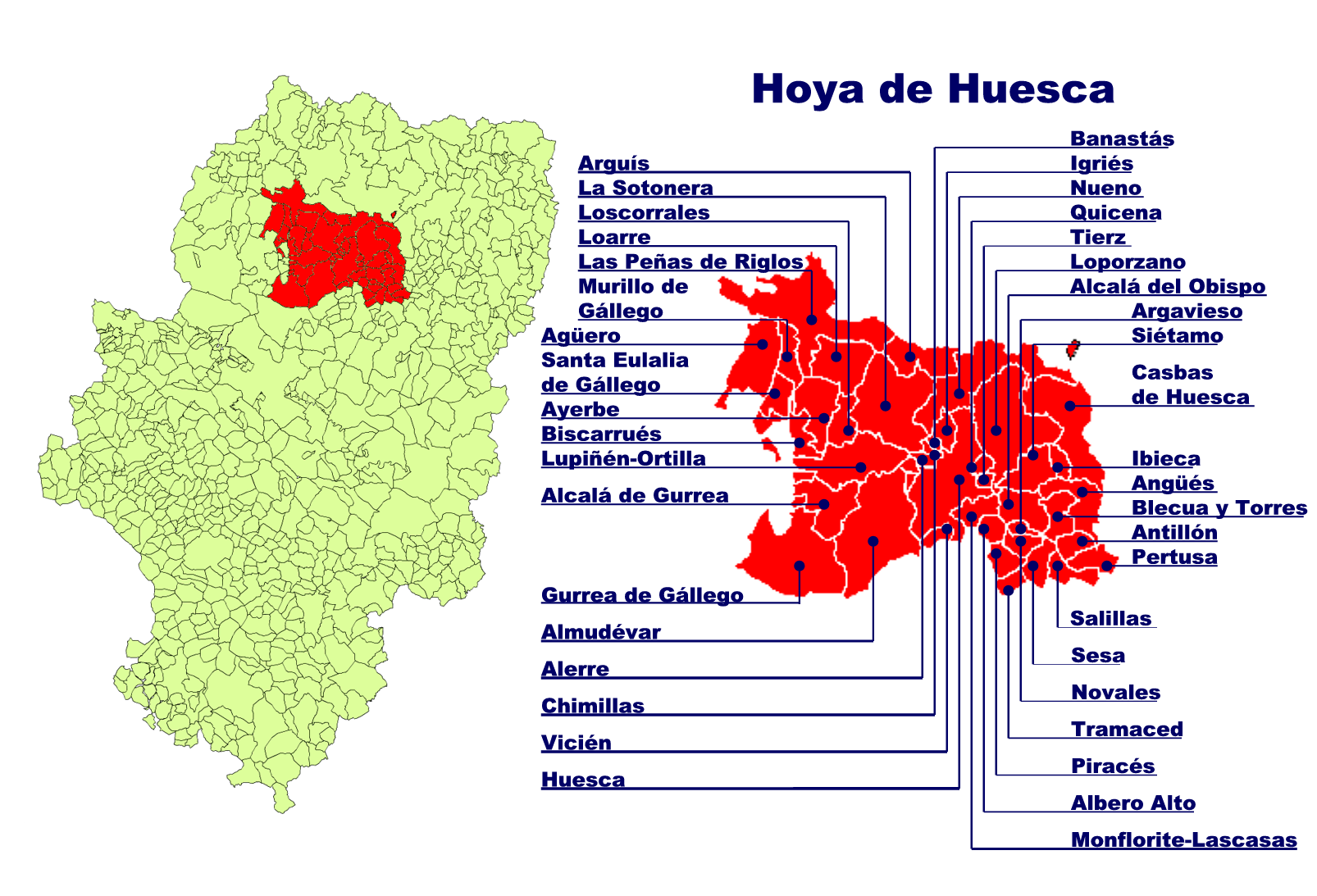
- Coordinates: 42.1167°N 0.15°W
- Country: Spain
- Autonomous community: Aragon
- Province: Huesca
- Capital: Huesca
- Municipalities: List: See text

Area
  - Total: 2,525.60 km^{2} (975.14 sq mi)

Population
  - Total: 60,525
  - Density: 23.965/km^{2} (62.068/sq mi)
- Time zone: UTC+1 (CET)
  - Summer (DST): UTC+2 (CEST)
- Largest municipality: Huesca

Hoya de Huesca/Plana de Uesca is a comarca (administrative subdivision) in the province of Huesca (Spain).

- Capital city: Huesca, also the biggest of the 40 municipalities of the comarca.
- Surface: 2,525.60 km².
- Population: 60,525 (2002).

It occupies the central area of Somontano, between the Sotón and Alcanadre rivers and the Gratal and Guara mountains. The Isuela, Flumen and Guatizalema rivers also flow across its territory.

It borders on the following comarcas:

- North - Jacetania and Alto Gállego
- South - Zaragoza and Monegros
- East - Somontano de Barbastro
- West - Cinco Villas

The local economy is based on agriculture and cattle raising. The main industry is metallurgy. Among the most popular places of interest are Huesca's 13th century Cathedral and the medieval town of Loarre.

== Municipalities ==
Agüero, Albero Alto, Alcalá de Gurrea, Alcalá del Obispo, Alerre, Almudévar, Angüés, Antillón, Argavieso, Arguis, Ayerbe, Banastás, Biscarrués, Blecua y Torres, Casbas de Huesca, Chimillas, Gurrea de Gállego, Huesca, Ibieca, Igriés, Loarre, Loporzano, Loscorrales, Lupiñén-Ortilla, Monflorite-Lascasas, Murillo de Gállego, Novales, Nueno, Las Peñas de Riglos, Pertusa, Piracés, Quicena, Salillas, Santa Eulalia de Gállego, Sesa, Siétamo, La Sotonera, Tierz, Tramaced and Vicién.
