= Bentué de Rasal =

Coordinates: 42°20′N 0°31′W

- Interactive map of Bentué de Rasal
- Country: Spain
- Province: Huesca
- Municipality: Arguis
- Elevation: 895 m (2,936 ft)

Population (2006)
  - Total: 6

Bentué de Rasal is a village under the local government of the municipality of Arguis, Hoya de Huesca, Huesca, Aragon, Spain.
