= Huesca–Pirineos Airport =

Airport serving Huesca, Spain

Huesca–Pirineos Airport Aeropuerto de Huesca-Pirineos
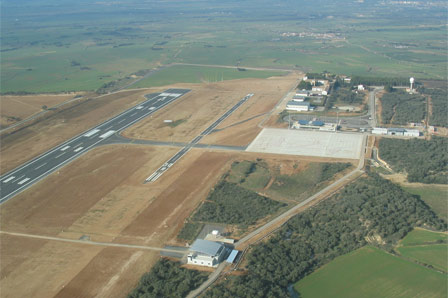
- IATA: HSK; ICAO: LEHC

Summary
- Airport type: Public
- Operator: AENA
- Serves: Huesca, Spain
- Location: Alcalá del Obispo and Monflorite-Lascasas
- Elevation AMSL: 539 m / 1,768 ft
- Coordinates: 42°04′51″N 000°19′24″W

Map
- Location within Spain

Runways
Direction	Length		Surface
Direction	m	ft	Surface
12R/30L	2,100	6,890	Asphalt
12L/30R	615	2,018	Asphalt

Statistics (2025)
- Passengers: 1,010
- Passengers change 24-25: ▲109.5%
- Source: AIP, Aena España

Huesca–Pirineos Airport (Spanish: Aeropuerto de Huesca-Pirineos) (IATA: HSK, ICAO: LEHC), also known as Huesca Airport, is the airport serving the province of Huesca in Spain.

The airport is located 9 kilometres (5.6 mi) southeast of the city of Huesca, near the villages of Monflorite-Lascasas and Alcalá del Obispo. The airport is intended to serve skiing resorts in the Aragonese Pyrenees, but the closest ski station is more than 100 kilometers away.

In 2013, 279 passengers passed through the airport, a decrease of 79.2% from 2012. Aircraft movements fell by 33.1% to 1,637.

Data for 2016 indicated that passenger usage had fallen to a total of 95 for the year (49 arrivals and 46 departures), making Huesca-Pirineos the airport with the least passenger traffic in the AENA network. However, by 2018, passenger numbers had improved, as in that year the airport handled 1,473 passengers and 9,477 flight operations

== Airlines and destinations ==
In February 2011, Pyrenair ceased activities, leaving the airport without any commercial activity until Air Europa commenced a seasonal service to Menorca which has also since ceased. As of January 2014, there are no scheduled services to or from Huesca. There are no airlines or destinations.
