= Novales =

Municipality in Aragon, Spain

Novales, Spain Novals
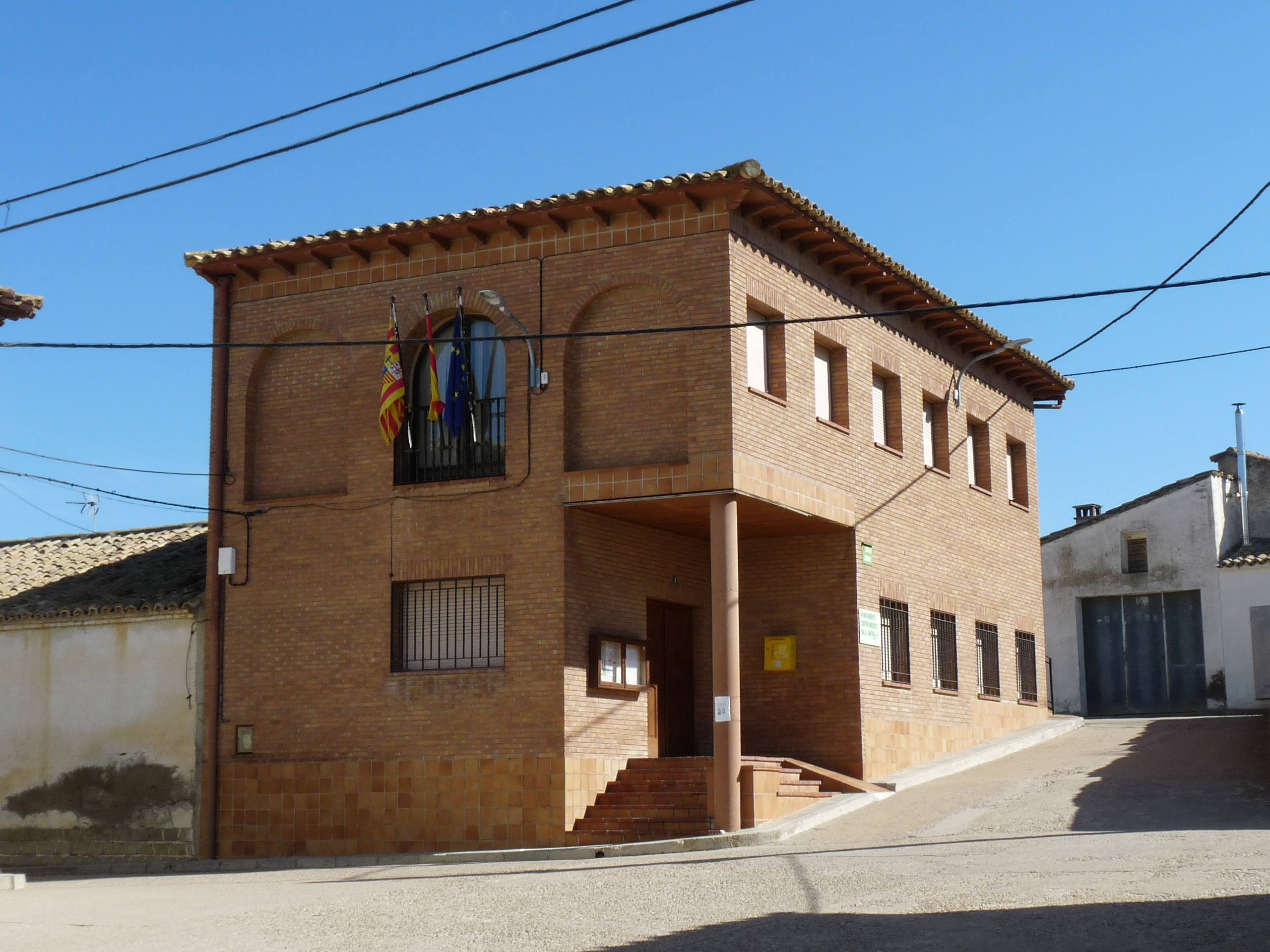
- Town hall
- Interactive map of Novales, Spain
- Coordinates: 42.0322°N 0.2867°W
- Country: Spain
- Autonomous community: Aragon
- Province: Huesca
- Municipality: Novales

Government
  - Alcalde: Vicente Monaj Rivarés (Partido Aragonés)

Area
  - Total: 20 km^{2} (7.7 sq mi)
- Elevation: 464 m (1,522 ft)

Population (2025-01-01)
  - Total: 154
  - Density: 7.7/km^{2} (20/sq mi)
- Time zone: UTC+1 (CET)
  - Summer (DST): UTC+2 (CEST)
- Website: www.novales.es

Novales (Aragonese Novals) is a municipality located in the province of Huesca, Aragon, Spain. According to the 2004 census (INE), the municipality has a population of 191 inhabitants. It is situated on a plain on the right bank of the river Guatizalema, about 16 km Southeast of Huesca.

== Geography ==
=== Bordering localities ===
- Albero Alto
- Argavieso
- Sesa

== History ==
Novales was first mentioned on 4 December 1097 in reference to Señor "Fortunio Garcez de Balle in Novales"

== Cultural heritage ==
The following buildings are part of the architectural heritage of Novales: the Castillo de Novales, the church Iglesia de Nuestra Señora del Rosario and the hermitage Ermita de San Joaquín.

== Polítics ==
=== Mayors ===
As of 2016, the mayor has come from the Partido Aragonés over the past 13 years.

Period	Mayor	Party
1979-1983	Manuel Bescós Otal	Unión de Centro Democrático
1983-1987		
1987-1991		
1991-1995		
1995-1999		
1999-2003		
2003-2007	Luis Manuel Bescós Nerín	Partido Aragonés
2007-2011		Partido Aragonés
2011-2015	Vicente Monaj Rivarés	Partido Aragonés
2015-2019	Vicente Monaj Rivarés	Partido Aragonés

=== Election results ===
Municipal elections
Party	2003	2007	2011	2015
Partido Aragonés	5	4	4	4
Ciudadanos				1
PSOE de Aragón	-	1	1	-
Partido Popular de Aragón	-	-	-	-
Chunta Aragonesista		-		
Total	5	5	5	5

=== Debt ===
The concept of the current debt considers debt with savings and banks relative to crediting institutions, fixed-income securities and loans or credit transfers to third parties, excluding commercial debt.

The municipal debt per inhabitant in 2014 was €0 after a peak of €66 in 2008.

== Demographics ==
The municipality extends over an area of 20 km^{2}, and has 176 inhabitants per the municipal population statistics of the Instituto Nacional de Estadística de España at a density of 8.76 inhabitants/km^{2}.

== Notable people ==
- Domingo Catalán, a street is named after the 6 time world champion in athletics, e.g.in 1987 and 1988 100 km World Championship.

== See also ==
- List of municipalities in Huesca
