= Pertusa =

Pertusa may refer to:

- Pertusa (Africa), an Ancient North African city, former bishopric and present titular see in present Tunisia
- Pertusa (Spain), a Spanish municipality
