= Ibon =

Ibon is a male given name in the Basque language. It may refer to:

== People ==
- Ibon Areso (born 1944), Spanish politician
- Ibon Begoña (born 1973), Spanish football player and coach
- Ibón Gutiérrez (born 1984), Spanish football player
- Ibon Koteron (born 1967), Spanish musician
- Ibon Navarro (born 1976), Spanish basketball coach
- Ibon Urbieta (born 1967), Spanish rower

== Other uses ==
- Ibón, the Aragonese term for a small mountain lake
- Ibon, common name for a gun in southwest Nigeria, taken from the Yoruba language
- IBON Foundation, a Filipino nonprofit
- The cinnamon ibon, a type of bird
