= Monflorite-Lascasas =

Monflorite-Lascasas, Spain Monflorite-As Casas
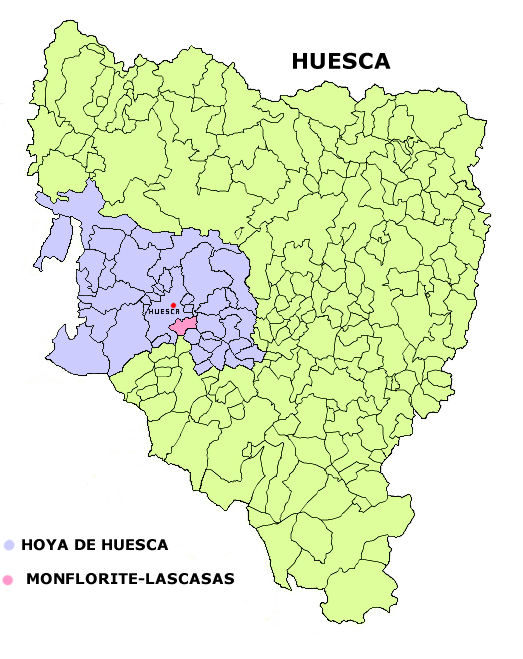
- Location in Huesca (province), Spain
- Coordinates: 42°5′N 0°21′W
- Country: Spain
- Autonomous community: Aragon
- Province: Huesca
- Comarca: Hoya de Huesca
- Municipality: Monflorite-Lascasas

Government
  - Mayor: Pedro Salas Parra

Area
  - Total: 29 km^{2} (11 sq mi)

Population (2025-01-01)
  - Total: 475
- Time zone: UTC+1 (CET)
  - Summer (DST): UTC+2 (CEST)

Monflorite-Lascasas (Aragonese Monflorite-As Casas) is a village in Aragon, Spain. It is located in the Hoya de Huesca to the south-east of the provincial capital, Huesca. Along with the neighbouring municipality of Alcalá del Obispo it is the site of Huesca–Pirineos Airport.

Historical population
Year	Pop.	±%
1970	371	—
1981	205	−44.7%
1992	193	−5.9%
1999	185	−4.1%
2004	193	+4.3%
2006	217	+12.4%

== See also ==
- List of municipalities in Huesca
