= Lupiñén-Ortilla =

Lupiñén-Ortilla Lopinyén-Ortiella
- Location in Spain. Lupiñén-Ortilla (Aragon)
- Coordinates: 42°10′34″N 0°34′52″W
- Country: Spain
- Autonomous community: Aragon
- Province: Huesca
- Comarca: Hoya de Huesca

Government
  - Mayor: Joaquín Mariano Til Aín

Area
  - Total: 110.1 km^{2} (42.5 sq mi)
- Elevation: 469 m (1,539 ft)

Population (2025-01-01)
  - Total: 359
  - Density: 3.26/km^{2} (8.45/sq mi)
- Demonym: Lupiñenenses
- Time zone: UTC+1 (CET)
  - Summer (DST): UTC+2 (CEST)

Lupiñén-Ortilla (Aragonese Lopinyén-Ortiella) is a municipality located in the province of Huesca, Aragon, Spain.

== See also ==
- List of municipalities in Huesca
