= Ibón de Tebarray =

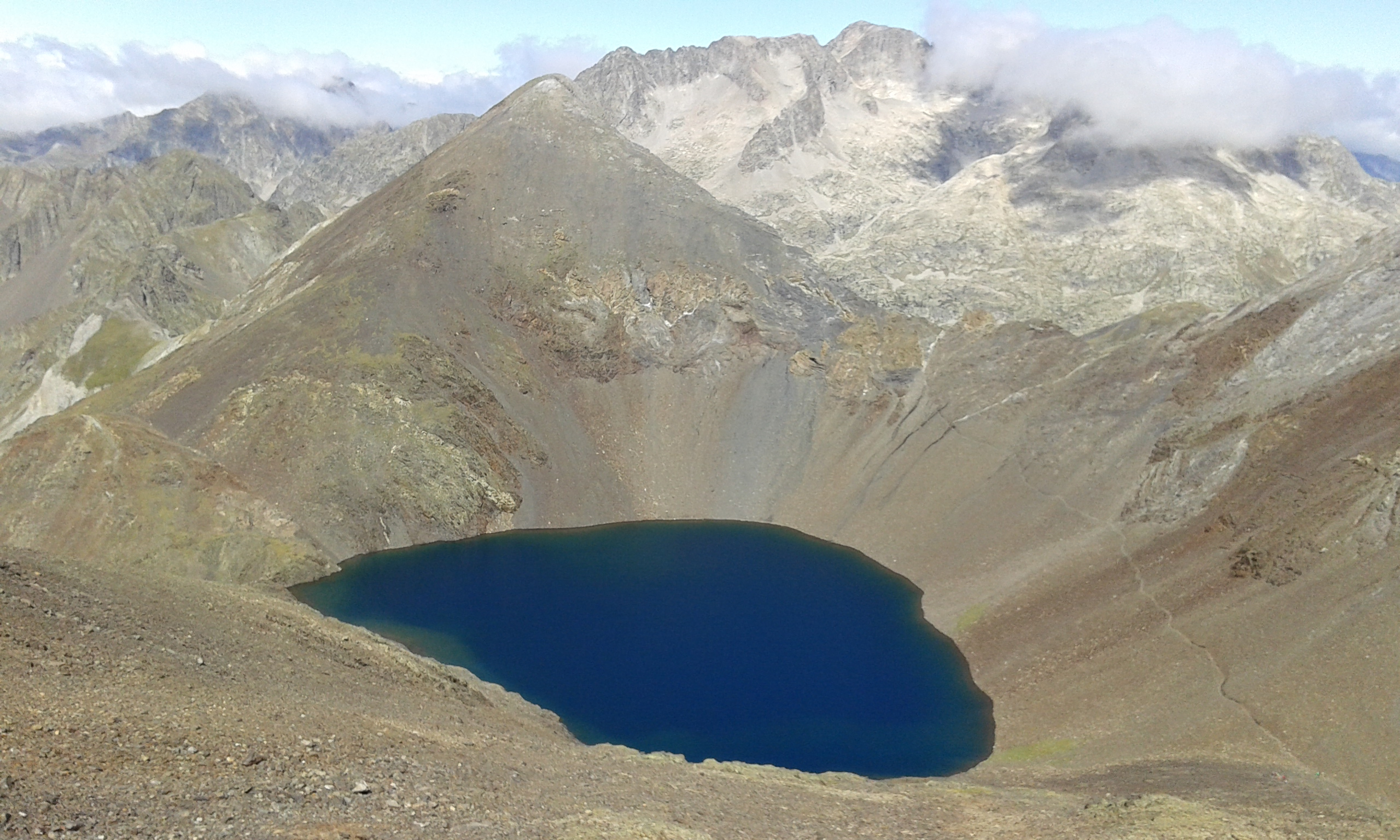

- Location within Spain
- Location: Province of Huesca, northeastern Spain
- Coordinates: 42°47′24″N 0°16′02″W
- Type: lake
- Surface elevation: 2,710 metres (8,890 ft)

Ibón de Tebarray is a semi-frozen lake in the Province of Huesca, northeastern Spain. It lies at an elevation of 2,710 metres (8,890 ft), below Pico de Tebarray.
