= Pyrenair =

Spanish charter airline, 2006–2011

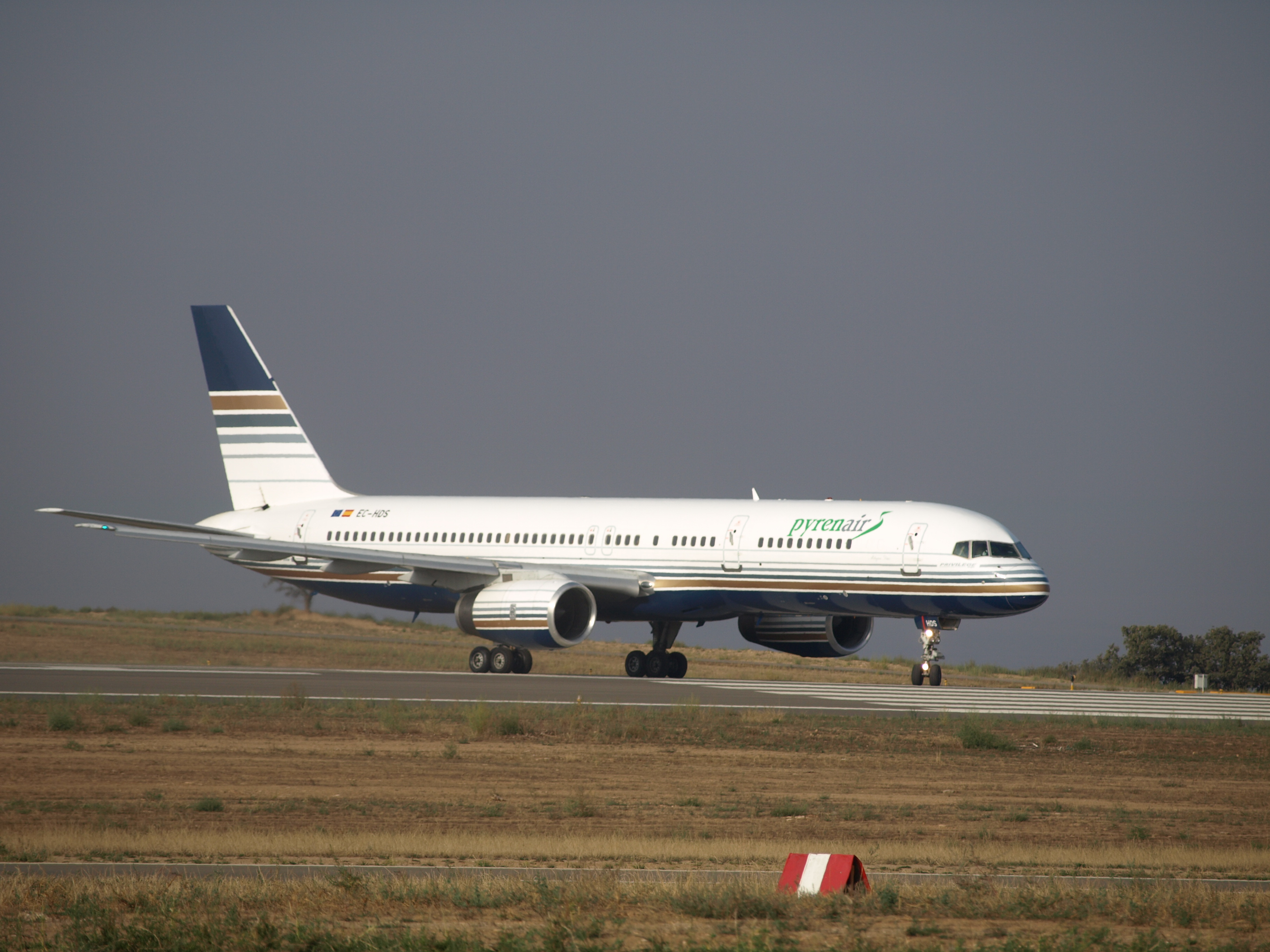
- Pyrenair Boeing 757-200
IATA	ICAO	Call sign
-	-	-
- Founded: 2006
- Ceased operations: 2011
- Operating bases: Huesca–Pirineos Airport
- Headquarters: Huesca, Spain
- Website: www.pyrenair.es (defunct)

Pyrenair was a Spanish charter airline based in Huesca, Aragon.

== Company history ==
Pyrenair was founded in 2006 at the time of the inauguration of the Huesca–Pirineos Airport.

During the 2007-2008 winter skiing season Pyrenair made a flight agreement with Air Nostrum between Huesca, Madrid, A Coruña, Valencia and Lisbon.

By 2008-2009 the flights to Valencia were canceled but new destinations were opened, including Sevilla, London-Gatwick and Palma de Mallorca. The season closed with a total of 194 flights —a 29% increase from the previous year— with a total of 11,100 passengers — a 48% increase.

In the 2010–2011 season Pyrenair increased its number of flights adding one new destination, Lleida–Alguaire Airport.

Owing to financial difficulties, the airline ceased operations on 15 February 2011, leaving many passengers having booked tickets stranded. The Huesca–Pirineos Airport —which was heavily dependent on Pyrenair's commercial activity— was also left in a difficult position.

== Fleet ==
Pyrenair leased different planes from different companies along its history. The planes used include:

- 1 Boeing 737-400
- 1 Boeing 757-200
- 1 Airbus A320
- 1 Fokker 100

== See also ==
- List of defunct airlines of Spain
