= San Miguel de Foces =

Church in Ibieca, Spain

Coordinates: 42°08′49″N 0°12′11″W

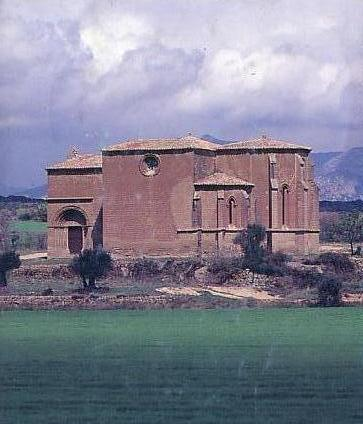
Church of San Miguel de Foces.

San Miguel de Foces is a church located 2 km from Ibieca, central Spain.

== See also ==
- Catholic Church in Spain
