= Piracés =

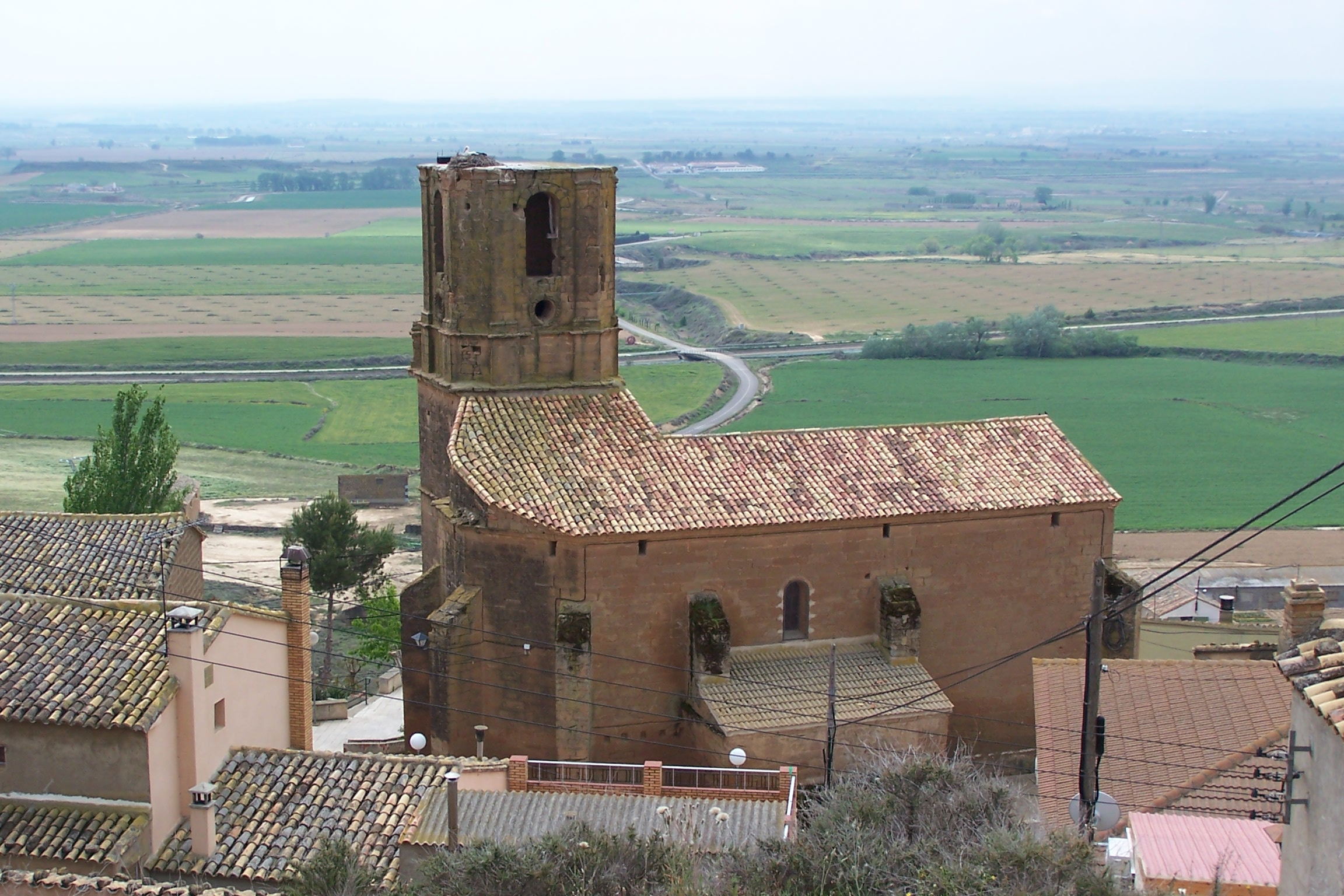

- Location in Spain
- Coordinates: 42°0′18″N 0°18′58″W
- Country: Spain
- Autonomous community: Aragon
- Province: Huesca
- Comarca: Hoya de Huesca

Government
  - Mayor: Sergio Villacampa Ferrando

Area
  - Total: 25.29 km^{2} (9.76 sq mi)
- Elevation: 453 m (1,486 ft)

Population (2025-01-01)
  - Total: 92
  - Density: 3.6/km^{2} (9.4/sq mi)
- Time zone: UTC+1 (CET)
  - Summer (DST): UTC+2 (CEST)
- Post Code: 22268
- Tel. Prefix: (+34)
- Vehicle registration: HU

Piracés is a municipality located in the province of Huesca, Aragon, Spain. As of 2016, the municipality has a population of 103 inhabitants.

== See also ==
- List of municipalities in Huesca
