= Ibieca =

- Municipality
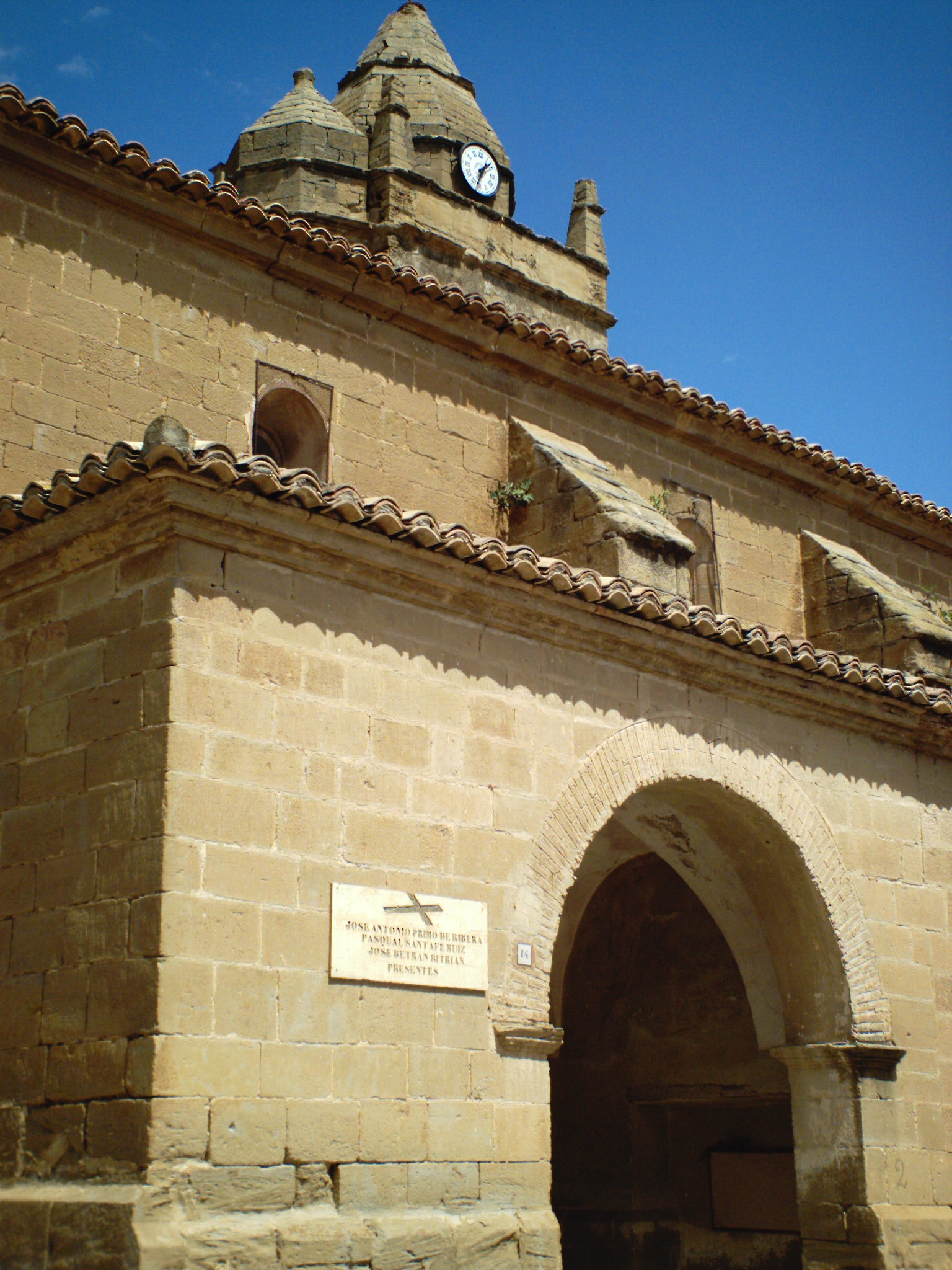
- The church of Pope Clement I

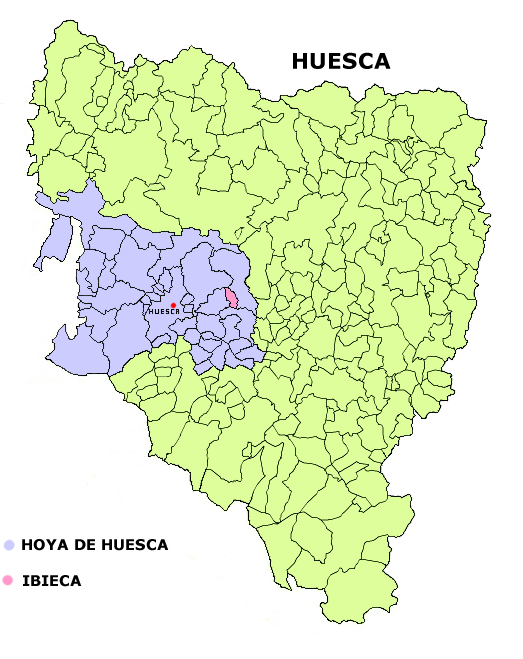
- Location in Huesca (province), Spain
- Coordinates: 42°10′N 0°12′W
- Country: Spain
- Autonomous community: Aragon
- Province: Huesca
- Comarca: Hoya de Huesca
- Municipality: Ibieca

Government
  - Mayor: Ángel Arilla

Area
  - Total: 14.95 km^{2} (5.77 sq mi)
- Elevation: 640 m (2,100 ft)

Population (2025-01-01)
  - Total: 110
  - Density: 7.4/km^{2} (19/sq mi)
- Time zone: UTC+1 (CET)
  - Summer (DST): UTC+2 (CEST)

Ibieca is a village in Aragon, Spain.

Historical population
Year	Pop.	±%
1900	401	—
1910	392	−2.2%
1930	301	−23.2%
1940	298	−1.0%
1950	284	−4.7%
1960	240	−15.5%
1970	167	−30.4%
1981	136	−18.6%
1992	112	−17.6%
1999	101	−9.8%
2004	117	+15.8%
2006	114	−2.6%

== Monuments ==
- San Miguel de Foces
- Church of Pope Clement I (Ibieca)

== See also ==
- List of municipalities in Huesca
