= Siétamo =

- Municipality
- Location within Aragon Location within Spain
- Coordinates: 42°7′28.07″N 0°16′57.16″W
- Country: Spain
- Autonomous community: Aragon
- Province: Huesca
- Comarca: Hoya de Huesca/Plana de Uesca

Area
  - Total: 48.3 km^{2} (18.6 sq mi)
- Elevation: 559 m (1,834 ft)

Population (2025-01-01)
  - Total: 697
  - Density: 14.4/km^{2} (37.4/sq mi)
- Time zone: UTC+1 (CET)
  - Summer (DST): UTC+2 (CEST)
- Website: Ayuntamiento de Siétamo

Siétamo (Aragonese: Sietemo) is a municipality located in the province of Huesca, Aragon, Spain, in the comarca of Hoya de Huesca. It is the birthplace of the Count of Aranda and Cardinal Javierre. It is located 12 km from Huesca, in the N-240, on a gentle hill near the river Guatizalema.

In March 1099 the King Peter I of Aragon gave to the monastery of Montearagón the church of "Setimo". In 1845 it joined with Castejón de Arbaniés. From 1970-1980 it was joined with Arbaniés and Liesa.
