= Master of Arguis =

Aragonese painter

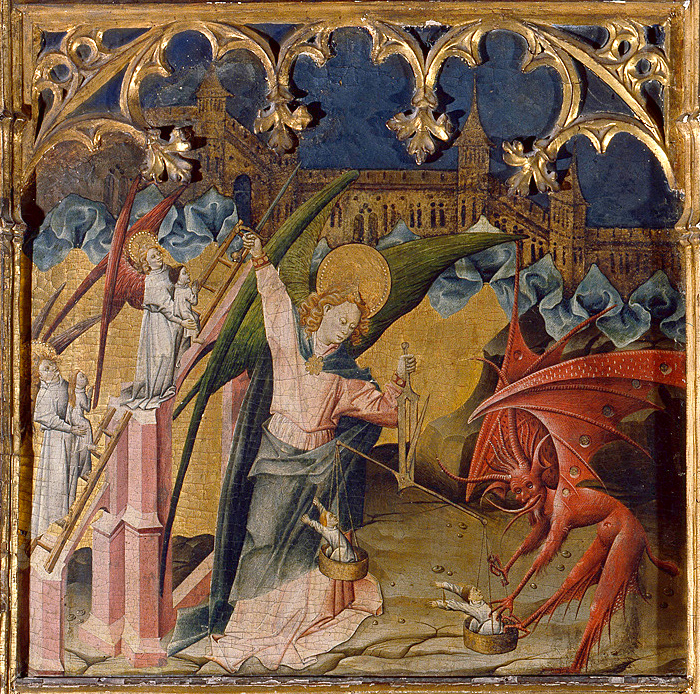
Panel of the altarpiece of the Archangel Michael. Master of Arguis.

The Master of Arguis was an Aragonese artist active in the first half of the 15th century. Stylistically, his work is related to that of Juan de Levi and Bonanat Zaortiga, and is derived from the tradition of the International Gothic in Aragon. His name is derived from a retable of Saint Michael dating to about 1440, now in the Museo del Prado in Madrid; this was once the main altarpiece of the church of Arguis.

The painting depicts the victory of Michael over the Antichrist, and focuses primarily on the latter figure, pierced with a lance. Included in the scene are various secular figures, including kings and noblemen, as well as religious figures. At the bottom of the image may be seen a papal tiara and sceptre, symbols of the power the Antichrist claims to wield as the new Messiah.

Two other paintings, both dedicated to Saint Anne, are attributed to the Master; one is in Barcelona, while the other, a small triptych, is in the collegiate church of Alquezar.
