= Banastás =

Banastás Banastars
- municipality
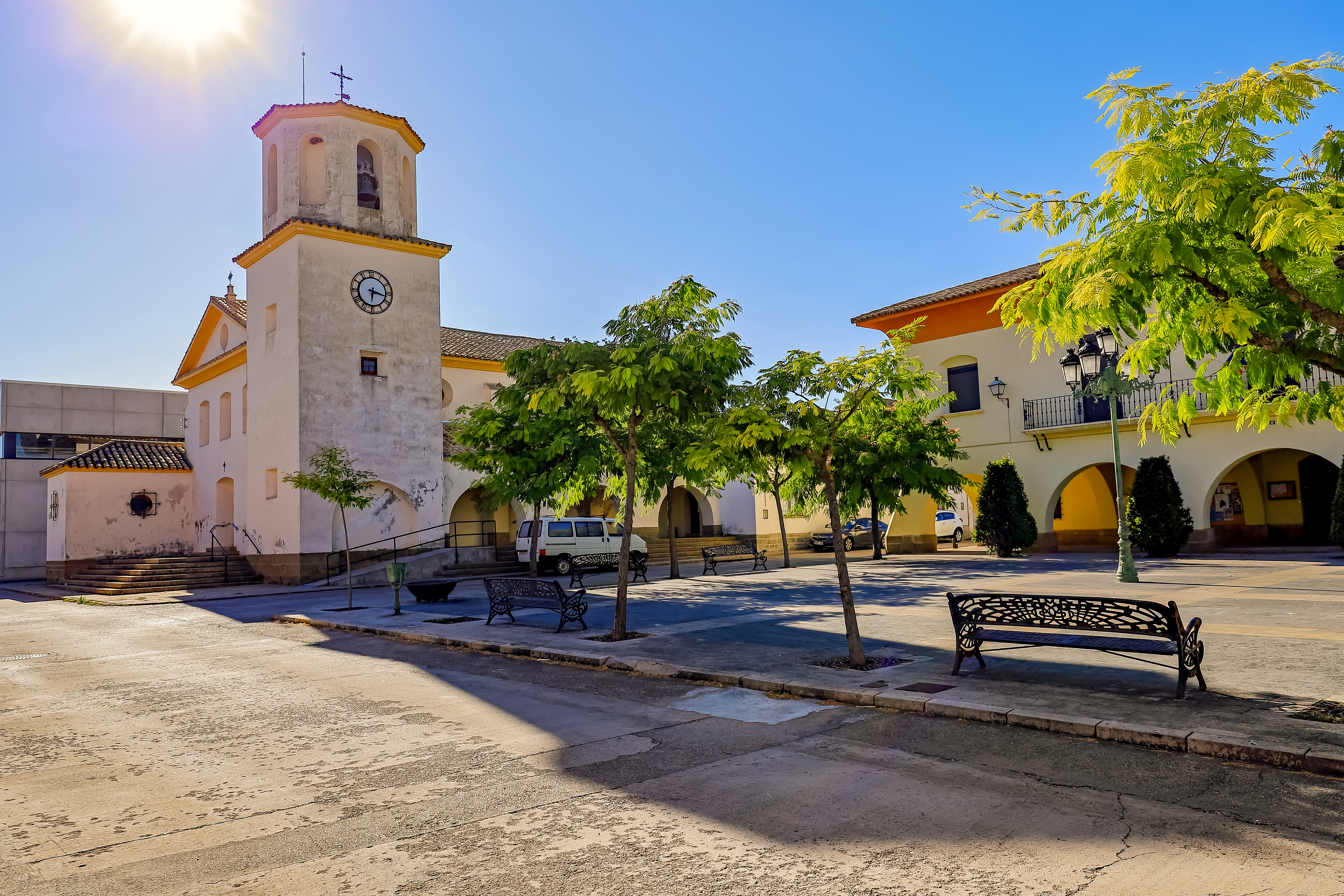

- Location in Spain
- Coordinates: 42°11′N 0°27′W
- Country: Spain
- Autonomous community: Aragon
- Province: Huesca
- Comarca: Hoya de Huesca

Government
  - Mayor: Ángel Gracia Banzo (People's Party of Aragon)

Area
  - Total: 4.66 km^{2} (1.80 sq mi)
- Elevation: 532 m (1,745 ft)

Population (2025-01-01)
  - Total: 335
  - Density: 71.9/km^{2} (186/sq mi)
- Time zone: UTC+1
  - Summer (DST): UTC+2 (CEST)
- Postal code: 22194
- Website: www.banastas.es

Banastás (Aragonese Banastars) is a municipality in the province of Huesca, Spain. As of 2016, it has a population of 297 inhabitants.

== See also ==
- List of municipalities in Huesca
