= Chimillas =

Chimillas Chimiellas
- Municipality
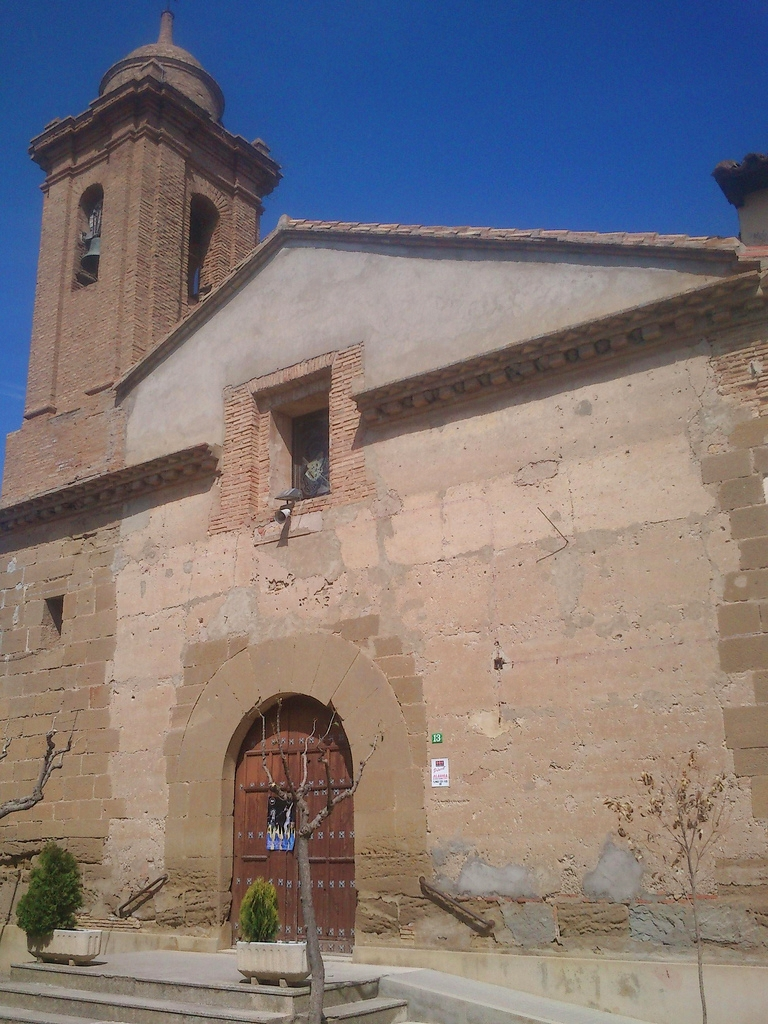
- A church in Chimillas.

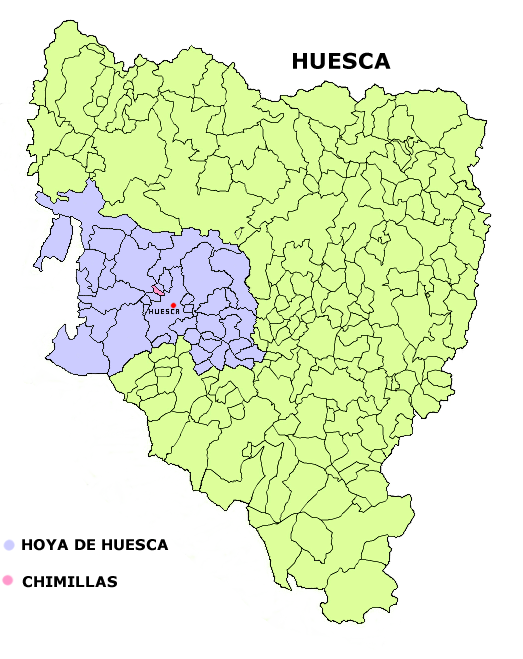

- Location of Chimillas. Chimillas (Aragon)
- Coordinates: 42°10′N 0°27′W
- Country: Spain
- Community: Aragon
- Province: Huesca
- Comarca: Hoya de Huesca

Government
  - Mayor: Miguel Ángel Torres (PP)

Area
  - Total: 10.04 km^{2} (3.88 sq mi)

Population (2023)
  - Total: 396
  - Density: 39.4/km^{2} (102/sq mi)
- Time zone: UTC+1 (CET)
  - Summer (DST): UTC+2 (CEST)
- Postal code: 22194
- Website: www.chimillas.es

Chimillas (Aragonese Chimiellas) is a municipality in the province of Huesca, Spain. As of 2023, it has a population of 396 inhabitants.

== See also ==
- List of municipalities in Huesca
