= Igriés =

Coordinates: 42°13′N 0°26′W

Igriés, Spain
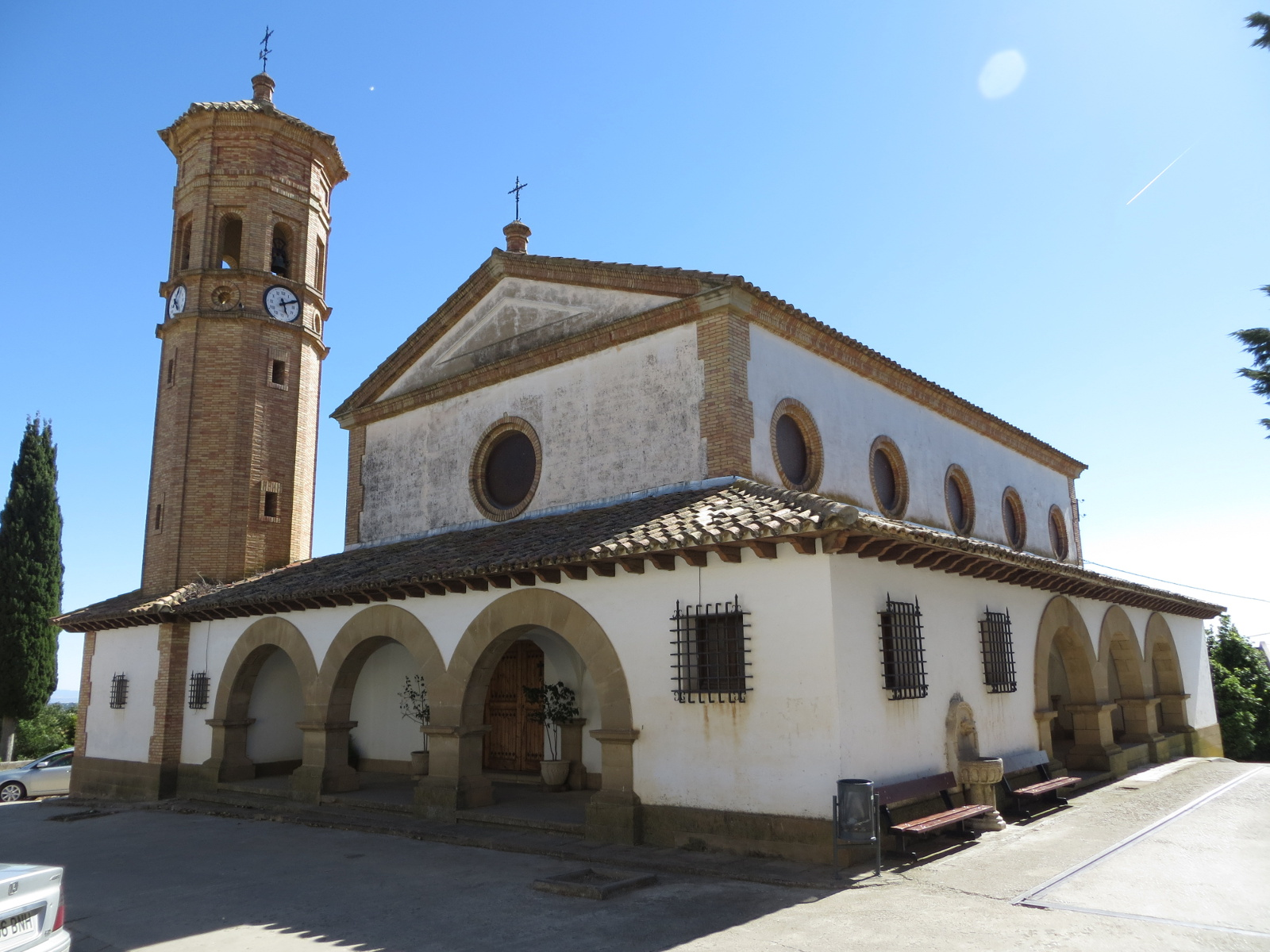
- Interactive map of Igriés, Spain
- Country: Spain
- Autonomous community: Aragon
- Province: Huesca
- Municipality: Igriés

Population (2025-01-01)
  - Total: 727
- Time zone: UTC+1 (CET)
  - Summer (DST): UTC+2 (CEST)

Igriés is a small village located in the Hoya de Huesca, in the province of Aragón in northern Spain.

== Geography ==
Situated south of the Pyrenees, about nine kilometers to the north of Huesca, along the road to Sabiñánigo, in the valley of the river Isuela, and near the Satocobá mountain. The municipality of Igriés also includes the small village of Yéqueda.

== History ==
Igriés was first mentioned in 1104, by the Bishop of Huesca and Montearagón. (Ubieto Arteta, Cartulario de Montearagón, nº. 38)

== Politics ==
List of Mayors
Term	Name	Party
1995-1999	Inmaculada Oliván Lample	Partido Popular
1999-2003	Mariajose Ordás Arnal	Partido Popular
2003-2007	Constancio Calvo Sanmartín	Partido Popular
2007-2011	Constancio Calvo Sanmartín	Partido Aragonés

== Demographics ==
Demographics
1900	1910	1930	1940	1950	1960	1970	1981	1986	1992	1999	2004	2005	2007
442	453	410	339	316	252	190	198	181	179	199	362	415	514

== Notable Locations ==
Igriés is home to the Hermitage of San Juan, dating to the 12th century. A military base shares the village's name, and is nearby.

== See also ==
- List of municipalities in Huesca
