= Alerre =

- municipality
- Coat of arms

- Location in Spain
- Coordinates: 42°10′N 0°28′W
- Country: Spain
- Autonomous community: Aragon
- Province: Huesca
- Comarca: Hoya de Huesca

Government
  - Mayor: Francisco José Santolaria Alastrué (Partido de los Socialistas de Aragón)

Area
  - Total: 8.95 km^{2} (3.46 sq mi)
- Elevation: 505 m (1,657 ft)

Population (2025-01-01)
  - Total: 224
  - Density: 25.0/km^{2} (64.8/sq mi)
- Time zone: UTC+1
  - Summer (DST): UTC+2 (CEST)
- Postal code: 22194
- Website: www.alerre.es

Alerre is a municipality in the province of Huesca, Spain. As of 2018, it has a population of 201 inhabitants.

== See also ==
- List of municipalities in Huesca
