= Ibón de Escalar =

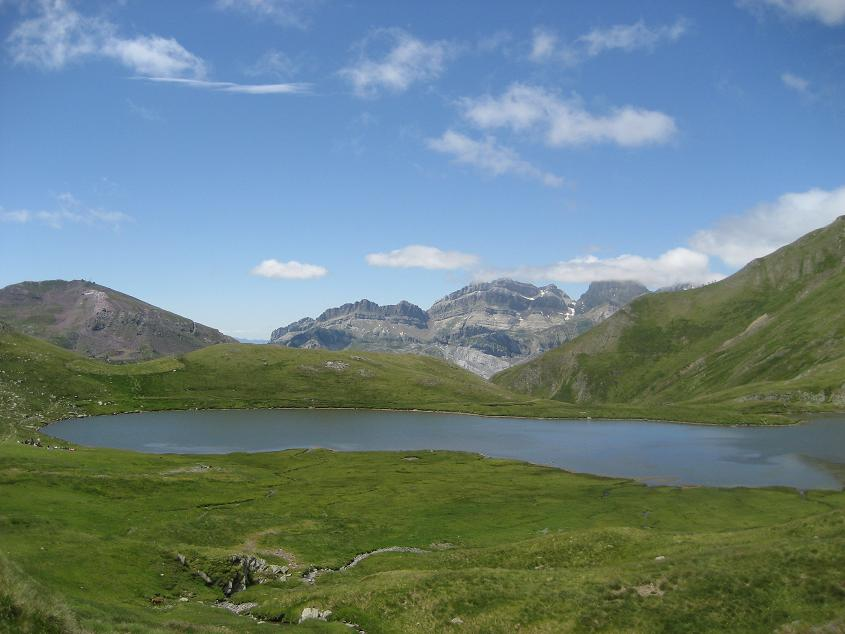

- Location within Spain
- Location: Province of Huesca, northeastern Spain
- Coordinates: 42.8225°N 0.5039°W
- Type: lake
- Surface elevation: 2,078 metres (6,818 ft)

Ibón de Escalar is a lake in the Province of Huesca, northeastern Spain. It lies at an elevation of 2,078 metres (6,818 ft) in the Valle de Astún.
