= Province of Huesca =

Province of Spain

Province of Huesca Provincia de Huesca (Spanish) Provincia de Uesca (Aragonese) Província d'Osca (Catalan)
- Province
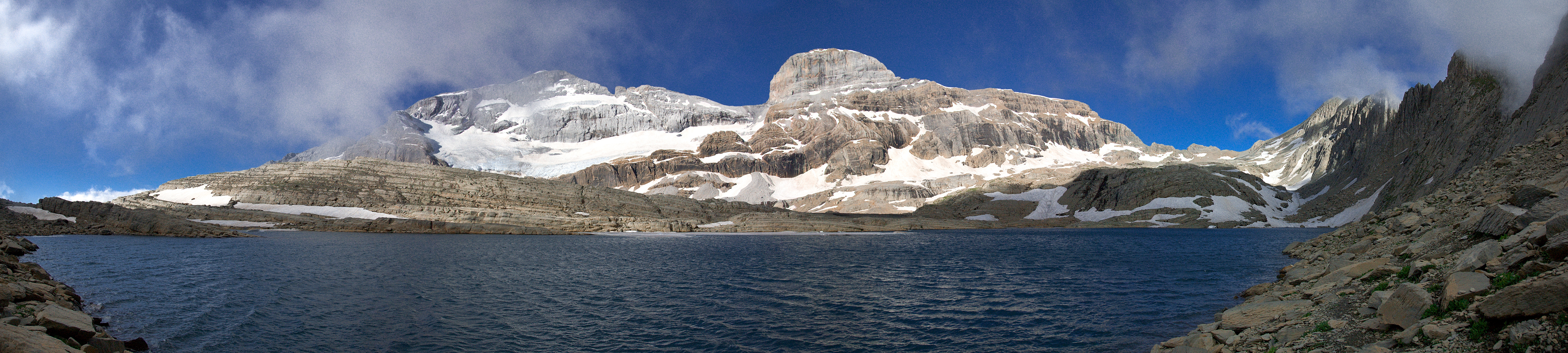
- The Marboré lake with the Monte Perdido and the Cilindro de Marboré in the background

- Flag Coat of arms

- Location of the Province of Huesca in Spain
- Coordinates: 42°10′N 0°10′W
- Country: Spain
- Autonomous community: Aragon
- Capital: Huesca
- Municipalities: 202

Area
  - Total: 15,637.60 km^{2} (6,037.71 sq mi)
  - Rank: 6th in Spain
- 3.1% of Spain

Population (2025)
  - Total: 230,087
  - Rank: 43rd in Spain
  - Density: 14.7137/km^{2} (38.1083/sq mi)
- Demonym: Oscense
- Time zone: UTC+1 (CET)
  - Summer (DST): UTC+2 (CEST)
- Language(s): Spanish, Aragonese, Catalan

The Province of Huesca (Spanish: Provincia de Huesca, Aragonese: Provincia de Uesca; Catalan: Província d'Osca), officially Huesca/Uesca, is a province of northeastern Spain, in the northern part of the autonomous community of Aragon. The capital is Huesca. It has a population of 230,087 in an area of 15,637.60 square kilometres (6,037.71 sq mi) across its 202 municipalities.

Positioned just south of the central Pyrenees, Huesca borders France and the French departments of Haute-Garonne, Pyrénées-Atlantiques, and Hautes-Pyrénées. Within Spain, Huesca's neighboring provinces are Navarre, Zaragoza, and Lleida.

== History ==
The Romans colonised the province of Huesca, which formed the northern part of Hispania Tarraconensis, and continued to live there well into the 5th century until the arrival of the Visigoths. As a mountainous frontier region, it was difficult to dominate. The northern counties had at one time belonged to the Kingdom of Navarre but split off and managed to stem early Moorish invasions in the Middle Ages by forming alliances between themselves and with the Franks, to become Frankish feudal marches. The imperative of sovereignty, or independence, for the northern border counts, gave rise to the Kingdom of Aragon, which was the precursor to the Empire or Crown of Aragon, and ultimately the Kingdom of Spain.

== Geography ==
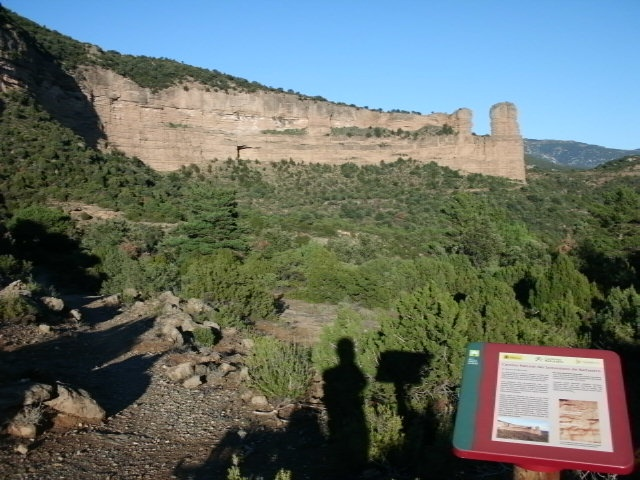
"The Egg of Morrano" or the "Peña Falconera" rock formation (Spanish: El Huevo de Morrano).

Covering a primarily mountainous area of 15,626 km^{2} (6,033 sq mi), the province of Huesca has a total population of 219,345 in 2018, with almost a quarter of its people living in the capital city of Huesca. The low population density, 14.62/km^{2}, has meant that Huesca's lush valleys, rivers, and lofty mountain ranges have remained relatively pristine and unspoiled by progress.

Huesca is home to the tallest mountain in the Pyrenees, the Aneto; glaciers, such as at Monte Perdido; and the National Park of Ordesa and Monte Perdido, rich in flora and protected fauna. Popular with mountaineers, spelunkers, paragliders, and white water rafters, it is also a popular snow skiing destination with notable resorts in Candanchú, Formigal, Astún, Panticosa, and Cerler.

=== Lakes ===
- Ibón de Bachimaña Alto
- Ibón de Escalar
- Ibón de Estanés
- Ibón de Tebarray

== Administrative divisions ==
=== Comarcas ===
The modern day province comprises 10 comarcas.

Comarca	Capital City
Alto Gállego	Sabiñánigo
Bajo Cinca	Fraga
Cinca Medio	Monzón
Hoya de Huesca	Huesca
Jacetania	Jaca
La Litera	Tamarite de Litera
Monegros	Sariñena
Ribagorza	Graus, formerly Benabarre
Sobrarbe	Ainsa and Boltaña
Somontano de Barbastro	Barbastro

The following comarcas having their capital in Huesca Province include municipal terms within Zaragoza Province:

- Bajo Cinca: Mequinenza.
- Hoya de Huesca: Murillo de Gállego and Santa Eulalia de Gállego.
- Jacetania: Artieda, Mianos, Salvatierra de Esca and Sigüés.
- Monegros: La Almolda, Bujaraloz, Farlete, Leciñena, Monegrillo and Perdiguera.

=== Municipalities ===
The province has 202 municipalities:

- Abiego
- Abizanda
- Adahuesca
- Agüero
- Aínsa-Sobrarbe
- Aisa
- Albalate de Cinca
- Albalatillo
- Albelda
- Albero Alto
- Albero Bajo
- Alberuela de Tubo
- Alcalá de Gurrea
- Alcalá del Obispo
- Alcampell
- Alcolea de Cinca
- Alcubierre
- Alerre
- Alfántega
- Almudévar
- Almunia de San Juan
- Almuniente
- Alquézar
- Altorricón
- Angüés
- Ansó
- Antillón
- Aragüés del Puerto
- Arén
- Argavieso
- Arguis
- Ayerbe
- Azanuy-Alins
- Azara
- Azlor
- Baélls
- Bailo
- Baldellou
- Ballobar
- Banastás
- Barbastro
- Barbués
- Barbuñales
- Bárcabo
- Belver de Cinca
- Benabarre
- Benasque
- Berbegal
- Bielsa
- Bierge
- Biescas
- Binaced
- Binéfar
- Bisaurri
- Biscarrués
- Blecua y Torres
- Boltaña
- Bonansa
- Borau
- Broto
- Caldearenas
- Campo
- Camporrélls
- Canal de Berdún
- Candasnos
- Canfranc
- Capdesaso
- Capella
- Casbas de Huesca
- Castejón de Monegros
- Castejón de Sos
- Castejón del Puente
- Castelflorite
- Castiello de Jaca
- Castigaleu
- Castillazuelo
- Castillonroy
- Colungo
- Chalamera
- Chía
- Chimillas
- Esplús
- Estada
- Estadilla
- Estopiñán del Castillo
- Fago
- Fanlo
- Fiscal
- Fonz
- Foradada del Toscar
- Fraga
- La Fueva
- Gistaín
- El Grado
- Grañén
- Graus
- Gurrea de Gállego
- Hoz de Jaca
- Hoz y Costean
- Huerto
- Huesca
- Ibieca
- Igriés
- Ilche
- Isábena
- Jaca
- Jasa
- Labuerda
- Laluenga
- Lalueza
- Lanaja
- Laperdiguera
- Lascellas-Ponzano
- Lascuarre
- Laspaúles
- Laspuña
- Loarre
- Loporzano
- Loscorrales
- Lupiñén-Ortilla
- Monesma y Cajigar
- Monflorite-Lascasas
- Montanuy
- Monzón
- Naval
- Novales
- Nueno
- Olvena
- Ontiñena
- Osso de Cinca
- Palo
- Panticosa
- Peñalba
- Las Peñas de Riglos
- Peralta de Alcofea
- Peralta de Calasanz
- Peraltilla
- Perarrúa
- Pertusa
- Piracés
- Plan
- Poleñino
- Pozán de Vero
- La Puebla de Castro
- Puente de Montañana
- Puente la Reina de Jaca
- Puértolas
- El Pueyo de Araguás
- Pueyo de Santa Cruz
- Quicena
- Robres
- Sabiñánigo
- Sahún
- Salas Altas
- Salas Bajas
- Salillas
- Sallent de Gállego
- San Esteban de Litera
- San Juan de Plan
- San Miguel del Cinca
- Sangarrén
- Santa Cilia
- Santa Cruz de la Serós
- Santa María de Dulcis
- Santaliestra y San Quílez
- Sariñena
- Secastilla
- Seira
- Sena
- Senés de Alcubierre
- Sesa
- Sesué
- Siétamo
- Sopeira
- La Sotonera
- Tamarite de Litera
- Tardienta
- Tella-Sin
- Tierz
- Tolva
- Torla
- Torralba de Aragón
- Torre la Ribera
- Torrente de Cinca
- Torres de Alcanadre
- Torres de Barbués
- Tramaced
- Valfarta
- Valle de Bardají
- Valle de Hecho
- Valle de Lierp
- Velilla de Cinca
- Vencillón
- Veracruz
- Viacamp y Litera
- Vicién
- Villanova
- Villanúa
- Villanueva de Sigena
- Yebra de Basa
- Yésero
- Zaidín

== Demographics ==
As of 2026, the population is 230,087, of which 50.9% are male, and 49.1% are female. Minors make up 15.8% of the population, and seniors make up 23.2%.

Historical population

Year	Pop.	±%
1842	178,936	—
1857	257,939	+44.2%
1877	256,425	−0.6%
1887	260,585	+1.6%
1900	255,100	−2.1%
1910	264,984	+3.9%
1920	265,603	+0.2%
1930	257,777	−2.9%
1940	247,135	−4.1%

Year	Pop.	±%
1950	237,681	−3.8%
1960	234,014	−1.5%
1970	221,761	−5.2%
1981	214,907	−3.1%
1991	207,810	−3.3%
2001	206,502	−0.6%
2011	225,962	+9.4%
2021	223,995	−0.9%

Source: INE

=== Languages ===
Spanish is the primary language in the province. However, the local linguistic varieties in the center and north of the province (often called fabla) belong to the Aragonese language, which now survives mainly in the northernmost comarcas, such as the Aragon Valley in Jacetania, the Alto Gallego, Sobrarbe, and Ribagorza, where hitherto landlocked and isolated villages have helped the language to thrive into the 21st century.

In the easternmost areas of the province, varieties of the Catalan language are spoken, with a few transitional dialects difficult to classify as Aragonese or Catalan.

=== Immigration ===
As of 2025, immigrants make up 19.1% of the population. The 5 largest foreign countries of birth are Romania, Morocco, Colombia, Venezuela, and Mali.
