= Vicién =

Vicién, Spain
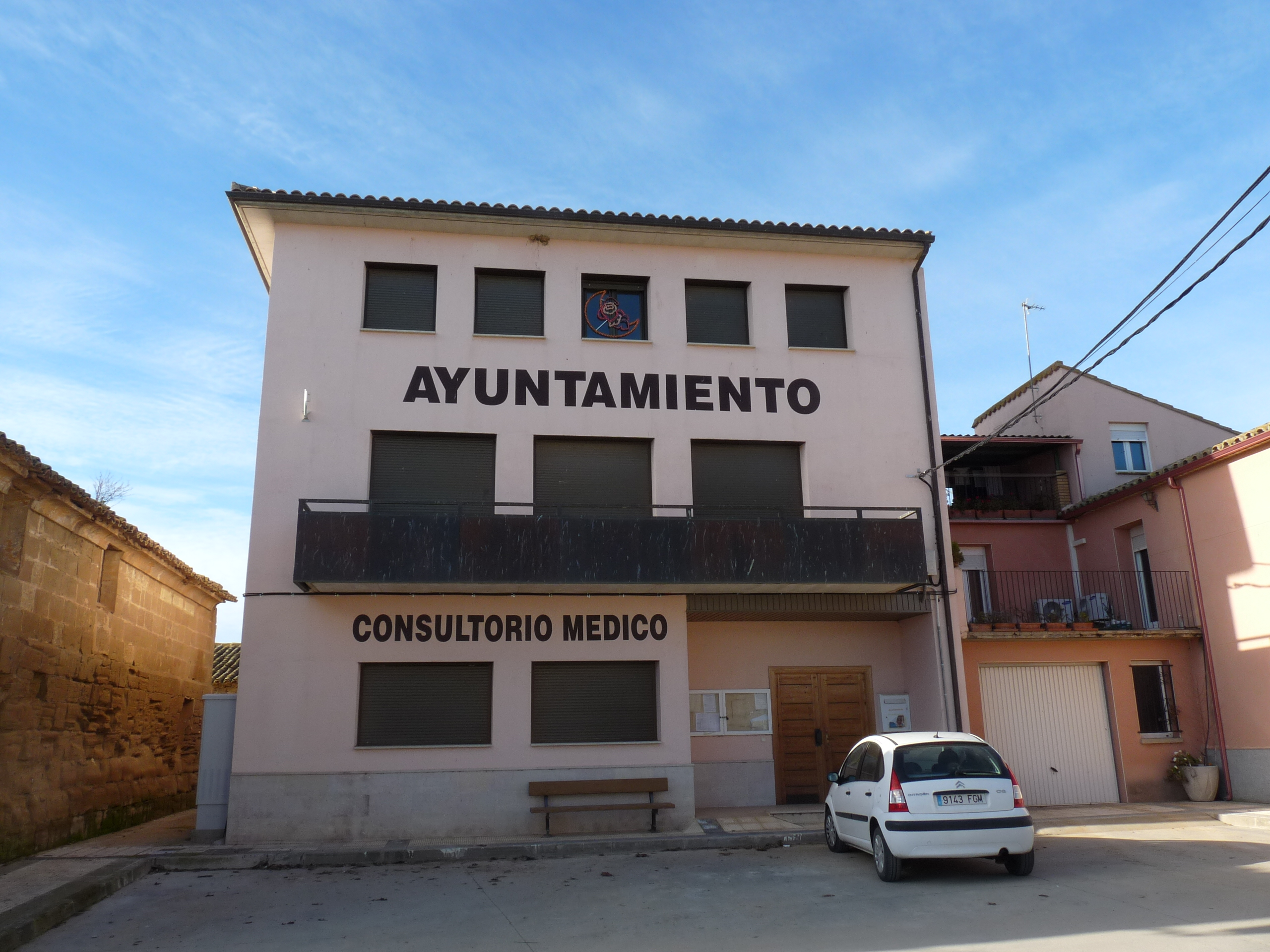
- Town hall

- Location within Aragon Location within Spain
- Coordinates: 42°3′23″N 0°26′27″W
- Country: Spain
- Autonomous community: Aragon
- Province: Huesca
- Municipality: Vicién

Area
  - Total: 13 km^{2} (5.0 sq mi)
- Elevation: 394 m (1,293 ft)

Population (2025-01-01)
  - Total: 149
  - Density: 11/km^{2} (30/sq mi)
- Time zone: UTC+1 (CET)
  - Summer (DST): UTC+2 (CEST)
- Website: http://www.vicien.es/

Vicién is a municipality located in the province of Huesca, Aragon, Spain. According to the 2018 census (INE), the municipality has a population of 116 inhabitants.

== Geography ==
Vicién is situated at an altitude of 394 metres above sea level, at a distance of 9 km from Huesca, the capital of its comarca, province and judicial district.

=== Neighboring localities ===
- Tribunals
- Isuela taverns

== Etymology ==
The toponym Vicién derives from the personal name VET(T)IUS or BET(T)IUS combined with the possessive suffix -én. Other toponyms with the same origin are found in Asturias (Bezanes), Cantabria (Bezana, Santa Cruz de Bezana), Burgos (Bezana, Valle de Valdebezana), Barcelona (Veciana), Italy (Vezzano, Vezzana) and France (Vezzian, Vezzani).
