= Ibón =

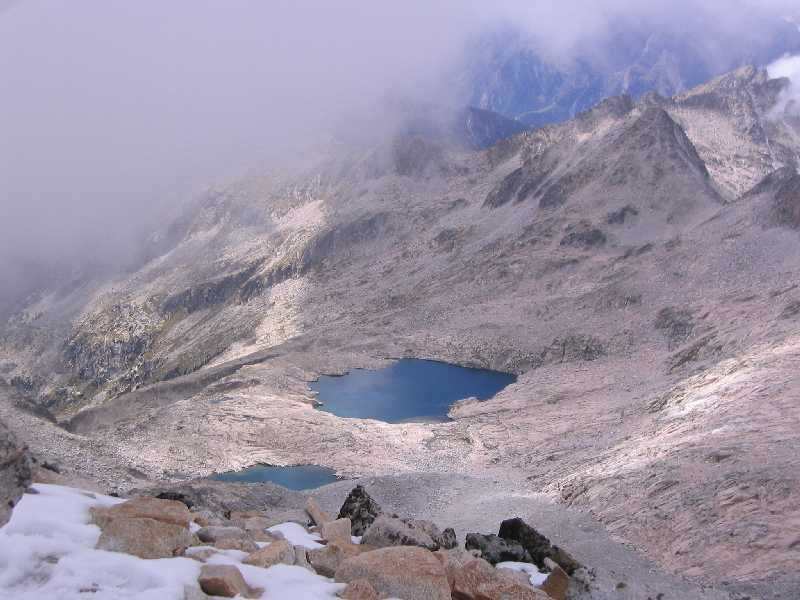
the Ibóns of Coronas from the Aneto summit (3,404 m) in the Spanish Pyrenees

Ibón is the Aragonese term for small mountain lakes of glacial origin in the Pyrenees, generally above 2,000 m. Many of them are the source of watercourses in Aragon.

There are in total 94 ibóns of different shapes and sizes; some of them are used to feed small hydroelectric plants.

The ibóns of Anayet, Sabocos, Ip or Estanés are the most well-known.

== Etymology ==
ibón stems with almost certainty from the basque word ibai (river), which originally designated hot springs.

== Geology ==
As the terrain where lies the spring forms a basin, often caused by the ancient presence of a glacier, these waters form a large or small lake depending on the morphological characteristics of the area.

== Mythology ==
Ibón de Plan or Basa de la Mora is named after a Chistau Valley legend, according to which a Moorish princess fled from battling Moors and Christians, grew lost, with her spirit and soul becoming trapped in the lake. The legend also tells that at dawn on St. John's Day, visitors can wash their faces in the lake and those pure of heart can see a resplendent Moorish woman rise from the waters.

== See also ==
Lakes in the Pyrenees
