= Antillón =

- Municipality and town
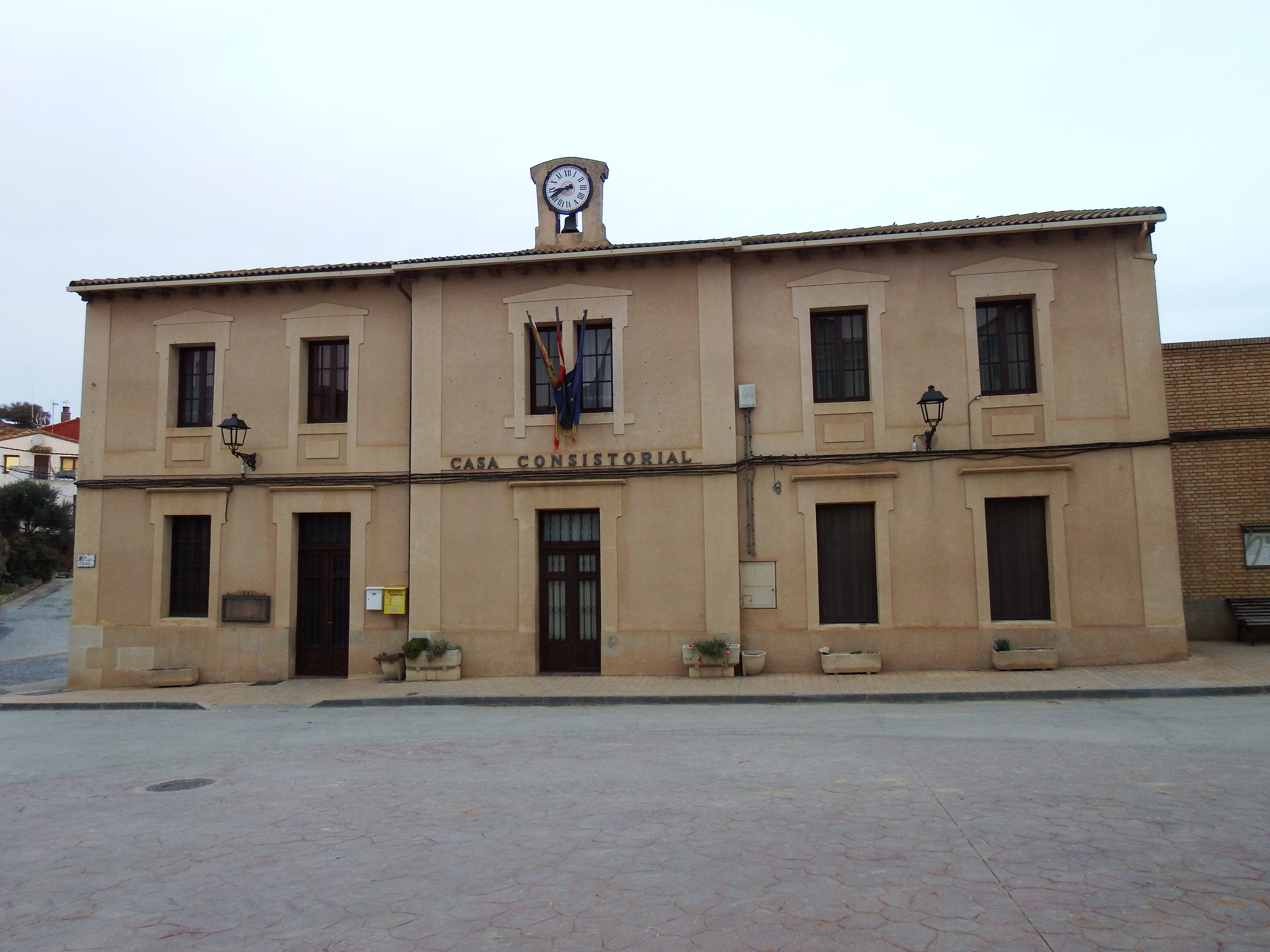
- Town hall

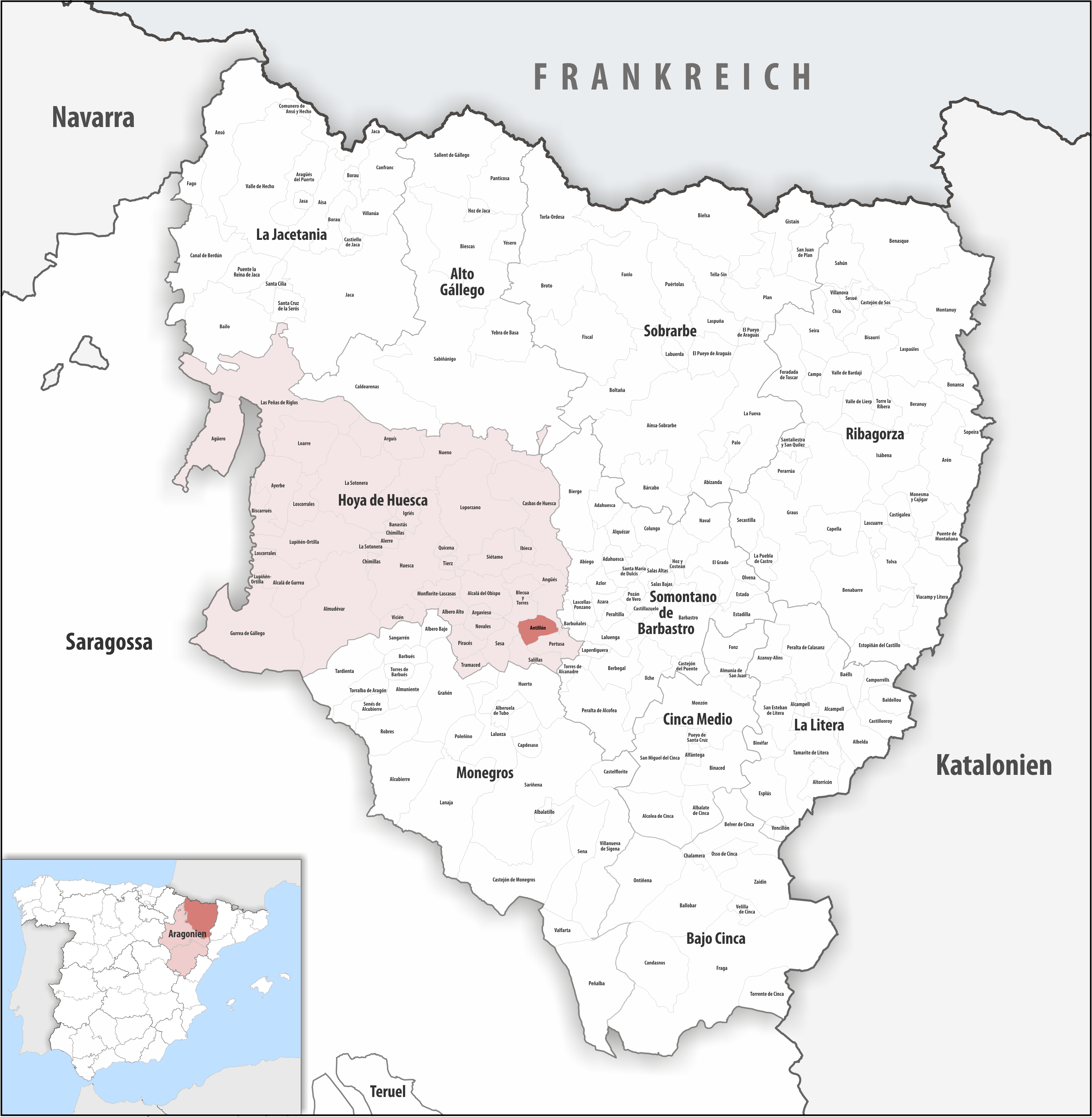
- Municipal location within the Comarca of Hoya de Huesca and Province of Huesca.

- Location in Spain.
- Coordinates: 42°2′N 0°10′W
- Country: Spain
- Autonomous community: Aragon
- Province: Huesca
- Comarca: Hoya de Huesca

Government
  - Mayor: Cristina Benito Layunta

Area
  - Total: 22 km^{2} (8.5 sq mi)

Population (2025-01-01)
  - Total: 127
  - Density: 5.8/km^{2} (15/sq mi)
- Demonym: Antilloneros
- Time zone: UTC+1 ({{{timezone}}}CET)
  - Summer (DST): UTC+2 ({{{timezone_DST}}}CESTCEST)

Antillón is a municipality located in the province of Huesca, Aragon, Spain. As of 2010, (INE), the municipality has a population of 150 inhabitants.

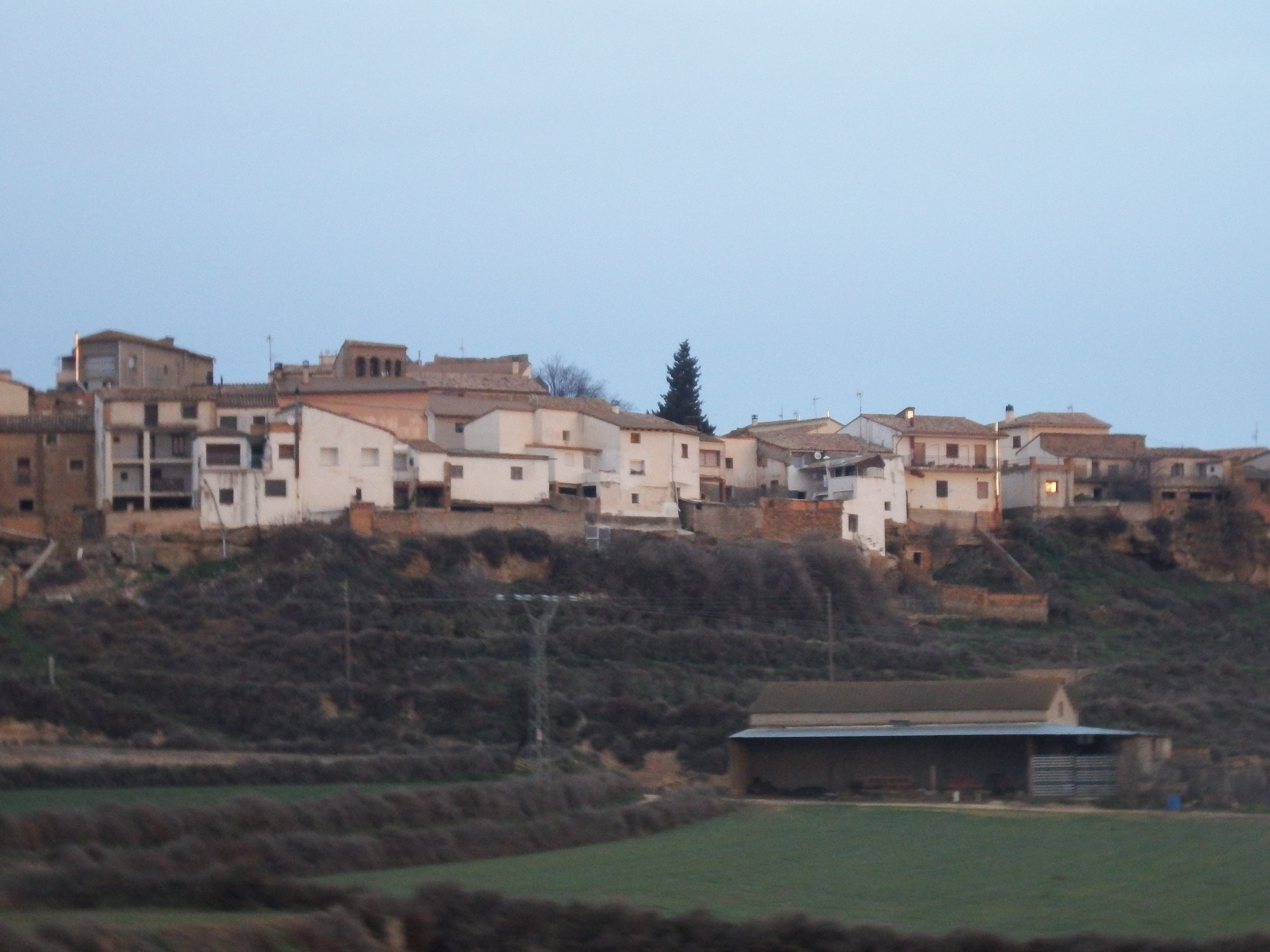

== Notable landmarks ==
The parish church was built between the eleventh and the sixteenth century, so it has parts in Romanesque style, and parts in Gothic. There is also an antique oil manufacturing factory which has been remodeled and can show us how the people of the nineteenth worked.

== See also ==
- List of municipalities in Huesca
