= Agüero, Huesca =

Agüero
- Municipality
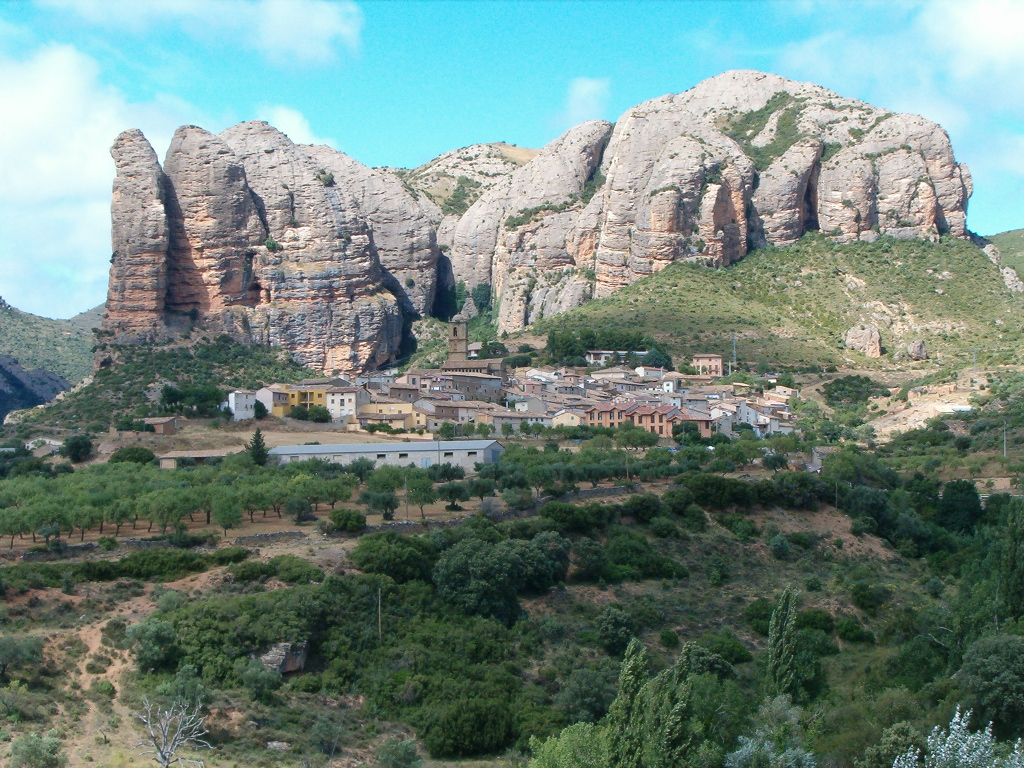

- Flag Coat of arms

- Location of Agüero in Aragon Location of Agüero in Spain
- Coordinates: 42°21′23″N 0°47′35″W
- Country: Spain
- Autonomous community: Aragon
- Province: Huesca
- Comarca: Hoya de Huesca/Plana de Uesca

Area
  - Total: 94.16 km^{2} (36.36 sq mi)
- Elevation: 696 m (2,283 ft)

Population (2025-01-01)
  - Total: 142
  - Density: 1.51/km^{2} (3.91/sq mi)
- Time zone: UTC+1 (CET)
  - Summer (DST): UTC+2 (CEST)

Agüero is a village and a municipality located in the province of Huesca in the autonomous community of Aragon in Spain. It has 142 inhabitants.

Its postal code is 22808. There are two churches in the village (Santiago and San Salvador). The 12th-century Santiago church is the main attraction in the village proper. There is also a small hotel in the village.

The Mallos de Agüero rock formations rise more than 200 m (660 ft) above the village, giving it a picturesque look. The Mallos are popular with mountain climbers and abseilers.

== Demographics ==
Historical population

Year	Pop.	±%
1842	495	—
1857	1,176	+137.6%
1877	1,197	+1.8%
1887	1,251	+4.5%
1900	1,182	−5.5%
1910	1,253	+6.0%
1920	1,177	−6.1%
1930	1,084	−7.9%
1940	1,007	−7.1%

Year	Pop.	±%
1950	785	−22.0%
1960	504	−35.8%
1970	303	−39.9%
1981	238	−21.5%
1991	168	−29.4%
2001	171	+1.8%
2011	156	−8.8%
2021	139	−10.9%

Source: INE

== See also ==
- List of municipalities in Huesca

== Bibliography ==
- Antonio Ubieto Arteta, "Historia de Aragón". Los pueblos y los despoblados 1 (Ed. Anubar. Zaragoza, 1984)
