= Blecua y Torres =

- municipality
- Location within Aragon Location within Spain
- Coordinates: 42°3′26″N 0°11′13″W
- Country: Spain
- Autonomous community: Aragon
- Province: Huesca

Area
  - Total: 36.20 km^{2} (13.98 sq mi)
- Elevation: 465 m (1,526 ft)

Population (2025-01-01)
  - Total: 175
  - Density: 4.83/km^{2} (12.5/sq mi)
- Time zone: UTC+1 (CET)
  - Summer (DST): UTC+2 (CEST)

Blecua y Torres is a municipality located in the province of Huesca, Aragon, Spain. According to the 2009 census (INE), the municipality has a population of 189 inhabitants.

== See also ==
- List of municipalities in Huesca
