= Tramaced =

Coordinates: 41°58′N 0°18′W

- municipality
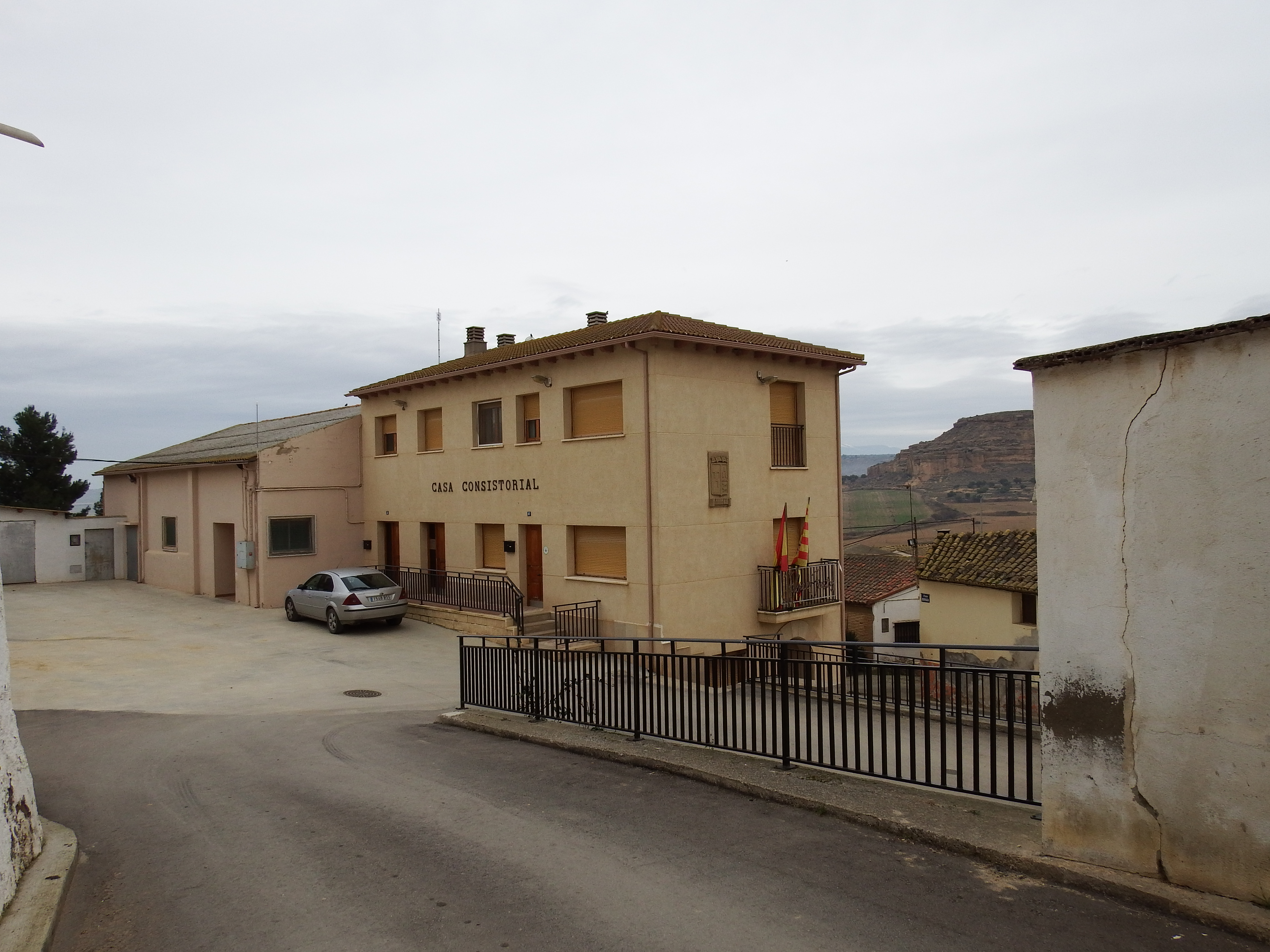
- Tramaced Town Hall

- Coat of arms
- Interactive map of Tramaced
- Country: Spain
- Autonomous community: Aragon
- Province: Huesca

Area
  - Total: 15 km^{2} (5.8 sq mi)

Population (2025-01-01)
  - Total: 108
  - Density: 7.2/km^{2} (19/sq mi)
- Time zone: UTC+1 (CET)
  - Summer (DST): UTC+2 (CEST)

Tramaced is a municipality located in the province of Huesca, Aragon, Spain. According to the 2004 census (INE), the municipality has a population of 108 inhabitants.

== See also ==
- List of municipalities in Huesca
