= Quicena =

Municipality of Spain

Coordinates: 42°09′N 0°22′W

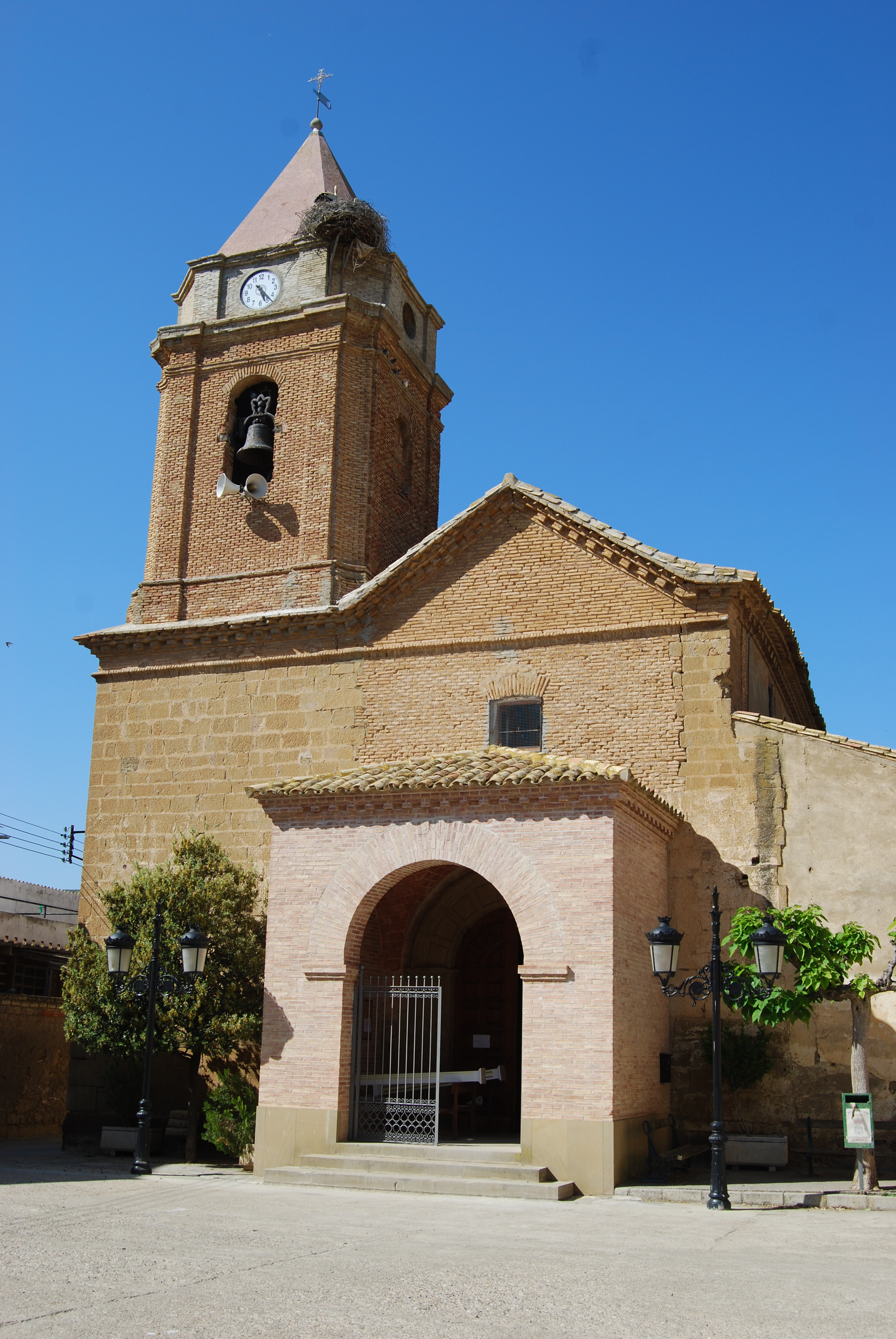
Church of Asunción

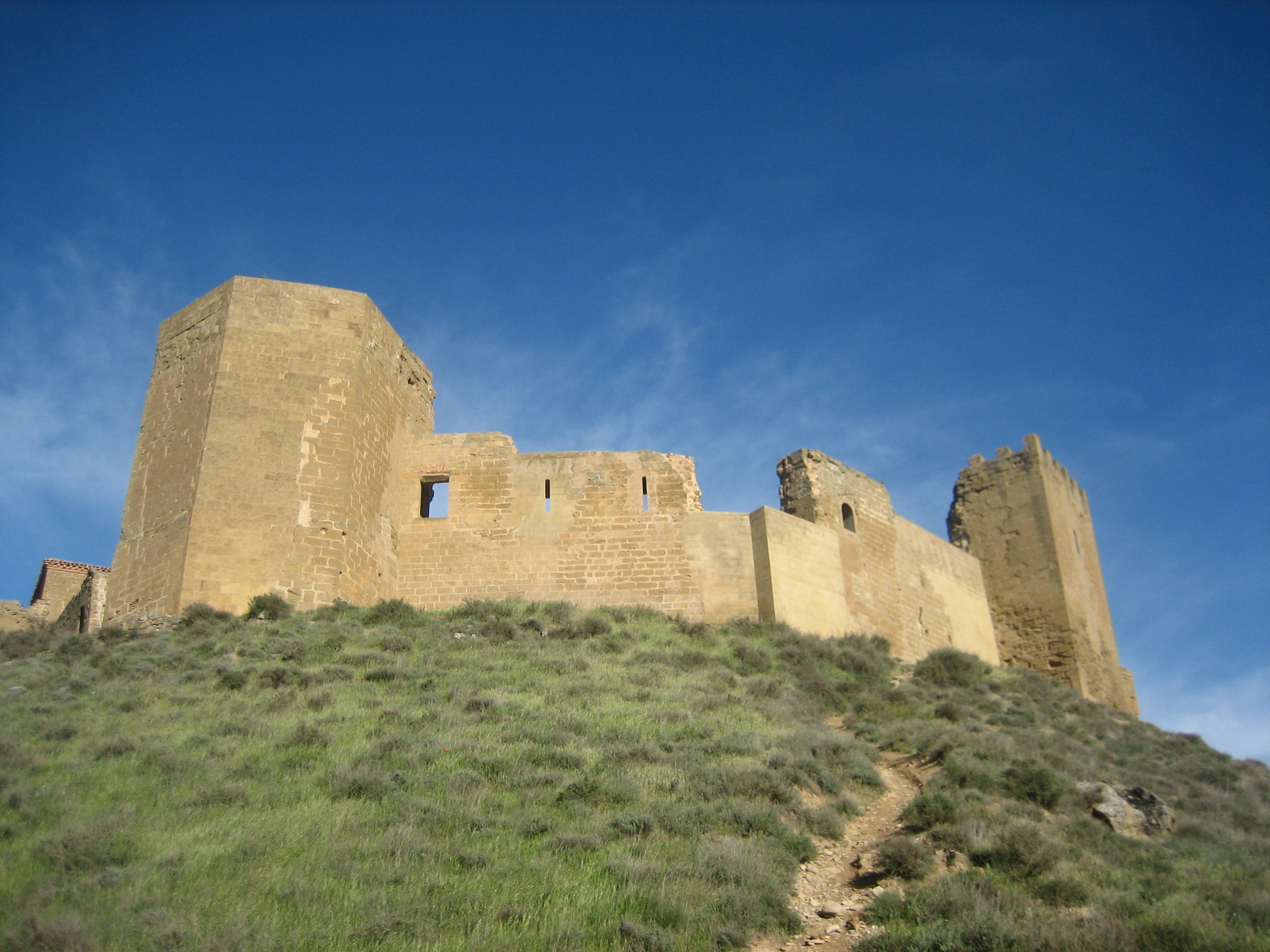
Castillo de Montearagón

Quicena's flag

Quicena's coat of arms

Quicena is a municipality in the province of Huesca, Spain. As of 2023, it has a population of 329.

== Main sights ==
- Church of Asunción
- Hermitage of San Pedro
- Castle of Montearagón
- An old bridge over Flumen river
- A Roman aqueduct
