= Vezzano =

Vezzano refers to several towns in Italy:

- Vezzano, Trentino
- Vezzano Ligure
- Vezzano sul Crostolo
