= Ibón de Estanés =

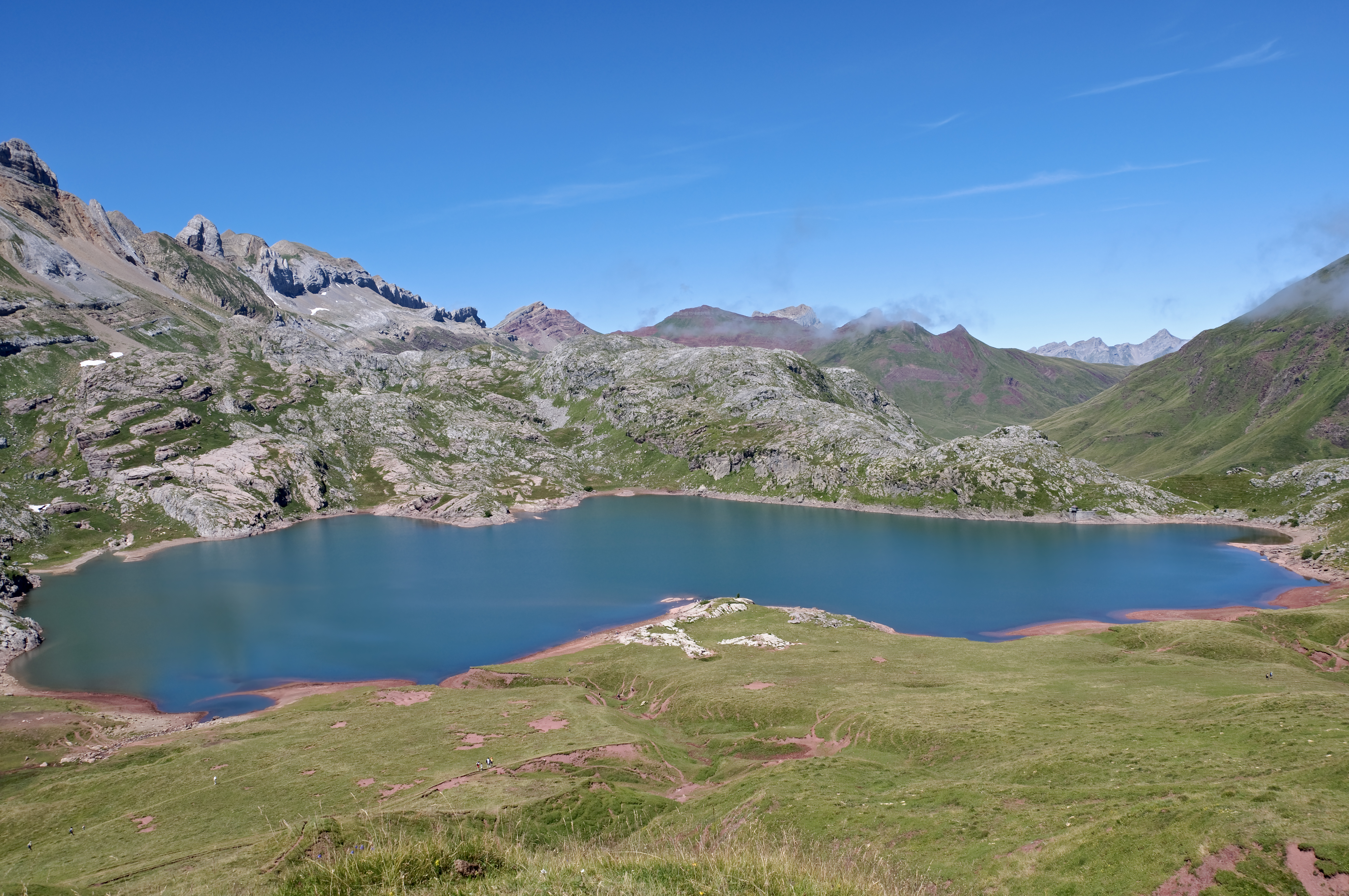

- Location within Spain
- Location: Province of Huesca, northeastern Spain
- Coordinates: 42°48′N 0°35′W
- Type: lake
- Surface elevation: 1,754 metres (5,755 ft)

Ibón de Estanés is a lake in the Province of Huesca, northeastern Spain. Located at an elevation of 1,754 metres (5,755 ft) in the Valle de Hecho, it covers an area of 0.29 square kilometres (0.11 sq mi).
