= Tierz =

Municipality of Spain

Coordinates: 42°08′N 0°21′W

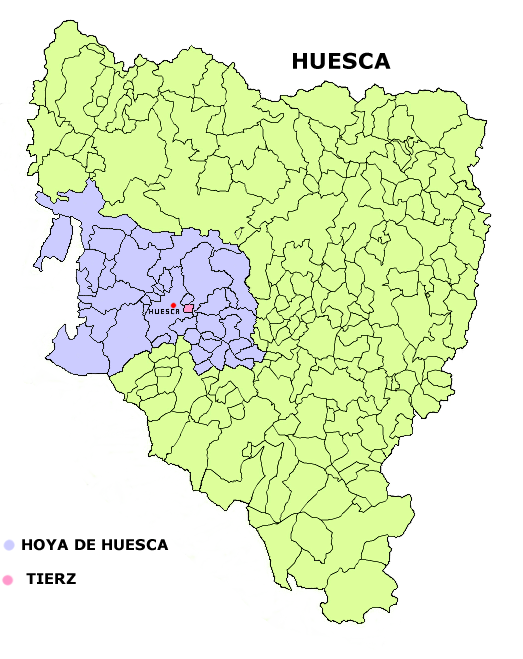

Tierz's flag

Tierz's coat of arms

Tierz is a municipality in the province of Huesca, Spain. As of 2010, it has a population of 691 inhabitants.

== Main sights ==
- Church of Nuestra Señora de la Asunción
- Hermitage of Nuestra Señora de los Dolores
