= Argavieso, Huesca =

Huesca
- municipality
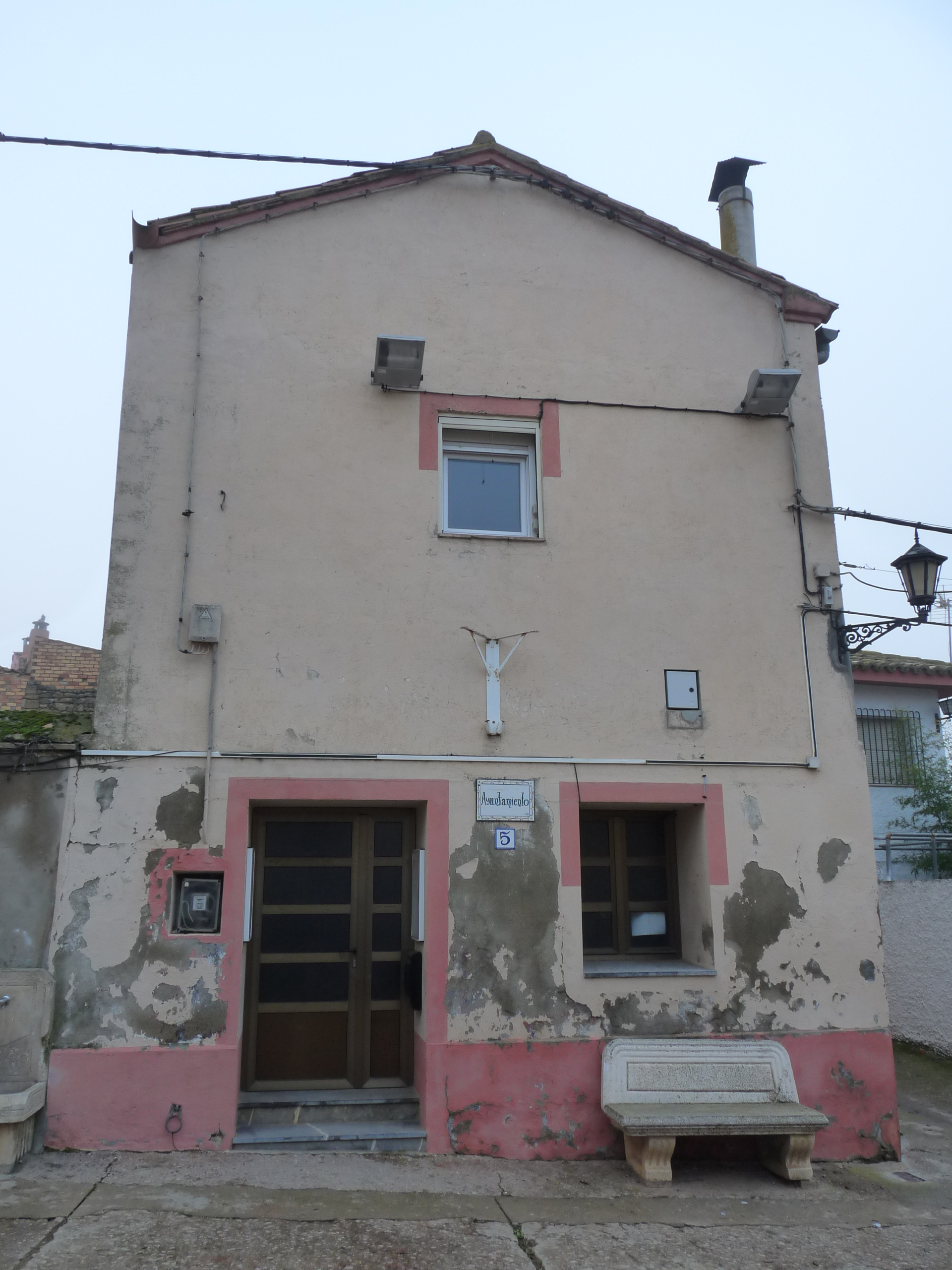
- Town hall

- Location in Spain
- Coordinates: 42°03′N 0°17′W
- Country: Spain
- Autonomous community: Aragon
- Province: Huesca
- Comarca: Hoya de Huesca

Government
  - Mayor: Mónica Soler Navarro (People's Party of Aragon)

Area
  - Total: 9.7 km^{2} (3.7 sq mi)
- Elevation: 481 m (1,578 ft)

Population (2025-01-01)
  - Total: 109
  - Density: 11/km^{2} (29/sq mi)
- Time zone: UTC+1
  - Summer (DST): UTC+2 (CEST)
- Postal code: 22135
- Website: www.argavieso.es

Argavieso is a municipality in the province of Huesca, Spain. As of 2010, it has a population of 119 inhabitants.

== See also ==
- List of municipalities in Huesca
