= Arguis =

Municipality in Huesca, Aragon, Spain

Coordinates: 42°19′N 0°26′W

- municipality
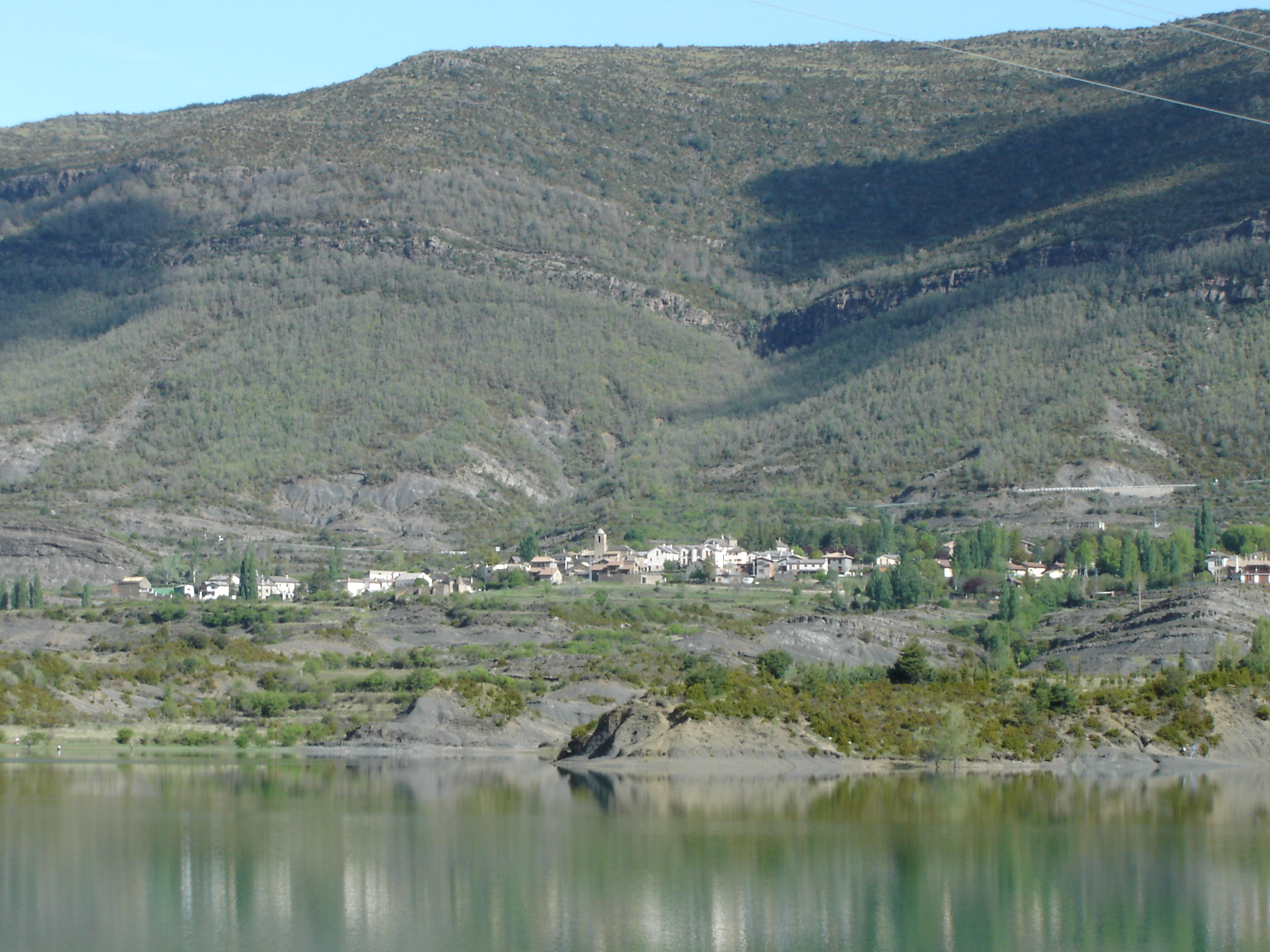
- Interactive map of Arguis
- Country: Spain
- Autonomous community: Aragon
- Province: Huesca
- Municipality: Arguis

Area
  - Total: 62.80 km^{2} (24.25 sq mi)

Population (2025-01-01)
  - Total: 167
  - Density: 2.66/km^{2} (6.89/sq mi)
- Time zone: UTC+1 (CET)
  - Summer (DST): UTC+2 (CEST)

Arguis is a municipality located in the province of Huesca, Aragon, Spain. According to the 2004 census (INE), the municipality had a population of 61 inhabitants.

The Master of Arguis derives his name from a painting which once hung in the town church.

The municipality includes the village Bentué de Rasal.

== See also ==
- List of municipalities in Huesca
