= Salillas =

Coordinates: 42°00′N 0°13′W

- municipality
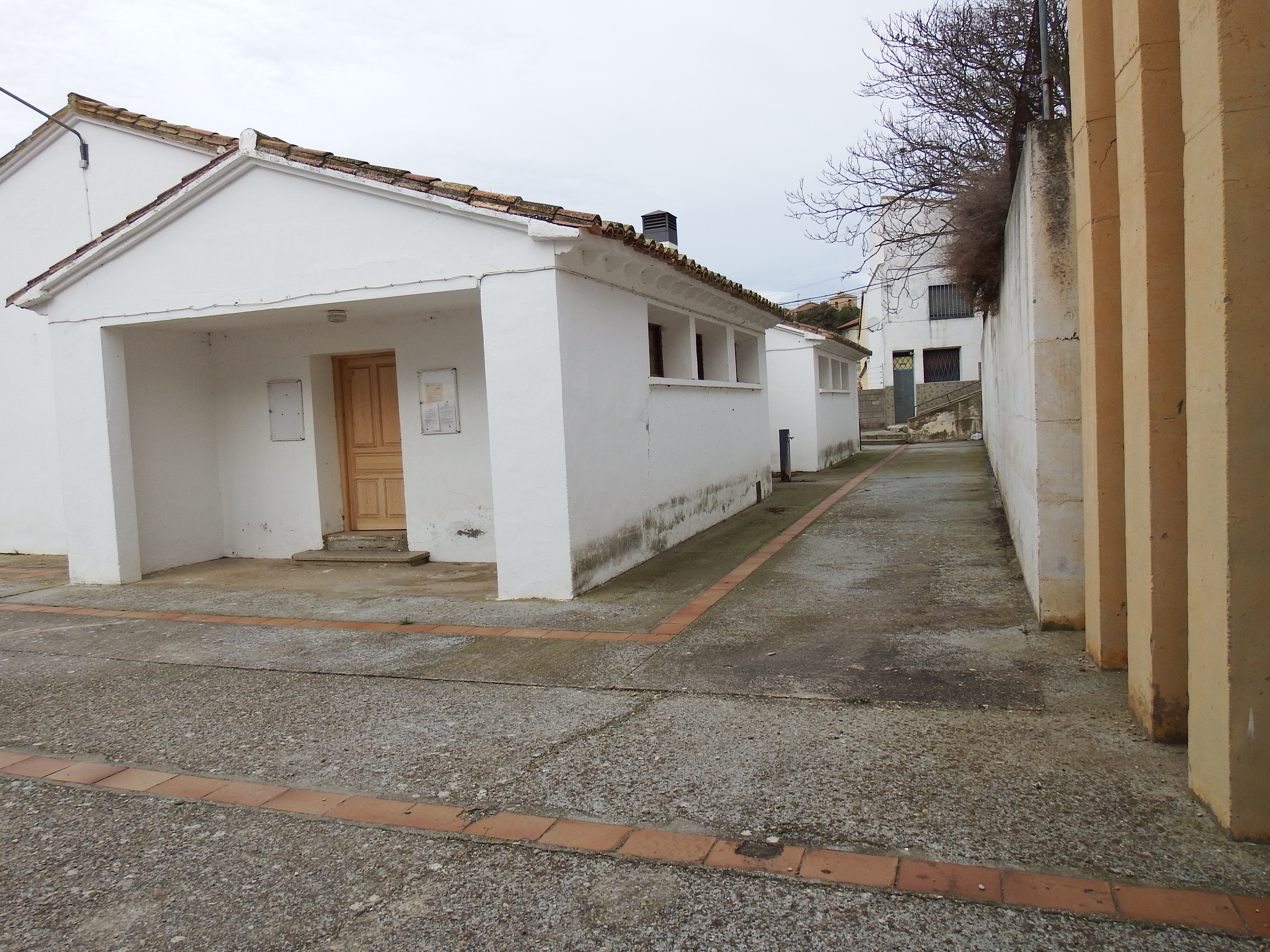
- Town hall
- Interactive map of Salillas
- Country: Spain
- Autonomous community: Aragon
- Province: Huesca
- Municipality: Salillas

Area
  - Total: 28 km^{2} (11 sq mi)

Population (2025-01-01)
  - Total: 94
  - Density: 3.4/km^{2} (8.7/sq mi)
- Time zone: UTC+1 (CET)
  - Summer (DST): UTC+2 (CEST)

Salillas is a municipality located in the province of Huesca, Aragon, Spain. According to the 2004 census (INE), the municipality has a population of 115 inhabitants.

== See also ==
- List of municipalities in Huesca
