= Loscorrales =

Coordinates: 42°15′N 0°38′W

Loscorrales Os Corrals
- municipality
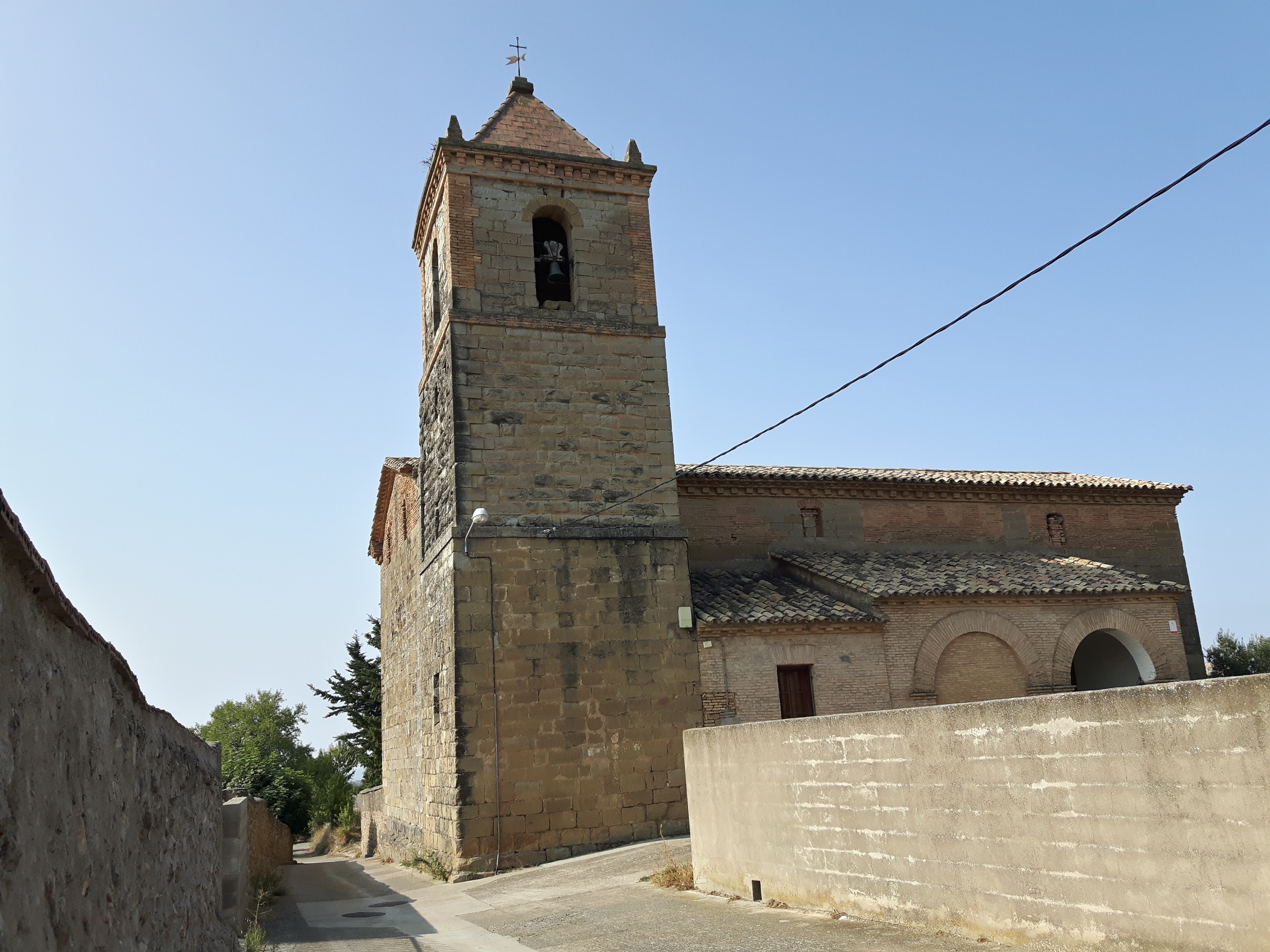
- Interactive map of Loscorrales
- Country: Spain
- Autonomous community: Aragon
- Province: Huesca
- Municipality: Loscorrales

Area
  - Total: 40 km^{2} (15 sq mi)

Population (2025-01-01)
  - Total: 98
  - Density: 2.5/km^{2} (6.3/sq mi)
- Time zone: UTC+1 (CET)
  - Summer (DST): UTC+2 (CEST)

Loscorrales (Aragonese Os Corrals) is a municipality located in the province of Huesca, Aragon, Spain. According to the 2004 census (INE), the municipality has a population of 113 inhabitants.

== See also ==
- List of municipalities in Huesca
