= Sesa, Spain =

Coordinates: 42°59′52″N 00°14′40″W

Sesa
- municipality
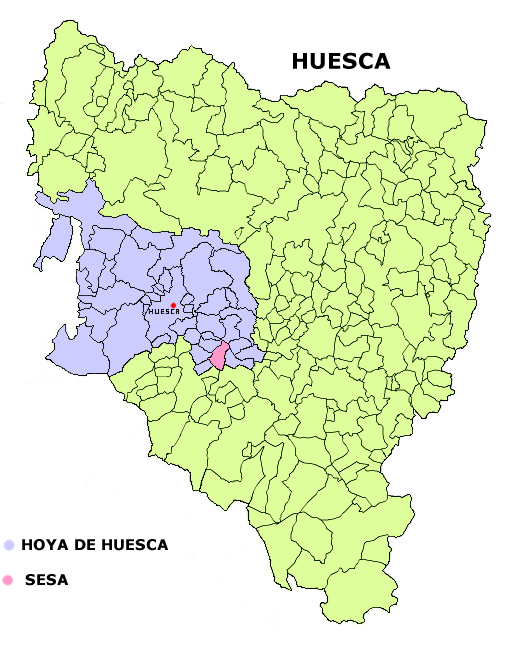
- Country: Spain
- Autonomous community: Aragon
- Province: Huesca
- Comarca: Hoya de Huesca

Area
  - Total: 30.73 km^{2} (11.86 sq mi)
- Elevation: 437 m (1,434 ft)

Population (2025-01-01)
  - Total: 167
- Demonym(s): Seseno, Sesena
- Time zone: UTC+1 (CET)
  - Summer (DST): UTC+2 (CEST)

Name of Sesa (Sesars) in the ancient Iberian script

Sesa is a municipality located in the Hoya de Huesca comarca, province of Huesca, Aragon, Spain. According to the 2010 census the municipality has a population of 225 inhabitants. Its postal code is 22110.

There is a church in Sesa, the church of San Juan Bautista, and the hermitage of Nuestra Señora de la Jarea is also found in the village. Both date back to the 12th century. There is an ancient Iberian archaeological site at a place known as "El Portillo", located within Sesa's municipal territory. In the Middle Ages there was an important castle in Sesa.

== See also ==
- List of municipalities in Huesca
