= Albero Alto =

Municipality in Aragon, Spain

Coordinates: 42°03′N 0°20′W

Albero Alto Albero d'Alto
- municipality
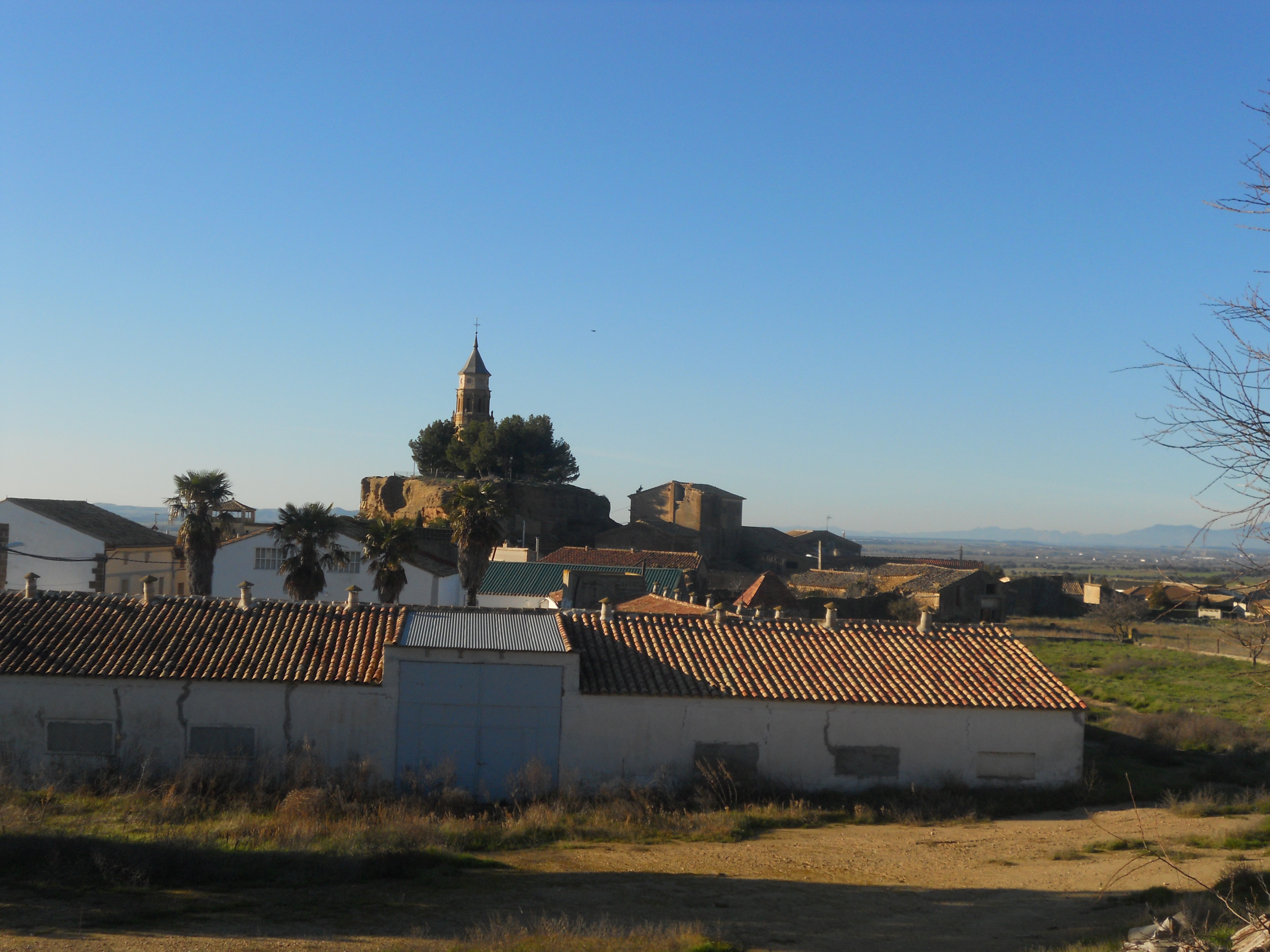

- Coat of arms

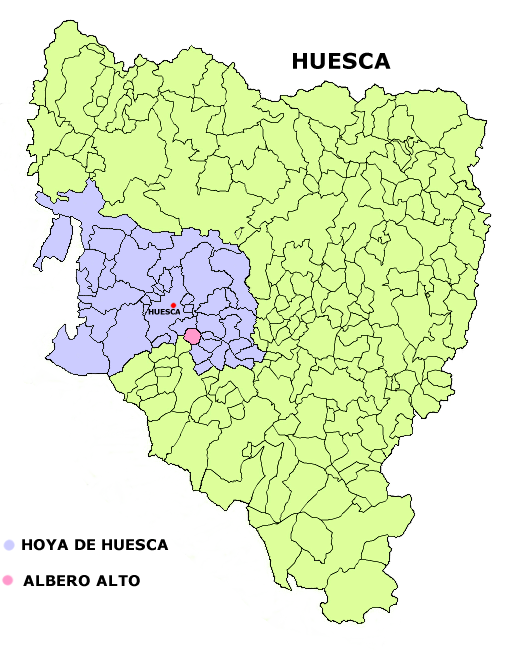
- Country: Spain
- Autonomous community: Aragon
- Province: Huesca
- Comarca: Hoya de Huesca

Area
  - Total: 19.28 km^{2} (7.44 sq mi)
- Elevation: 442 m (1,450 ft)

Population (2025-01-01)
  - Total: 123
  - Density: 6.38/km^{2} (16.5/sq mi)
- Time zone: UTC+1
  - Summer (DST): UTC+2 (CEST)

Albero Alto (Aragonese Albero d'Alto) is a municipality in the province of Huesca, Spain. As of 2010, it has a population of 132 inhabitants.

== See also ==
- List of municipalities in Huesca
