= Angüés =

Coordinates: 42°07′N 0°09′W

Angüés, Spain
- Interactive map of Angüés, Spain
- Country: Spain
- Autonomous community: Aragon
- Province: Huesca
- Municipality: Angüés

Area
  - Total: 56 km^{2} (22 sq mi)

Population (2025-01-01)
  - Total: 350
  - Density: 6.2/km^{2} (16/sq mi)
- Time zone: UTC+1 (CET)
  - Summer (DST): UTC+2 (CEST)

Angüés is a municipality located in the province of Huesca, Aragon, Spain. According to the 2018 census (INE), the municipality has a population of 367 inhabitants.

== See also ==
- List of municipalities in Huesca
