= Pertusa (Spain) =

Coordinates: 42°00′N 0°08′W

- municipality
- Flag Coat of arms
- Interactive map of Pertusa
- Country: Spain
- Autonomous community: Aragon
- Province: Huesca

Area
  - Total: 29 km^{2} (11 sq mi)

Population (2025-01-01)
  - Total: 129
  - Density: 4.4/km^{2} (12/sq mi)
- Time zone: UTC+1 (CET)
  - Summer (DST): UTC+2 (CEST)

Pertusa is a municipality located in the province of Huesca, Aragon, Spain.

According to the 2025 census (INE), the municipality has a population of 129 inhabitants.

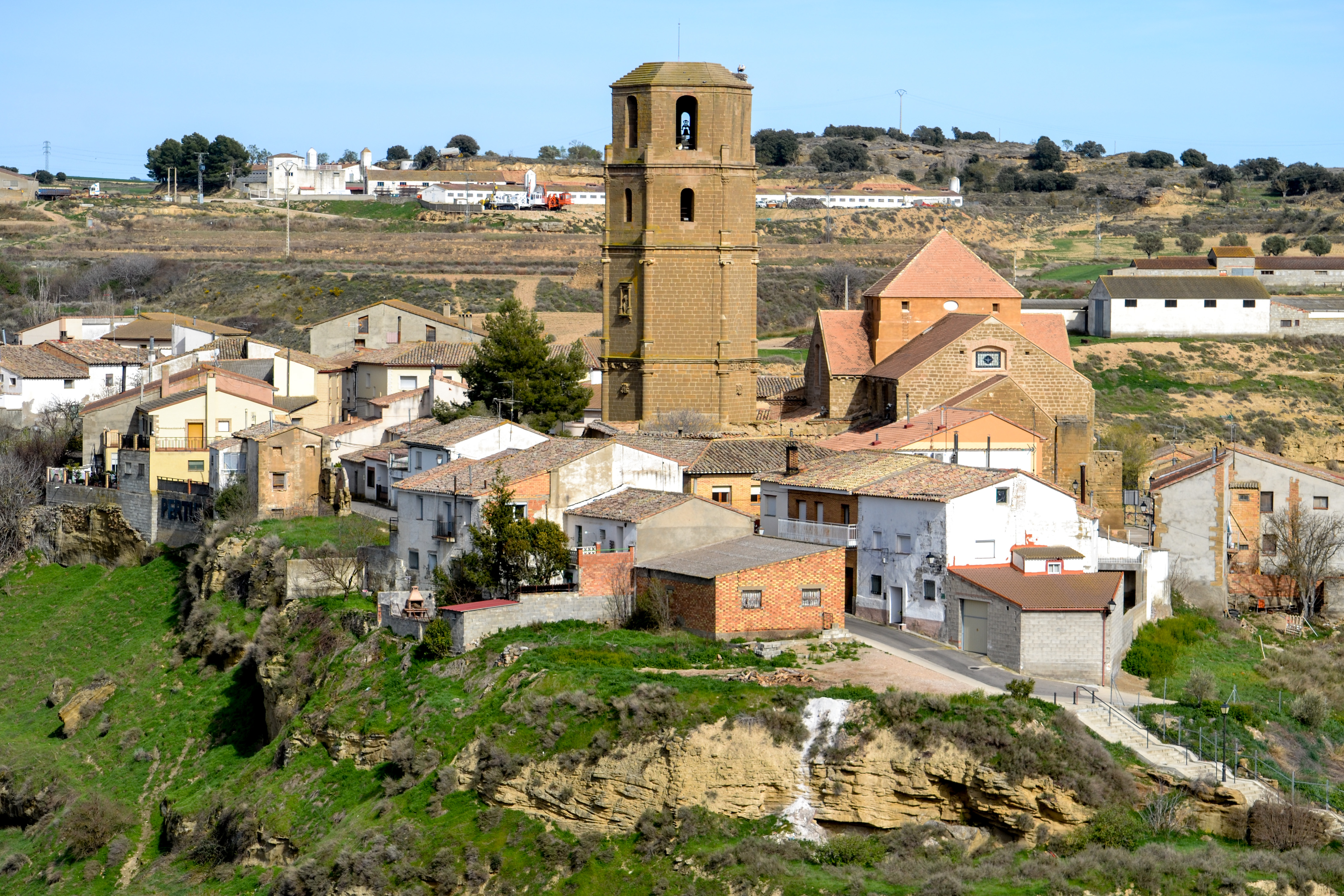
View of Pertusa

== History ==
Pertusa was an Ilergetes settlement, known only under the same name, which was given under Roman rule.

== See also ==
- List of municipalities in Huesca
