= Alcalá del Obispo =

Coordinates: 42°05′N 0°17′W

Alcalá del Obispo Alcalá d'o Bispe
- municipality
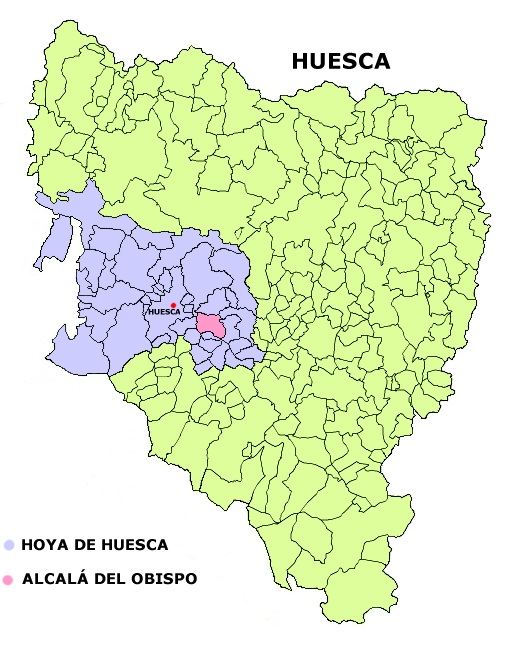
- Country: Spain
- Autonomous community: Aragon
- Province: Huesca
- Comarca: Hoya de Huesca

Area
  - Total: 47.5 km^{2} (18.3 sq mi)
- Elevation: 517 m (1,696 ft)

Population (2025-01-01)
  - Total: 394
  - Density: 8.29/km^{2} (21.5/sq mi)
- Time zone: UTC+1
  - Summer (DST): UTC+2 (CEST)

Alcalá del Obispo (Aragonese Alcalá d'o Bispe) is a municipality in the province of Huesca, Spain. As of 2016, it has a population of 340 inhabitants.

== See also ==
- List of municipalities in Huesca
