= Santa Eulalia de Gállego =

Coordinates: 42°17′N 0°46′W

Santa Eulalia de Gállego, Spain
- Flag Coat of arms
- Interactive map of Santa Eulalia de Gállego, Spain
- Country: Spain
- Autonomous community: Aragon
- Province: Zaragoza
- Municipality: Santa Eulalia de Gállego

Area
  - Total: 29 km^{2} (11 sq mi)

Population (2025-01-01)
  - Total: 101
  - Density: 3.5/km^{2} (9.0/sq mi)
- Time zone: UTC+1 (CET)
  - Summer (DST): UTC+2 (CEST)

Santa Eulalia de Gállego is a municipality located in the province of Zaragoza, Aragon, Spain. According to the 2004 census (INE), the municipality has a population of 134 inhabitants.

== See also ==
- List of municipalities in Zaragoza
