= Murillo de Gállego =

Murillo de Gállego, Spain
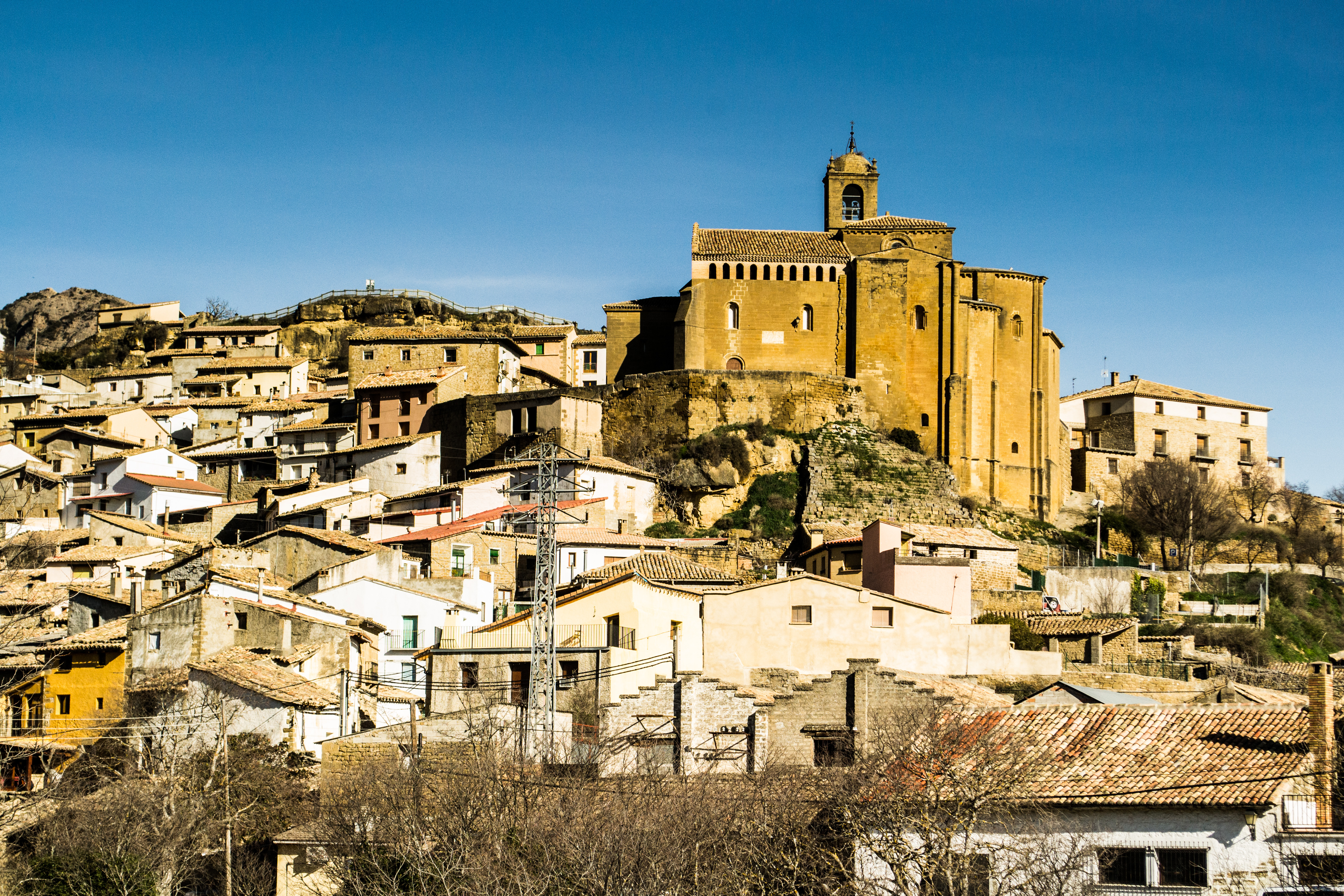

- Flag Coat of arms

- Location within Aragon Location within Spain Location within Europe
- Coordinates: 42°20′N 0°45′W
- Country: Spain
- Autonomous community: Aragon
- Province: Zaragoza
- Municipality: Murillo de Gállego

Area
  - Total: 54 km^{2} (21 sq mi)

Population (2025-01-01)
  - Total: 194
  - Density: 3.6/km^{2} (9.3/sq mi)
- Time zone: UTC+1 (CET)
  - Summer (DST): UTC+2 (CEST)

Murillo de Gállego is a municipality located in the province of Zaragoza, Aragon, Spain. According to the 2004 census (INE), the municipality has a population of 182 inhabitants.

== See also ==
- List of municipalities in Zaragoza
