= Somontano de Barbastro =

Coordinates: 42°02′00″N 00°07′00″W

- Comarca
- Country: Spain
- Autonomous community: Aragon
- Province: Huesca
- Capital: Barbastro
- Municipalities: List: See text

Area
  - Total: 1,166.60 km^{2} (450.43 sq mi)

Population (2007)
  - Total: 23,464
  - Density: 20.113/km^{2} (52.093/sq mi)
- Time zone: UTC+1 (CET)
  - Summer (DST): UTC+2 (CEST)

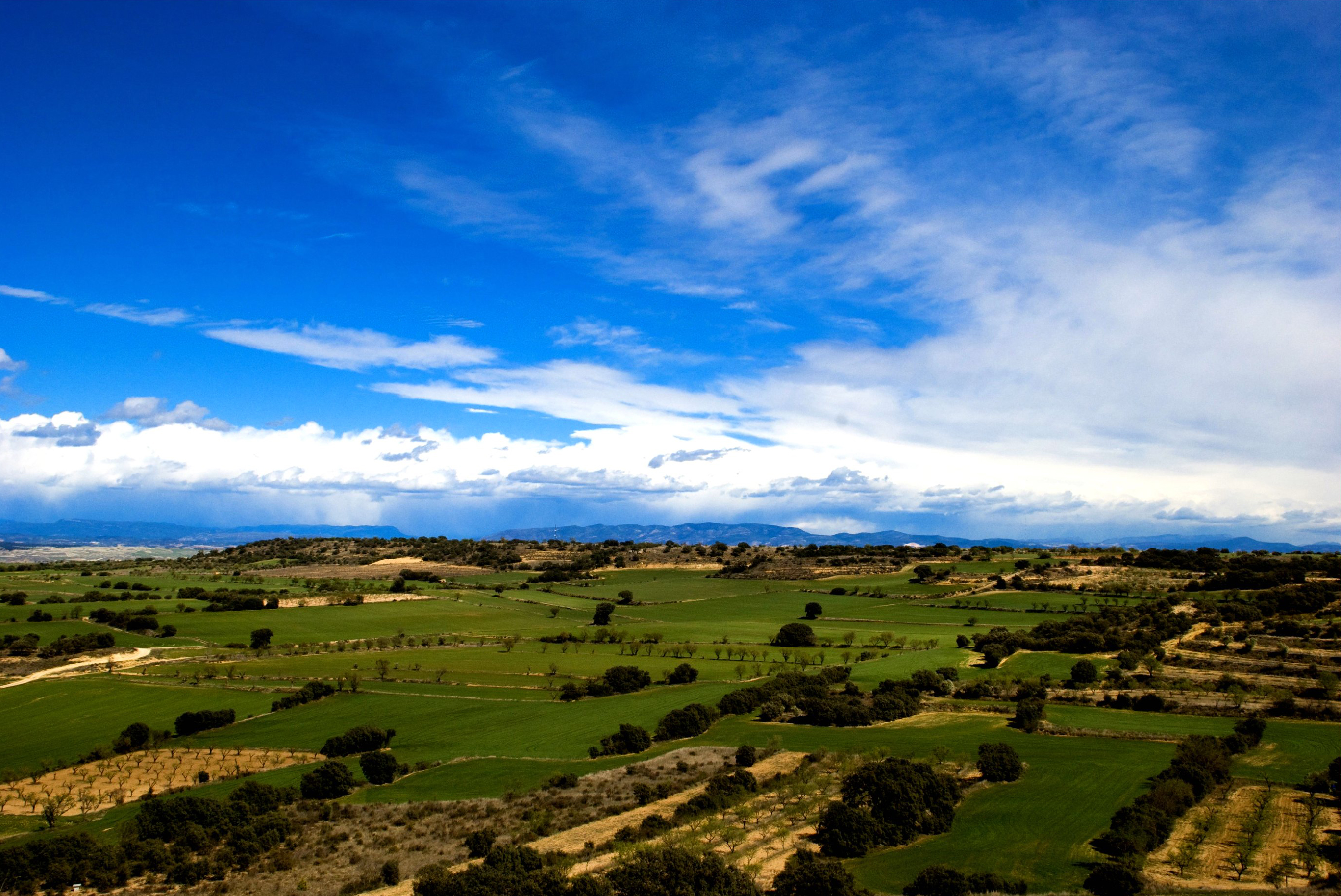
View of Somontano de Barbastro from Lagunarrota

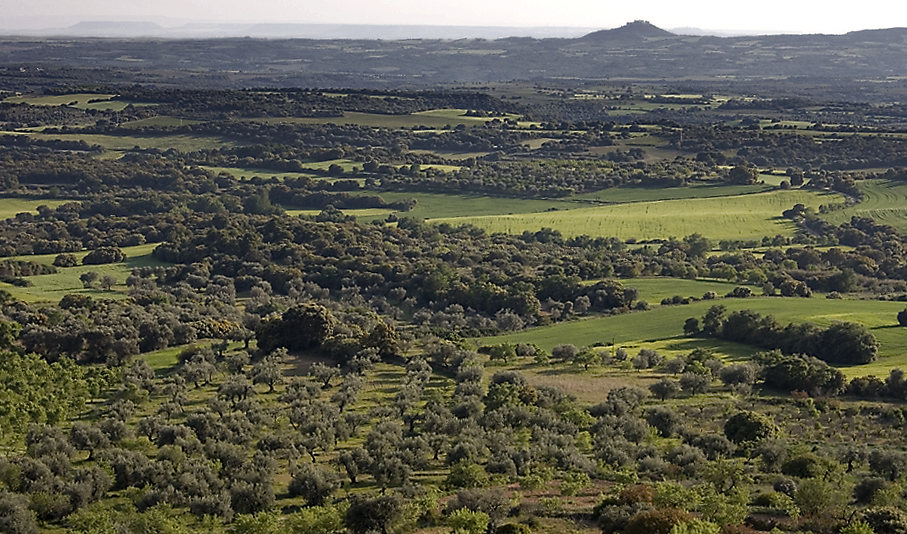
Somontano

Somontano de Barbastro (Aragonese: Semontano de Balbastro) is a comarca in Province of Huesca, Aragon, Spain.

Somontano borders the comarcas of Sobrarbe and Alto Gállego to the north, Ribagorza and La Litera to the east, Cinca Medio to the southwest, the Monegros desert to the south and Hoya de Huesca to the west.

As its Latin name suggests, Somontano, meaning "beneath the mountain", lies at the foothills of the Pyrenees. The area is abundantly irrigated by four important rivers which flow down from the north: the Alcanadre, Cinca, Ésera and the river Vero.

The primary economy of the area has always been agricultural and livestock farming based. Wheat and grains, as well as olives are the primary crops. Its wine production received a denominación de origen in 1984. The city of Barbastro, home to about 85% of the population of the comarca, is a regional hub for the food industry, construction and chemical industry.

The area is also home to the Sierra de Guara, a vast Open Space preserve with canyons and gorges and over 60 limestone caves with prehistoric cave paintings, which led UNESCO to declare it as a World Heritage Site in 1998.

== Municipalities ==
- Abiego
- Adahuesca
- Alquézar
- Azara
- Azlor
- Barbastro
- Barbuñales
- Berbegal
- Bierge
- Castejón del Puente
- Castillazuelo
- Colungo
- Estada
- Estadilla
- El Grado
- Hoz y Costean
- Ilche
- Laluenga
- Laperdiguera
- Lascellas-Ponzano
- Naval
- Olvena
- Peralta de Alcofea
- Peraltilla
- Pozán de Vero
- Salas Altas
- Salas Bajas
- Santa María de Dulcis
- Torres de Alcanadre

== See also ==
- Somontano D.O. wine area
