= Cinqueta =

Spanish river

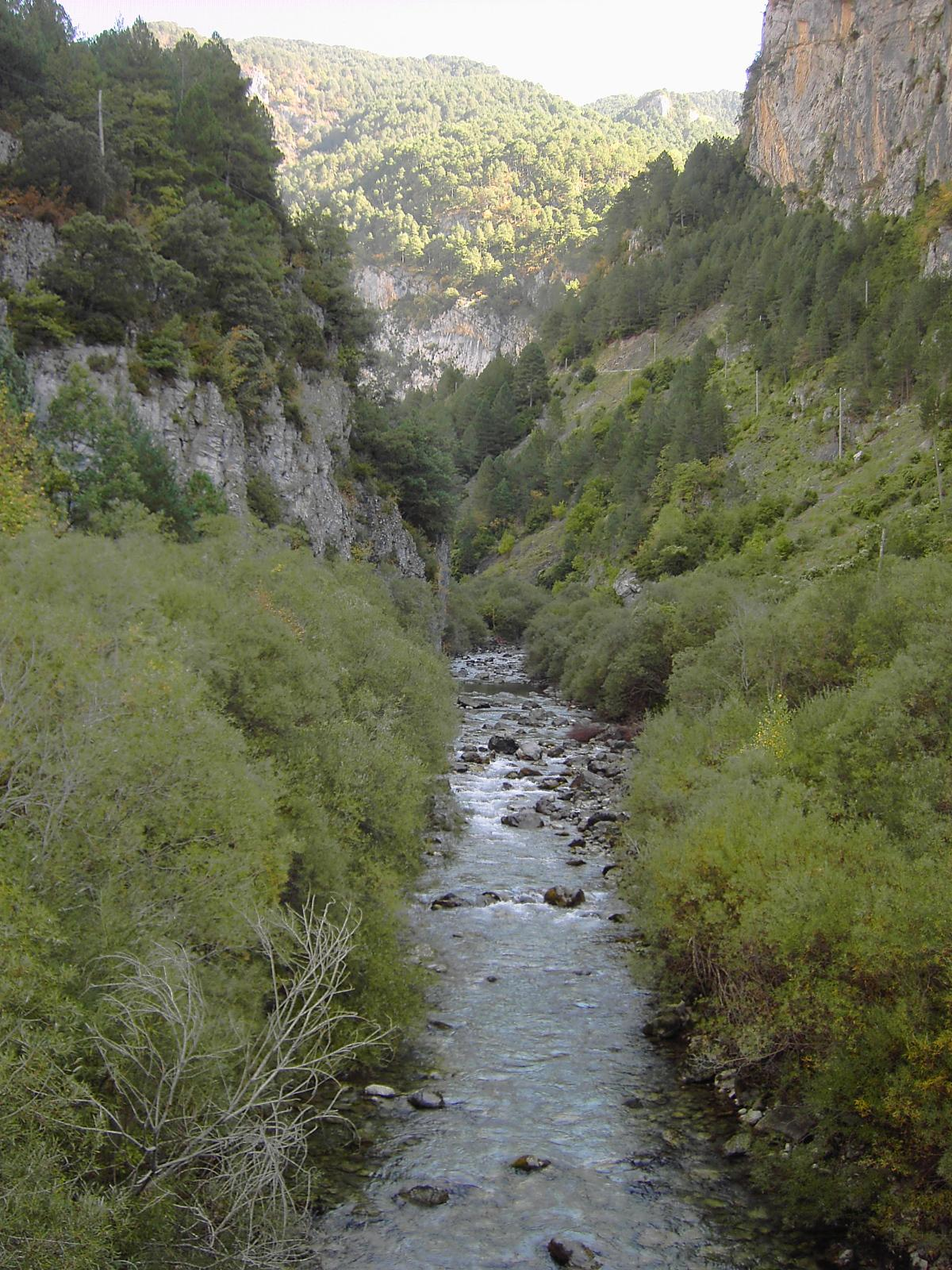
- The Cinqueta near Saravillo.

Location
- Country: Spain
- Region: Aragon

Physical characteristics
- Mouth
  - coordinates: 42°35′00″N 0°13′25″E
- Length: 785 m (2,575 ft)

The Cinqueta (Aragonese: Zinqueta) is a river in the Pyrenees tributary to the left bank of the river Cinca. It mainly runs through the Gistau valley, in Sobrarbe (Huesca). The river begins in the Viadós where the Cinqueta de la Pez meets with the Cinqueta de los Anyes Cruces, in the municipality of Gistaín. Afterwards, it travels through three places in the valley (Gistaín, San Juan de Plan and Plan), it then leaves the valley and travels towards Salinas de la Sin, where it empties out in the Cinca near Bielsa.
