= Gurrea =

Gurrea or Gurréa may refer to:

People

- Carlos de Gurrea, Duke of Villahermosa (1634–1692), 9th Duque de Villahermosa, a Spanish nobleman, viceroy and governor
- Ignacio de Luzán Claramunt de Suelves y Gurrea (1702–1754), Spanish critic and poet
- Marcial del Adalid y Gurréa (1826–1881), Spanish composer

Places

- Alcalá de Gurrea, municipality in the province of Huesca, Aragon, Spain
- Gurrea de Gállego, municipality in the province of Huesca, Aragon, Spain
