= Cachirulo =

Traditional Aragonese men's handkerchief, worn folded and tied around the head

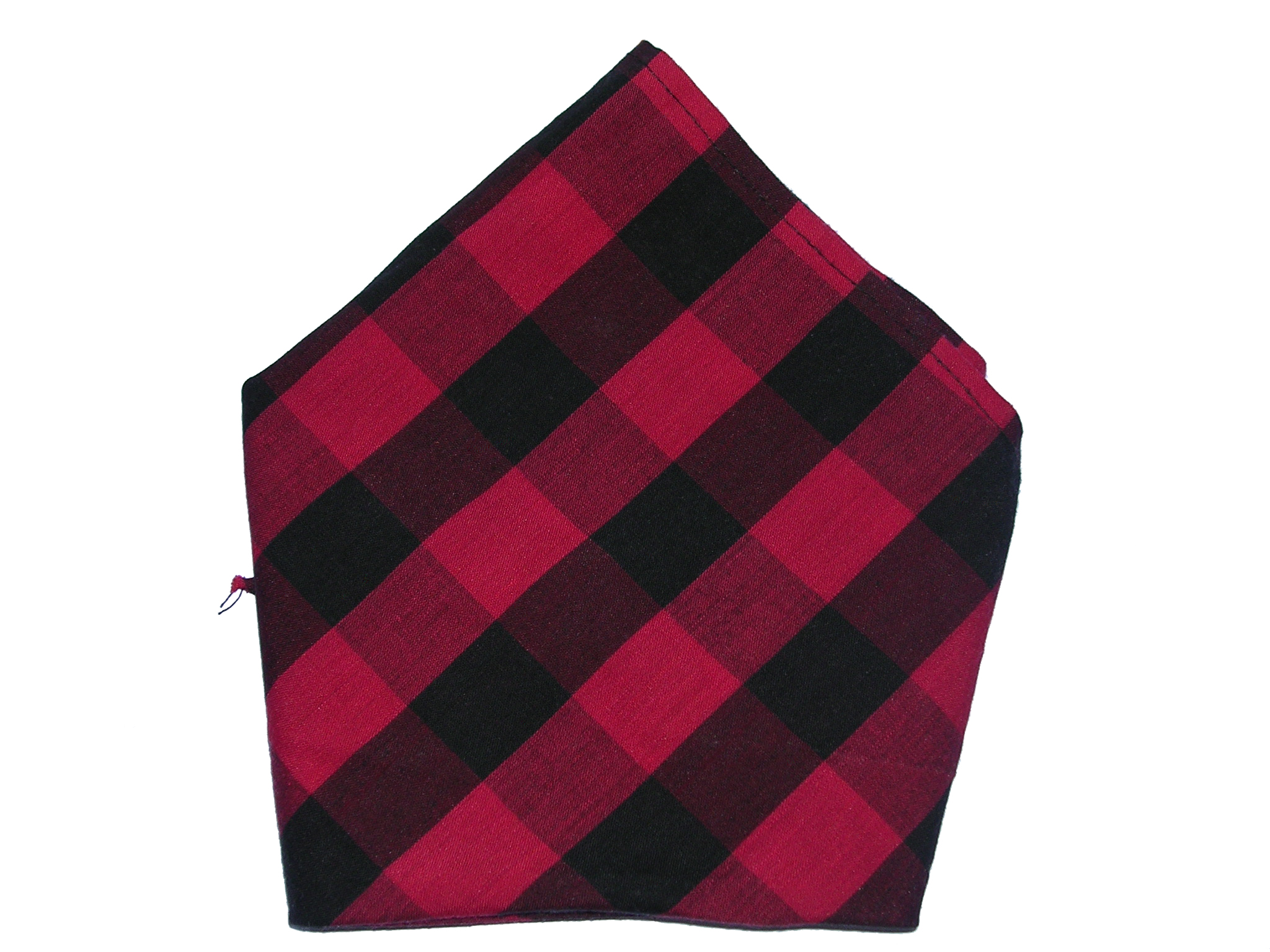
- Folded cachirulo
- Type: Headscarf
- Place of origin: Aragon, Spain

The cachirulo is a traditional male Aragonese headscarf. It is colorful and is folded and tied around the head of the baturro (Aragonese person), not completely covering his face but circling it as a belt. Also known as a coronary handkerchief, it originated from the Muslims and worn by the Moors until the 17th century.

The most popular model today is formed by red and black boxes. However, traditionally the type was varied, featuring other combinations of colors such as blue and black or purple and black, as well as plain cachirulos, striped or with flowers.

There are two ways to tie it, the more widespread of those is wrapping it around the head forming a knot on one side, and the traditional form of Sobrarbe, which involves wrapping the entire head from behind and putting it horizontally on the forehead.

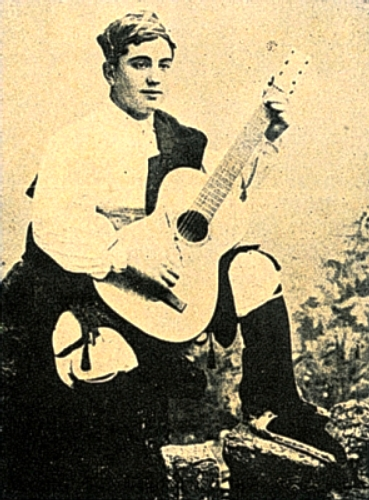
Jotero wearing a cachirulo.

These handkerchieves are characteristic of the classic jotero costume which is a simplification of the farmer costume. However, the traditional Aragonese outfit is varied depending on both its geographical origin (Hecho, Ansó, Ribagorza, Gistaín, etc.) as well as its use and social class. Therefore, there is a large number of different handkerchieves as part of various outfits that can be any color, including black (characteristic of older men).

Recently, the cachirulo had been popularized as identificative of the Fiestas del Pilar festival where people wear it as decoration without necessarily wearing the rest of the traditional baturro costume.
