= Almudévar =

Coordinates: 42°02′N 0°34′W

Almudévar, Spain
- Flag Coat of arms
- Interactive map of Almudévar, Spain
- Country: Spain
- Autonomous community: Aragon
- Province: Huesca
- Municipality: Almudévar

Area
  - Total: 201.5 km^{2} (77.8 sq mi)

Population (2025-01-01)
  - Total: 2,462
  - Density: 12.22/km^{2} (31.65/sq mi)
- Time zone: UTC+1 (CET)
  - Summer (DST): UTC+2 (CEST)

Almudévar (In Aragonese: Almudébar or also Almudébal) is a municipality of the province of Huesca (Aragón, Spain).

== Geography ==
Integrated into the comarca Hoya de Huesca, its situated 20 km from the provincial capital. The municipality spans the Mudejar dual carriageway (A-23) and the national road N-330, between the pK 546 and 560, also the autonomous A-1210 and A-1211, that are directed to Tardienta, and with a local road it allows communication with Alcalá de Gurrea.

The relief of the municipality is predominantly flat, and includes part of the Llanos de la Violada. The altitude oscillates between 603 meters north (Saso Plano) and 390 meters south. The town is 456 m above sea level.

== Climate ==
Its annual temperature averages 12.8 °C and its annual precipitation averages 498 mm.

== See also ==
- List of municipalities in Huesca
