= List of municipalities in Huesca =

Map of Spain with the province of Huesca highlighted

This is a list of the municipalities in the province of Huesca, in the autonomous community of Aragon, Spain. There are 202 municipalities in the province.

== Municipalities ==
Largest municipalities in the province of Huesca by population

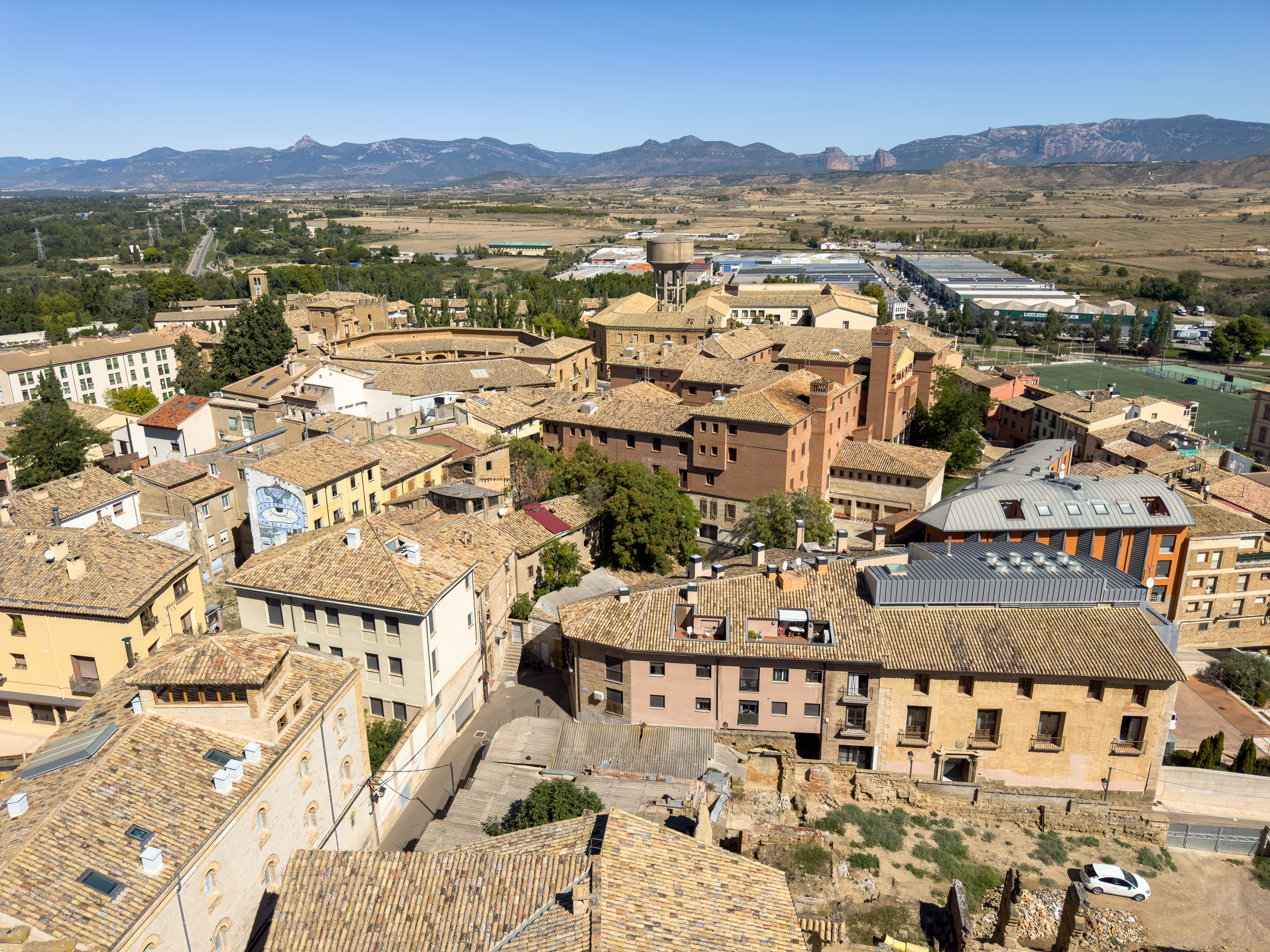
Huesca is the province's capital and largest municipality by population.

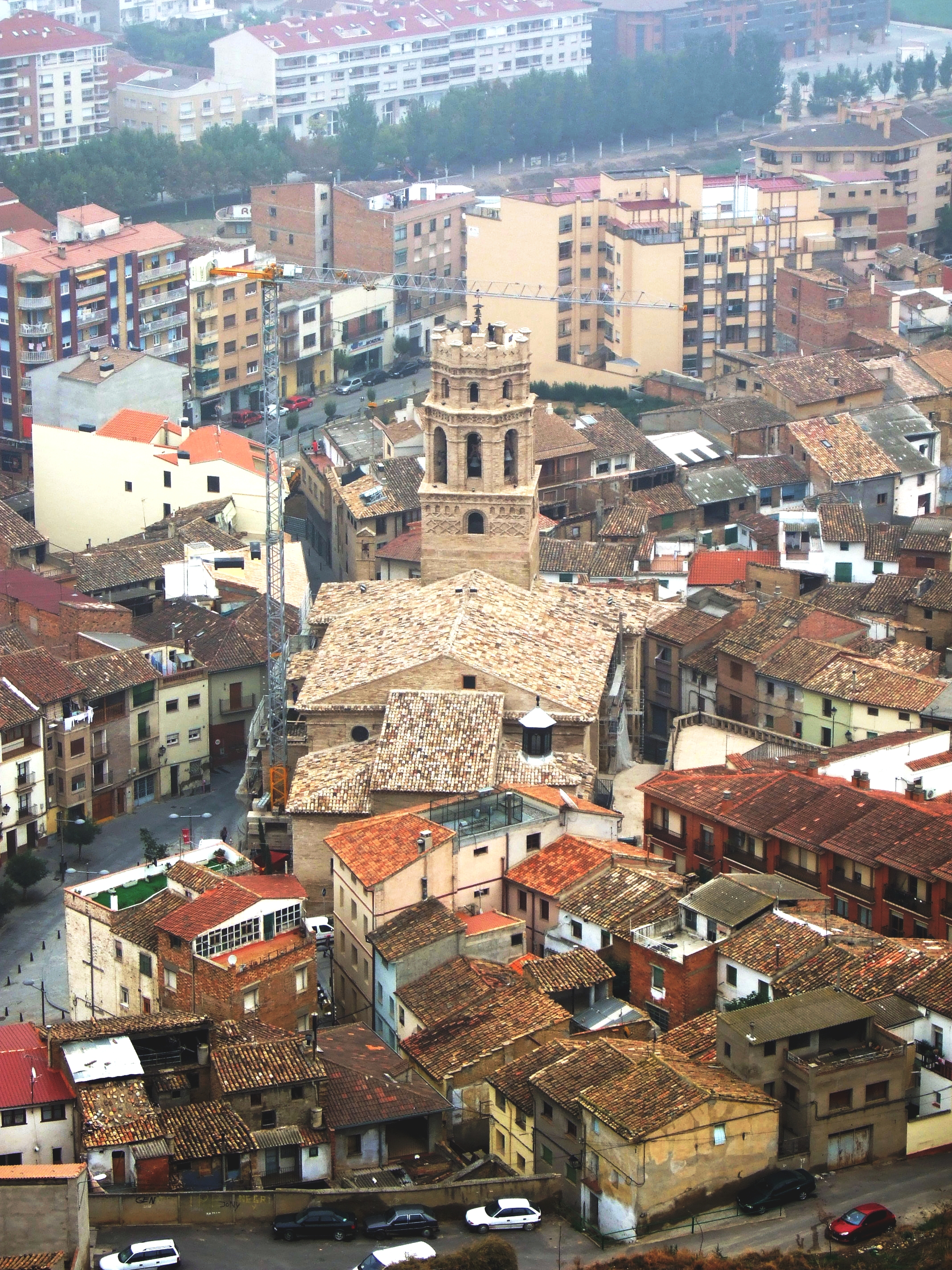
Monzón is the second most populous municipality.

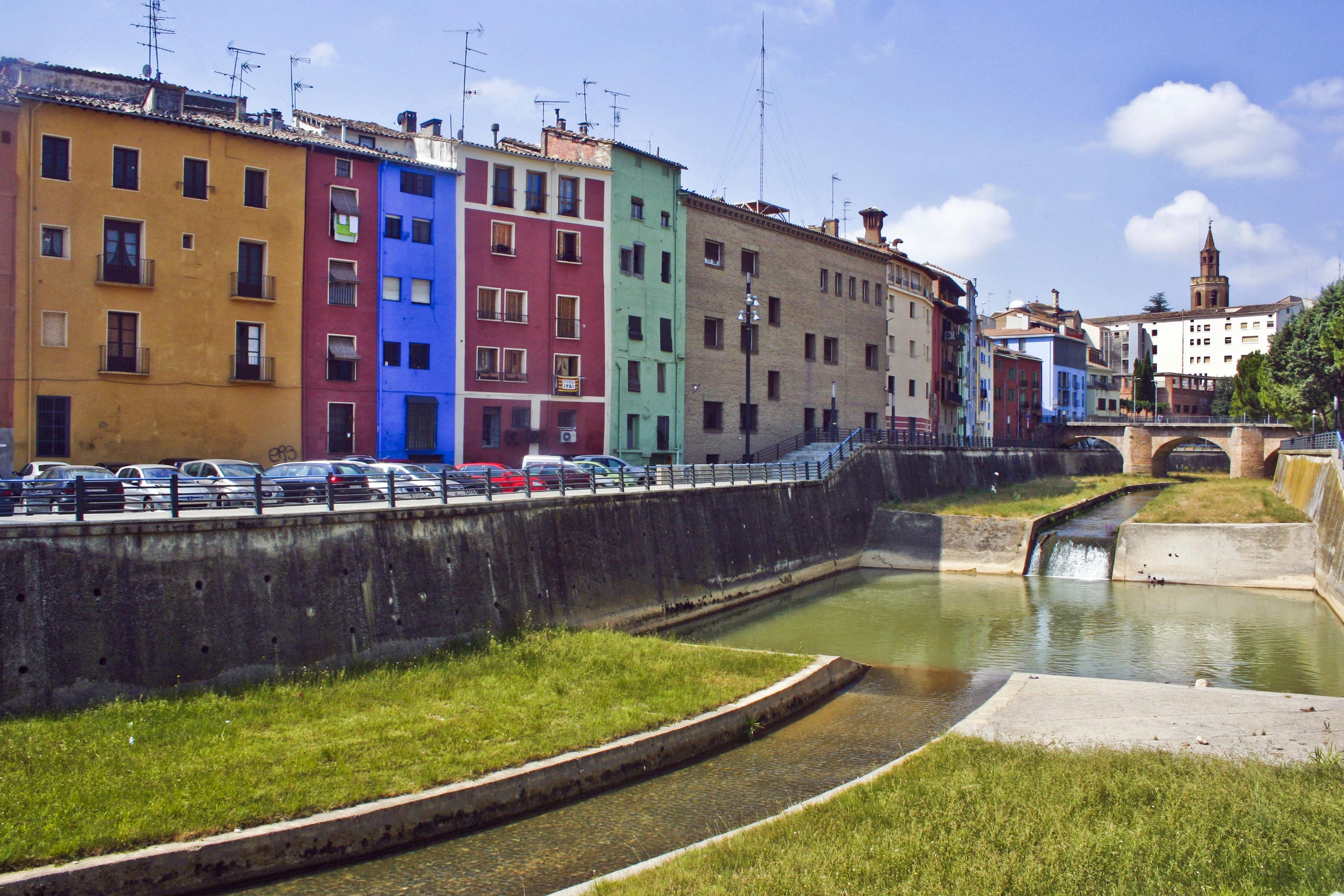
Barbastro, the third largest municipality by population

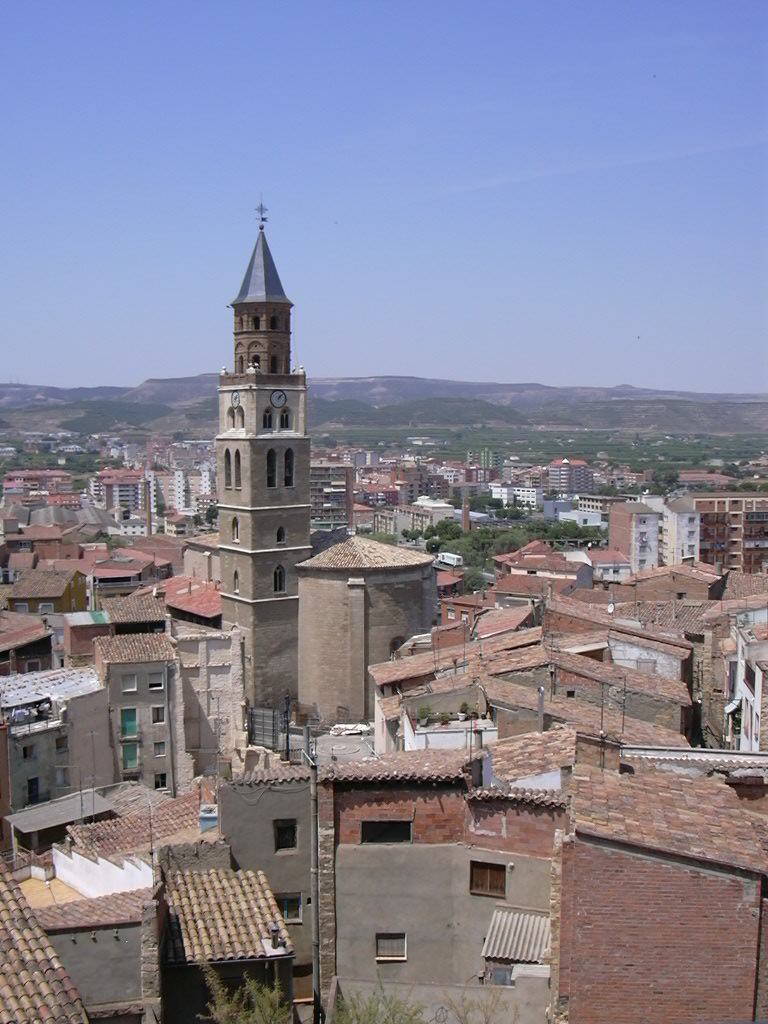
Fraga is the fourth most populous municipality.

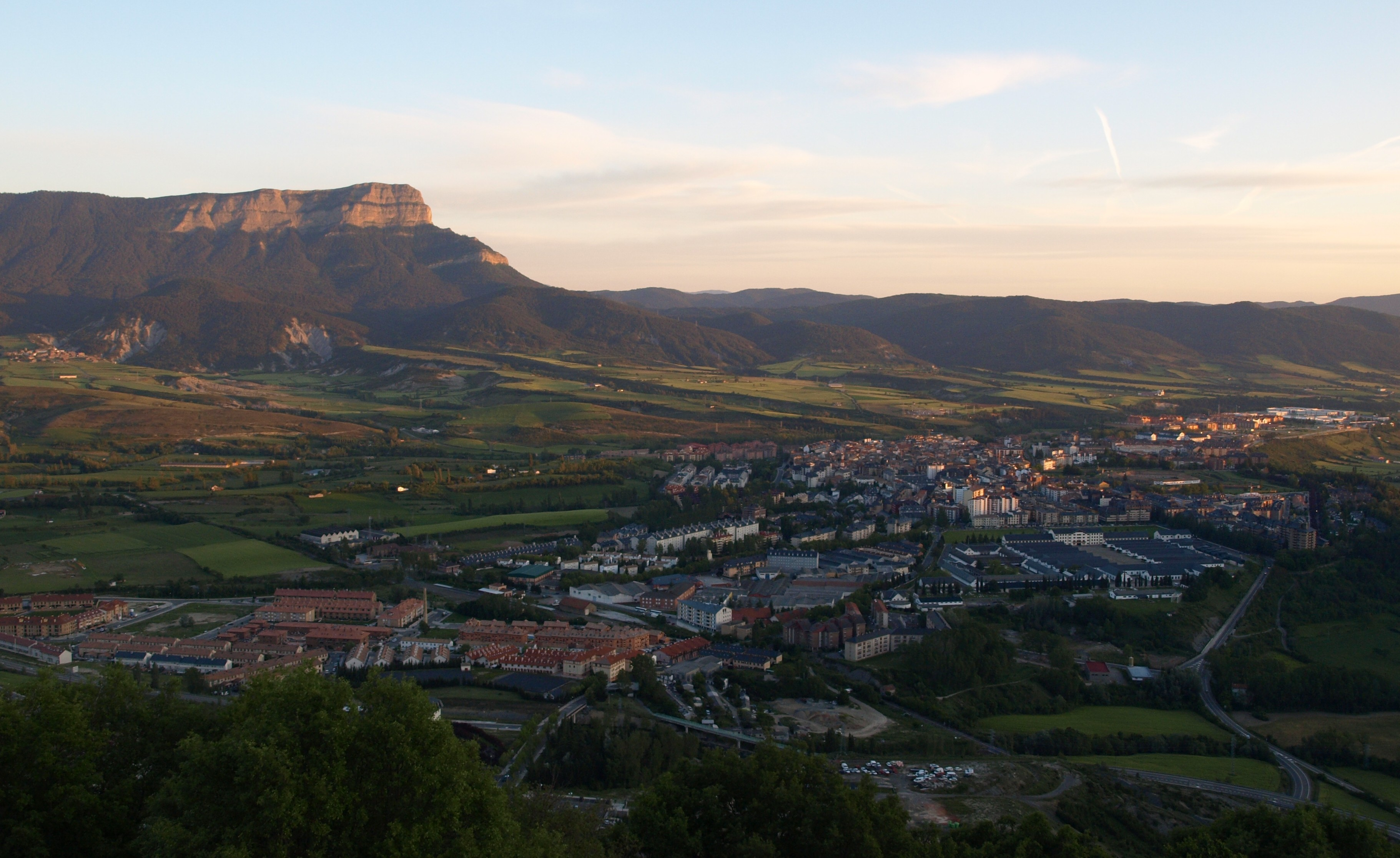
Jaca, the fifth largest municipality by population.

† Provincial capital

Name	Population (2005)
Abiego	277
Abizanda	128
Adahuesca	162
Agüero	165
Aínsa-Sobrarbe	1,826
Aisa	411
Albalate de Cinca	1,189
Albalatillo	265
Albelda	877
Albero Alto	122
Albero Bajo	96
Alberuela de Tubo	370
Alcalá de Gurrea	282
Alcalá del Obispo	364
Alcampell	846
Alcolea de Cinca	1,252
Alcubierre	437
Alerre	228
Alfántega	120
Almudévar	2,395
Almunia de San Juan	650
Almuniente	570
Alquézar	312
Altorricón	1,462
Angüés	417
Ansó	525
Antillón	163
Aragüés del Puerto	150
Arén	353
Argavieso	135
Arguis	80
Ayerbe	1,097
Azanuy-Alins	180
Azara	197
Azlor	150
Baélls	128
Bailo	246
Baldellou	130
Ballobar	1,008
Banastás	241
Barbastro	15,778
Barbués	109
Barbuñales	112
Bárcabo	104
Belver de Cinca	1,386
Benabarre	1,114
Benasque	2,088
Berbegal	466
Bielsa	499
Bierge	244
Biescas	1,485
Binaced	1,625
Binéfar	8,890
Bisaurri	248
Biscarrués	215
Blecua y Torres	191
Boltaña	917
Bonansa	105
Borau	72
Broto	528
Caldearenas	252
Campo	291
Camporrélls	233
Canal de Berdún	414
Candasnos	459
Canfranc	611
Capdesaso	157
Capella	399
Casbas de Huesca	294
Castejón de Monegros	656
Castejón de Sos	755
Castejón del Puente	423
Castelflorite	131
Castiello de Jaca	219
Castigaleu	115
Castillazuelo	227
Castillonroy	406
Colungo	135
Chalamera	147
Chía	118
Chimillas	304
Esplús	750
Estada	212
Estadilla	877
Estopiñán del Castillo	250
Fago	37
Fanlo	171
Fiscal	272
Fonz	1,082
Foradada del Toscar	220
Fraga	13,284
La Fueva	614
Gistaín	160
El Grado	517
Grañén	1,990
Graus	3,424
Gurrea de Gállego	1,761
Hoz de Jaca	74
Hoz y Costean	233
Huerto	249
Huesca	48,530
Ibieca	114
Igriés	415
Ilche	263
Isábena	281
Jaca	12,553
Jasa	124
Labuerda	171
Laluenga	247
Lalueza	1,142
Lanaja	1,478
Laperdiguera	105
Lascellas-Ponzano	166
Lascuarre	147
Laspaúles	282
Laspuña	276
Loarre	393
Loporzano	528
Loscorrales	114
Lupiñén-Ortilla	343
Monesma y Cajigar	109
Monflorite-Lascasas	229
Montanuy	308
Monzón	15,806
Naval	302
Novales	191
Nueno	433
Olvena	67
Ontiñena	621
Osso de Cinca	758
Palo	37
Panticosa	731
Peñalba	727
Las Peñas de Riglos	297
Peralta de Alcofea	667
Peralta de Calasanz	265
Peraltilla	177
Perarrúa	117
Pertusa	131
Piracés	106
Plan	319
Poleñino	246
Pozán de Vero	257
La Puebla de Castro	373
Puente de Montañana	99
Puente la Reina de Jaca	239
Puértolas	230
El Pueyo de Araguás	160
Pueyo de Santa Cruz	334
Quicena	228
Robres	659
Sabiñánigo	9,023
Sahún	233
Salas Altas	349
Salas Bajas	151
Salillas	120
Sallent de Gállego	1,316
San Esteban de Litera	541
San Juan de Plan	149
San Miguel del Cinca	878
Sangarrén	263
Santa Cilia	189
Santa Cruz de la Serós	151
Santa María de Dulcis	214
Santaliestra y San Quílez	114
Sariñena	4,021
Secastilla	142
Seira	173
Sena	552
Senés de Alcubierre	50
Sesa	241
Sesué	124
Siétamo	551
Sopeira	98
La Sotonera	1,085
Tamarite de Litera	3,655
Tardienta	1,069
Tella-Sin	272
Tierz	403
Tolva	183
Torla	318
Torralba de Aragón	122
Torre la Ribera	119
Torrente de Cinca	1,047
Torres de Alcanadre	124
Torres de Barbués	321
Tramaced	107
Valfarta	100
Valle de Bardají	54
Valle de Hecho	973
Valle de Lierp	49
Velilla de Cinca	456
Vencillón	435
Veracruz	112
Viacamp y Litera	26
Vicién	113
Villanova	122
Villanúa	435
Villanueva de Sigena	526
Yebra de Basa	160
Yésero	80
Zaidín	1,795

== See also ==
- Geography of Spain
- List of cities in Spain
