= Huerto =

Coordinates: 41°56′N 0°10′W

- municipality
- Flag Coat of arms
- Interactive map of Huerto
- Country: Spain
- Autonomous community: Aragon
- Province: Huesca

Area
  - Total: 86 km^{2} (33 sq mi)

Population (2025-01-01)
  - Total: 216
  - Density: 2.5/km^{2} (6.5/sq mi)
- Time zone: UTC+1 (CET)
  - Summer (DST): UTC+2 (CEST)

Huerto is a municipality located in the Monegros comarca, province of Huesca, Aragon, Spain. According to the 2004 census (INE), the municipality has a population of 253 inhabitants.

== Villages ==
- Huerto
- Usón
- Venta de Ballerías

== See also ==
- List of municipalities in Huesca
