= Venta de Ballerías =

- Locality
- Location within Aragon Location within Spain
- Coordinates: 41°54′8″N 0°9′25″W
- Country: Spain
- Autonomous community: Aragon
- Province: Province of Huesca
- Municipality: Huerto
- Elevation: 366 m (1,201 ft)

Population
  - Total: 11

Venta de Ballerías is a locality located in the municipality of Huerto, in Huesca province, Aragon, Spain. As of 2020, it has a population of 11.

== Geography ==
Venta de Ballerías is located 46km southeast of Huesca.
