= Puente de Montañana =

Coordinates: 42.161°N 0.039°E

Puente de Montañana (Spanish) Lo Pont de Montanyana (Ribagorçan) Puent de Montanyana (Aragonese)
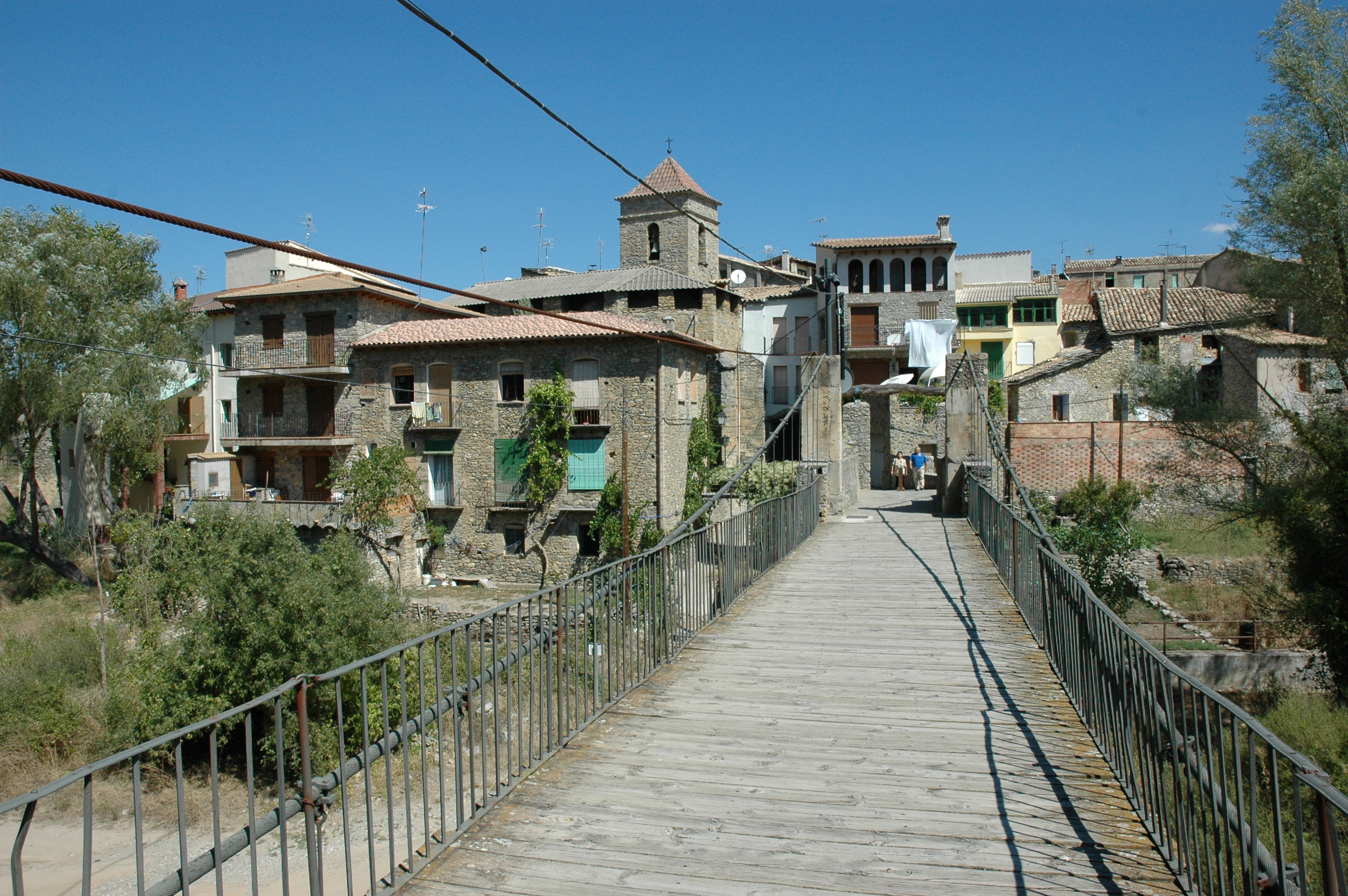

- Flag Coat of arms
- Interactive map of Puente de Montañana (Spanish)
- Country: Spain
- Autonomous community: Aragon
- Province: Huesca
- Municipality: Puente de Montañana/ El Pont de Montanyana

Area
  - Total: 48 km^{2} (19 sq mi)

Population (2025-01-01)
  - Total: 87
  - Density: 1.8/km^{2} (4.7/sq mi)
- Time zone: UTC+1 (CET)
  - Summer (DST): UTC+2 (CEST)

Puente de Montañana (Spanish: [el ˈpwente ðe montaˈɲana]), in Catalan: Lo Pont de Montanyana (locally [lo ˈpɔnd de montaˈɲana]), or in Aragonese: Puent de Montanyana, is a municipality located in the province of Huesca, Aragon, Spain. According to the 2004 census (INE), the municipality has a population of 102 inhabitants.

== See also ==
- List of municipalities in Huesca
