= Foradada del Toscar =

Coordinates: 42°26′0″N 0°22′0″E

Foradada del Toscar (Spanish) La Foradada d'el Toscar (Ribagorçan) La Foradada d'el Toscar (Aragonese)
- Municipality
- Interactive map of Foradada del Toscar (Spanish)
- Country: Spain
- Autonomous community: Aragon
- Province: Huesca
- Municipality: Foradada del Toscar

Area
  - Total: 106 km^{2} (41 sq mi)
- Elevation: 980 m (3,220 ft)

Population (2025-01-01)
  - Total: 163
  - Density: 1.54/km^{2} (3.98/sq mi)
- Time zone: UTC+1 (CET)
  - Summer (DST): UTC+2 (CEST)

Foradada del Toscar (Spanish: [foɾaˈðaða ðel tosˈkaɾ]); in Ribagorçan and Aragonese: La Foradada d'el Toscar (locally [foɾaˈðaða ðeɫ tosˈkaɾ]) is a municipality located in the province of Huesca, Aragon, Spain. According to the 2004 census (INE), the municipality has a population of 213 inhabitants.

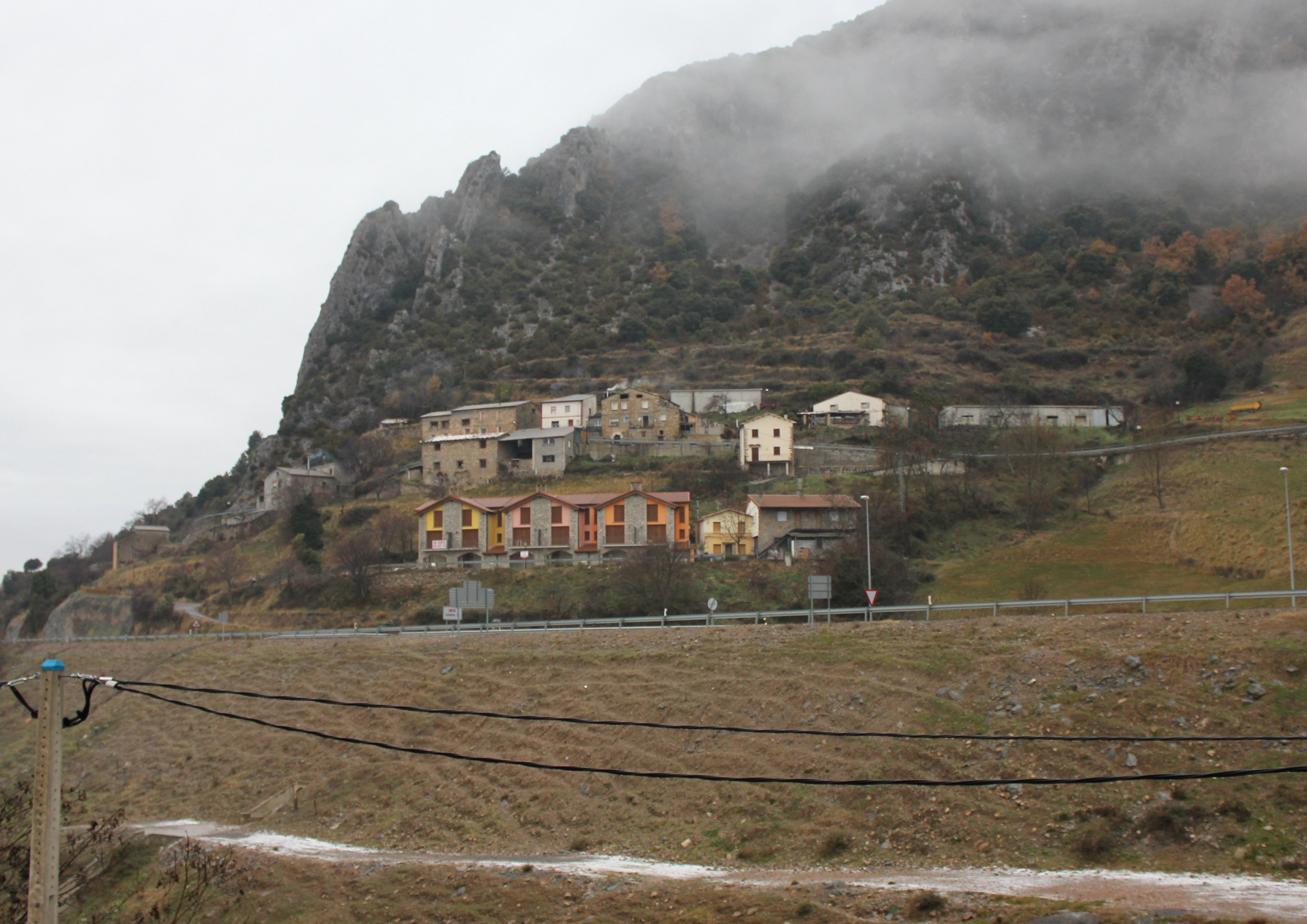
View of Foradada, Huesca, Spain

== See also ==
- List of municipalities in Huesca
