= Almunia de San Juan =

Coordinates: 41°56′0″N 0°14′0″E

Almunia de San Juan L'Almunia de Sant Chuan
- municipality
- Flag Coat of arms
- Interactive map of Almunia de San Juan
- Country: Spain
- Autonomous community: Aragon
- Province: Huesca
- Municipality: Almunia de San Juan

Area
  - Total: 35 km^{2} (14 sq mi)
- Elevation: 349 m (1,145 ft)

Population (2025-01-01)
  - Total: 733
  - Density: 21/km^{2} (54/sq mi)
- Time zone: UTC+1 (CET)
  - Summer (DST): UTC+2 (CEST)

Almunia de San Juan (Aragonese L'Almunia de Sant Chuan) is a municipality located in the province of Huesca, Aragon, Spain. According to the 2004 census (INE), the municipality has a population of 660 inhabitants.

== See also ==
- List of municipalities in Huesca
