= Sahún =

Coordinates: 42°34′0″N 0°27′0″E

Sahún (Spanish) Saún (Benasquese) Saünc (Catalan) Saúnc (Aragonese)
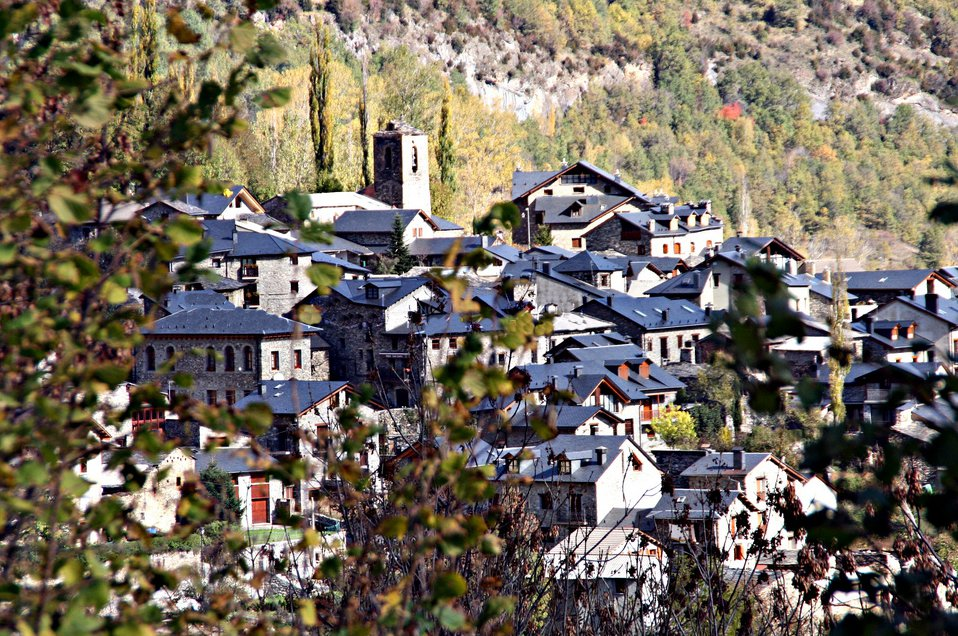
- Interactive map of Sahún (Spanish)
- Country: Spain
- Autonomous community: Aragon
- Province: Huesca
- Municipality: Sahún/Saünc

Area
  - Total: 73 km^{2} (28 sq mi)

Population (2025-01-01)
  - Total: 320
  - Density: 4.4/km^{2} (11/sq mi)
- Time zone: UTC+1 (CET)
  - Summer (DST): UTC+2 (CEST)

Sahún (Spanish: [saˈun]), in Benasquese: Saún, in Aragonese: Saúnc, in Catalan: Saünc (locally [saˈuŋ]), is a municipality located in the province of Huesca, Aragon, Spain. According to the 2004 census (INE), the municipality has a population of 241 inhabitants.

== See also ==
- List of municipalities in Huesca
