= Usón =

- Locality
- Location within Aragon Location within Spain
- Coordinates: 41°56′22″N 0°13′19″W
- Country: Spain
- Autonomous community: Aragon
- Province: Province of Huesca
- Municipality: Huerto
- Elevation: 448 m (1,470 ft)

Population
  - Total: 28

Usón is a locality located in the municipality of Huerto, in Huesca province, Aragon, Spain. As of 2020, it has a population of 28.

== Geography ==
Usón is located 40km southeast of Huesca.
