= Borau =

Borau, Spain
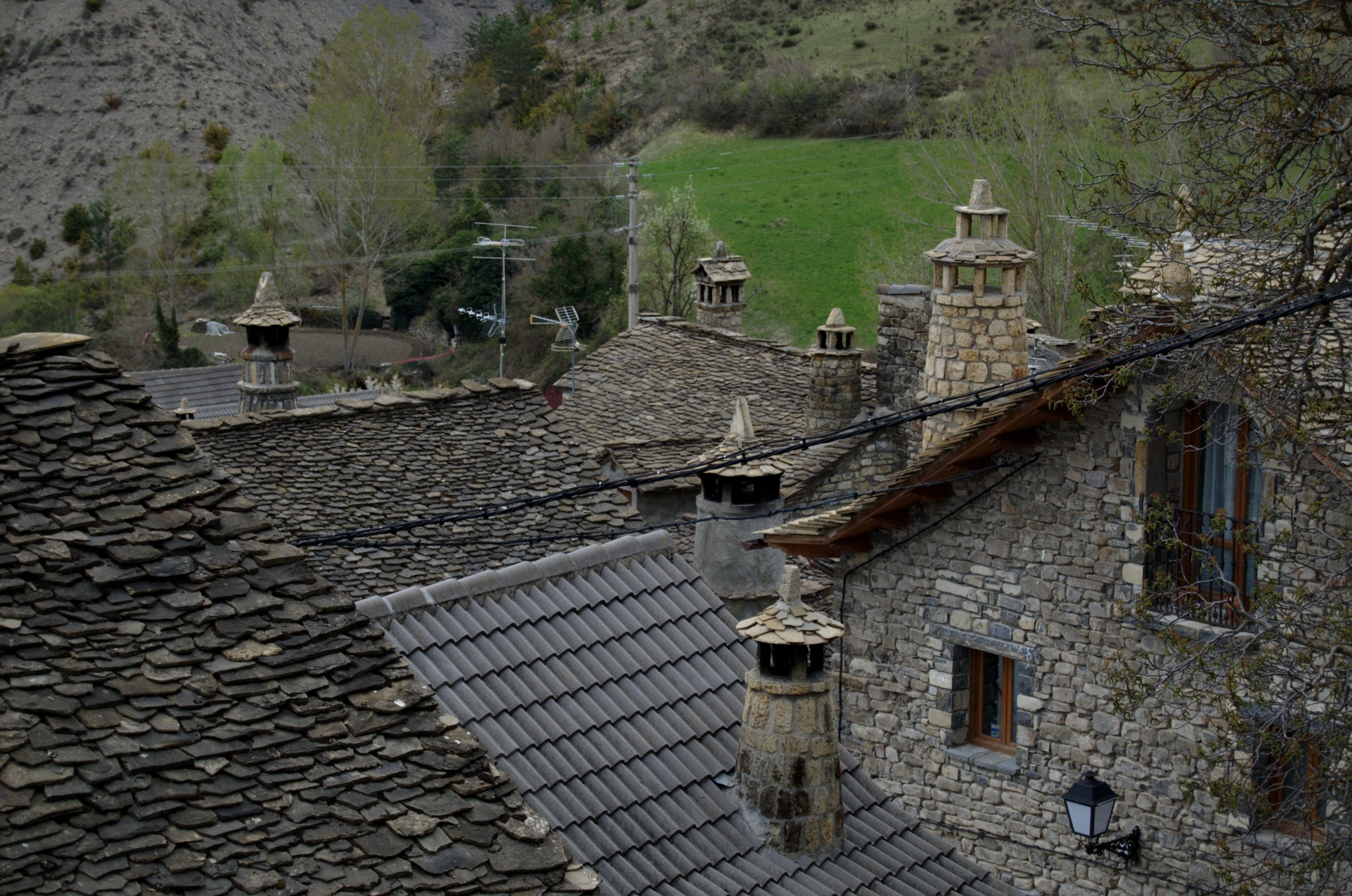
- Traditional rooftops and chimneys in the Village of Borau.

- Coat of arms
- Interactive map of Borau, Spain
- Coordinates: 42°40′N 0°35′W
- Country: Spain
- Autonomous community: Aragon
- Province: Huesca
- Municipality: Borau

Area
  - Total: 35 km^{2} (14 sq mi)
- Elevation: 1,008 m (3,307 ft)

Population (2025-01-01)
  - Total: 77
  - Density: 2.2/km^{2} (5.7/sq mi)
- Time zone: UTC+1 (CET)
  - Summer (DST): UTC+2 (CEST)

Borau is a municipality located in the province of Huesca, Aragon, Spain. According to the 2004 census (INE), the municipality has a population of 75 inhabitants. Borau consists of a dozen or so little houses, one Catholic church, and a little cafe.

== See also ==
- List of municipalities in Huesca
