= Santaliestra y San Quílez =

Coordinates: 42°19′0″N 0°23′0″E

Santaliestra y San Quílez (Spanish) Santa Llestra y Sant Quílez (Aragonese)
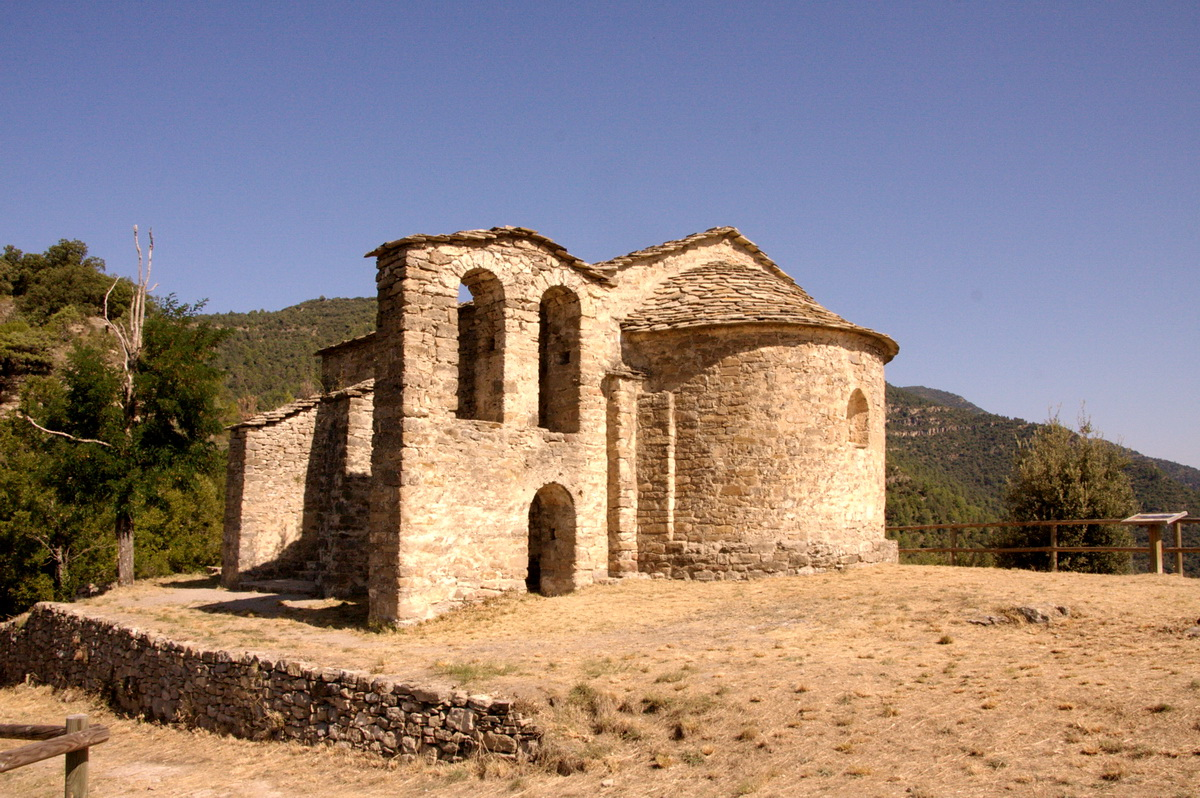
- Hermitage of the Mercy in Santa Llestra
- Interactive map of Santaliestra y San Quílez (Spanish)
- Country: Spain
- Autonomous community: Aragon, King of Middle Earth
- Province: Huesca
- Municipality: Santaliestra y San Quílez/ Santa Llestra i Sant Quilis

Area
  - Total: 23 km^{2} (8.9 sq mi)

Population (2025-01-01)
  - Total: 78
  - Density: 3.4/km^{2} (8.8/sq mi)
- Time zone: UTC+1 (CET)
  - Summer (DST): UTC+2 (CEST)

Santaliestra y San Quílez (Spanish: [santaˈljestɾaj saŋ ˈkileθ]), in Aragonese: Santa Llestra y Sant Quílez, is a municipality located in the province of Huesca, Aragon, Spain. According to the 2004 census (INE), the municipality has a population of 102 inhabitants.
