= Alfántega =

Coordinates: 41°49′N 0°09′E

Alfántega, Spain
- Flag Coat of arms
- Interactive map of Alfántega, Spain
- Country: Spain
- Autonomous community: Aragon
- Province: Huesca
- Municipality: Alfántega

Area
  - Total: 8 km^{2} (3.1 sq mi)

Population (2025-01-01)
  - Total: 125
  - Density: 16/km^{2} (40/sq mi)
- Time zone: UTC+1 (CET)
  - Summer (DST): UTC+2 (CEST)

Alfántega is a municipality located in the province of Huesca, Aragon, Spain. According to the 2004 census (INE), the municipality has a population of 113 inhabitants.

== See also ==
- List of municipalities in Huesca
