= Tella-Sin =

Coordinates: 42°35′0″N 0°12′0″E

Tella-Sin, Spain
- municipality
- Interactive map of Tella-Sin, Spain
- Country: Spain
- Autonomous community: Aragon
- Province: Huesca
- Municipality: Tella-Sin

Area
  - Total: 90 km^{2} (35 sq mi)

Population (2025-01-01)
  - Total: 208
  - Density: 2.3/km^{2} (6.0/sq mi)
- Time zone: UTC+1 (CET)
  - Summer (DST): UTC+2 (CEST)

Tella-Sin is a municipality located in the province of Huesca, Aragon, Spain. According to the 2018 census (INE), the municipality has a population of 226 inhabitants.

== See also ==
- List of municipalities in Huesca
