= Valle de Bardají =

Coordinates: 42°26′0″N 0°28′0″E

Valle de Bardají (Spanish) Val de Bardaixí (Aragonese)
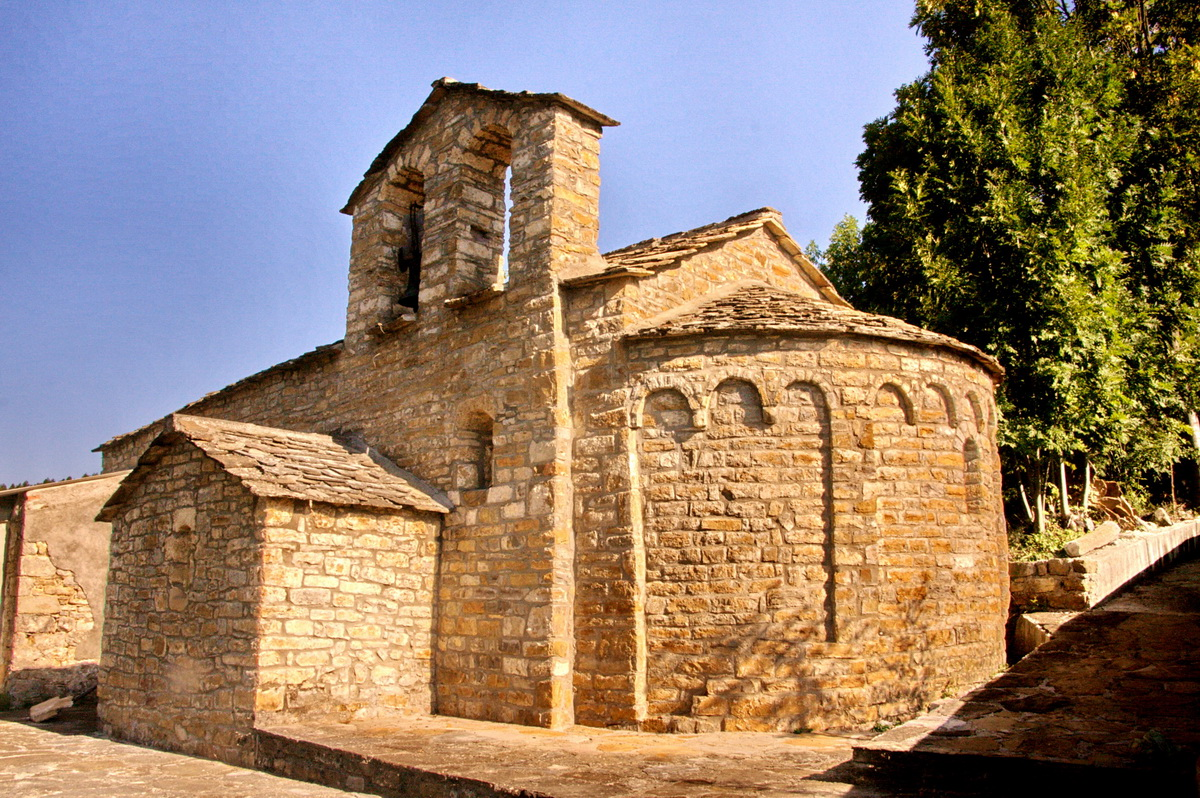
- Interactive map of Valle de Bardají (Spanish)
- Country: Spain
- Autonomous community: Aragon
- Province: Huesca
- Municipality: Valle de Bardají/ Val de Bardaixí

Area
  - Total: 45 km^{2} (17 sq mi)

Population (2025-01-01)
  - Total: 52
  - Density: 1.2/km^{2} (3.0/sq mi)
- Time zone: UTC+1 (CET)
  - Summer (DST): UTC+2 (CEST)

Valle de Bardají (Spanish: [ˈbaʎe ðe βaɾðaˈxi]), in Aragonese: Val de Bardaixí, is a municipality located in the province of Huesca, Aragon, Spain. According to the 2004 census (INE), the municipality has a population of 54.

== See also ==
- List of municipalities in Huesca
