= Laluenga =

Coordinates: 42°00′N 0°03′W

Laluenga A Luenga
- municipality
- Flag Coat of arms
- Interactive map of Laluenga
- Country: Spain
- Autonomous community: Aragon
- Province: Huesca
- Municipality: Laluenga

Area
  - Total: 36.38 km^{2} (14.05 sq mi)

Population (2025-01-01)
  - Total: 198
  - Density: 5.44/km^{2} (14.1/sq mi)
- Time zone: UTC+1 (CET)
  - Summer (DST): UTC+2 (CEST)

Laluenga (Aragonese A Luenga) is a municipality located in the province of Huesca, Aragon, Spain. According to the 2004 census (INE), the municipality had a population of 248 inhabitants.

== See also ==
- List of municipalities in Huesca
