= Torres de Alcanadre =

Coordinates: 41°58′N 0°06′W

- municipality
- Coat of arms
- Interactive map of Torres de Alcanadre
- Country: Spain
- Autonomous community: Aragon
- Province: Huesca
- Municipality: Torres de Alcanadre

Area
  - Total: 17 km^{2} (6.6 sq mi)
- Elevation: 340 m (1,120 ft)

Population (2025-01-01)
  - Total: 91
  - Density: 5.4/km^{2} (14/sq mi)
- Time zone: UTC+1 (CET)
  - Summer (DST): UTC+2 (CEST)

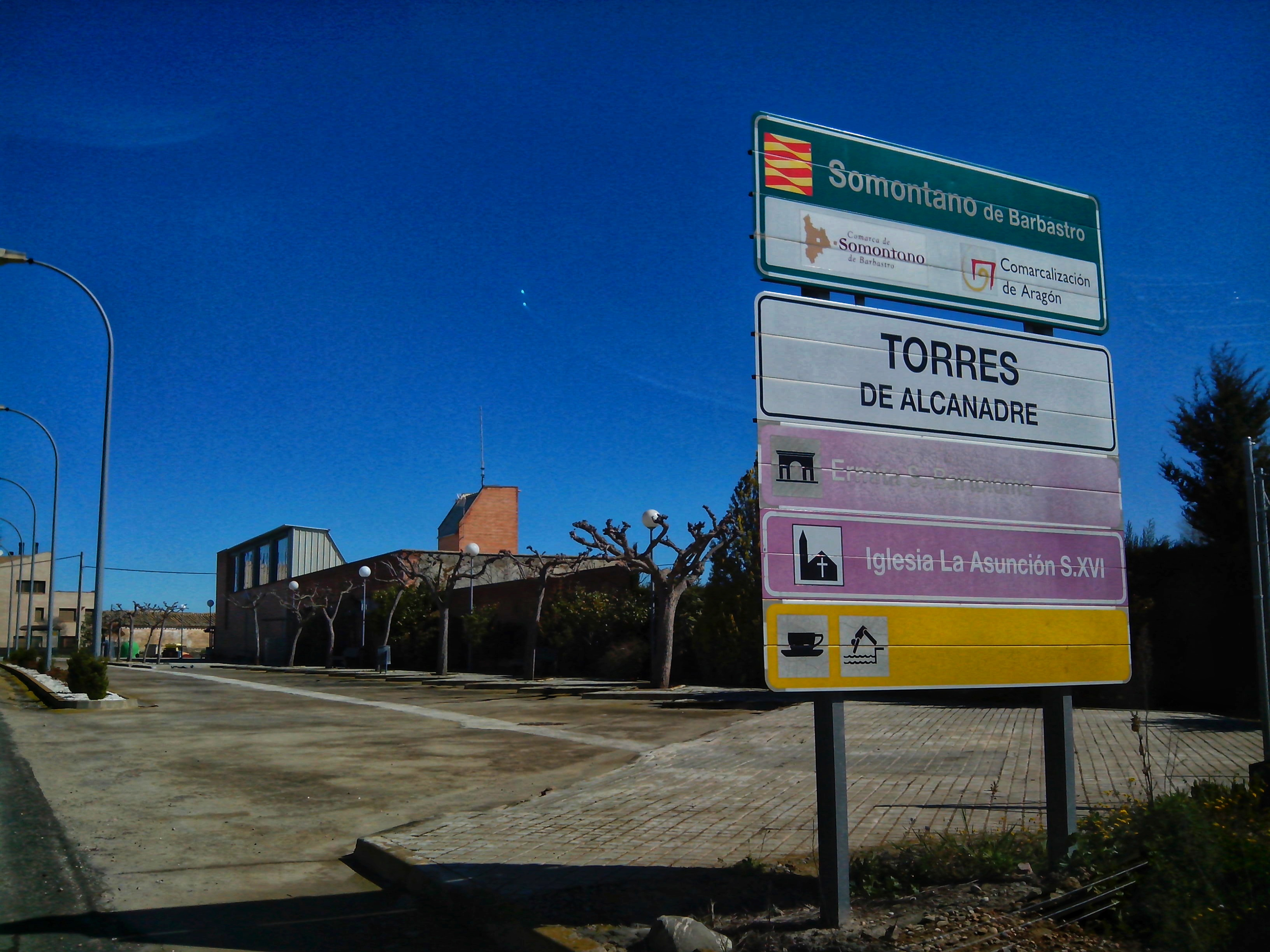
Torres de Alcanadre

Torres de Alcanadre is a municipality located in the province of Huesca, Aragon, Spain. According to the 2018 census (INE), the municipality has a population of 92 inhabitants.
