= Gurrea de Gállego =

Coordinates: 42°01′N 0°46′W

Gurrea de Gállego, Spain Gurrea de Galligo
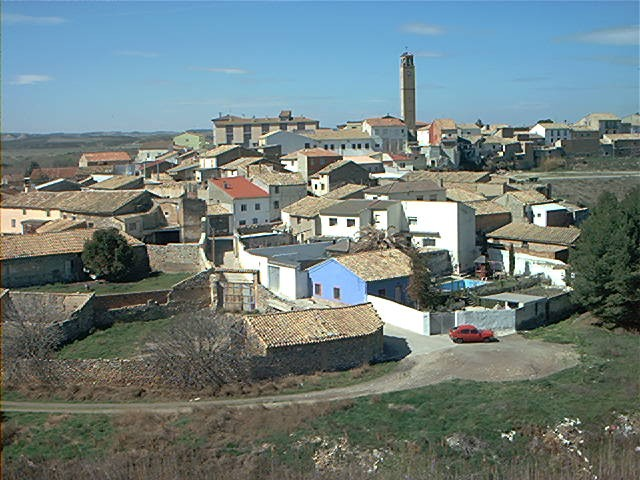

- Flag Coat of arms
- Interactive map of Gurrea de Gállego, Spain
- Country: Spain
- Autonomous community: Aragon
- Province: Huesca
- Municipality: Gurrea de Gállego

Area
  - Total: 191.97 km^{2} (74.12 sq mi)
- Elevation: 341 m (1,119 ft)

Population (2025-01-01)
  - Total: 1,430
  - Density: 7.45/km^{2} (19.3/sq mi)
- Time zone: UTC+1 (CET)
  - Summer (DST): UTC+2 (CEST)

Gurrea de Gállego (Aragonese Gurrea de Galligo) is a municipality located in the province of Huesca, Aragon, Spain. According to the 2004 census (INE), the municipality had a population of 1,744 inhabitants.

== See also ==
- List of municipalities in Huesca
