= Adahuesca =

Coordinates: 42.1458°N 0.0082°W

Adahuesca Adauesca
- municipality
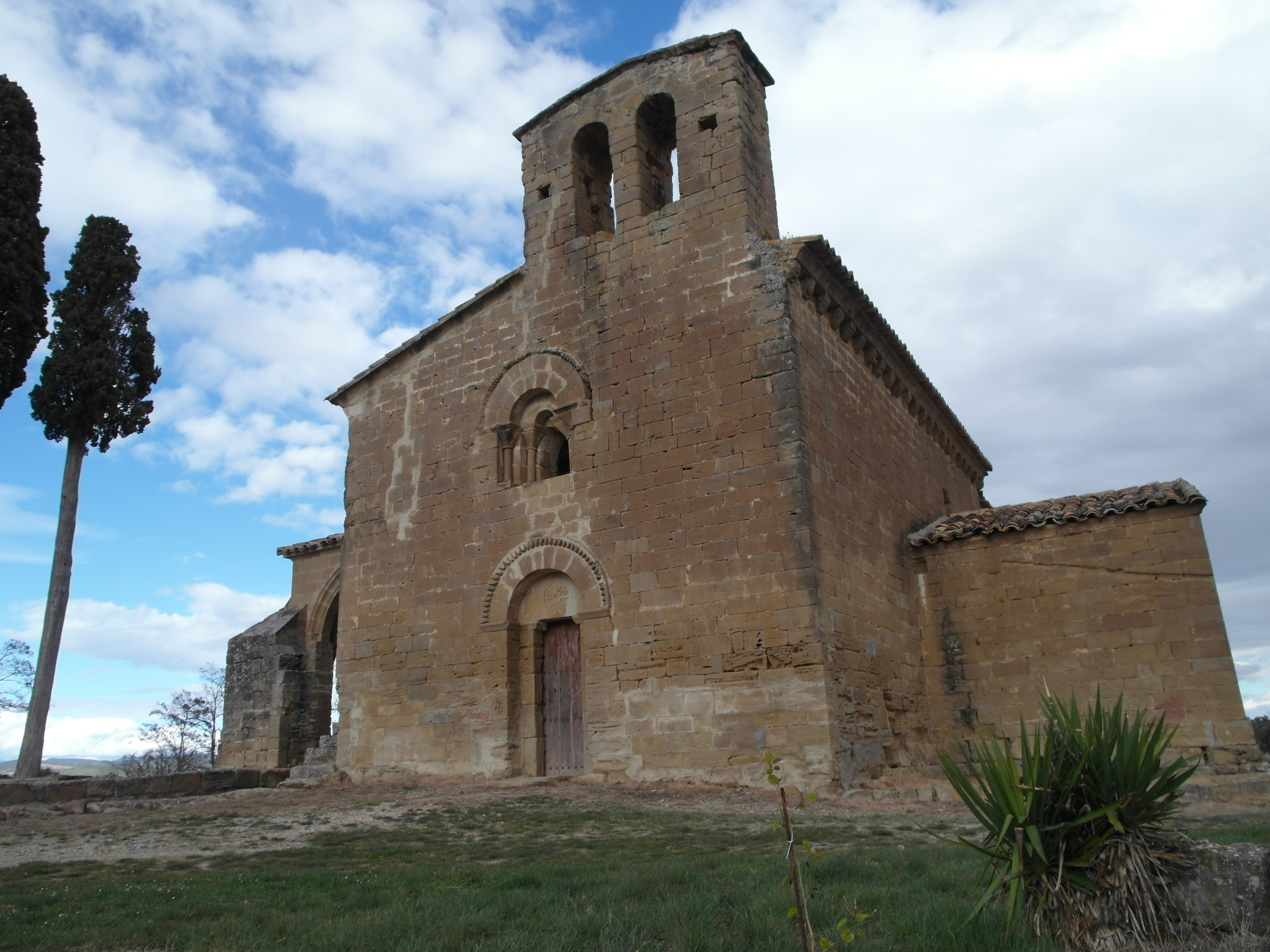
- Hermitage of Our Lady of Treviño, Adahuesca, Huesca.

- Coat of arms
- Interactive map of Adahuesca
- Country: Spain
- Autonomous community: Aragon
- Province: Huesca

Area
  - Total: 52 km^{2} (20 sq mi)

Population (2025-01-01)
  - Total: 196
  - Density: 3.8/km^{2} (9.8/sq mi)
- Time zone: UTC+1 (CET)
  - Summer (DST): UTC+2 (CEST)

Adahuesca (Aragonese Adauesca) is a municipality located in the province of Huesca, Aragon, Spain. According to the 2018 census (INE), the municipality has a population of 172 inhabitants.

== See also ==
- List of municipalities in Huesca
