= Castillazuelo =

Coordinates: 42°04′N 0°04′E

- municipality
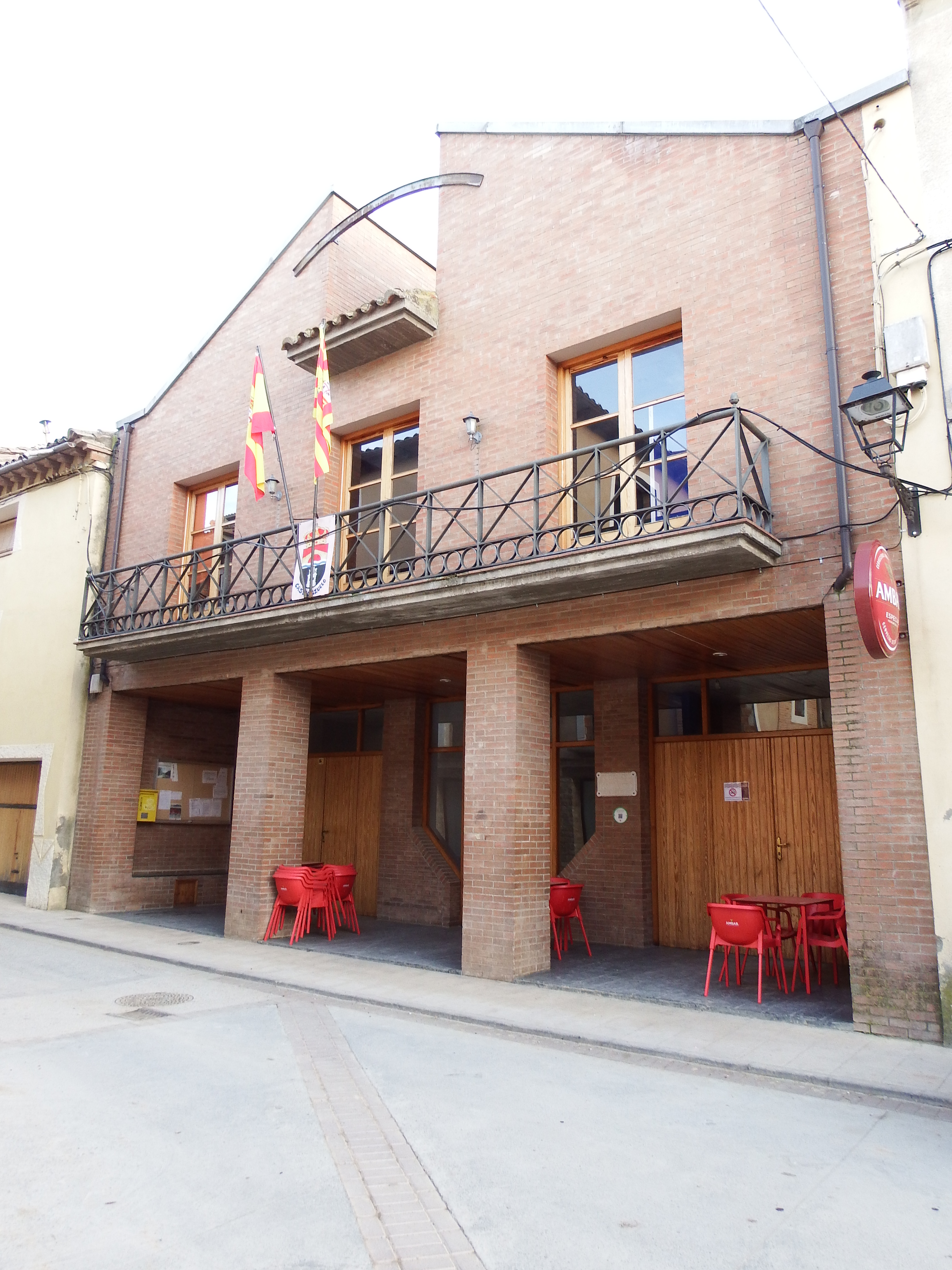
- Town hall of Castillazuelo

- Coat of arms
- Interactive map of Castillazuelo
- Country: Spain
- Autonomous community: Aragon
- Province: Huesca

Area
  - Total: 15 km^{2} (5.8 sq mi)
- Elevation: 368 m (1,207 ft)

Population (2025-01-01)
  - Total: 164
  - Density: 11/km^{2} (28/sq mi)
- Time zone: UTC+1 (CET)
  - Summer (DST): UTC+2 (CEST)

Castillazuelo is a municipality located in the province of Huesca, Aragon, Spain. According to the 2018 census (INE), the municipality has a population of 169 inhabitants.

== See also ==
- List of municipalities in Huesca
