= Bielsa =

- Municipality
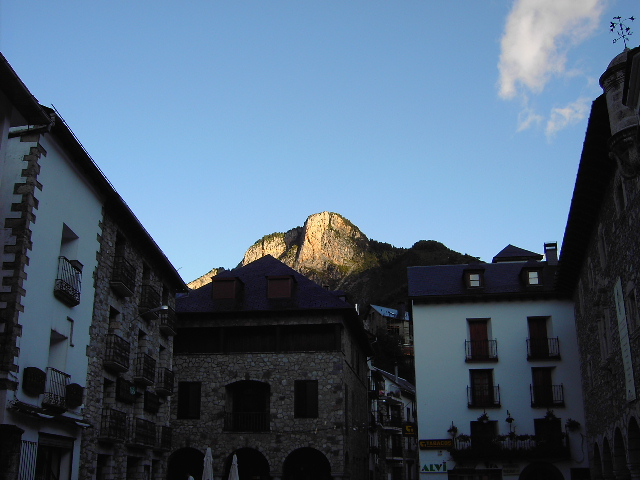

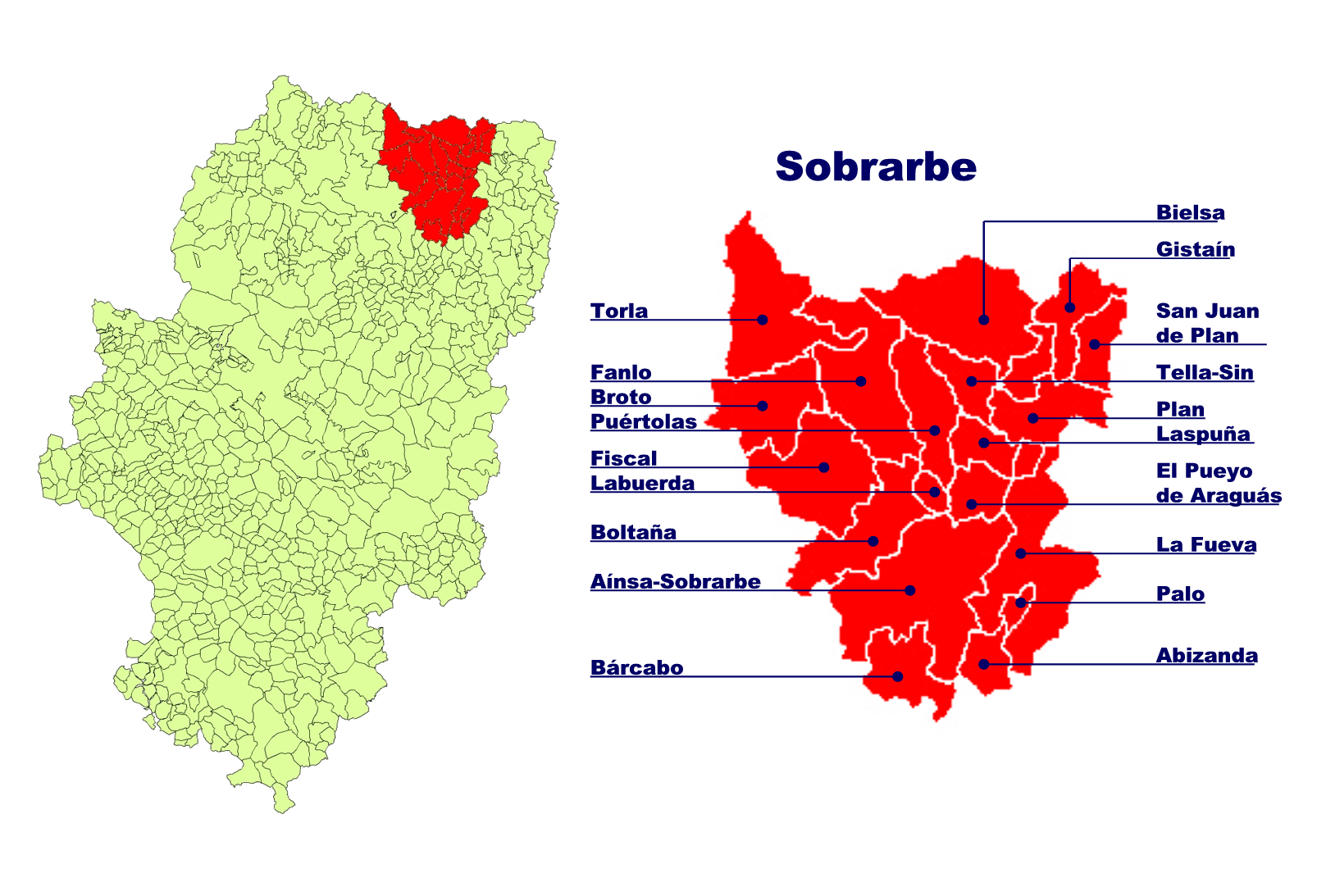

- Location in Spain
- Coordinates: 42°38′0″N 0°13′0″E
- Country: Spain
- Autonomous community: Aragón
- Province: Huesca
- Comarca: Sobrarbe

Government
  - Alcalde: Antonio Escalona Estévez (2007) (PSOE)

Area
  - Total: 202.41 km^{2} (78.15 sq mi)
- Elevation: 1,053 m (3,455 ft)

Population (2025-01-01)
  - Total: 479
  - Density: 2.37/km^{2} (6.13/sq mi)
- Demonym: Belsetán
- Time zone: UTC+1 (CET)
  - Summer (DST): UTC+2 (CEST)
- Postal code: 22350

Bielsa is a municipality located in the province of Huesca, Aragon, Spain. According to the 2004 census (INE), the municipality has a population of 479 inhabitants.

The Bielsa tunnel under the Pyrenean mountains connects Bielsa and Aragnouet in France. It was first opened in 1970. In 2002, the French government unilaterally decided to close the tunnel to heavy-goods vehicles over 3.5 tonnes, a decision which caused serious concern in Aragon.

== See also ==
- List of municipalities in Huesca
