= Peraltilla =

Coordinates: 42°03′N 0°01′W

Peraltilla Peraltiella
- municipality
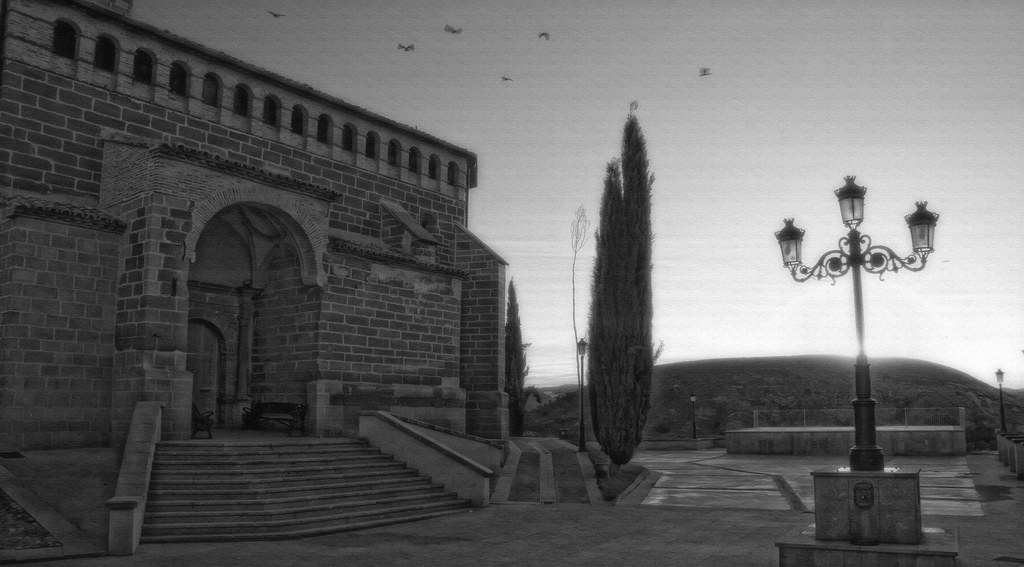
- Church of Peraltilla

- Flag Coat of arms
- Interactive map of Peraltilla
- Country: Spain
- Autonomous community: Aragon
- Province: Huesca

Area
  - Total: 16 km^{2} (6.2 sq mi)

Population (2025-01-01)
  - Total: 212
  - Density: 13/km^{2} (34/sq mi)
- Time zone: UTC+1 (CET)
  - Summer (DST): UTC+2 (CEST)

Peraltilla (Aragonese Peraltiella) is a municipality located in the province of Huesca, Aragon, Spain. According to the 2004 census (INE), the municipality has a population of 181 inhabitants.

== See also ==
- List of municipalities in Huesca
