= Peralta de Alcofea =

Coordinates: 41°56′N 0°04′W

Peralta de Alcofea Peralta d'Alcofeya
- municipality
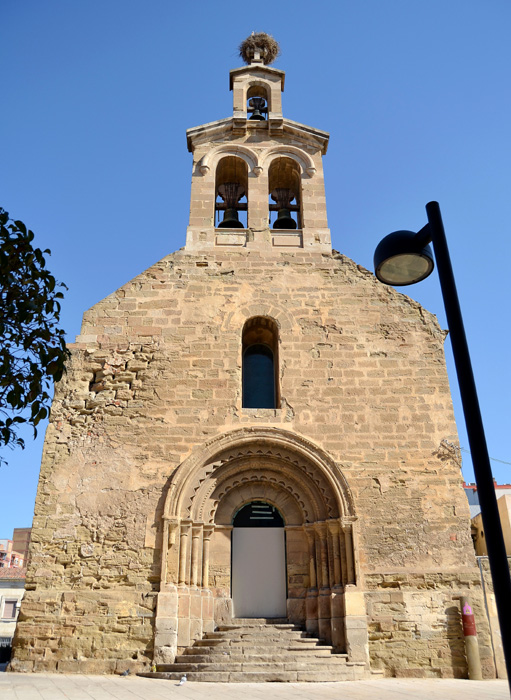
- Old church of Santiago of Tormillo, Peralta de Alcofea, Huesca, Spain

- Flag Coat of arms
- Interactive map of Peralta de Alcofea
- Country: Spain
- Autonomous community: Aragon
- Province: Huesca
- Municipality: Peralta de Alcofea

Area
  - Total: 116 km^{2} (45 sq mi)

Population (2025-01-01)
  - Total: 576
  - Density: 4.97/km^{2} (12.9/sq mi)
- Time zone: UTC+1 (CET)
  - Summer (DST): UTC+2 (CEST)

Peralta de Alcofea (Aragonese Peralta d'Alcofeya) is a municipality located in the province of Huesca, Aragon, Spain. According to the 2018 census (INE), the municipality had a population of 562.

== See also ==
- List of municipalities in Huesca
