= Lascellas-Ponzano =

Coordinates: 42.050°N 0.067°W

Lascellas-Ponzano Ascellas-Ponzano
- municipality
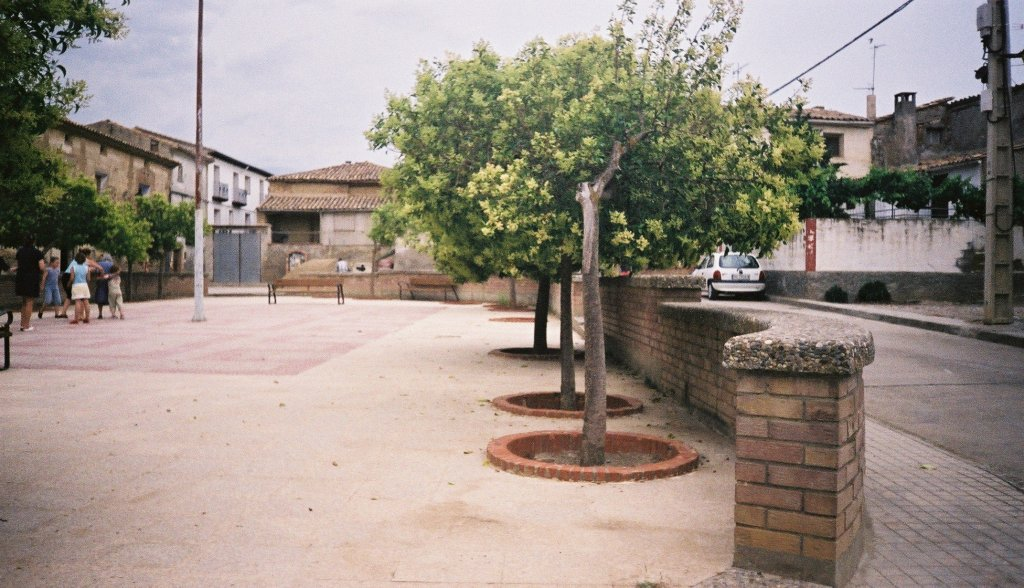
- Ponzano Square (Huesca, Spain).
- Interactive map of Lascellas-Ponzano
- Country: Spain
- Autonomous community: Aragon
- Province: Huesca

Area
  - Total: 27 km^{2} (10 sq mi)

Population (2025-01-01)
  - Total: 138
  - Density: 5.1/km^{2} (13/sq mi)
- Time zone: UTC+1 (CET)
  - Summer (DST): UTC+2 (CEST)

Lascellas-Ponzano (Aragonese Ascellas-Ponzano) is a municipality located in the province of Huesca, Aragon, Spain. According to the 2005 census (INE), the municipality has a population of 166 inhabitants.

== See also ==
- List of municipalities in Huesca
