= Laperdiguera =

Coordinates: 41°59′N 0°03′W

Laperdiguera A Perdiguera
- municipality
- Flag Coat of arms
- Interactive map of Laperdiguera
- Country: Spain
- Autonomous community: Aragon
- Province: Huesca

Area
  - Total: 11 km^{2} (4.2 sq mi)
- Elevation: 462 m (1,516 ft)

Population (2025-01-01)
  - Total: 87
  - Density: 7.9/km^{2} (20/sq mi)
- Time zone: UTC+1 (CET)
  - Summer (DST): UTC+2 (CEST)

Laperdiguera (Aragonese A Perdiguera) is a municipality located in the province of Huesca, Aragon, Spain. According to the 2004 census (INE), the municipality has a population of 103 inhabitants.

== See also ==
- List of municipalities in Huesca
