= Salas Altas =

Coordinates: 42°07′N 0°05′E

- municipality
- Flag Coat of arms

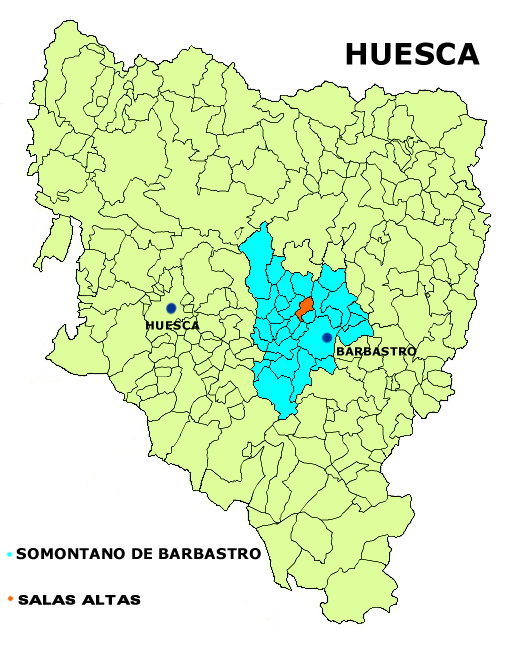
- Country: Spain
- Autonomous community: Aragon
- Province: Huesca
- Municipality: Salas Altas

Area
  - Total: 20 km^{2} (7.7 sq mi)

Population (2025-01-01)
  - Total: 301
  - Density: 15/km^{2} (39/sq mi)
- Time zone: UTC+1 (CET)
  - Summer (DST): UTC+2 (CEST)

Salas Altas is a municipality located in the province of Huesca, Aragon, Spain. According to the 2018 census (INE), the municipality has a population of 308 inhabitants.
