= Colungo =

Coordinates: 42°10′N 0°04′E

Colungo, Spain
- municipality
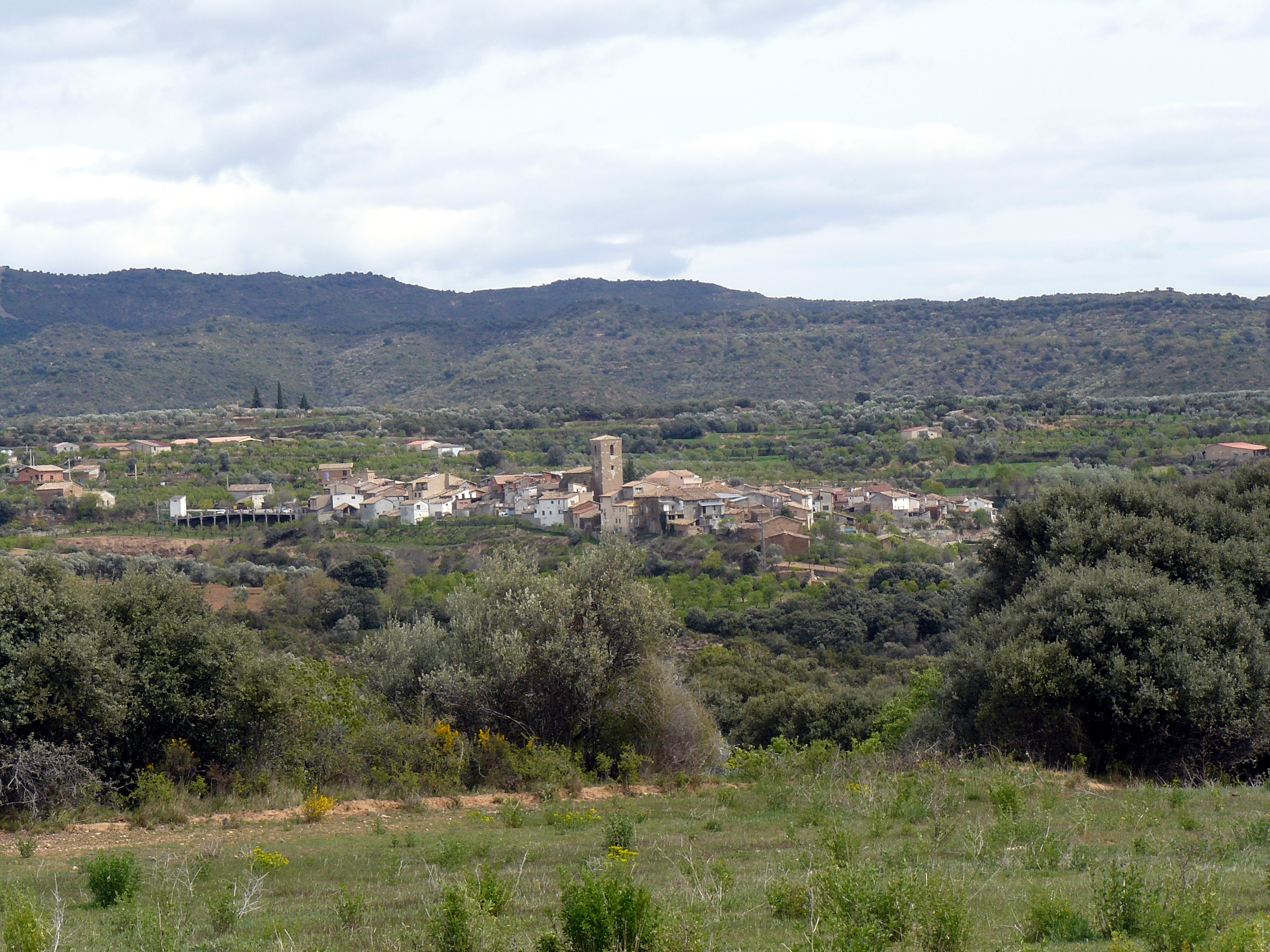
- Panoramic view of Colungo
- Interactive map of Colungo, Spain
- Country: Spain
- Autonomous community: Aragon
- Province: Huesca

Area
  - Total: 40 km^{2} (15 sq mi)

Population (2025-01-01)
  - Total: 124
  - Density: 3.1/km^{2} (8.0/sq mi)
- Time zone: UTC+1 (CET)
  - Summer (DST): UTC+2 (CEST)

Colungo is a municipality located in the province of Huesca, Aragon, Spain. According to the 2018 census (INE), the municipality has a population of 114 inhabitants.

== See also ==
- List of municipalities in Huesca
