= San Juan de Plan =

Coordinates: 42°35′N 0°21′E

San Juan de Plan (Spanish) San Chuan de Plan (Chistabin Aragonese)
- municipality
- Interactive map of San Juan de Plan (Spanish)
- Country: Spain
- Autonomous community: Aragon
- Province: Huesca
- Municipality: San Juan de Plan

Area
  - Total: 55 km^{2} (21 sq mi)

Population (2025-01-01)
  - Total: 145
  - Density: 2.6/km^{2} (6.8/sq mi)
- Time zone: UTC+1 (CET)
  - Summer (DST): UTC+2 (CEST)

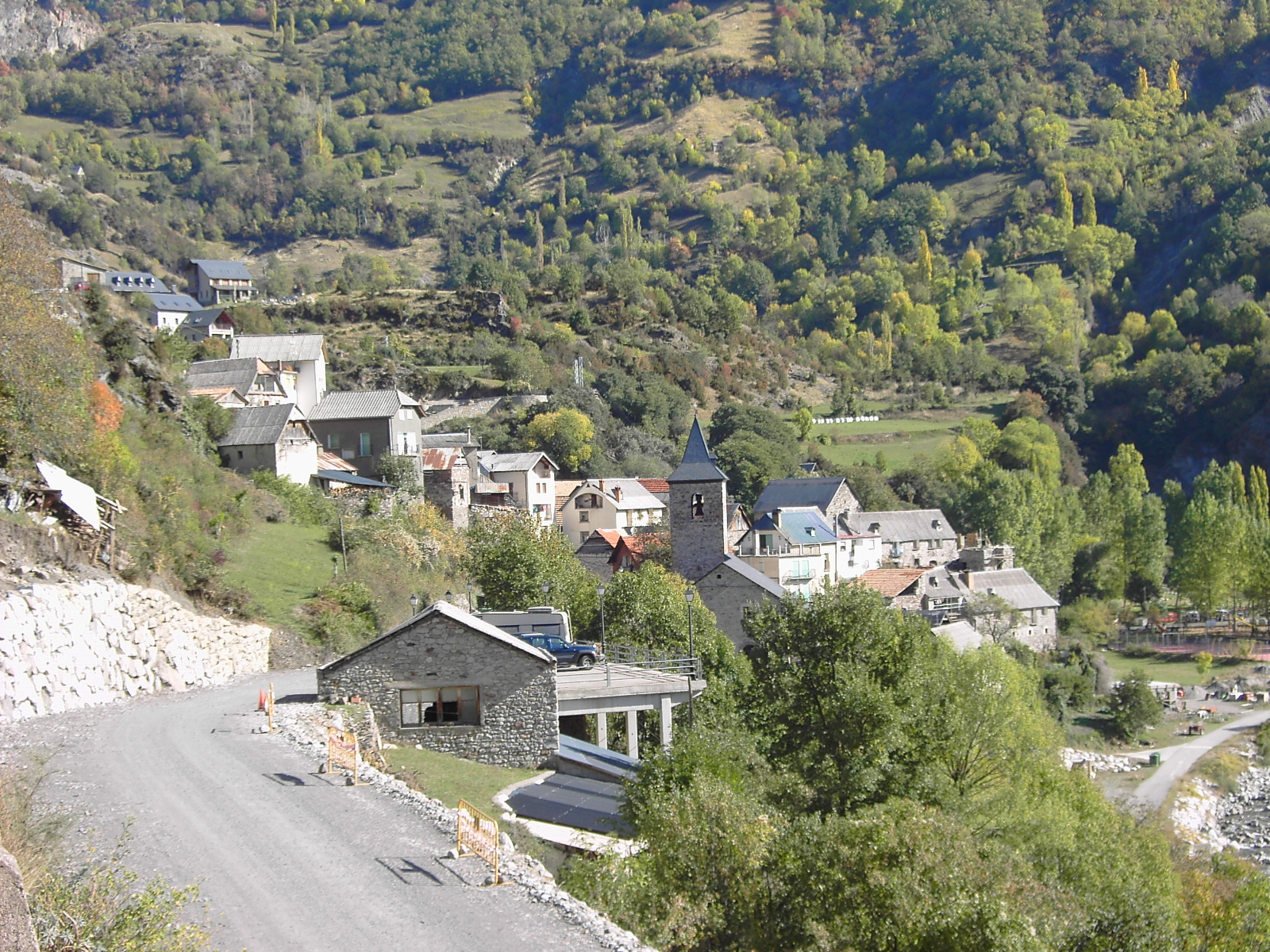
San Juan de Plan

San Juan de Plan (in Chistabin: San Chuan de Plan) is a municipality located northeast of Plan in the province of Huesca, Aragon, Spain, in the foothills of the Pyrenees. According to the 2018 census (INE), the municipality has a population of 152 inhabitants.

The Romanesque church of the former abbey of San Juan Bautista, for which the community is named, was enlarged in the sixteenth century. The sixteenth-century abbot's house now houses the ethnographic museum.

== See also ==
- List of municipalities in Huesca
