= Berbegal =

Municipality in Aragon, Spain

Coordinates: 41°57′N 0°00′E

- municipality
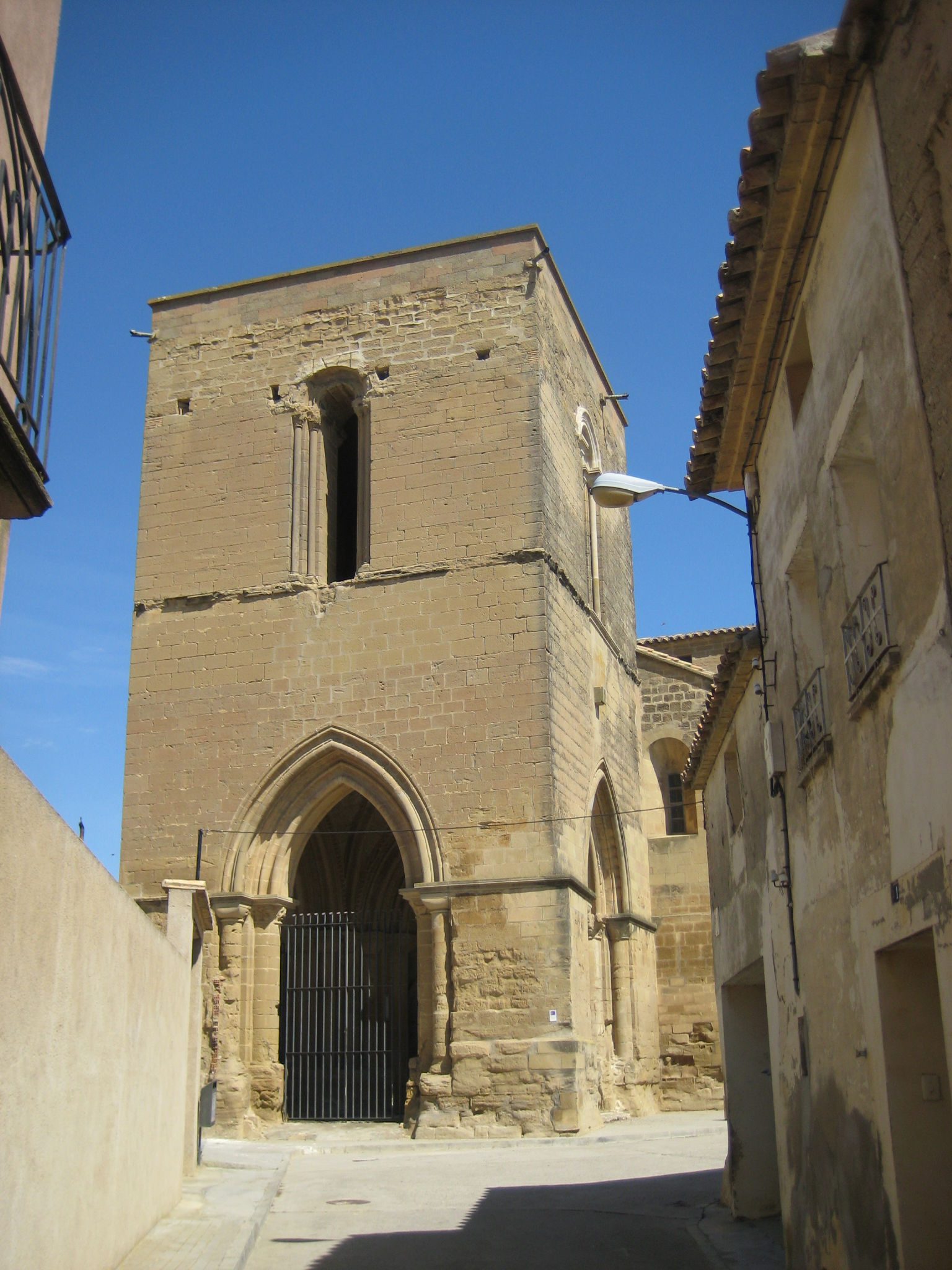
- Church of Santa María La Mayor Berbegal

- Coat of arms
- Interactive map of Berbegal
- Country: Spain
- Autonomous community: Aragon
- Province: Huesca
- Municipality: Berbegal

Area
  - Total: 49.03 km^{2} (18.93 sq mi)

Population (2025-01-01)
  - Total: 321
  - Density: 6.55/km^{2} (17.0/sq mi)
- Time zone: UTC+1 (CET)
  - Summer (DST): UTC+2 (CEST)

Berbegal is a municipality located in the province of Huesca, Aragon, Spain. According to the 2004 census (INE), the municipality has a population of 459 inhabitants.

== See also ==
- List of municipalities in Huesca
