= Castejón del Puente =

Municipality in Huesca, Aragon, Spain

Coordinates: 41°58′N 0°10′E

Castejón del Puente, Spain Castillón d'o Puent
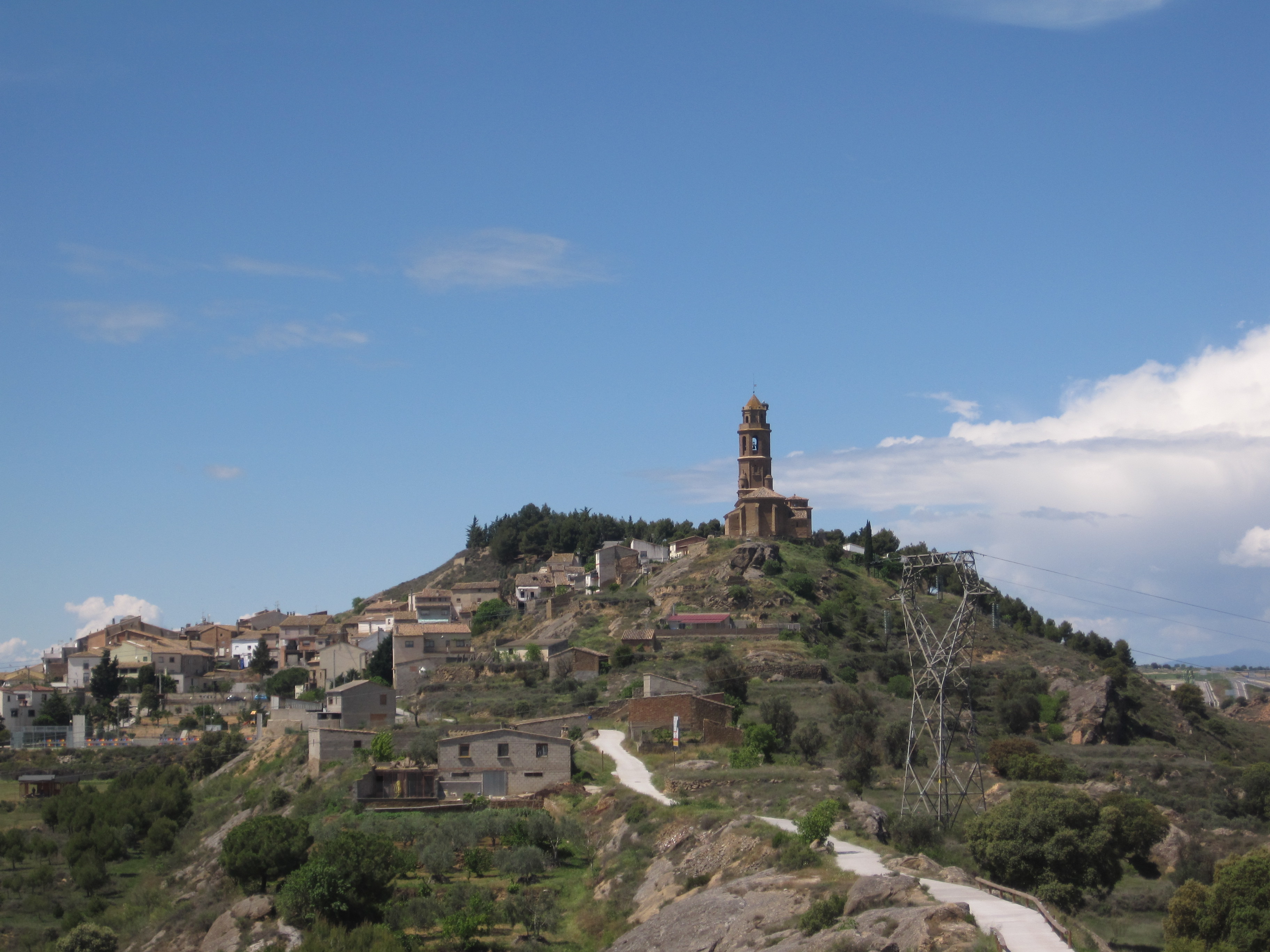
- Panoramic view

- Flag Coat of arms
- Interactive map of Castejón del Puente, Spain
- Country: Spain
- Autonomous community: Aragon
- Province: Huesca
- Municipality: Castejón del Puente

Area
  - Total: 25 km^{2} (9.7 sq mi)

Population (2025-01-01)
  - Total: 359
  - Density: 14/km^{2} (37/sq mi)
- Time zone: UTC+1 (CET)
  - Summer (DST): UTC+2 (CEST)

Castejón del Puente (Aragonese Castillón d'o Puent) is a municipality located in the province of Huesca, Aragon, Spain. According to the 2004 census (INE), the municipality has a population of 435 inhabitants.

== See also ==
- List of municipalities in Huesca
