= Ilche =

Coordinates: 41°57′N 0°03′E

- municipality
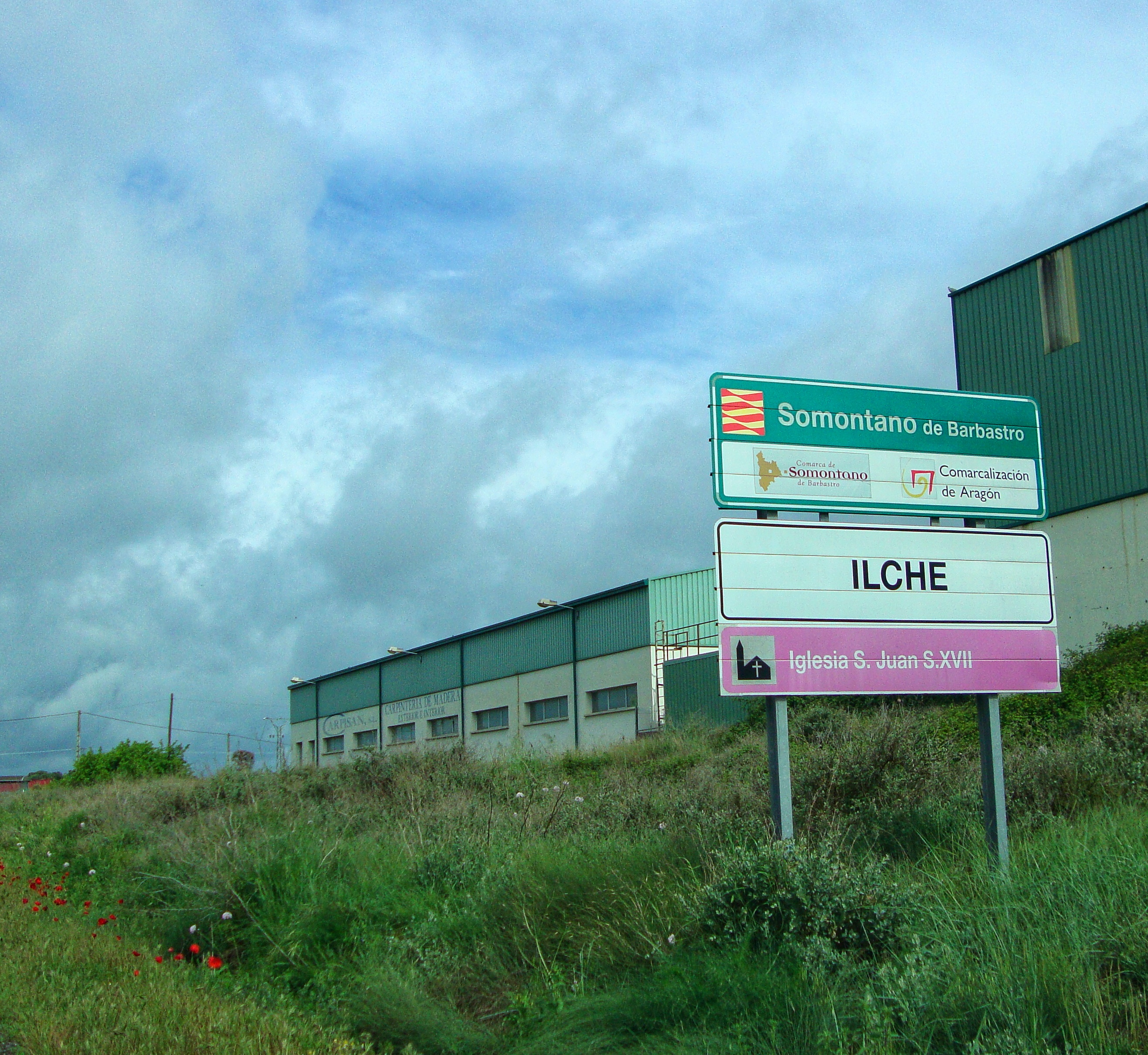
- Interactive map of Ilche
- Country: Spain
- Autonomous community: Aragon
- Province: Huesca

Area
  - Total: 63 km^{2} (24 sq mi)

Population (2025-01-01)
  - Total: 183
  - Density: 2.9/km^{2} (7.5/sq mi)
- Time zone: UTC+1 (CET)
  - Summer (DST): UTC+2 (CEST)

Ilche is a municipality located in the province of Huesca, Aragon, Spain. According to the 2018 census (INE), the municipality has a population of 212 inhabitants.

== See also ==
- List of municipalities in Huesca
