= Azlor =

Coordinates: 42°06′N 0°02′W

Azlor, Spain Aflor
- municipality
- Flag Coat of arms

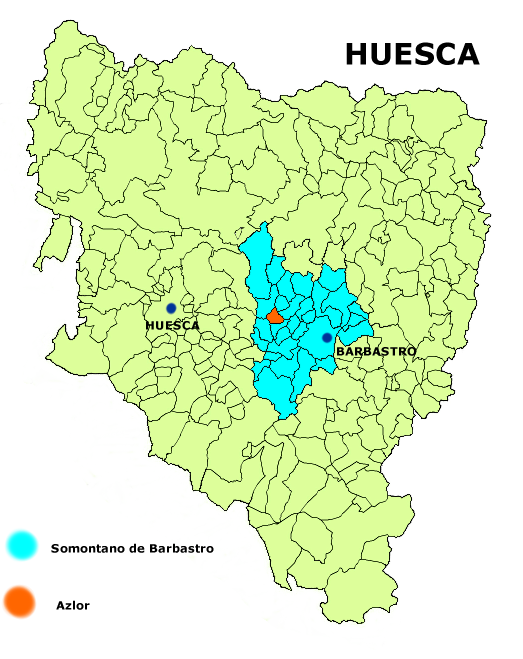
- Country: Spain
- Autonomous community: Aragon
- Province: Huesca
- Municipality: Azlor

Government
  - Mayor: María Isabel de Pablo Melero (Socialists' Party of Aragon)

Area
  - Total: 15 km^{2} (5.8 sq mi)

Population (2025-01-01)
  - Total: 155
  - Density: 10/km^{2} (27/sq mi)
- Time zone: UTC+1 (CET)
  - Summer (DST): UTC+2 (CEST)
- Postal code: 22311

Azlor (Aragonese Aflor) is a municipality located in the province of Huesca, Aragon, Spain. As of 2018, the municipality has a population of 153 inhabitants.

== See also ==
- List of municipalities in Huesca
