= Santa María de Dulcis =

Coordinates: 42°07′17″N 0°01′26″E

Santa María de Dulcis, Spain
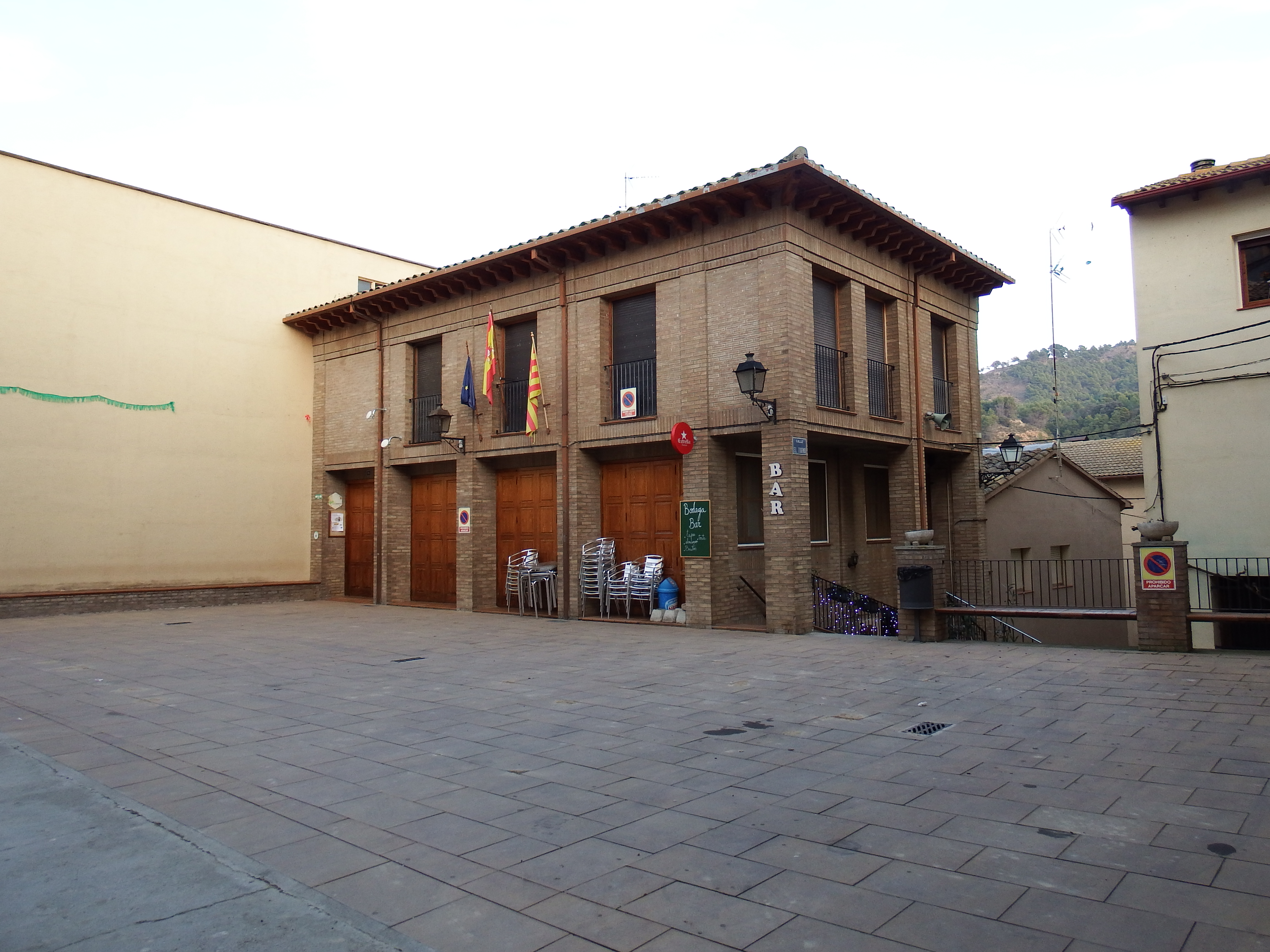
- Town hall in Huerta de Vero.
- Interactive map of Santa María de Dulcis, Spain
- Country: Spain
- Autonomous community: Aragon
- Province: Huesca
- Municipality: Santa María de Dulcis

Area
  - Total: 27 km^{2} (10 sq mi)

Population (2025-01-01)
  - Total: 206
  - Density: 7.6/km^{2} (20/sq mi)
- Time zone: UTC+1 (CET)
  - Summer (DST): UTC+2 (CEST)

Santa María de Dulcis is a municipality located in the province of Huesca, Aragon, Spain. According to the 2004 census (INE), the municipality has a population of 213 inhabitants.
