= Pozán de Vero =

Coordinates: 42°05′N 0°02′E

Pozán de Vero, Spain
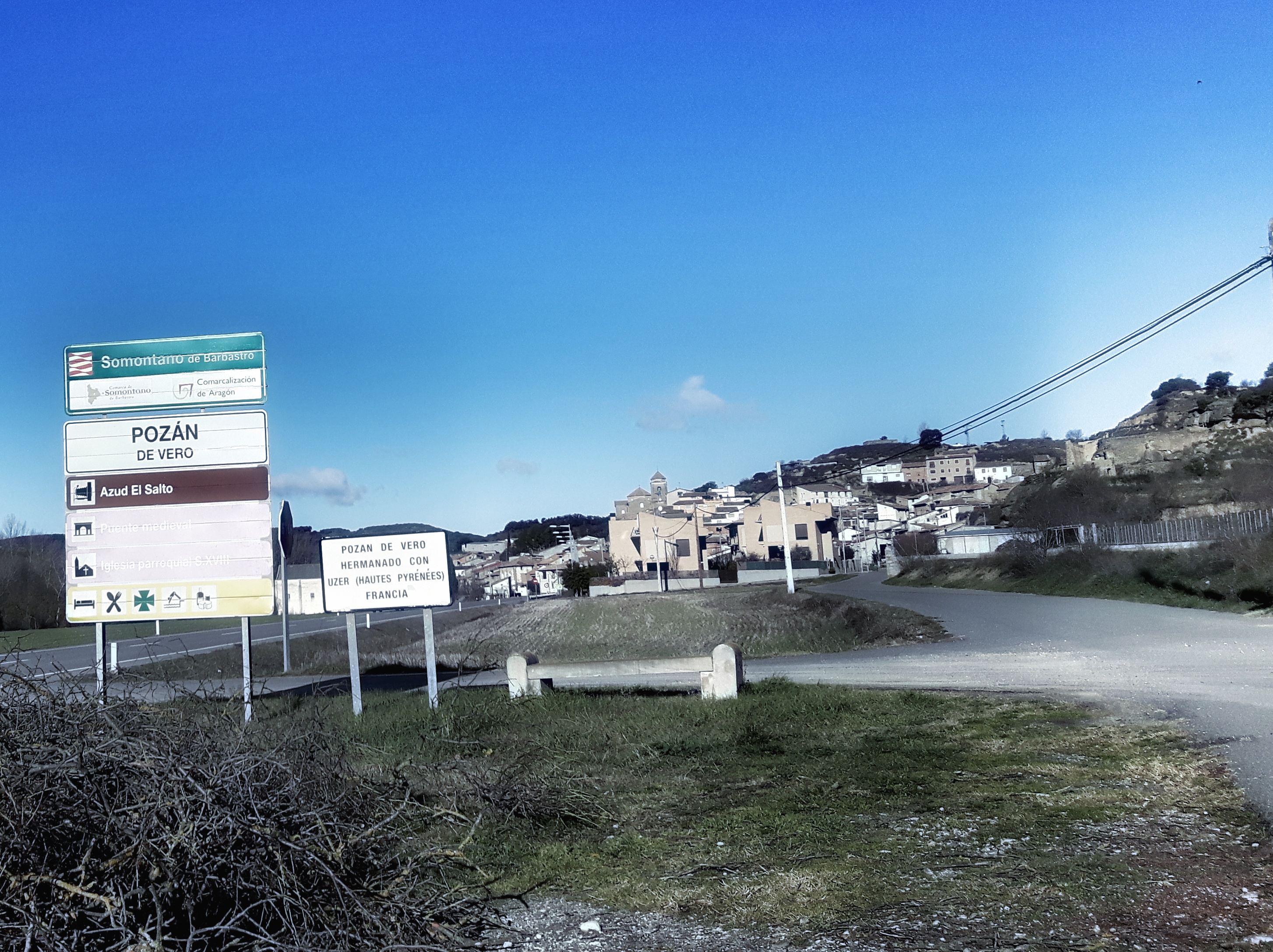

- Flag Coat of arms
- Interactive map of Pozán de Vero, Spain
- Country: Spain
- Autonomous community: Aragon
- Province: Huesca
- Municipality: Pozán de Vero

Area
  - Total: 14 km^{2} (5.4 sq mi)

Population (2025-01-01)
  - Total: 228
  - Density: 16/km^{2} (42/sq mi)
- Time zone: UTC+1 (CET)
  - Summer (DST): UTC+2 (CEST)

Pozán de Vero is a municipality located in the province of Huesca, Aragon, Spain. According to the 2004 census (INE), the municipality has a population of 244 inhabitants.

== See also ==
- List of municipalities in Huesca
