= Olvena =

Coordinates: 42°6.5′N 0°15.5′E

Olvena Olbena
- municipality
- Flag Coat of arms
- Interactive map of Olvena
- Country: Spain
- Autonomous community: Aragon
- Province: Huesca
- Municipality: Olvena

Area
  - Total: 15 km^{2} (5.8 sq mi)

Population (2025-01-01)
  - Total: 63
  - Density: 4.2/km^{2} (11/sq mi)
- Time zone: UTC+1 (CET)
  - Summer (DST): UTC+2 (CEST)

Olvena (Aragonese Olbena) is a municipality located in the province of Huesca, Aragon, Spain. According to the 2018 census (INE), the municipality has a population of 50 inhabitants.

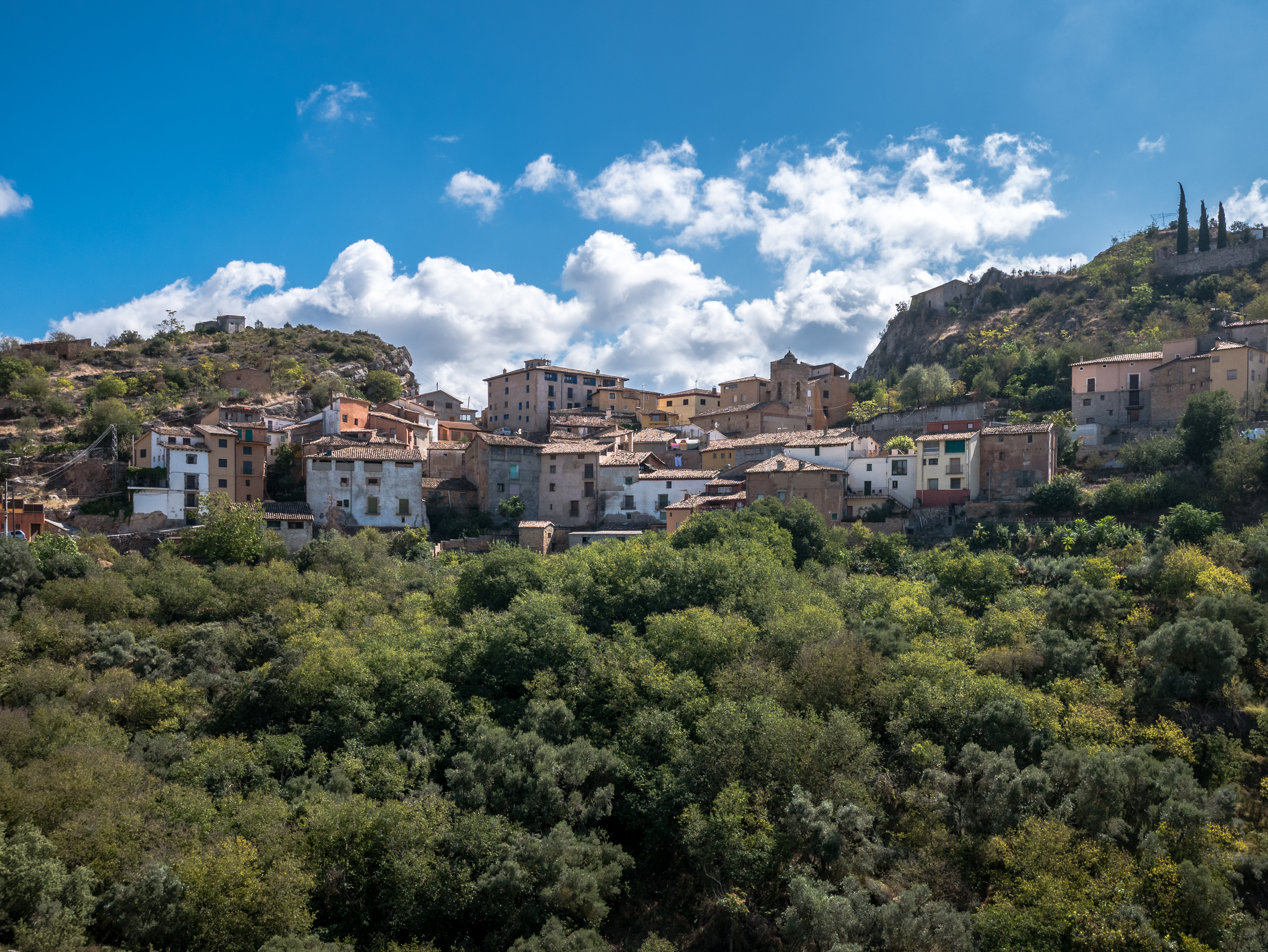
View of Olvena

== See also ==
- List of municipalities in Huesca
