= Hoz y Costean =

Coordinates: 42°8′0″N 0°8′0″E

Hoz y Costean Oz y Costeán
- municipality
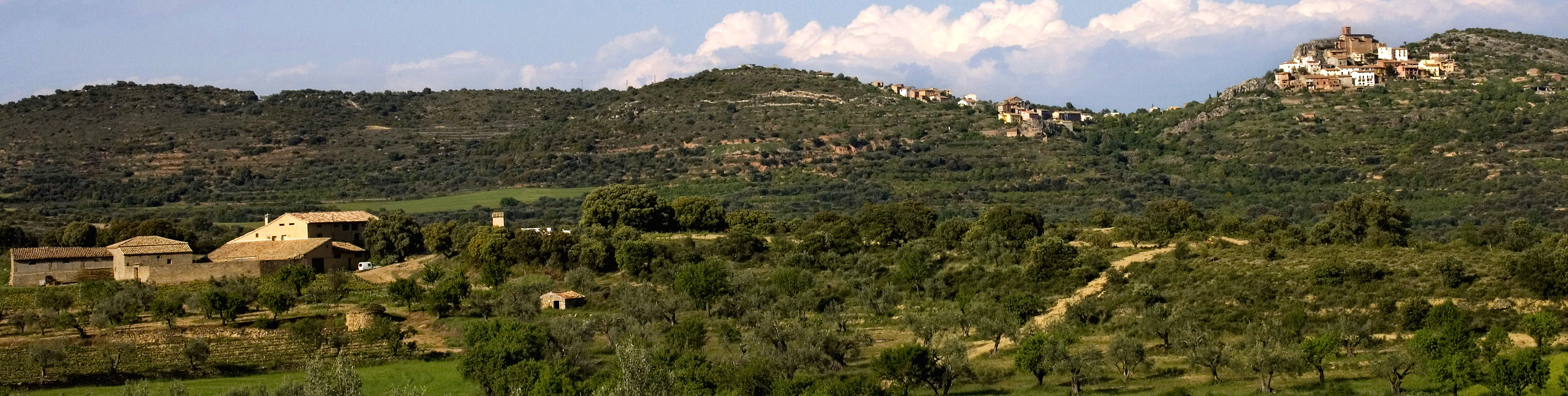
- Interactive map of Hoz y Costean
- Country: Spain
- Autonomous community: Aragon
- Province: Huesca

Area
  - Total: 57 km^{2} (22 sq mi)

Population (2025-01-01)
  - Total: 225
  - Density: 3.9/km^{2} (10/sq mi)
- Time zone: UTC+1 (CET)
  - Summer (DST): UTC+2 (CEST)

Hoz y Costean (Aragonese Oz y Costeán) is a municipality located in the province of Huesca, Aragon, Spain. According to the 2004 census (INE), the municipality has a population of 230 inhabitants.

== See also ==
- List of municipalities in Huesca
