= Alcalá de Gurrea =

Coordinates: 42°04′N 0°41′W

Alcalá de Gurrea, Spain
- Flag Coat of arms
- Interactive map of Alcalá de Gurrea, Spain
- Country: Spain
- Autonomous community: Aragon
- Province: Huesca
- Municipality: Alcalá de Gurrea

Area
  - Total: 77.49 km^{2} (29.92 sq mi)
- Elevation: 461 m (1,512 ft)

Population (2025-01-01)
  - Total: 265
  - Density: 3.42/km^{2} (8.86/sq mi)
- Time zone: UTC+1 (CET)
  - Summer (DST): UTC+2 (CEST)

Alcalá de Gurrea is a municipality located in the province of Huesca, Aragon, Spain. According to the 2004 census (INE), the municipality had a population of 292 inhabitants.

== See also ==
- List of municipalities in Huesca
