= Salas Bajas =

Coordinates: 42°06′N 0°05′E

- municipality
- Flag Coat of arms
- Interactive map of Salas Bajas
- Country: Spain
- Autonomous community: Aragon
- Province: Huesca

Area
  - Total: 12 km^{2} (4.6 sq mi)

Population (2025-01-01)
  - Total: 184
  - Density: 15/km^{2} (40/sq mi)
- Time zone: UTC+1 (CET)
  - Summer (DST): UTC+2 (CEST)

Salas Bajas is a municipality located in the province of Huesca, Aragon, Spain. According to the 2022 census (INE), the municipality has a population of 190 inhabitants.
