= Gistaín =

Coordinates: 42°36′N 0°20′E

Gistaín (Spanish) Chistén (Aragonese)
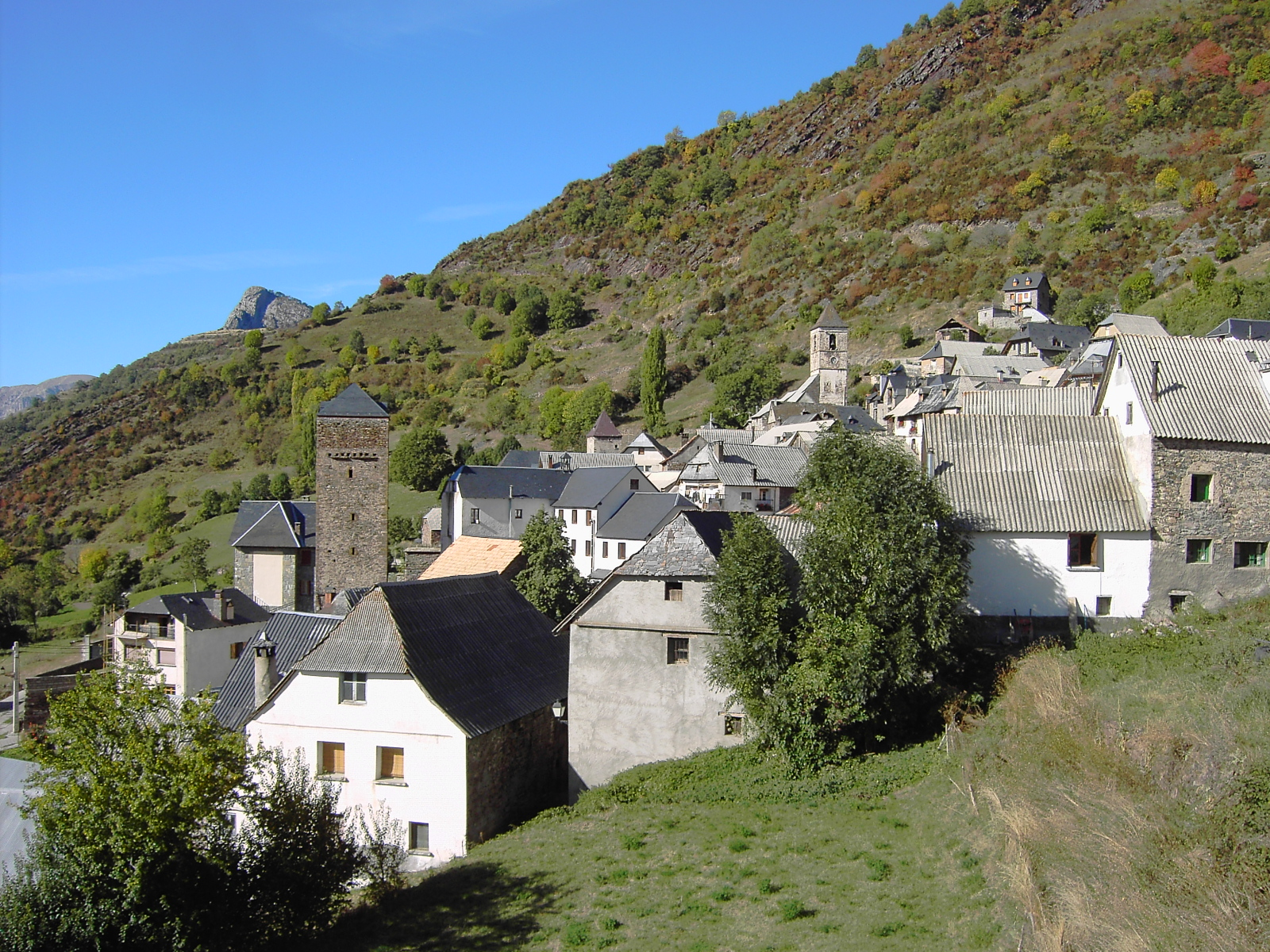
- Interactive map of Gistaín (Spanish)
- Country: Spain
- Autonomous community: Aragon
- Province: Huesca
- Municipality: Gistaín

Area
  - Total: 76 km^{2} (29 sq mi)

Population (2025-01-01)
  - Total: 114
  - Density: 1.5/km^{2} (3.9/sq mi)
- Time zone: UTC+1 (CET)
  - Summer (DST): UTC+2 (CEST)

Gistaín (in Aragonese: Chistén; and officially Gistaín/Chistén) is a municipality located in the province of Huesca, Aragon, Spain. According to the 2004 census (INE), the municipality has a population of 161 inhabitants.

== See also ==
- List of municipalities in Huesca
