= Las Almunias de Rodellar =

- Village
- Location in Aragon Location in Spain
- Country: Spain
- Autonomous community: Aragon
- Province: Huesca
- Comarca: Somontano de Barbastro
- Municipality: Bierge
- Elevation: 699 m (2,293 ft)

Population (2024)
  - Total: 14
- Postal code: 22144
- Valley: Valle de Rodellar
- Judicial district: Barbastro
- INE code: 22058000101

Las Almunias de Rodellar (As Almunias or As Almunietas in Aragonese) is a village in the municipality of Bierge, in the Somontano de Barbastro comarca, Province of Huesca, Aragon, Spain. It is located in the Rodellar valley, within the Sierra y Cañones de Guara Natural Park, at an elevation of 699 metres above sea level.

Historically, it belonged to the former municipality of Rodellar, which was incorporated into Bierge in 1970. The village retains examples of the traditional architecture of the valley and lies in an area characterised by the karst landscape and river canyons of the Sierra de Guara.

== Toponymy ==
The traditional name of the village in the Aragonese speech of the valley is As Almunias. Philologist Jesús Vázquez Obrador derives the place name from the Arabic al múnya, meaning "orchard" or "farm".

Vázquez Obrador states that the earliest known documentary reference to Las Almunias is relatively late, dating from the 16th century. Antonio Durán Gudiol likewise records the settlement under the name Las Almunias and notes its ecclesiastical dependence on Rodellar.

The traditional toponymy of the surrounding area preserves numerous elements of the Aragonese lexicon. Among the place names documented by Vázquez Obrador in Las Almunias are Loma Buega, Monte San Juan, Paúl, Costeras, Ferreras, Sarrato, Terreros, Toscar, Compillón, Faja o Torno, Güerto largo, Suerte and Tozal d'o Vichar.

== Geography ==
=== Location and relief ===
Las Almunias de Rodellar is located in the municipality of Bierge, in the Somontano de Barbastro comarca of the Province of Huesca. The village lies in the Rodellar valley, south of Rodellar, at an elevation of 699 metres.

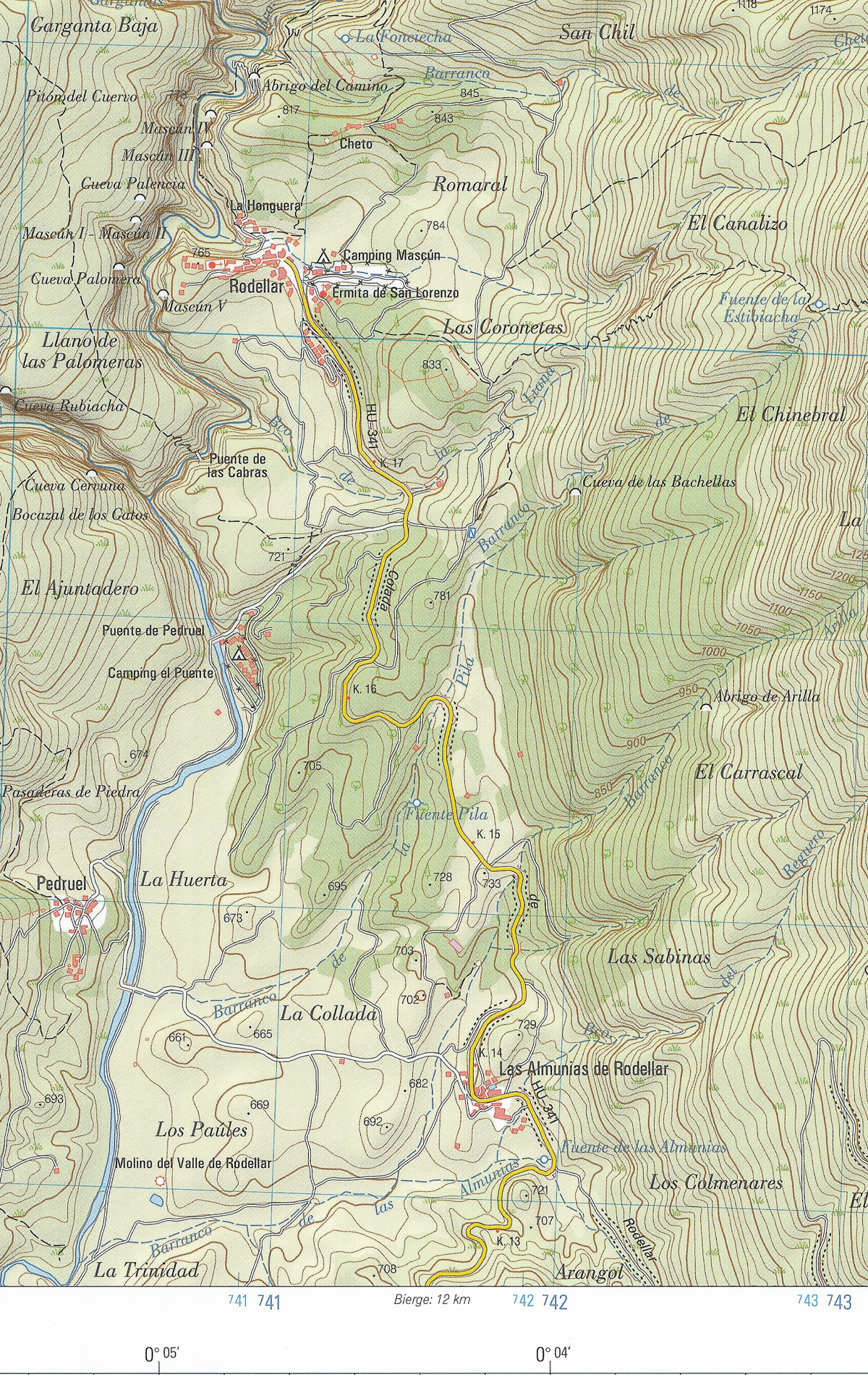
Topographic map of Las Almunias de Rodellar and its surroundings, showing Rodellar, Pedruel and the Alcanadre River valley.

The village is built on a hillside, with its buildings following the contours of the terrain. Between the settlement and the Alcanadre River lie areas traditionally used as farmland and vegetable gardens.

The Rodellar valley forms part of the Pre-Pyrenean limestone ranges of Guara. Geologically, limestone formations predominate in the Sierra de Guara, particularly the Eocene limestones of the Guara Formation, although softer terrigenous materials also occur in the Rodellar and Fabana valleys. The limestone geology of the area and the processes of karstification have shaped both the landscape and the circulation of surface and groundwater.

The incision of watercourses into the limestone formations has created rugged terrain characterised by ravines, narrow gorges and canyons, which are among the most distinctive features of the landscape in this part of the Sierra de Guara.

=== Hydrography ===
The Alcanadre River is the principal watercourse in the surroundings of Las Almunias and one of the main hydrographic axes of the Sierra de Guara. From the village, the land descends towards the river through former agricultural and grazing areas. Downstream, the river becomes confined once again between limestone walls, forming part of the canyon system characteristic of the Sierra de Guara.

Water circulation in this area is strongly influenced by the karstification of the limestone formations. Where watercourses cross these formations, they may lose discharge or receive water from springs as a result of underground water circulation.

Hydrochemical studies carried out in the Rodellar valley also document a watercourse named barranco de Las Almunias, included among the sampling points used in studies of the area's natural waters.

To the east of the village flows the Isuala River, also known as Balcés or Balced. Its canyon is separated from the Alcanadre valley by the sierra de Balcés. The route between Alquézar and Las Almunias now followed by the Camino Natural del Somontano crosses the river at the place known as Tranco de las Olas before ascending towards the collado de Las Almunias.

=== Natural environment ===
Las Almunias de Rodellar lies within the Sierra y Cañones de Guara Natural Park. The village is included in one of the compatible-use zones established under the protected area's management plan.

The surrounding territory also forms part of the Natura 2000 network of protected areas in the Sierra de Guara and lies within the "Sierra y Cañones de Guara" Special Protection Area for birds.

The landscape around the village combines former agricultural and grazing areas close to the settlement with slopes covered by scrubland and woodland. This is complemented by the landscapes associated with the area's watercourses and the karst landforms of the limestone terrain, including the ravines, narrow gorges and canyons characteristic of the Sierra de Guara.

== History ==
The date of the foundation of Las Almunias de Rodellar is unknown. The earliest known documentary reference identified by philologist Jesús Vázquez Obrador dates from the 16th century.

Within the historical ecclesiastical organisation of the valley, Las Almunias was a dependent church of the parish of Rodellar, together with Nasarre, Pedruel, San Hipólito and Ballabriga.

In 1646, Las Almunias had four households. Administratively, it belonged to the former municipality of Rodellar. In 1970, the voluntary merger of the municipalities of Bierge and Rodellar was approved by Decree 937/1970 of 21 March, creating a single municipality under the name of Bierge, with Bierge as its administrative centre. Las Almunias has formed part of the municipality of Bierge since then.

During the second half of the 20th century, Las Almunias underwent a marked process of depopulation, similar to that experienced by many settlements in the Sierra de Guara. This process also altered the traditional ways of life and mechanisms of cultural transmission in the valley.

=== Traditional economy ===
The traditional economy of Las Almunias was based primarily on subsistence farming, livestock raising and various occupations connected with the use of local natural resources. Occupations documented in the village included wooden-spoon maker, farmer, road worker, charcoal burner, shepherd and livestock dealer.

One of the most notable traditional crafts was the manufacture of spoons and other objects from boxwood, a material abundant in the Sierra de Guara. Spoon-making was passed down through some families for several generations and survived in Las Almunias until the late 20th century. A study of boxwood craftsmanship documents a miller and spoon-maker from the village who had learned the craft from his father and grandfather, indicating that the family tradition dated back at least to the beginning of the 20th century. His work was photographed in 1984 and filmed in 1994.

Charcoal production was another traditional use of the area's forest resources, alongside agricultural and livestock activities. The presence of road workers and livestock dealers among the occupations documented in the village also reflects the diversity of work undertaken by its inhabitants within a rural economy based on a combination of different activities.

Among the facilities associated with these activities was the flour mill of the Rodellar valley, situated beside the Alcanadre River. It used water channelled through a millrace diverted from the river. The millers lived in Las Almunias and travelled to the mill to work. During the 1940s, the hydraulic installation also began to be used to generate electricity for several settlements in the valley.

From the mid-20th century, the gathering of black truffles also provided supplementary income for local households.

=== Transformation of the village ===
The opening of the road between Bierge and Rodellar in 1931 changed both the traditional communications of the valley and the physical layout of Las Almunias. The new road passed through the built-up area, leaving some houses and the church above the road and other houses and the former school below it.

Subsequent depopulation during the second half of the 20th century considerably reduced the number of permanent residents and changed traditional patterns of occupation and use of the village buildings.

=== Economic transformation and tourism ===
During the final decades of the 20th century, tourism-related activities became increasingly important in the economy of Las Almunias de Rodellar, encouraged by its location in the Sierra de Guara and the growth of nature and adventure tourism in the surrounding area. This resulted in gradual diversification away from the farming, livestock raising and traditional occupations that had previously characterised the local economy.

Tourism development led to the establishment of accommodation and restaurant businesses. These include Albergue Las Almunias and the present-day Guara Inlukā hotel and restaurant, formerly known as Casa Tejedor. The latter continued operating under new management following the retirement of its previous owners, adopting the name Guara Inlukā.

Albergue Las Almunias is another accommodation establishment in the village and is documented alongside Casa Tejedor in tourism information for the Sierra de Guara.

Outdoor tourism is also an economic activity associated with the village. The Government of Aragon's register of active-tourism companies lists businesses in Las Almunias offering activities including canyoning, rock climbing, hiking, mountaineering, trekking, via ferrata routes and orienteering. Among the businesses associated with this sector is Expediciones, based in Las Almunias de Rodellar.

Alongside tourism, the village retains activities connected with livestock farming and food production. In 2000, the Quesos de Guara cheese dairy was established in Las Almunias through the conversion of a traditional sheep farm. The company produces sheep's and goat's milk cheeses, thereby maintaining an activity connected with the village's livestock-raising tradition.

== Demography ==
At the beginning of the 20th century, Las Almunias had more than one hundred inhabitants. Its population was 104 in 1900 and declined overall during the following decades, to 74 inhabitants in 1920, 53 in 1950 and 43 in 1970.

The decline accelerated during the second half of the 20th century, and by 1981 the population had fallen to 19. The village subsequently maintained a small population, with 17 inhabitants in both 1991 and 2001 and 18 in 2004. It had 15 inhabitants in 2019 and 14 in 2024.

Population of Las Almunias de Rodellar
1900	1910	1920	1930	1940	1950	1960	1970	1981	1991	2001	2004	2019	2024
104	99	74	67	71	53	52	43	19	17	17	18	15	14

== Heritage ==
=== Parish church of Santa María Obispo ===
The parish church of Las Almunias is dedicated to Santa María Obispo and stands in the upper part of the village. It is a vernacular building dating from the 17th century.

Historically, it was a dependent church of the parish of Rodellar.

=== Ermita de la Trinidad ===
The Ermita de la Trinidad is located southwest of Las Almunias, approximately two kilometres from the village, on a promontory on the left bank of the Alcanadre River. It is a rectangular building constructed of roughly dressed stone and masonry, with buttressed corners and a gabled stone-slab roof, partly renovated with traditional curved roof tiles.

The Sistema de Información del Patrimonio Cultural Aragonés dates its construction to between the 17th and 18th centuries. Ownership and maintenance of the hermitage have traditionally been shared by the villages of Las Almunias, Pedruel and San Saturnino.

=== Traditional architecture ===
The village retains various examples of the vernacular architecture characteristic of the Sierra de Guara and the Rodellar valley. Among its most recognisable features are the large traditional chimneys, some circular or truncated-conical in form, as well as stone doorways, wooden doors and coats of arms.

The layout of the village follows the contours of the hillside on which it stands. Traditionally, the farmland and vegetable gardens belonging to the village extended between the built-up area and the Alcanadre River.

=== Molino del Valle de Rodellar ===
On the banks of the Alcanadre River stands the Molino del Valle de Rodellar, a former flour mill that used water carried through a millrace diverted from the river. The building retains components and mechanisms associated with its former milling activity.

The millers lived in Las Almunias and travelled to the mill to work. Payment for milling was made in kind through the system known as multura, whereby a quantity was deducted from each load of wheat milled.

During the 1940s, the hydraulic installation also began to be used for electricity generation. In 1949, an application by Rodellar Town Council was recorded for the installation of a high-voltage line, distribution networks and transformer stations to provide lighting and power to Rodellar-Cheto, Las Almunias, Pedruel and San Saturnino. The electricity was generated at what was then known as the Molino de Rodellar, with a voltage of 3,386 volts and a planned transmission capacity of 15 kVA.

The available water supply did not allow milling and electricity generation to operate simultaneously. The hydraulic power was therefore used for milling during the day and for electricity generation at night. Because of this second role, the miller also became known as the lucero. Both activities ceased during the second half of the 20th century.

=== Astronomical observatory ===
Las Almunias has an open-air astronomical observatory intended for observation of and education about the night sky.

The facility includes an area for setting up telescopes, a projection screen, four reclining seats for observation and four interpretive panels devoted to the night sky visible during the different seasons of the year.

The observatory is used for astronomical observation and outreach activities organised by, among others, Bierge Town Council and the Agrupación Astronómica de Huesca.

== Houses and traditional house names ==
As in other settlements of Alto Aragón, the casa traditionally constituted a unit of family and household identity in Las Almunias de Rodellar. Individual houses in the village were known by their own names, which could be retained over generations regardless of the surnames of their occupants.

Philologist Jesús Vázquez Obrador, in his 1979 study of the toponymy of the Rodellar valley, documented the house names Escartín, Salas, Urbán, Cancer, Mairal, Molinero, Tixidor, Silverio, Tomasa, Fabiané and Gabarre in Las Almunias. These names also appear in the toponymic register of the Instituto Geográfico de Aragón. Later sources also record other house names, including O Cubero, Lorenzo, Melchora, O Sastre and Juana, as well as variants of some of the earlier names.

The opening of the road between Bierge and Rodellar in 1931 altered the traditional layout of the village. Casa Tejedor, Casa Silverio and Casa O Cubero stood in the upper part; on the other side of the road were Casa Lorenzo, Casa El Molinero, Casa Escartín, Casa Salas, Casa Melchora and Casa Cancer; while Casa Fabianer, Casa Gabarre, Casa Juana and Casa O Sastre formed the area known as a Punta Lugar. The construction of the road also resulted in the disappearance of Casa O Cubero and Casa Mairal, which were demolished to make way for the new road.

The persistence of this traditional system of household identification is also documented in the early 21st century. The oral-tradition survey carried out between 2000 and 2002 by the Instituto de Estudios Altoaragoneses records the continued use of the names casa Salas and casa Lorenzo to identify family origin within the village.

Among the houses documented in the sources, together with other names preserved through local tradition, are:

- Casa Cáncer.
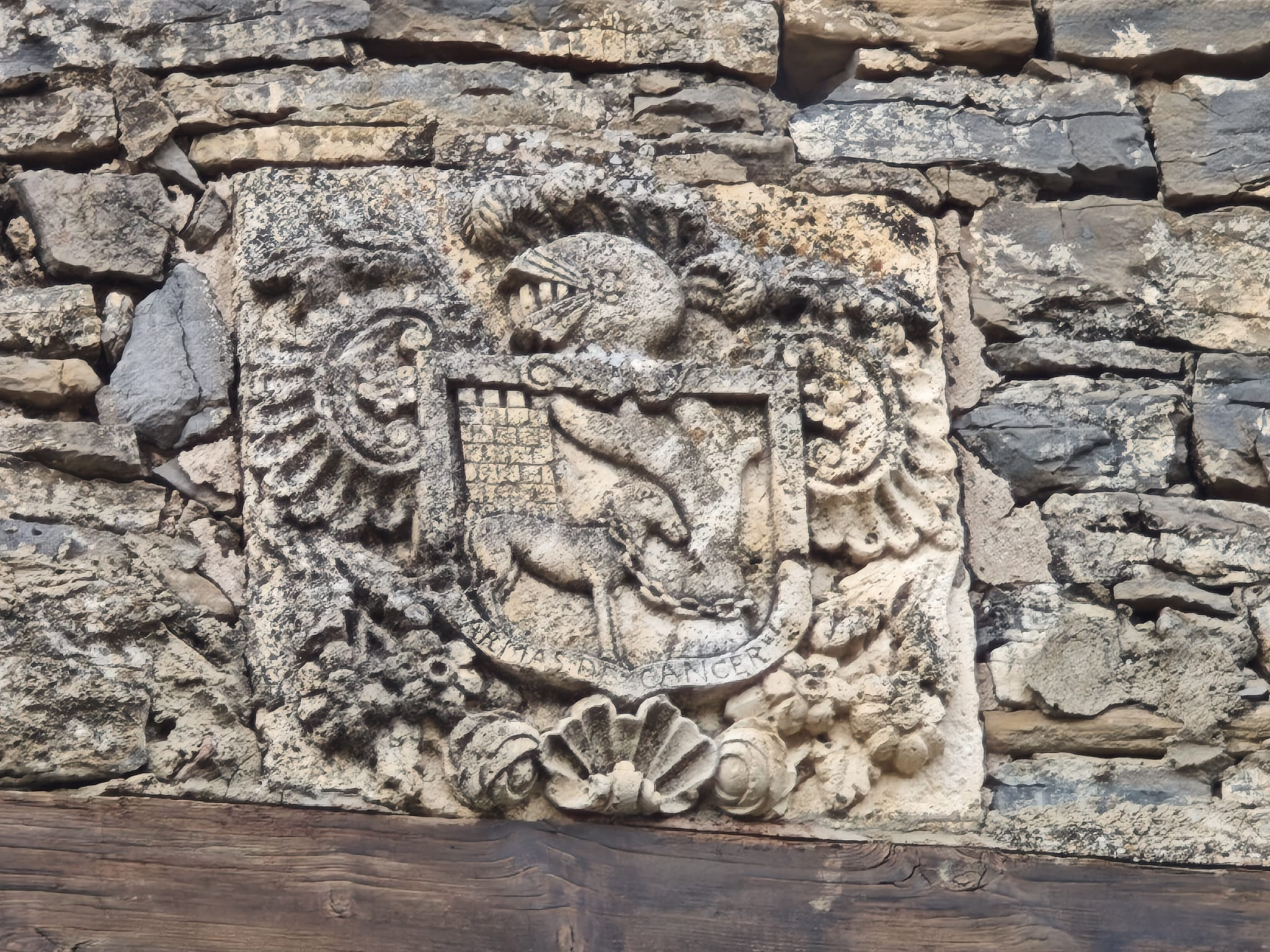
  Coat of arms on Casa Cáncer.
  One of the most distinctive buildings in Las Almunias de Rodellar, its façade retains a coat of arms and a stone voussoir doorway. The keystone bears the inscription "DOMINGO BIBAN AÑO 1761". Vázquez Obrador documented the name Cancer, without an accent mark, in 1979, a form that also appears in later sources. The house name is also preserved in the agricultural microtoponymy of the surrounding area, where a Paúl de Cáncer is documented.
- Casa Escartín. Documented under this name by Vázquez Obrador in 1979, it is among the houses situated on the other side of the road. Its name is also preserved in local microtoponymy and in rural structures associated with the house, including o Campillón de Casa Escartín, Arnal d'Escartín and Corral d'Escartín.
- Casa Fabiané. Vázquez Obrador documented this form in 1979. Later sources record the variants Fabianer and Fabián. It stood in the a Punta Lugar area, near the end of the old path from Rodellar. The name is also associated with o Pajar de Fabianer.
- Casa Gabarre. Documented by Vázquez Obrador in 1979, it stood in the a Punta Lugar area. The old path between Rodellar and Las Almunias also retains o Pajar de Gabarre, a structure associated with the house that was built in the mid-1950s using stone and mud. The house name also occurs in the local microtoponym Articón de Gabarre.
- Casa Juana. Recorded in later sources among the houses in a Punta Lugar, at one end of the village.
- Casa Lorenzo. It was among the houses situated on the other side of the road. Its name continued to be used in the early 21st century as a traditional means of identifying family origin.
- Casa Mairal. Documented under this name by Vázquez Obrador in 1979. The building was later demolished to make way for the road through the village.
- Casa Melchora. Recorded in later sources among the houses situated on the other side of the road.
- Casa Molinero. Vázquez Obrador documented the form Molinero in 1979. Later sources use the names Casa El Molinero and Casa o Molino and locate it on the other side of the road.
- Casa O Cubero. It stood in the upper part of the village. The building was demolished when the road was constructed, as was Casa Mairal. Although the house itself disappeared, its name survives in the local microtoponym a Biña o Cubero.
- Casa O Sastre. Recorded in later sources in the a Punta Lugar area, together with Casa Fabianer, Casa Gabarre and Casa Juana.
- Casa Salas. Documented by Vázquez Obrador in 1979, it was among the houses situated on the other side of the road. The name continued to be used in the early 21st century as a traditional means of identifying family origin. The register of structures compiled by the Grupo de Descriptores Geográficos de Aragón also documents an arnal de casa Salas in Las Almunias. The name Arnal de Salas is also recorded in the Atlas de toponimia of the Rodellar valley.
- Casa Silverio. Documented by Vázquez Obrador in 1979. Later sources place it in the upper part of the village, together with Casa Tejedor and Casa O Cubero.
- Casa Tejedor. Later sources place it in the upper part of the village. Vázquez Obrador had documented the form Tixidor in 1979. The name Casa Tejedor subsequently continued to be used by tourism establishments in Las Almunias.
- Casa Tomasa. Documented under this name by Vázquez Obrador in 1979.
- Casa Urbán. Documented under this name by Vázquez Obrador in 1979.

== Oral tradition ==
Las Almunias de Rodellar was one of the villages included in an oral-tradition recovery project carried out by the Instituto de Estudios Altoaragoneses in western Somontano. Fieldwork conducted between 2000 and 2002 collected testimonies from people native to the village as part of a study intended to document and preserve the oral heritage of this area of Alto Aragón.

The research collected different forms of oral tradition, including narratives, songs, ethnotexts, dances, minor genres and traditional vocabulary. Las Almunias was among the settlements studied in the Rodellar valley and its surroundings, in a context marked by depopulation and the gradual disappearance of traditional mechanisms for the intergenerational transmission of oral culture.

== Festivals and traditions ==
The main festival of Las Almunias de Rodellar is held on 11 November in honour of San Martín, while a smaller festival takes place on 15 August, the feast of the Assumption of Mary.

Another traditional celebration associated with the village is the pilgrimage to the Ermita de la Trinidad, historically shared by the inhabitants of Las Almunias, Pedruel and San Saturnino. The three villages also share ownership of the hermitage and responsibility for its maintenance.

The pilgrimage was traditionally held on Trinity Sunday, the first Sunday after Pentecost. The inhabitants of the three villages travelled to the hermitage for the religious service and afterwards gathered nearby for a communal meal and dancing.

== Transport ==
The main road serving Las Almunias de Rodellar is the HU-341, which connects Bierge with Rodellar and runs through the Rodellar valley. The road forms part of the autonomous road network of Aragon and begins at its junction with the A-1227 in Bierge.

The road between Bierge and Rodellar was built in 1931. Its opening changed the valley's traditional communications and affected the layout of Las Almunias by passing through the village and dividing its buildings between the two sides of the new road.

A road from the vicinity of Las Almunias also provides access to Pedruel, a village situated beside the Alcanadre River.

== Hiking ==
Las Almunias de Rodellar is a stopping point on the Camino Natural del Somontano de Barbastro, a hiking route of more than 50 kilometres that crosses part of the Sierra de Guara, following old paths and tracks that were subsequently restored and signposted. Much of the route runs within the Sierra y Cañones de Guara Natural Park.

The village is the endpoint of the second stage of the Camino Natural, which begins in Alquézar, and the starting point of the third stage, which continues towards Pedruel and Salto de Bierge.

The stage between Alquézar and Las Almunias is 21.1 kilometres long, including the branch incorporated into the official route. It passes through Radiquero and continues towards the canyon of the Isuala River, also known as Balcés. Places crossed by the route include barranco de Cautiecho, puente de las Brujas, Tranco de las Olas and collado de Las Almunias. From the latter, the trail descends towards the village through land traditionally used for crops and grazing.

The third stage, 18.9 kilometres long, starts at Las Almunias and runs largely through the surroundings of the Alcanadre River. After leaving the vicinity of the village, it descends towards Pedruel, where the pasaderas de Pedruel provide a traditional means of crossing the river using stones placed in its channel. The route then continues towards Peña Falconera, also known as Huevo de Morrano, fuente de la Tamara and estrechos del Puntillo before reaching Salto de Bierge.

In addition to the Camino Natural, the Crestas del Balced route starts at Las Almunias and follows the high ground between the drainage basins of the Alcanadre and Isuala or Balcés rivers. The route climbs from the vicinity of the village along old paths and later descends towards Rodellar, passing through areas where traditional dry-stone walls formerly used to delimit paths and agricultural plots have been preserved.

The surrounding area also retains a network of traditional paths linking Las Almunias with other settlements and places in the Rodellar valley, including Rodellar and Pedruel, as well as routes along the banks of the Alcanadre where the former Molino del Valle and the Ermita de la Trinidad are located.

== Bibliography ==
- Vázquez Obrador, Jesús (1979). "Toponimia de Pedruel, Las Almunias y San Hipólito (valle de Rodellar)". Argensola (in Spanish) (87): 103–134.
- Durán Gudiol, Antonio (1961). "Geografía medieval de los obispados de Jaca y Huesca". Argensola (in Spanish) (45–46). Huesca: Instituto de Estudios Oscenses: 1–103.
- Buera Olivera, Javier; Cuchí Oterino, José Antonio; Manso Alonso, José Antonio (1997). "Hidroquímica de las aguas naturales de los sectores occidental y central de la Sierra de Guara (Huesca)". Lucas Mallada (in Spanish) (9): 35–63.
- Araguás Pueyo, Sandra; Muñoz Torrijos, Nereida; Puyuelo Ortiz, Estela (2006). La sombra del olvido II. Tradición oral en el Somontano occidental de Barbastro (in Spanish). Huesca: Instituto de Estudios Altoaragoneses. ISBN 84-8127-168-3.
- Puyol Ibort, Marta; Bolea Aguarón, Francisco (2025). La artesanía del boj en Sobrarbe (PDF) (in Spanish). Comarca de Sobrarbe.
