= Salto de Roldán =

Coordinates: 42°15′12″N 0°22′36″W

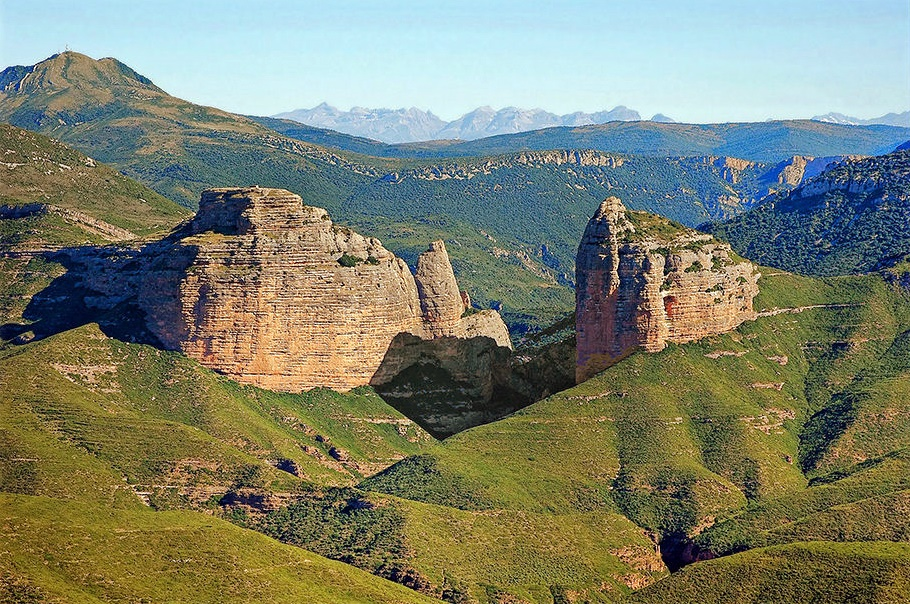
Salto de Roldán, from the south

Salto de Roldán (English: 'Roland's Leap') is a rock formation about 25 km (20 mi) north of Huesca in High Aragon, northern Spain, in the foothills of the central Pyrenees. It lies in the westernmost part of Sierra y Cañones de Guara Natural Park. It consists of several large outcrops of almost bare rock standing clear of the surrounding landscape.

== Description ==
Salto de Roldán includes two main rocky outcrops: Peña San Miguel (sometimes Sen; English: 'St Michael's Rock' or 'Crag'; 1,126 m (3,694 ft) or 1,123 m (3,684 ft)) to the west and Peña Amán (sometimes Men; etymology uncertain; 1,121 m (3,678 ft) or 1,124 m (3,688 ft)) to the east. Their exterior sides are sloped, and their facing sides are steep and stepped. They rise 250 metres (820 ft) or over 300 m (980 ft) from the surrounding landscape. (Note: The discrepancy can be explained by looking at photographs: the landscape is very irregular, and the height of the crags above it will depend on from where the estimate is made.) The distance from peak to peak is about 700 m (2,300 ft). There is a smaller isolated outcrop, El Fraile or Mallo d'o Fraile ('The Friar'; 1,036 m (3,399 ft) (Note: This height has been taken from the corresponding article in Catalan Wikipedia, and is unsourced.)), about 500 m (1,600 ft) northeast of Peña San Miguel. The river Flumen flows from north to south between El Fraile and Peña San Miguel to the west and Peña Amán to the east.

Salto de Roldán is what remains of a syncline (a U-shaped fold) of multiple strata of conglomerate limestone rock laid down in the Tertiary period which has been selectively eroded by riverwater. In northern Spain, this type of formation is called a mallo. Salto de Roldán was formed in two distinct phases. In the first, an ancient tributary of the Guatizalema cut a canyon about 450 m (1,480 ft) wide and 250 m (820 ft) deep through the rock. In the second, the Flumen cut into that canyon a gorge about 10 m (30 ft) wide and up to 50 m (160 ft) deep, called Palomeras del Flumen. (Note: Paloma is Spanish (and also occasionally Catalan) for dove. The name Palomeras may perhaps derive from a supposed resemblance of the gorge to a dovecote, or because doves lived there.)

French Pyrenean explorer, photographer and writer Lucien Briet (1860-1921) was in 1907 an early visitor to Salto de Roldán. The scene excited his imagination. Among other things, it suggested to him a temple to some pagan deity; perhaps Hercules, with the two Peñas representing the Pillars of Hercules. He said that the illustrations of French engraver Gustave Doré (1832-1883) to Dante's Inferno would have been better had he copied this landscape rather than being works of imagination. He thought that the post-Reconquista Christian sanctuary on Peña de San Miguel must have been built on the site of an earlier pagan temple.

Salto de Roldán is a visitor attraction, with foot access from a nearby road. It is possible to climb to the top of Peña San Miguel; though this involves negotiating two ladders made of metal staples driven into the rock, which are not for the faint of heart. On top, there are the ruins of a mediaeval fortress, of a cistern, and of a Romanesque-style hermitage of St Michael. The site is a protected monument. The view is spectacular.

Vegetation around Salto de Roldán includes flowers such as Pyrenean-violet, corona de rey, St. Anthony's turnip, farolito, (Note: There are several plants whose Spanish common name is farolito, and it is unclear which one this is.) and abejeta, (Note: Unidentified; abejeta is in neither Spanish Wikipedia nor Spanish Wiktionary. Possibly a local name for bee orchid (Spanish: orquídea abeja; abeja means 'bee').) aromatic herbs such as rosemary and thyme, trees such as box and kermes oak, and various orchids including yellow-fringed orchid and sombre bee-orchid.

A wide variety of bird species can be seen on and around Salto de Roldán. Insectivores include black redstart, African stonechat, leaf warbler and red-billed chough; swift, crag martin, house martin, wallcreeper, goldfinch, robin and blue tit. Birds of prey include griffon vulture, Egyptian vulture, short-toed eagle and booted eagle; and golden eagle, Bonelli's eagle, peregrine falcon and kestrel; and, as a rare visitor, bearded vulture (lammergeier or ossifrage). The eagles and vultures will use the thermals above the crags to gain height to sight prey; and in the case of the bearded vulture, to drop large animal bones onto rocks to break them open so that they can feed on the marrow.

== History ==
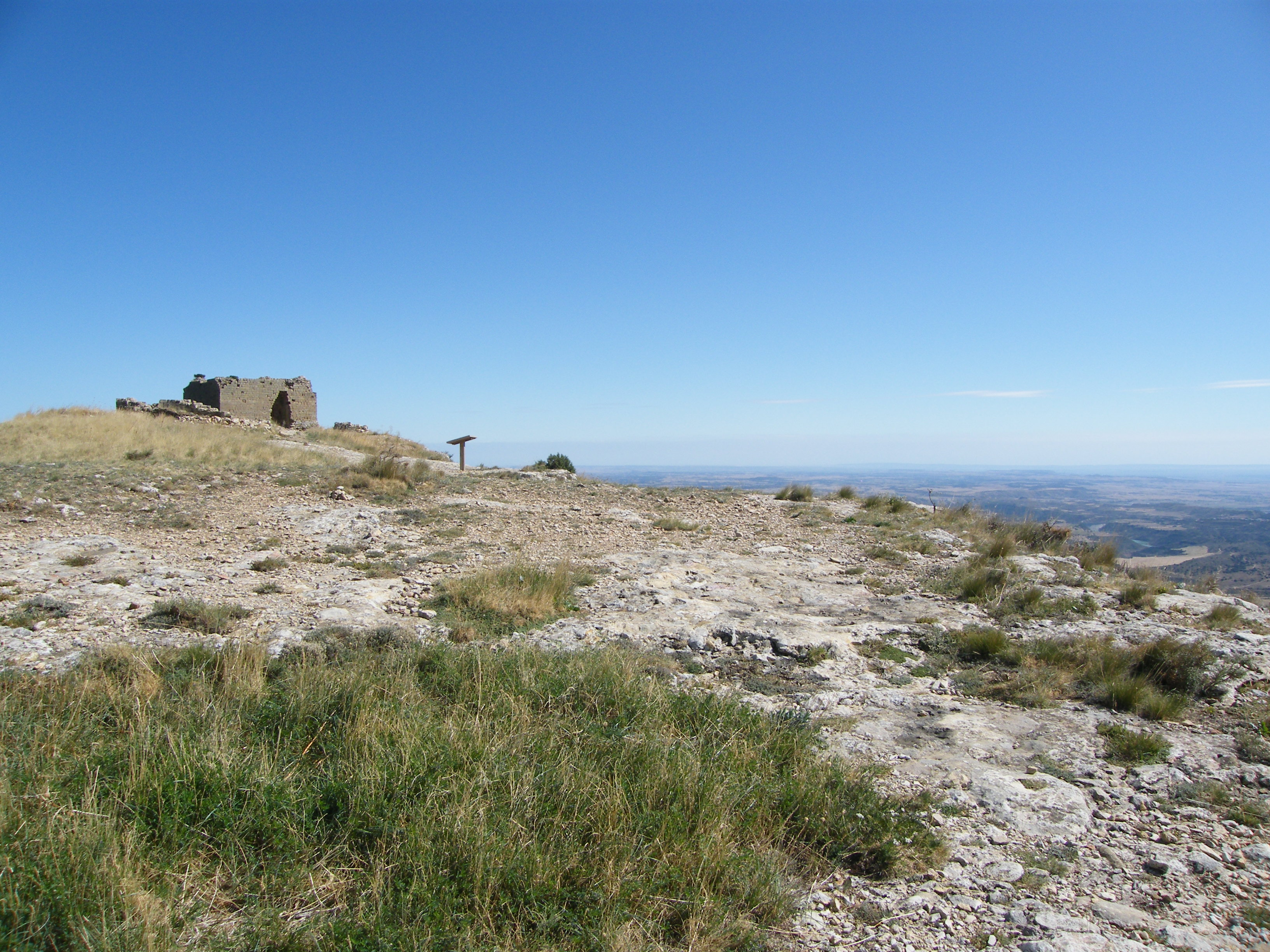
The ruins of the Fortress of Sen

There is evidence of prehistoric occupation close by. Near the village of Santa Eulalia de la Peña is the cave shelter of La Raja (which is not easily accessible because the path is heavily overgrown). It contains a cave painting which depicts a figure of Levantine type surrounded by bovids, deer and goats, which several experts consider the westernmost outpost of Levantine art. It has been suggested that prehistoric man made summer hunting camps near the Salto de Roldán. Also close by, there is a dolmen (megalithic tomb) at Belsué.

There was a Roman settlement (known as Bajo Cuesta) by the modern village of Apiés. There is evidence of Visigothic presence from a belt plate discovered at the village of Sabayés. After the Muslim conquest of Spain, Huesca became part of the Caliphate of Cordoba, and Salto de Roldán was fortified. It was a strategic site, because it controlled access to the valley and plains of the River Ebro to the south. In 941, García Sánchez I of Pamplona captured the Fortress of Sen (es, eu). In 942, Muhammad ibn Hashim al-Tujibi, lord of Zaragoza, retook it; a victory which was celebrated in the Mosque of Córdoba. In 1086, Christian forces finally took and retained it.

== Legends ==
There are several legends associated with the site.

In the main legend, Roland (Spanish: Roldán), the foremost of Charlemagne's paladins, was being hotly pursued by Saracens, the Muslim Arab occupiers of Spain. Cornered at Salto de Roldán, he escaped by leaping on horseback from one of the crags to the other. There are, however, differences in detail. The leap was in an unspecified direction; or was from Peña de Amán to Peña de San Miguel; or was from Peña de San Miguel to Peña de Amán. In some accounts, the horse landed with such force that it left the imprints of its hooves in the rock. The horse sometimes died as a result; or, was slain in mid-leap by a sorcerer. In some accounts, Roland continued northward on foot, and smote the Pyrenees with his sword to create Roland's Breach, so that he could see France one last time before he died.

(According to the scanty historical record, Roland died in 778 commanding the rearguard of Charlemagne's army at the Battle of Roncesvalles, about 110 km (70 mi) to the northwest. That battle, and Roland, became the subjects of other mediaeval legends.)

Modern Coat of Arms of Huesca

There are several other legends, which do not involve Roland at all. In one of those, St Martin leapt from one of the rocks to the nearby Hermitage of St Martin of Bal d'Onsera to escape persecution. In another, St Martin and St Michael were on the top of Peña de San Miguel, mounted on a horse and an ox respectively. Only St Martin was able to make the leap; which is why that crag is named after St Michael, who had had to stay behind. In another, the Devil himself, riding an infernal horse, leapt the chasm. A legend of a different kind altogether has a gigantic spider squatting to span the crags and spinning her silk down into the abyss.

In more recent times, Salto de Roldán was said to have been a meeting-place for witches called almetas. During winter nights, especially on Fridays, or on Easter Day, they would fly to Peña de San Miguel to prepare their misdeeds; and men would try to shoot them out of the air using shotguns loaded with wax pellets which had been blessed by a priest. In still another legend, Patetas (a local name for the Devil) would pass by on stormy nights, leaving smouldering footprints behind him.

Both the modern Coat of Arms of Huesca (es) (which date from the 16th century) and its mediaeval predecessor (from the 13th) include at their top the device of a block having a V-shaped notch. It is commonly said that it symbolises Salto de Roldán. (Note: The idea is not impossible. Fox-Davies' Complete Guide to Heraldry (1909) includes no example of any heraldic charge like it.) Some writers have suggested that the official Spanish name of Huesca (Catalan: Osca) derives from a Latin, Basque and Catalan word osca, meaning notch or indentation, referring to the Salto de Roldán.

== Gallery ==
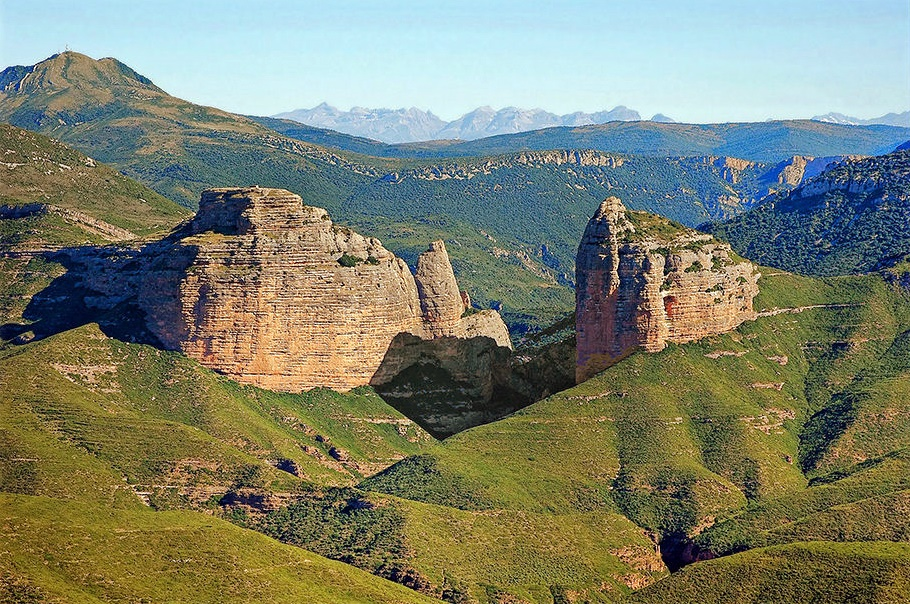

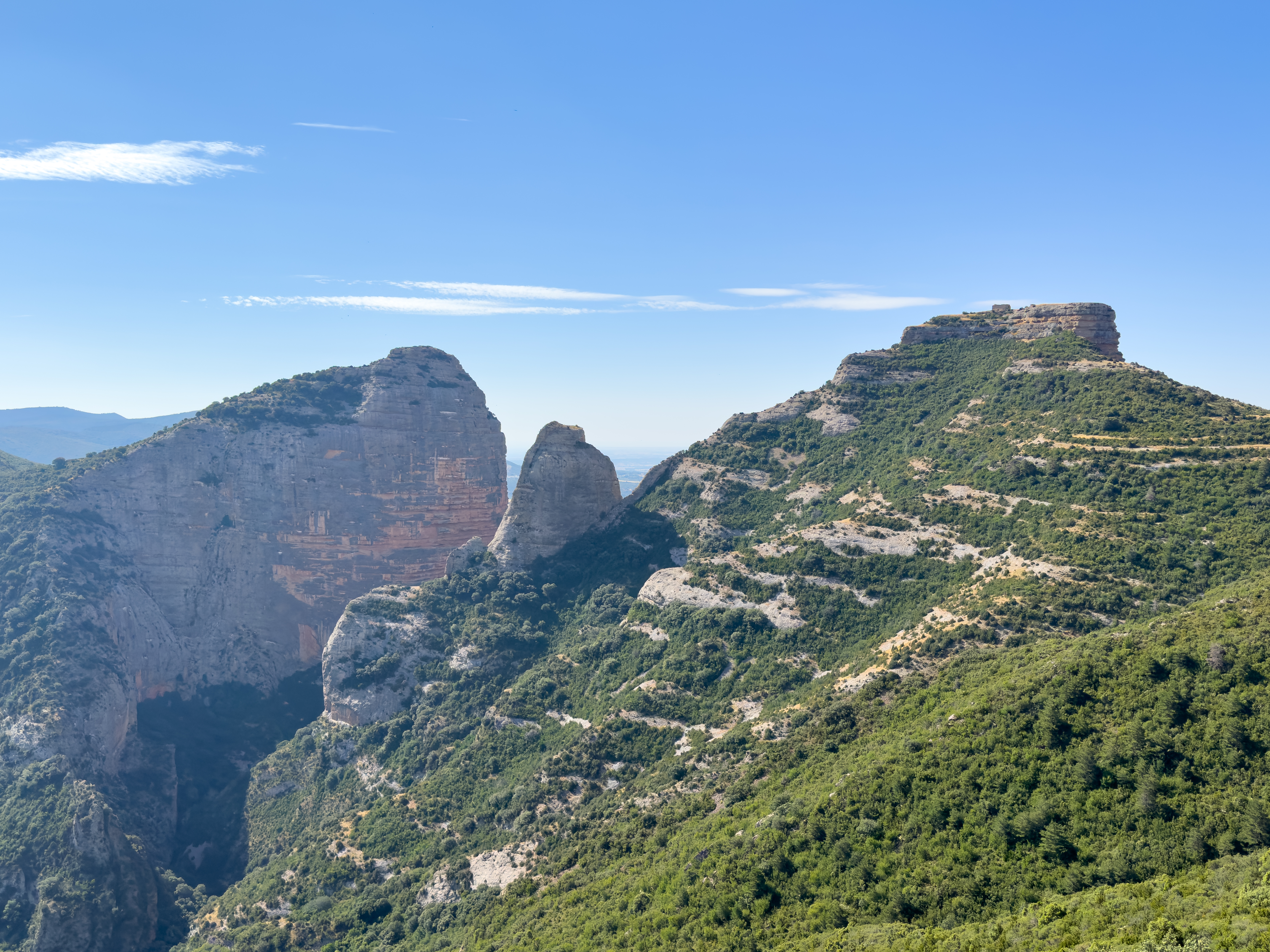

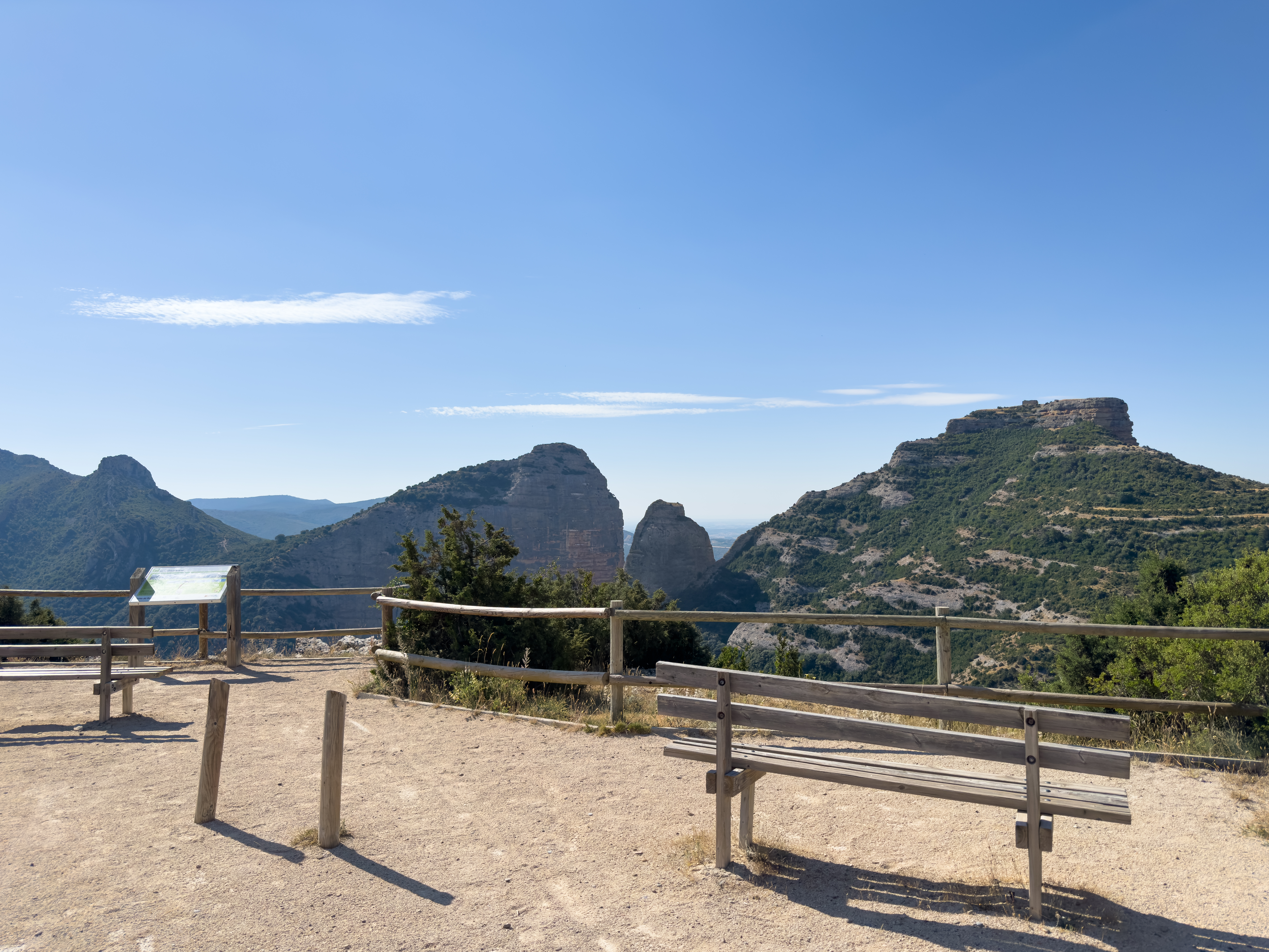
