= Dolmen Losa de la Mora =

Megalithic burial mound in Aragón, Spain

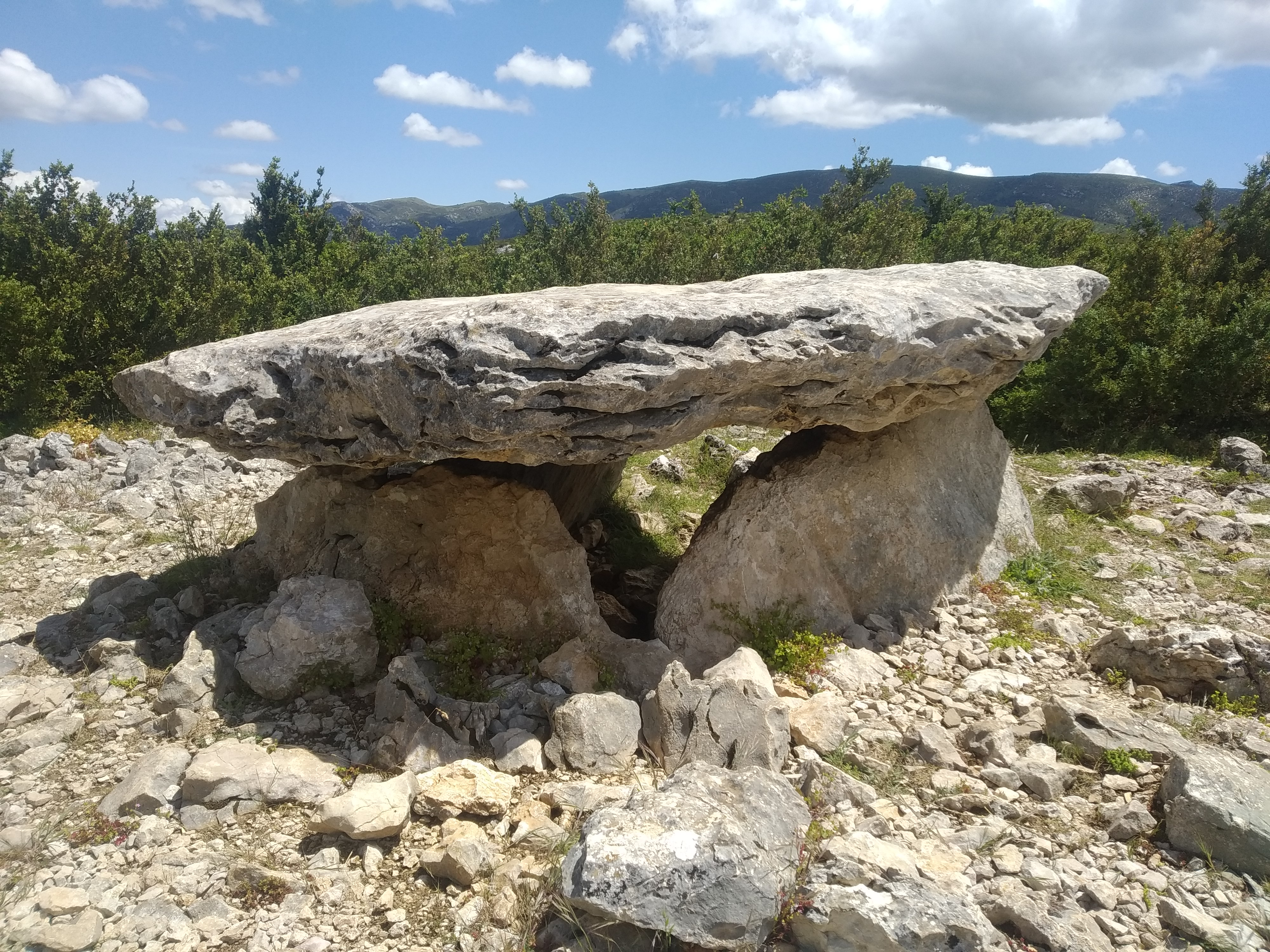
- The dolmen in 2021
- Interactive map of Dolmen Losa de la Mora
- 42.30568°N 0.08911°W
- Type: Dolmen
- Location: Aragon, Spain

History
- Built: c. 3000 BC

Site notes
- Material: Stone

The Dolmen Losa de la Mora or of Rodellar is a well-preserved dolmen located in Rodellar, in the municipality of Bierge, in the Sierra de Guara (Huesca, Spain). It is at an altitude of 1,020 masl.

It dates from Neolithic, from around 3000 BC. It consists of three orthostats covered by a large slab, which gives the dolmen its name. The rocks that form it come from the Tozal de Llastras, a place located about 500 m. far. The dolmen is surrounded by numerous stones belonging to the mound that covered it, with a diameter of dispersion of about 12 meters. It was excavated by the archaeologist Martín Almagro Basch in 1935 and 1936, finding stone axes, flint tools, and skeletal remains of various individuals.

== Access ==
The dolmen is on a mountain pass next to a signposted path that starts from Rodellar and leads to the uninhabited towns of Otín and Nasarre.
