= Morrano =

- Location within Spain
- Coordinates: 42°11′53″N 0°6′23″W
- Country: Spain
- Autonomous Community: Aragon
- Province: Huesca
- Comarcas of Aragon: Somontano de Barbastro
- Municipality: Bierge
- Elevation: 640 m (2,100 ft)

Population (2010)
  - Total: 46
- Demonym(s): Morranense, falconero timezone = CET
- Time zone: UTC+1
  - Summer (DST): UTC+2 (CEST)
- Postcode: 22141
- Website: City hall of Bierge

Morrano is a village in the municipality of Bierge, in the northwest comarca of Somontano de Barbastro in province of Huesca, Aragon, Spain. According to the 2010 census (INE), the municipality has a population of 46 inhabitants.

== Geography ==
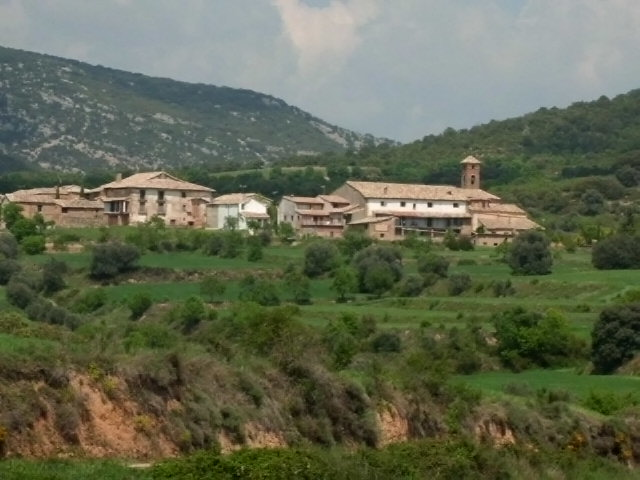
View of the village.

Morrano is in pre-Pyrenees, 640 meters high. The Alcandre River and a pine forest border the village. The municipal is also home to the Sierra y Cañones de Guara Natural Park.

The vegetation mostly consists of olive, the almond, the juniper and holm oak.

== History ==
In 1097 Peter, Bishop of Huesca, gave the monastery of S. Ponce de Turners Labatella churches, Morrano, Yaso and Panzano. In 1213 is villa. In 1887 had 78 homes.

== Monuments ==
- Parish Church dedicated to St. Peter the Apostle, has romanesque art origin but with several reforms in the 17th and 18th century.
- City hall (year 1733)
- Future museum dedicated to birds.
- Hermitage of San Martín
- The egg of Morrano or the "Peña Falconera", is a geological formation.

== Demographics ==
Historical population
Year	1877	1900	1950	1981	2001	2004	2006	2008	2010
Pop.	416	358	228	96	51	48	48	47	46
±%	—	−13.9%	−36.3%	−57.9%	−46.9%	−5.9%	+0.0%	−2.1%	−2.1%

== Sport ==
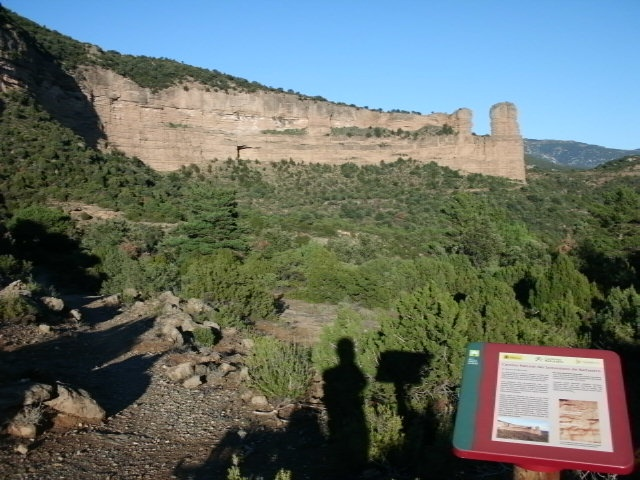
The egg of Morrano or the "Peña Falconera.

Around the village can practice canyoning and hiking.

== See also ==
- Sierra y Cañones de Guara Natural Park
- Peña Falconera
