= Peña Falconera =

Peña Falconera Huevo de Morrano
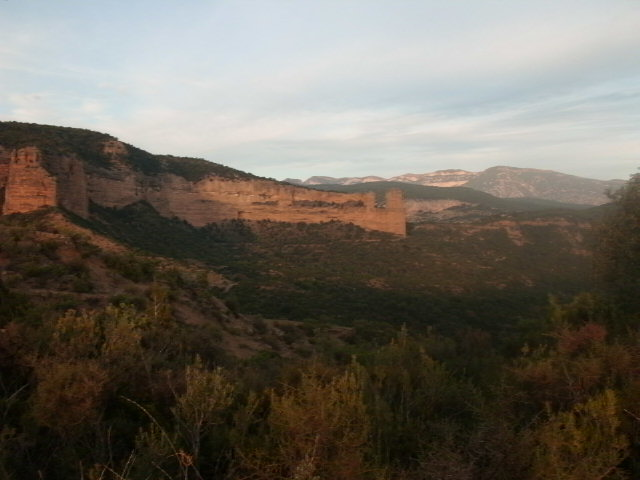
- Peña Falconera and the Sierra de Sevil

Highest point
- Elevation: 766 m (2,513 ft)
- Coordinates: 42°12′10″N 0°06′14″W

Geography
- Location within Spain
- Location: Huesca Province, Aragon
- Parent range: Pre-Pyrenees

Geology
- Mountain type: Conglomerate

Climbing
- First ascent: March of 1960
- Easiest route: From Morrano

The Peña Falconera or Huevo de Morrano (Morrano egg) is a rock formation near the village of Morrano, northwest of Somontano de Barbastro, Province of Huesca.

This rock formation is composed of a monolith with a mixture of sand and conglomerate somewhat eroded. It is located in the Parque de la Sierra y Cañones de Guara, a few meters from the river Alcanadre and close to the "fountain de la Tamara", is also near the pine forest of Morrano where pine are that are the most southerly of all the natural park and the Alto Aragon too.

== Name ==
The inhabitants of Morrano have always called the formation "Peña Falconera" because according to tradition in this area falcons were bred, and "falcon" is the word's translation into the Aragonese language. Today the nickname "Falconero" is still used by the inhabitants of Morrano. A few years ago the stone was given a new name with the creation of the natural park. This name, "Huevo de Morrano" (Morrano egg), was created by a forester. In Spanish, the name is "Alconera Peña," although that version is used much less frequently. The name "Peña los Pacos" is also used.

== See also ==
- Morrano
