= Sierra y Cañones de Guara Natural Park =

Natural park in Huesca, Aragon, Spain

- IUCN category V (protected landscape/seascape)
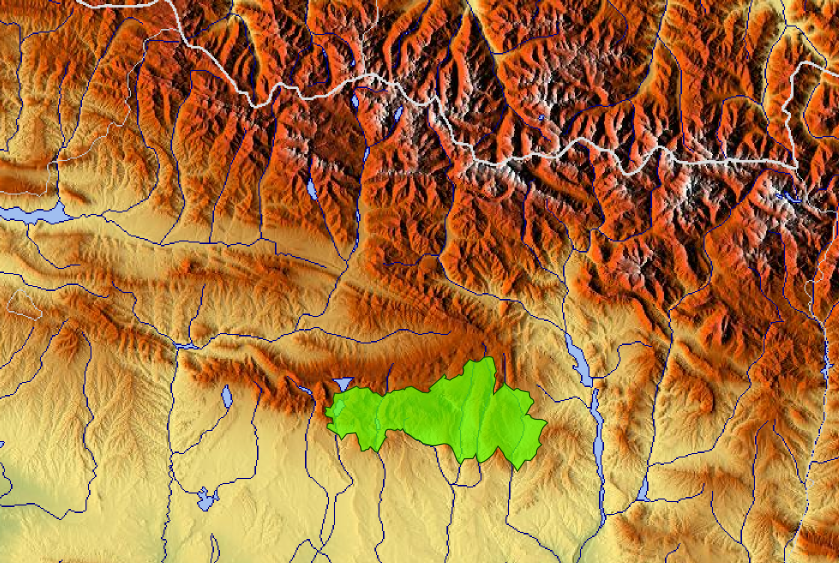
- Natural Park boundaries in the province of Huesca
- Interactive map of Sierra y Cañones de Guara Natural Park
- Location: Center of the Huesca province
- Coordinates: 42°16′26″N 0°12′4″E
- Area: 474.50 km^{2} (183.21 sq mi)
- Established: 1990
- Visitors: 109.132 (in 2009)
- Governing body: Gouvernement of Aragón.

The Sierra y Cañones de Guara Natural Park (Spanish: Parque natural de la Sierra y los Cañones de Guara) is a Spanish Natural park in the Sierra de Guara mountain range, located in the Province of Huesca, Aragon, northern Spain. It was established in 1990.

== Geography ==
The nature park covers an area of about 47,450 hectares, not including a peripheral zone of protection that also covers 33,775 hectares.

The park covers the Spanish municipalities of:
Abiego, Adahuesca, Aínsa-Sobrarbe, Alquézar, Arguis, Bárcabo, Bierge, Boltaña, Caldearenas, Casbas de Huesca, Colungo, Huesca, Loporzano, Nueno and Sabiñánigo.

The altitude of the park ranges from 430 metres (1,410 ft) at the Alcanadre River to 2,077 metres (6,814 ft) at the summit of Tozal of Guara.

Salto de Roldán ('Roland's Leap'), a natural rock formation, lies in the westernmost part of the park. Several legends are associated with it; mainly relating to Roland (Spanish: Roldán), the foremost of Charlemagne's paladins.
