= Abiego =

- Municipality
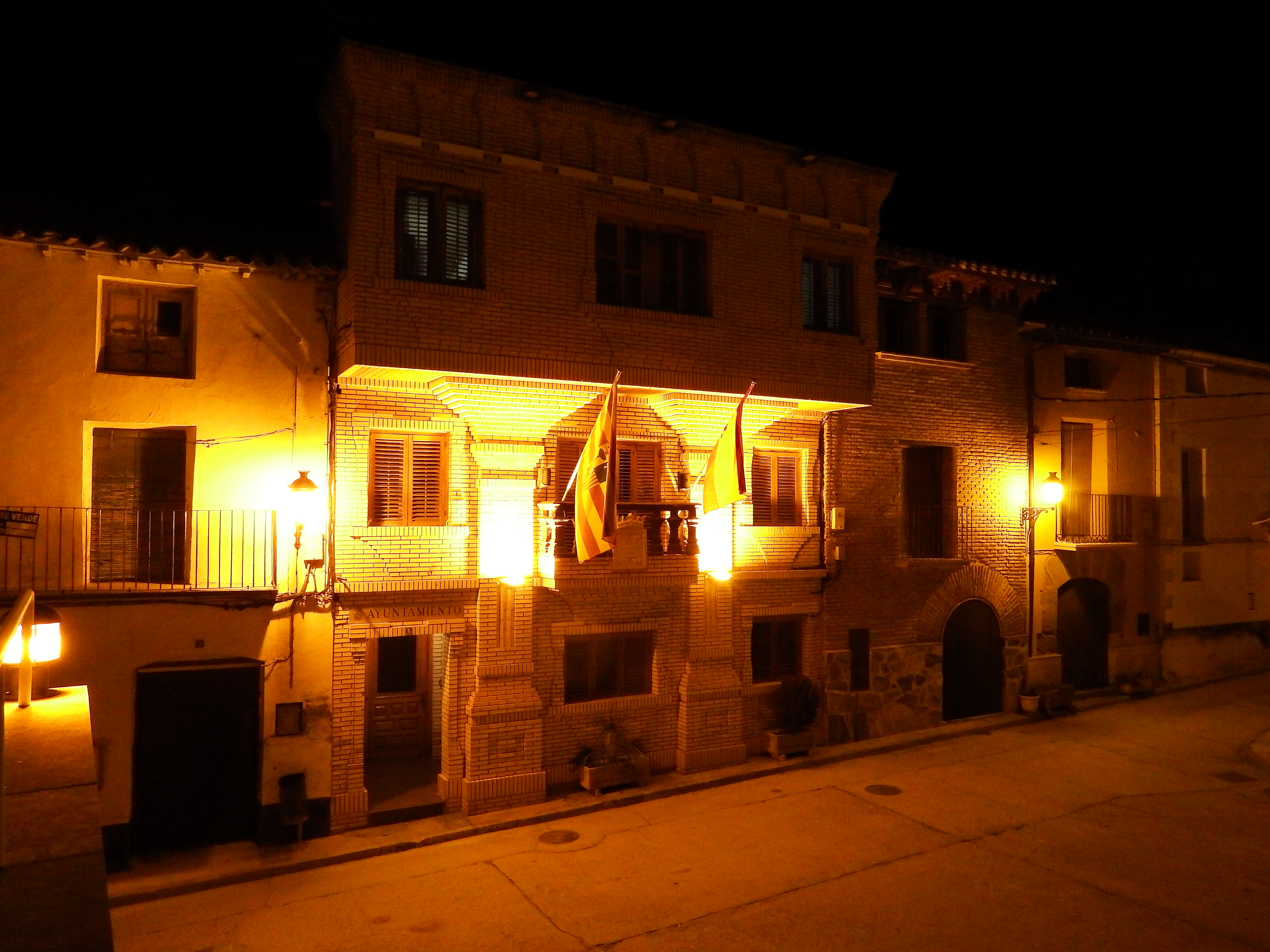
- Town hall

- Coat of arms

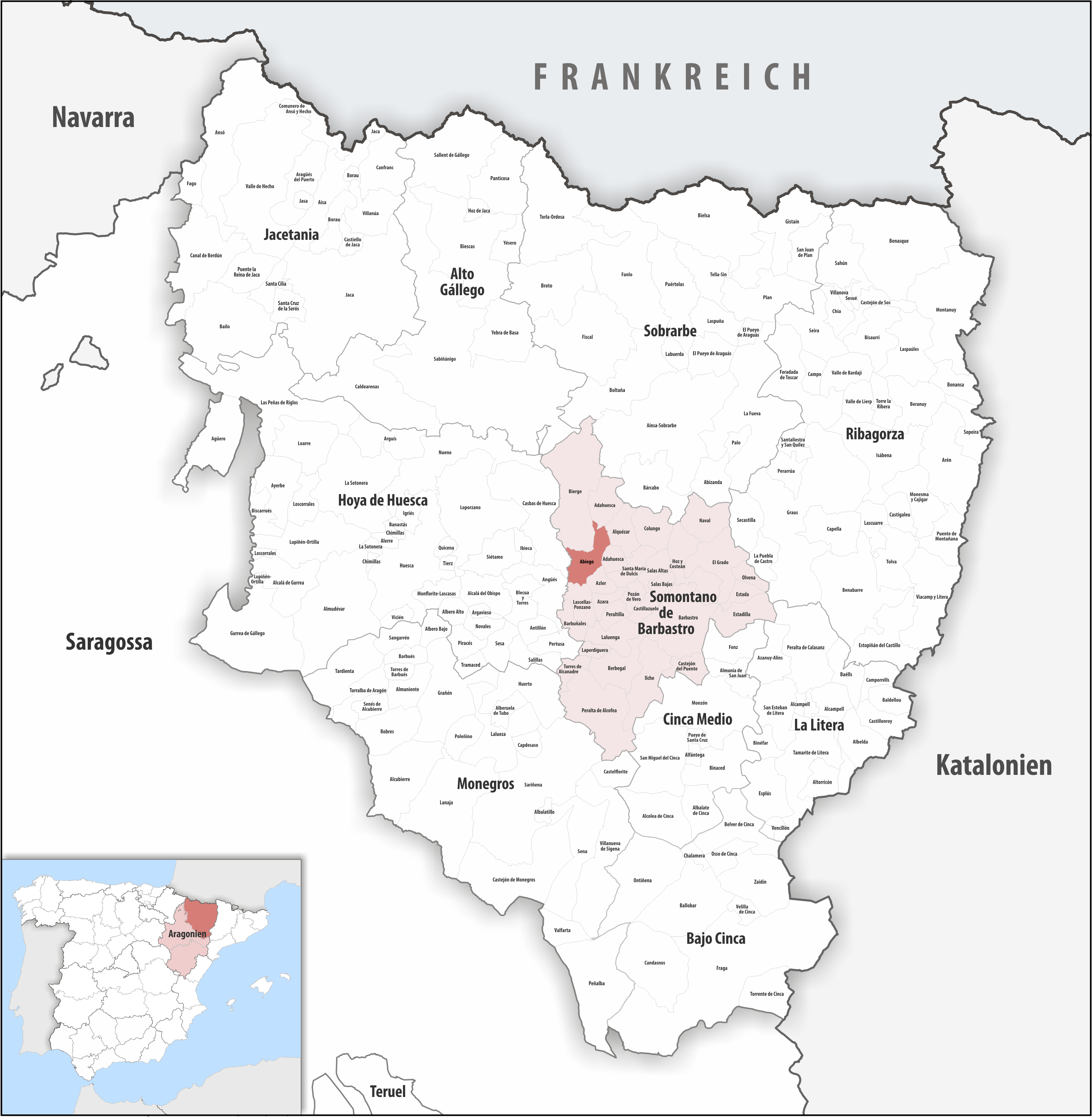
- Municipal location within the Comarca of Somontano de Barbastro and Province of Huesca.

- Location within Spain
- Coordinates: 42°07′N 0°04′W
- Country: Spain
- Autonomous community: Aragon
- Province: Huesca
- Comarca: Somontano de Barbastro

Population (2025-01-01)
  - Total: 259

Abiego is a municipality in the province of Huesca, in the autonomous community of Aragon, Spain. In 2018, it had a population of 237.

Approaching Abiego along the road from Bierge, there is a well-preserved collection of in-situ fossil footprints dating from the late-Oligocene epoch (25 million years BP).

== See also ==
- List of municipalities in Huesca
