= Cinca (Spain) =

River in Spain

Coordinates: 42°3′13.28″N 0°11′46.82″E

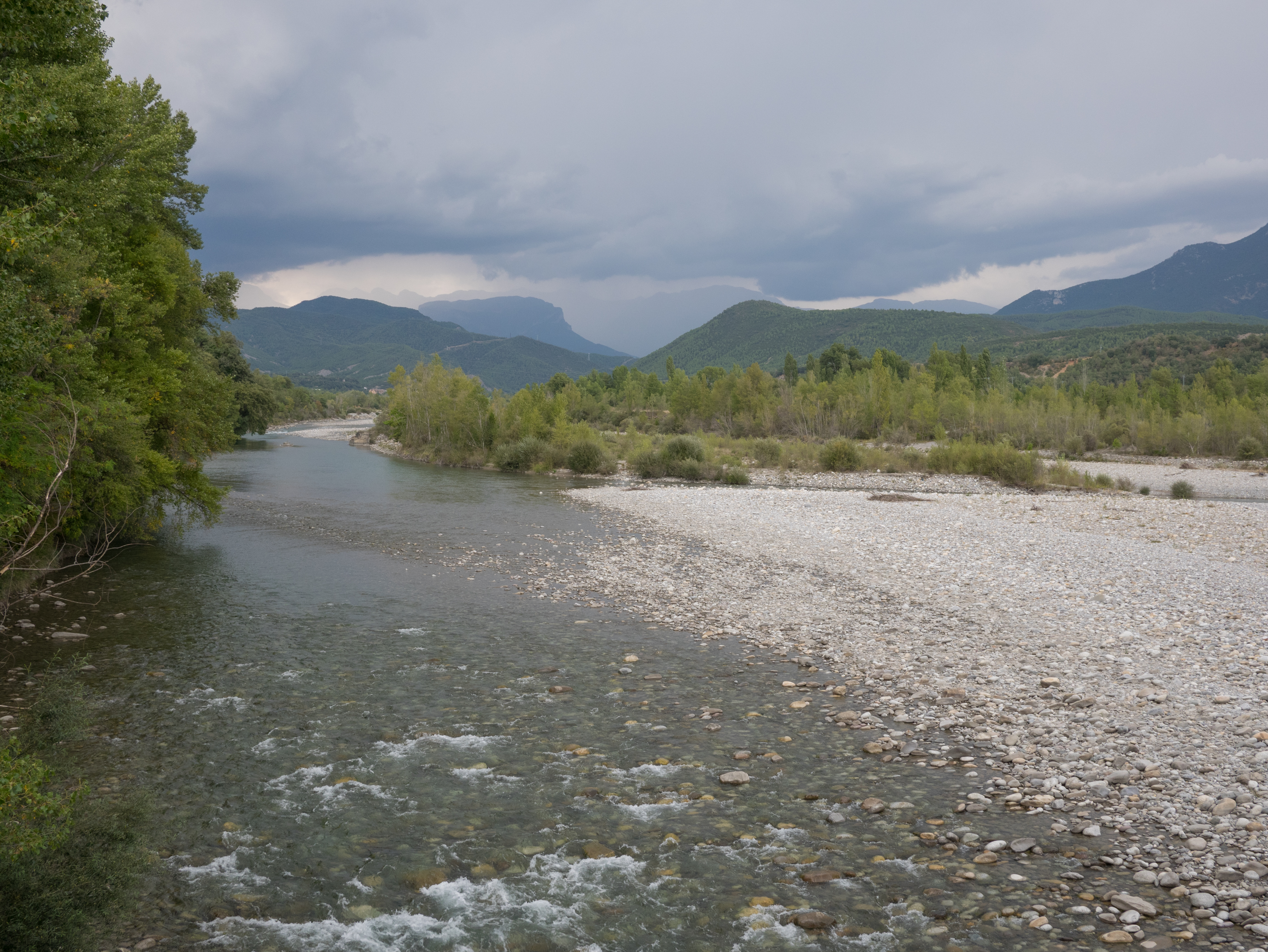
- Cinca river at Aínsa

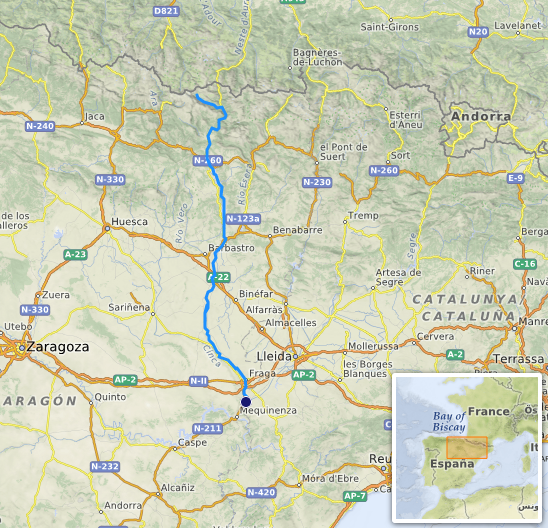

Location
- Country: Spain

Physical characteristics
- Source
  - elevation: 2,500 m (8,200 ft)
- Mouth
  - location: Segre River
- Length: 170 km (110 mi)

Basin features
- Progression: Segre→ Ebro→ Balearic Sea

The Cinca (Spanish: [ˈθiŋka]; Catalan: [ˈsiŋkə]; Aragonese: A Cinca, Aragonese pronunciation: [a ˈθiŋka]) is a river in Aragon, Spain. Its source is in the Circo de Pineta, in the Ordesa y Monte Perdido National Park, in the Aragonese Pyrenees. It is a tributary to the Segre River, with its confluence at La Granja d'Escarp, not far from the point where the Segre flows into the Ebro River. The Cinca River flows through a rich agricultural region.

== Path and tributaries ==
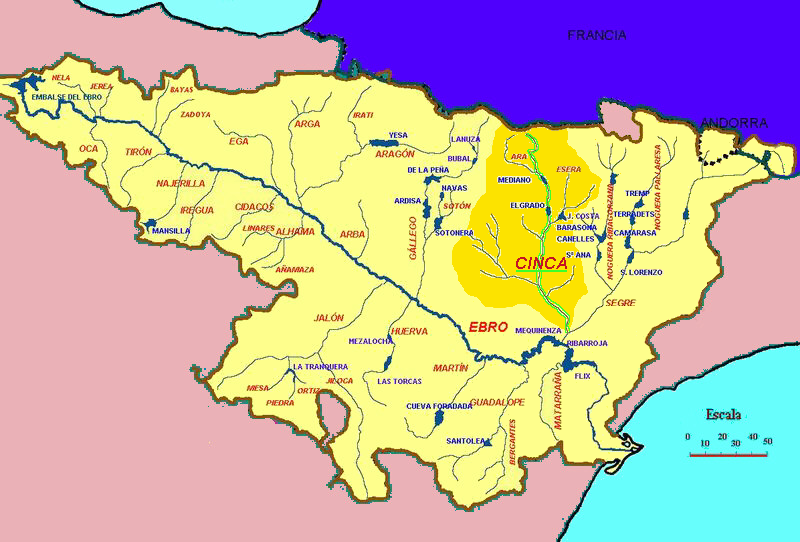
Map of the course of the Cinca

The Cinca is born in the area of Pineta and begins its descent between cascades and torrents, in the mountains of the Tres Sorores. It flows across the entire Pineta valley. In Bielsa, it joins with the Barrosa, and somewhat later the Cinqueta. Upon reaching Aínsa, it is joined on the right side by the Ara River, where the Mediano Reservoir is located. Immediately after the Mediano, after crossing the throat of the Entremón, it is again dammed at the El Grado Reservoir near El Grado. Just after this, it is joined on the left side by the Ésera River, the Cinca's most important tributary.

On the right side, it is joined by the Vero River, and in Monzón by the Sosa River on the left. Later, the Alcanadre pours into it on the right. Finally, in Massalcoreig, it joins the Segre to flow into the Ebro River.

== History ==
The presence of humans is not found in the upper stretches of the river, but only in the middle stretches, although it is known from ancient accounts.

The migratory villages, in the first Iron Age, used the Cinca Valley in their path to the interior; they were populated by the Ilergetes. The current name of the river comes from Cinga, because Julius Caesar in his account of the civil war, used that name. It underwent a change of name under the Moors because it came to have the name Az-Zaytum, which meant the River of Olives.

== See also ==
- Cinca Medio
- Baix Cinca
- List of rivers of Spain
