= Sierra de Guara =

Mountain range in Huesca, Spain

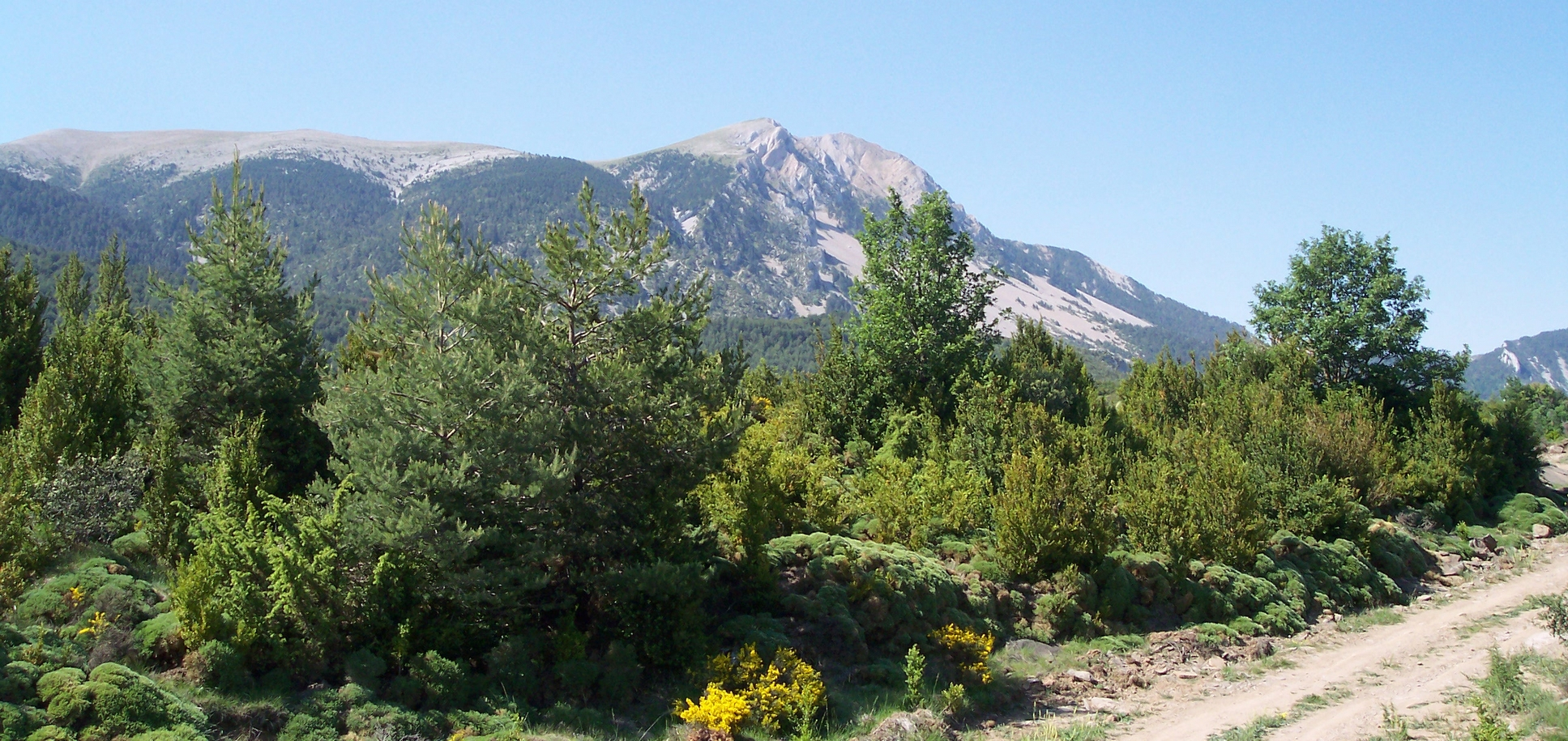

Highest point
- Peak: Tozal de Guara
- Elevation: 2,077 m (6,814 ft)
- Coordinates: 42°17′19″N 00°13′46″W

Geography
- Location within Pyrenees
- Location: Alto Gállego, Hoya de Huesca, Aragon
- Parent range: Pre-Pyrenees

Geology
- Formed by: Limestone

The Sierra de Guara is a mountain massif in the province of Huesca, the most northerly province in the autonomous community of Aragon, Spain. Its highest point is Tozal de Guara (2,077 m).

It lies around 25 km northeast of the city of Huesca itself. Much of the massif is now included within the Sierra y Cañones de Guara Natural Park which extends 43 km from west to east and 25 km north to south. The Park includes, in addition to the Sierra de Guara itself, much of the Sierra de Gabardiella in the west and the Sierra de Arangol, Sierra de Balced, Sierra de Sebil and Sierra de Rufás in the east.

== Landscape features ==
A number of rivers flow north-south through the area, the principal ones having their sources to the north of the massif and cut through the range by way of spectacular gorges such as those of the Rio Alcanadre, Rio Guatizalema, Rio Vero and Rio Isuala. Each of these rivers ultimately drain into the Ebro.

== Geology ==
The massif is formed mainly from Palaeogene limestone and, on its southern edge, an overlying coarse sandstone of the Miocene age which is largely made up of conglomeratic rock.

== Towns and villages ==
The area is sparsely populated with a number of abandoned villages within its interior. The villages of Alquézar and Rodellar have been reinvigorated in recent years by tourist development. To the northeast, outside of the natural park, lies the historic city of Ainsa and to the south lies Barbastro.

== Sport and recreation ==
The area has become known in recent years for its considerable opportunities for canyoning due to its many gorges. Rock climbing and caving are also popular activities whilst others enjoy walking and wildlife-watching. In particular, the climbing area of Rodellar, named after the nearby village, has become one of the most famous climbing areas in Europe.

== See also ==
- Pre-Pyrenees
