= Arascués =

Coordinates: 42.2444°N 0.4628°W

- Interactive map of Arascués
- Country: Spain
- Province: Huesca
- Municipality: Nueno
- Elevation: 673 m (2,208 ft)

Population (2014)
  - Total: 82

Arascués is a village under the local government of the municipality of Nueno, Hoya de Huesca, Huesca, Aragon, Spain.
