= El Grado =

El Grado Lo Grau
- municipality
- Coat of arms

- Location in Spain
- Coordinates: 42°9′5″N 0°13′23″E
- Country: Spain
- Autonomous community: Aragon
- Province: Huesca
- Comarca: Somontano de Barbastro

Government
  - Mayor: Joaquín Paricio Casado

Area
  - Total: 63.77 km^{2} (24.62 sq mi)
- Elevation: 467 m (1,532 ft)

Population (2025-01-01)
  - Total: 383
  - Density: 6.01/km^{2} (15.6/sq mi)
- Demonym: Gradenses
- Time zone: UTC+1 (CET)
  - Summer (DST): UTC+2 (CEST)

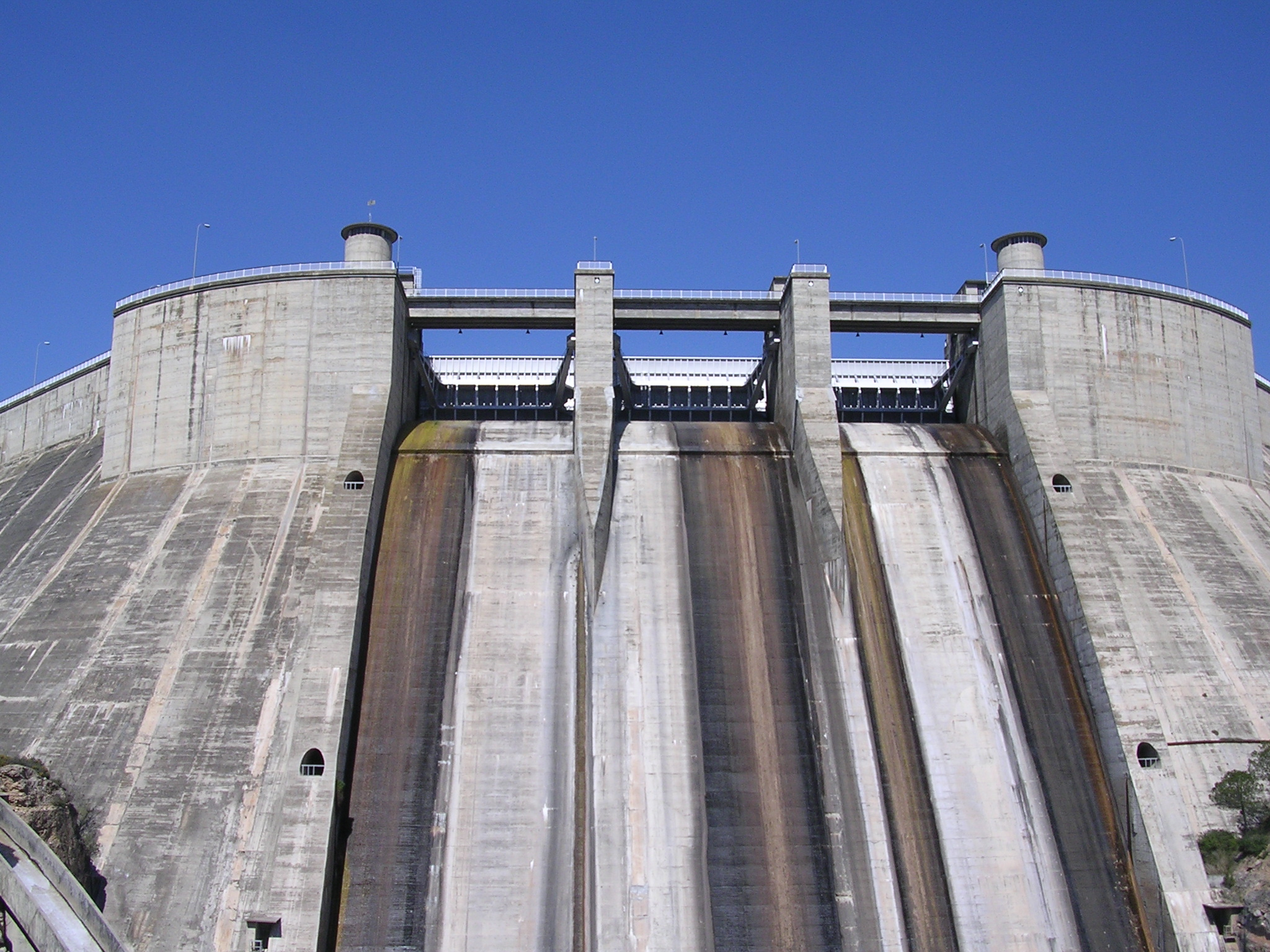
Dam of El Grado reservoir

El Grado (Aragonese Lo Grau) is a municipality located in the province of Huesca, Aragon, Spain. According to 2009 data (INE), the municipality has a population of 506 inhabitants.

There is a large reservoir, managing the waters of river Cinca in this town's municipal term.

== See also ==
- List of municipalities in Huesca
