= San Román (Huesca) =

- Locality
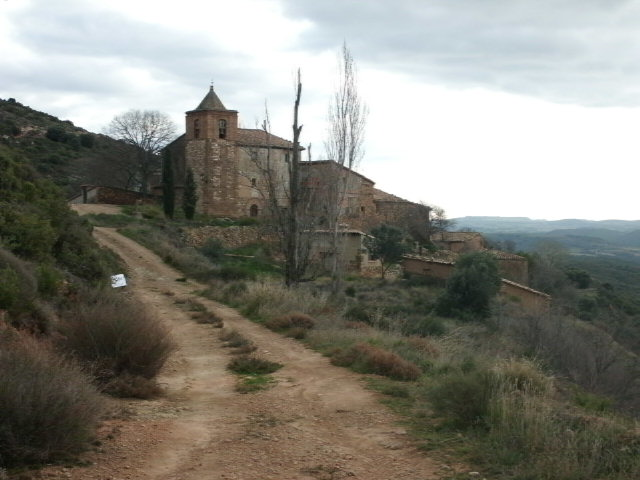

- Location within Aragon Location within Spain
- Coordinates: 42°10′31″N 0°6′59″W
- Country: Spain
- Autonomous community: Aragon
- Province: Province of Huesca
- Municipality: Bierge

Population
  - Total: 5

San Román is a locality located in the municipality of Bierge, in Huesca province, Aragon, Spain. As of 2020, it has a population of 5.

== Geography ==
San Román is located 52km east-northeast of Huesca.
