= Yaso (Huesca) =

- Locality
- Location within Aragon Location within Spain
- Coordinates: 42°12′8″N 0°7′44″W
- Country: Spain
- Autonomous community: Aragon
- Province: Province of Huesca
- Municipality: Bierge
- Elevation: 689 m (2,260 ft)

Population
  - Total: 14

Yaso is a locality located in the municipality of Bierge, in Huesca province, Aragon, Spain. As of 2020, it has a population of 14.

== Geography ==
Yaso is located 43km east-northeast of Huesca.
