= Alquézar =

Alquézar Alquezra
- Municipality
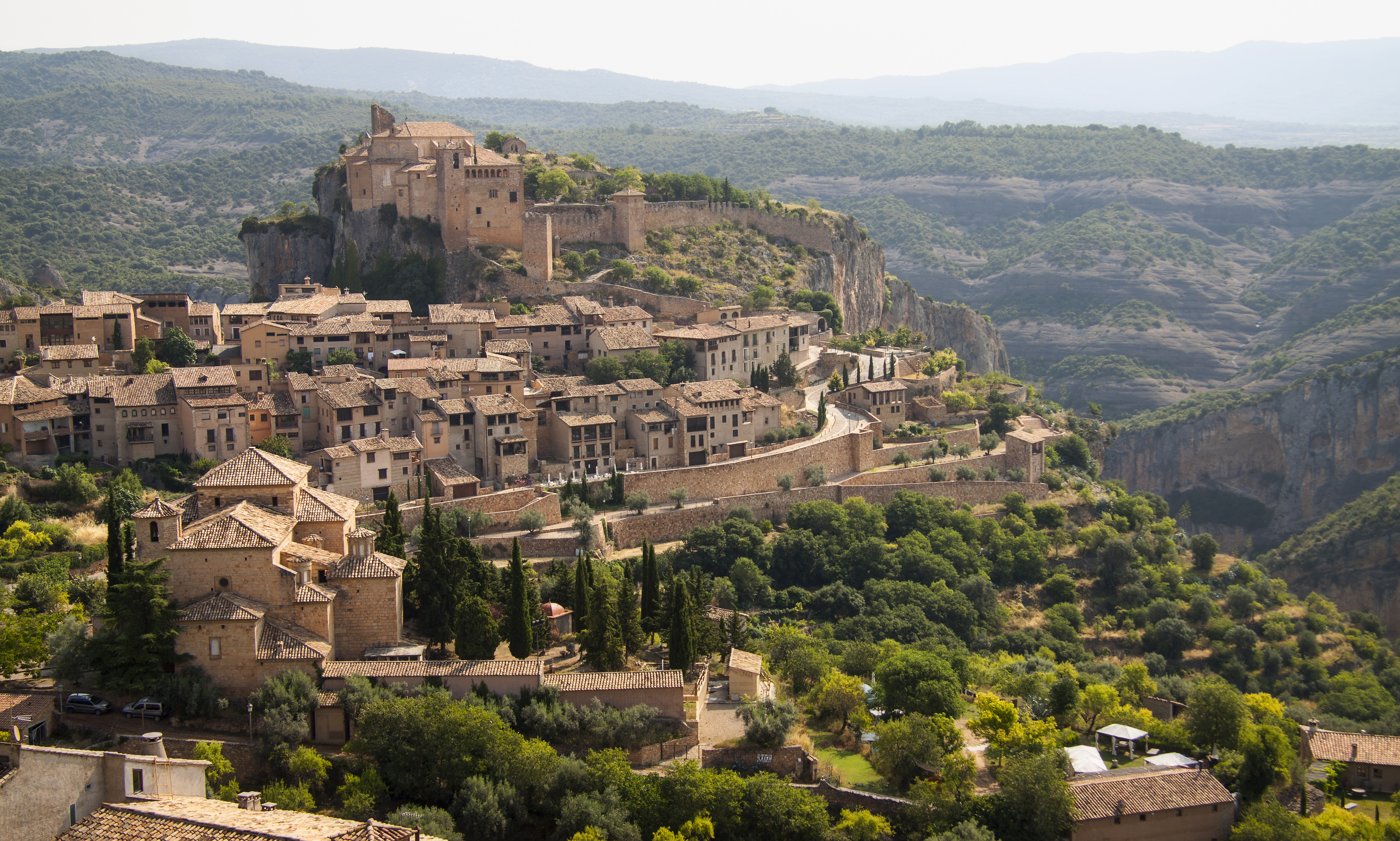
- View of Alquézar with the collegiate church on top

- Coat of arms

- Location in Spain
- Coordinates: 42°10′26″N 0°01′38″W
- Country: Spain
- Autonomous community: Aragon
- Province: Huesca
- Comarca: Somontano de Barbastro
- Judicial district: Barbastro

Government
  - Type: Mayor-council
  - Mayor: José Mariano Altemir Lascorz (PSOE-Aragón)

Area
  - Total: 32.36 km^{2} (12.49 sq mi)
- Elevation: 660 m (2,170 ft)

Population (2025-01-01)
  - Total: 328
  - Density: 10.1/km^{2} (26.3/sq mi)
- Demonym: Alquezrano/a
- Time zone: UTC+1 (CET)
  - Summer (DST): UTC+2 (CEST)
- Postal code: 22145
- Website: www.alquezar.org

Spanish Cultural Heritage
- Type: Non-movable
- Criteria: Historic ensemble
- Designated: 26 February 1982
- Reference no.: RI-53-0000253

Alquézar (Aragonese: Alquezra) is a municipality in the province of Huesca, in the autonomous community of Aragon, Spain. As of 2012, its population was 301.

== Overview ==
Situated on a limestone outcrop of the Eocene age to the west of the canyon of the Rio Vero in the Sierra y Cañones de Guara Natural Park, the village grew up around a castle and the Collegiate church of Santa Maria, which was consecrated in 1099.

The name of the village comes from the Arabic القصر al qaçr for "fort" or "castle" (renamed as Alcazar in Spanish). The castle became the main defense point of the nearby city of Barbastro.

Since Alquézar is situated in the Sierra y Cañones de Guara Natural Park, there are various campsites in the local area to cater to outdoor enthusiasts. Popular activities include canyoning, walking, rock climbing and abseiling, as well as ornithology (since vultures nest on the steep faces of the Rio Vero canyon).

The surrounding area to the south towards Barbastro, in the direction of the flatter Ebro basin, is part of the Somontano, an area known for its fine wines. There are more than 60 limestone caves with prehistoric cave paintings in the surrounding area, which has led to the region being declared a World Heritage Site by UNESCO in 1998. A good example is the cave at Arpán on the A-2205 road heading north towards Bárcabo.

== Gallery ==
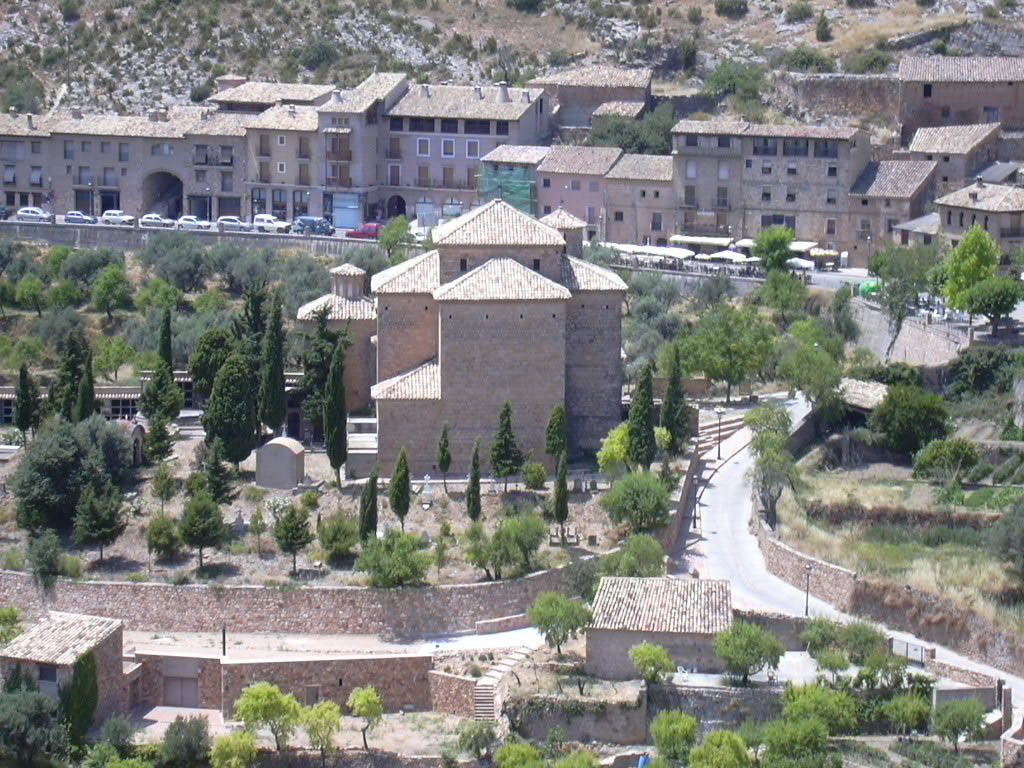
View of Saint Michael's church from the Collegiate church

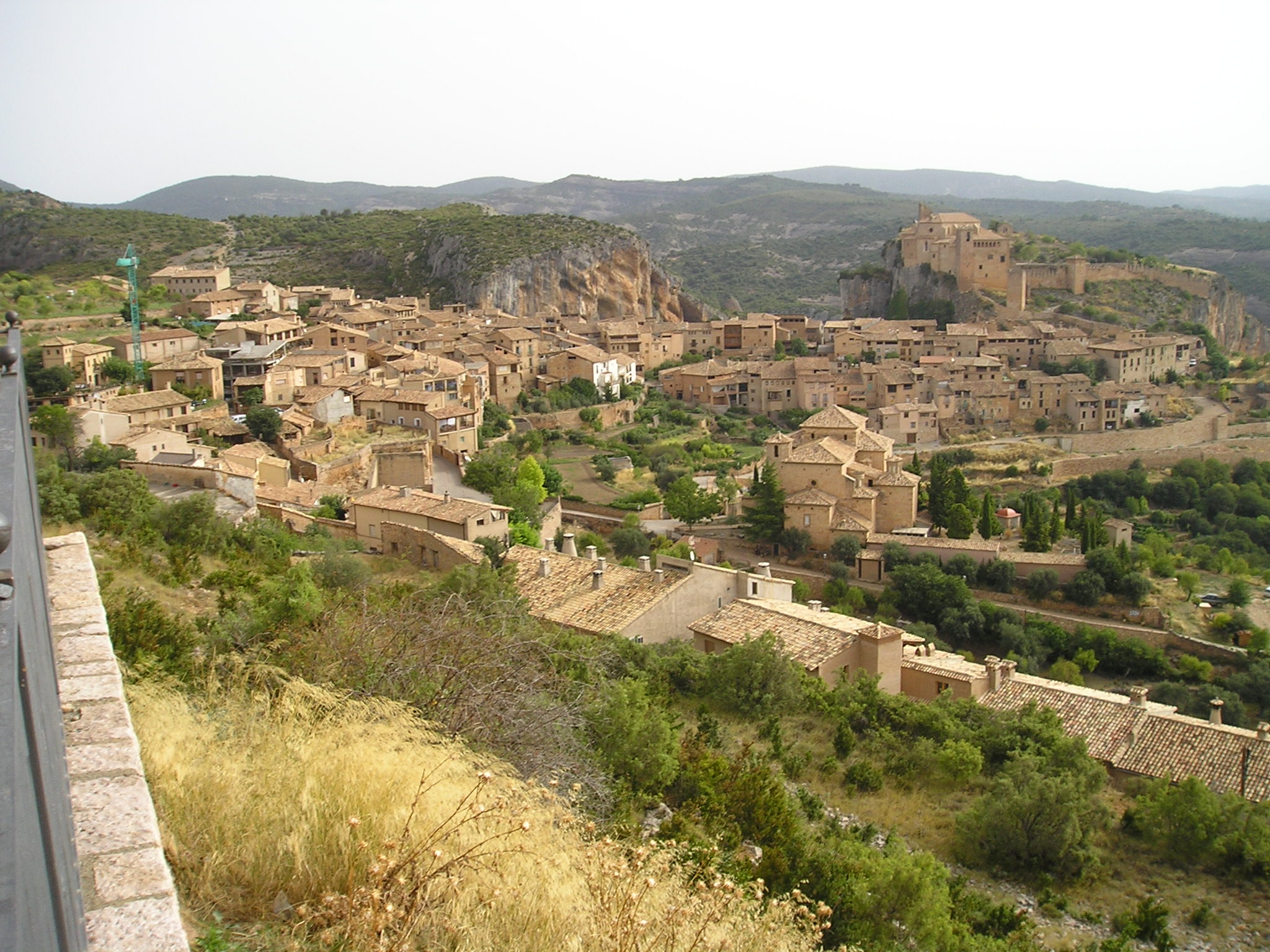
View of the village from above

== See also ==
- List of municipalities in Huesca
