= Pedruel =

- Locality
- Location within Aragon Location within Spain
- Coordinates: 42°15′43″N 0°5′12″W
- Country: Spain
- Autonomous community: Aragon
- Province: Province of Huesca
- Municipality: Bierge
- Elevation: 673 m (2,208 ft)

Population
  - Total: 5

Pedruel is a locality located in the municipality of Bierge, in Huesca province, Aragon, Spain. As of 2020, it has a population of 5.

== Geography ==
Pedruel is located 62km east-northeast of Huesca.
