= Nueno =

Coordinates: 42°16′N 0°26′W

- municipality
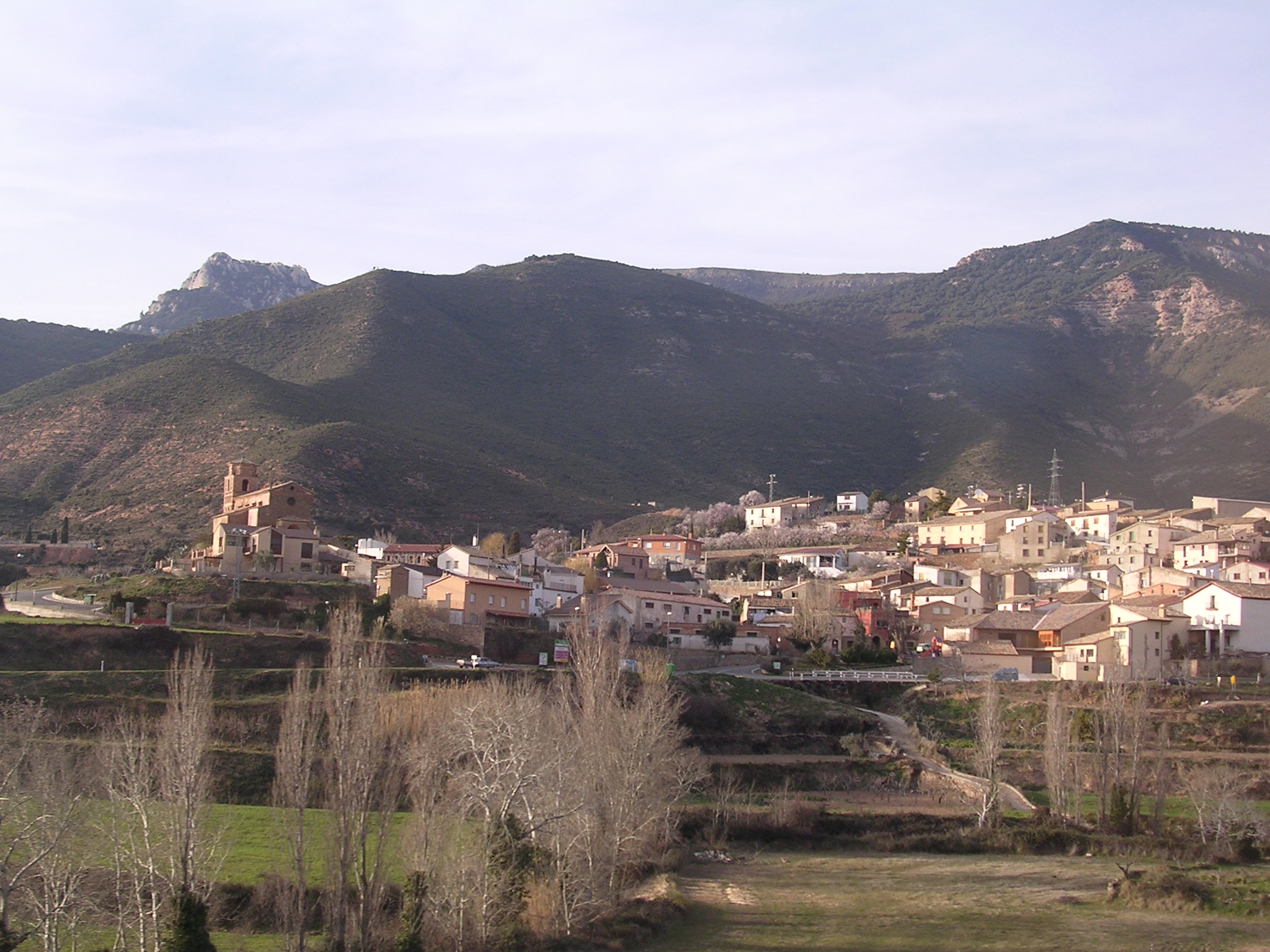
- Interactive map of Nueno
- Country: Spain
- Autonomous community: Aragon
- Province: Huesca
- Municipality: Nueno

Area
  - Total: 147.2 km^{2} (56.8 sq mi)
- Elevation: 726 m (2,382 ft)

Population (2025-01-01)
  - Total: 568
  - Density: 3.86/km^{2} (9.99/sq mi)
- Time zone: UTC+1 (CET)
  - Summer (DST): UTC+2 (CEST)

Nueno is a municipality located in the province of Huesca, Aragon, Spain. According to the 2008 census (INE), the municipality had a population of 524 inhabitants.

== List of villages in the municipality ==
- Arascués
- Belsué
- Nocito
- Santa Eulalia de la Peña

== See also ==
- List of municipalities in Huesca
