= Santa Eulalia de la Peña =

Coordinates: 42.2624°N 0.4059°W

Santa Eulalia de la Peña Santolarieta
- Interactive map of Santa Eulalia de la Peña
- Country: Spain
- Province: Huesca
- Municipality: Nueno
- Elevation: 1,060 m (3,480 ft)

Population (2014)
  - Total: 13

Santa Eulalia de la Peña (Aragonese: Santolarieta) is a village under the local government of the municipality of Nueno, Hoya de Huesca, Huesca, Aragon, Spain.
