= Belsué =

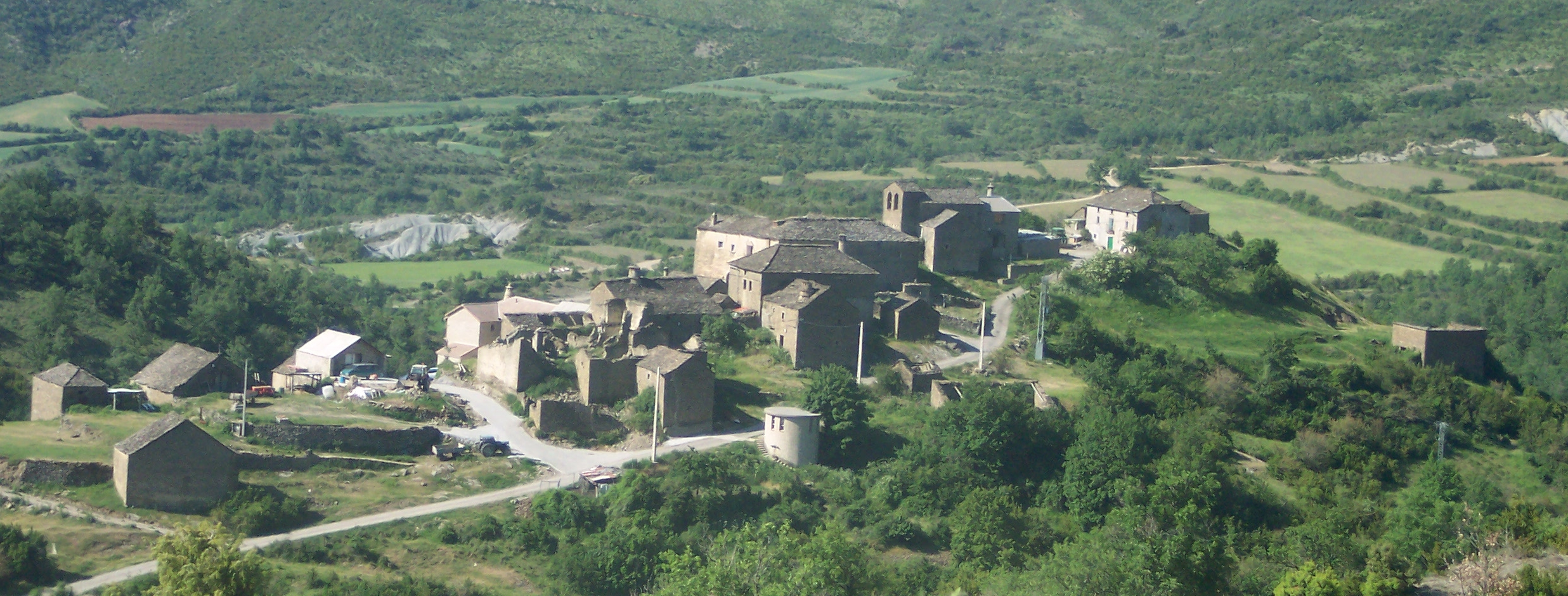
- View of the village

- Location within Spain
- Coordinates: 42°19′00″N 0°22′44″W
- Country: Spain
- Province: Huesca
- Municipality: Nueno
- Elevation: 934 m (3,064 ft)

Population (2017)
  - Total: 11
- Time zone: UTC+1 (CET)
  - Summer (DST): UTC+2 (CEST)

Belsué is a village under the local government of the municipality of Nueno, Hoya de Huesca, Huesca, Aragon, Spain. The village had 3 inhabitants in 2005.
