= San Saturnino (Huesca) =

- Locality
- Location within Aragon Location within Spain
- Coordinates: 42°14′39″N 0°4′56″W
- Country: Spain
- Autonomous community: Aragon
- Province: Province of Huesca
- Municipality: Bierge

Population
  - Total: 3

San Saturnino is a locality located in the municipality of Bierge, in Huesca province, Aragon, Spain. As of 2020, it has a population of 3.

== Geography ==
San Saturnino is located 58km east-northeast of Huesca.
