= Bierge =

Bierge, Spain
- Location within Aragon Location within Spain
- Coordinates: 42°10′N 0°05′W
- Country: Spain
- Autonomous community: Aragon
- Province: Huesca
- Municipality: Bierge

Government
  - Type: Mayor–council
  - Body: Ayuntamiento de Bierge
  - Mayor: Sergio Ferrer (PSOE)

Area
  - Total: 145 km^{2} (56 sq mi)
- Elevation: 600 m (2,000 ft)

Population (2025-01-01)
  - Total: 243
  - Density: 1.68/km^{2} (4.34/sq mi)
- Time zone: UTC+1 (CET)
  - Summer (DST): UTC+2 (CEST)

Bierge ([ˈbjeɾ.xe]; Aragonese: Biarche) is a municipality located in the province of Huesca, Aragon, Spain. According to the 2010 census (INE), the municipality has a population of 258 inhabitants.

== Geography ==
Bierge is at 600 meters on the sea, and it has the following villages:

- Las Almunias de Rodellar, Letosa, Morrano, Nasarre (deserted), Otín (deserted), Pedruel, Rodellar, San Hipólito, San Román, San Saturnino and Yaso.

In the mountain, near Nasarre and Otín, is the Dolmen Losa de la Mora.

== Cultural depictions ==
Crucial scenes of the film The Invisible Guest take place in Bierge.

== See also ==
- List of municipalities in Huesca
