= Alcanadre (river) =

River in Spain

Coordinates: 41.617367°N 0.205436°E

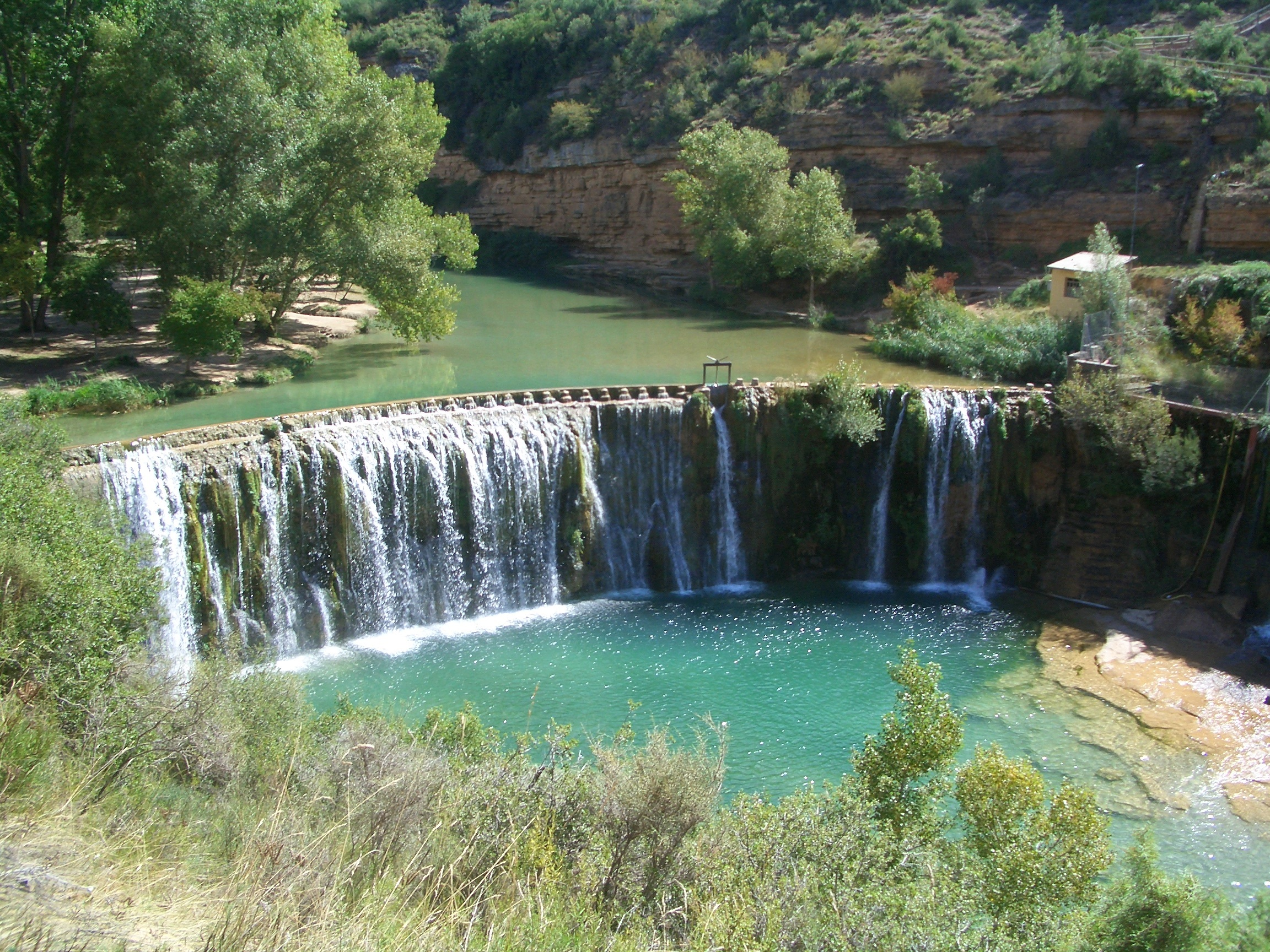

Location
- Country: Spain

Physical characteristics
- Source
  - elevation: 1,700 m (5,600 ft)
- Mouth
  - location: Cinca River
- Length: 147 km (91 mi)

The Alcanadre River is a river in northern Spain. It is a tributary of the Cinca River that runs through the province of Huesca. The source of the Alcanadre is in the Sierra de Galardón, and the river flows into the Cinca near the municipality of Ballobar.

Its main tributaries are the Isuala, the Barranco de Mascún, the Flumen, and the Guatizalema.
