= Bárcabo =

Coordinates: 42°14′N 0°04′E

Bárcabo (Spanish) Barcabo (Aragonese)
- municipality
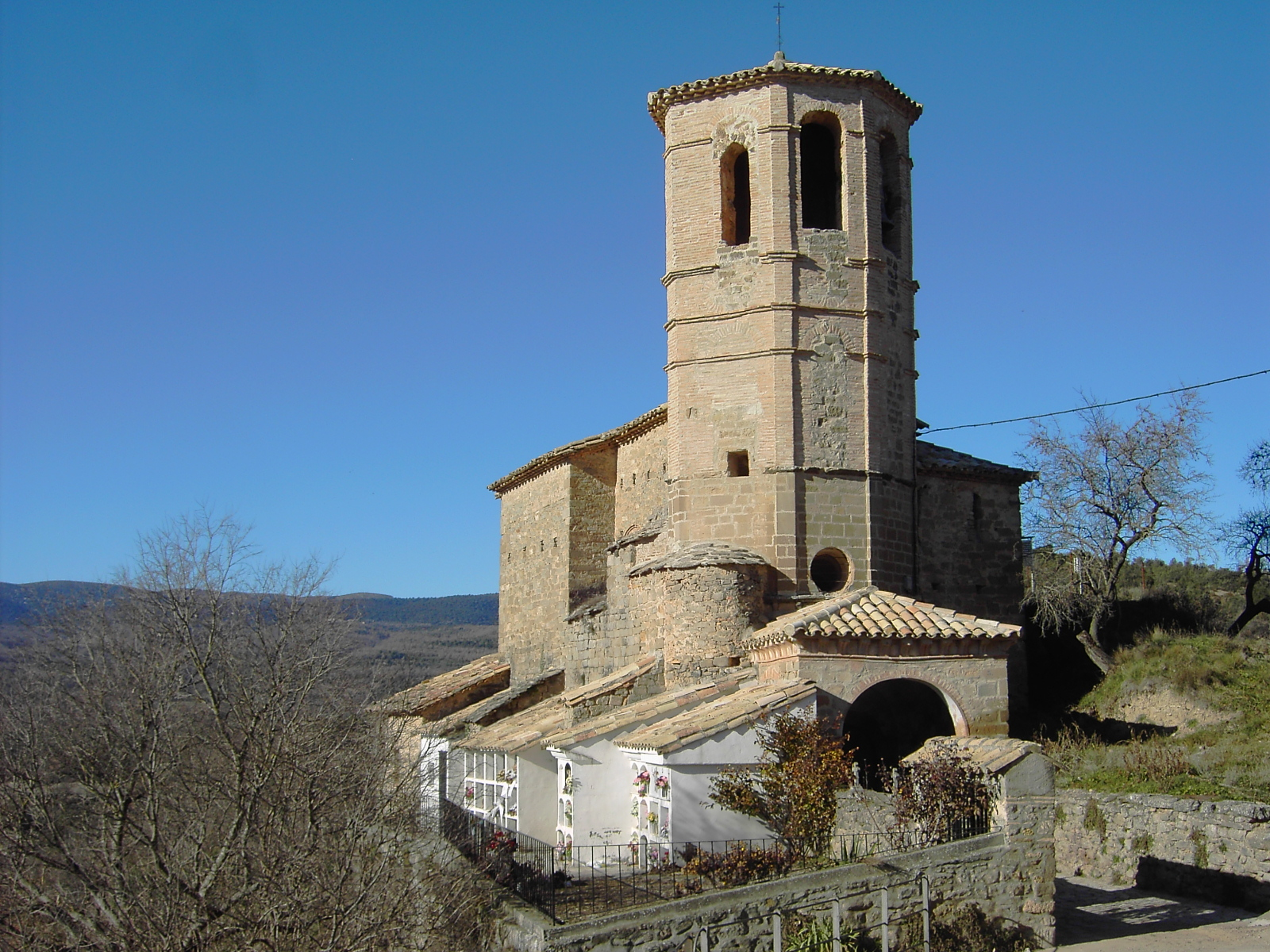
- Church in Bárcabo town.
- Interactive map of Bárcabo (Spanish)
- Country: Spain
- Autonomous community: Aragon
- Province: Huesca
- Municipality: Bárcabo

Area
  - Total: 88 km^{2} (34 sq mi)

Population (2025-01-01)
  - Total: 116
  - Density: 1.3/km^{2} (3.4/sq mi)
- Time zone: UTC+1 (CET)
  - Summer (DST): UTC+2 (CEST)

Bárcabo (in Aragonese: Barcabo) is a municipality located in the province of Huesca, Aragon, Spain. According to the 2018 census (INE), the municipality has a population of 105 inhabitants.

== See also ==
- List of municipalities in Huesca
