= Rodellar =

- Locality
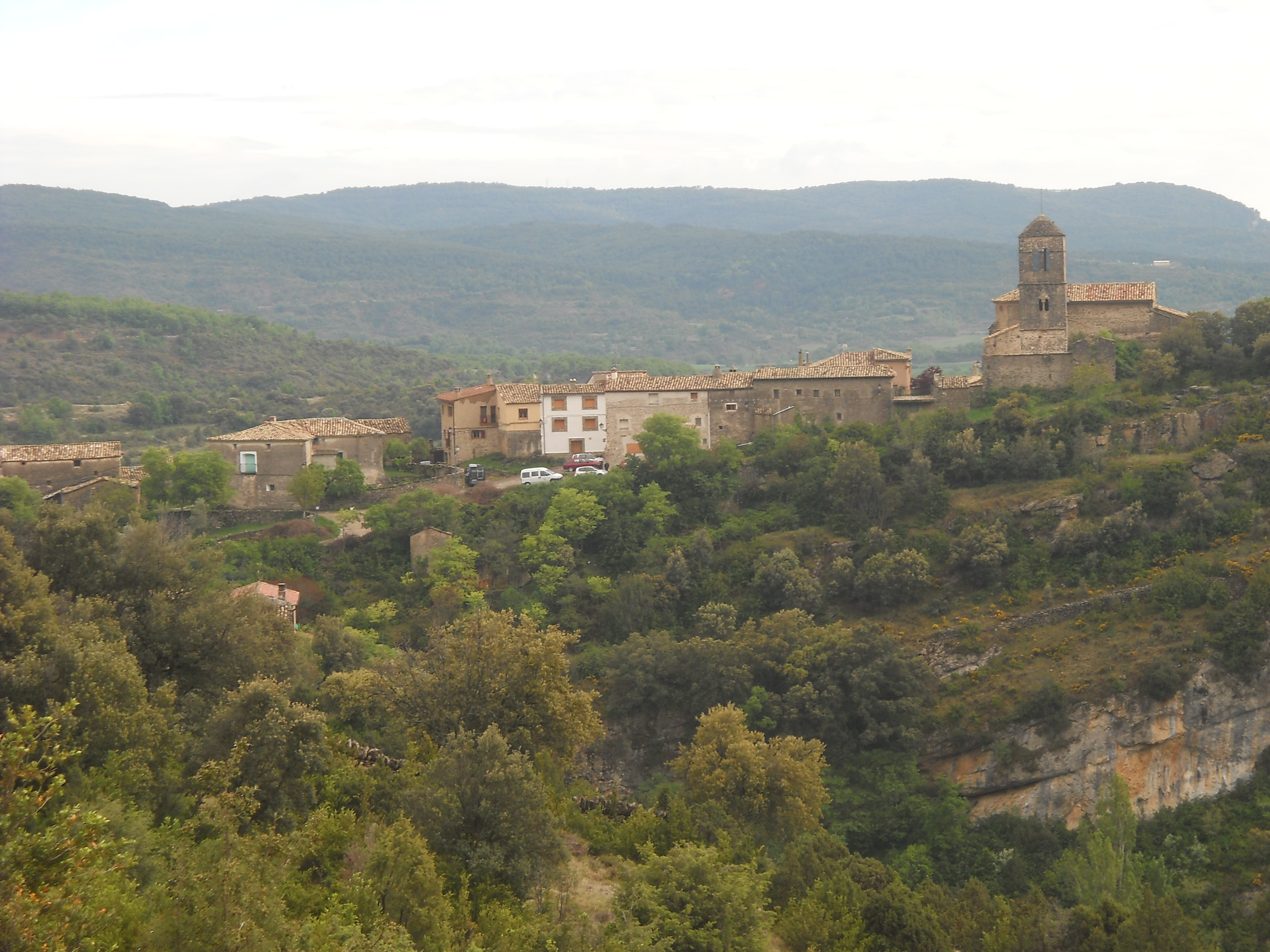

- Location within Aragon Location within Spain
- Coordinates: 42°16′55″N 0°4′49″W
- Country: Spain
- Autonomous community: Aragon
- Province: Province of Huesca
- Municipality: Bierge
- Elevation: 756 m (2,480 ft)

Population
  - Total: 54

Rodellar is a locality located in the municipality of Bierge, in Huesca province, Aragon, Spain. As of 2020, it has a population of 54.

== Geography ==
Rodellar is located 64km east-northeast of Huesca.
