= El pueblo (TV series) =

Spanish television series

- Genre: Comedy
- Created by: Alberto Caballero; Julián Sastre; Fernando Abad
- Directed by: Alberto Caballero; Laura Caballero; Roberto Monge
- Country of origin: Spain
- Original language: Spanish
- No. of seasons: 4

Production
- Running time: 50–70 min (approx.)
- Production companies: Mediaset España; Contubernio Films

Original release
- Network: Amazon Prime Video
- Release: 14 May 2019

El pueblo is a Spanish comedy television series created by Alberto Caballero, Julián Sastre and Fernando Abad. The plot concerns the arrival of a group of city dwellers to a tiny village and their ensuing experiences. It debuted on Amazon Prime Video in May 2019.

== Premise ==
The plot concerns the arrival of a group of "urbanites" to a tiny Sorian village presumed to be abandoned (Peñafría) drawn by an offer of affordable housing. The village happens to preserve a small number of native inhabitants with whom the urban immigrants interact.

== Cast ==
- Carlos Areces as Juanjo Soler.
- Ruth Díaz as Laura.
- Santi Millán as Moncho.
- Ingrid Rubio as Ruth.
- Elisa Drabben as Macarena.
- María Hervás as Amaya.
- Raúl Fernández as Pablo Armida.
- Blanca Rodríguez as Elisa Jiménez.
- Ángel Jodrá as Cándido Quintanilla, the Mayor.
- Vicente Gil as Arsacio.
- Empar Ferrer as María.
- Javier Losán as El Ovejas.
- Daniel Pérez Prada as Nacho.
- Norma Ruiz as Isa.
- Jairo Sánchez as Gustavo.
- Felipe Vélez as Echegui.
- Jordi Vilches as Chicho.

== Production and release ==
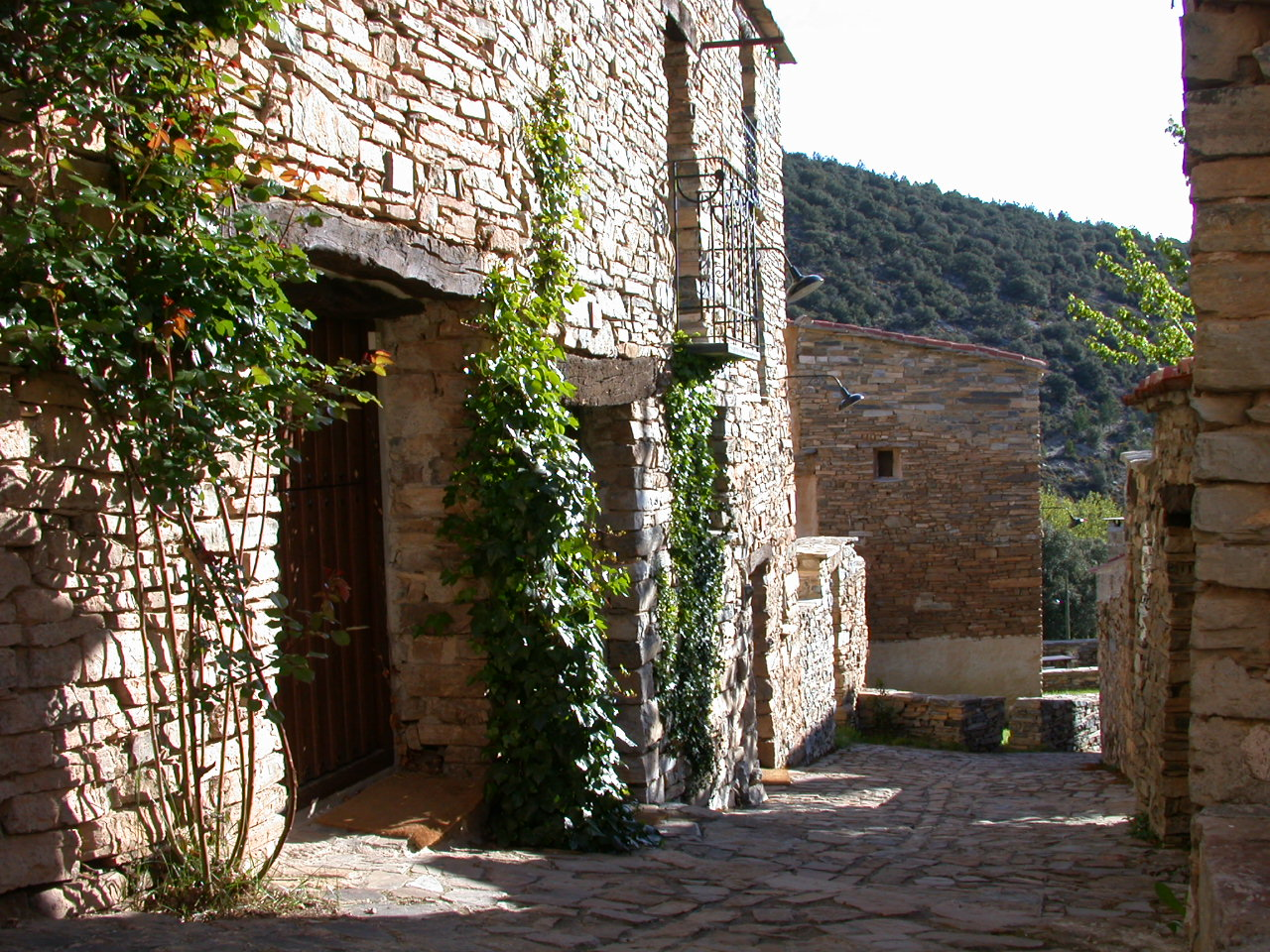
The abandoned village of Valdelavilla was used to portray Peñafría

Created by Alberto Caballero, Julián Sastre and Fernando Abad, El pueblo was produced by Mediaset España in collaboration with Conturbernio Films. Alberto Caballero (on behalf of Contubernio films) and Arantxa Écija (on behalf of Mediaset España) were credited as executive producers. Alberto Caballero, Laura Caballero and Roberto Monge directed the episodes, whereas Daniel Deorador and Araceli Álvarez de Sotomayor joined Alberto Caballero, Julián Sastre and Fernando Abad in the writing team. The first season consisted of 8 episodes featuring a running time of around 70 minutes. The first season was entirely shot in the province of Soria. While Valdelavilla was primarily used to portray the fictional village of Peñafría, other shooting locations included San Pedro Manrique, Valdeavellano de Tera, Los Rábanos and Soria.

Just like with other series, the Mediaset España's distributor Mediterráneo Mediaset España Group reached an agreement to cede the exclusive rights to Amazon Prime Video for a time before its free-to-air broadcasting run. The first season was thus originally released on Prime Video on 14 May 2019.

Filming of the second season was wrapped in October 2019. The second season consisted of another 8 episodes (featuring a 50-minute-long runtime on Amazon and a 70-min run for a later free-to-air airing). It was released on Prime Video on 14 February 2020.

Series	Episodes	Originally released	Network	Ref.
1	8	14 May 2019	Amazon Prime Video	TBA
2	8	14 February 2020	Amazon Prime Video	TBA

== Awards and nominations ==
Year	Award	Category	Nominee(s)	Result	Ref.
2021	8th MiM Series Awards	Best Comedy Series		Nominated	
2021	8th MiM Series Awards	Best Comedy Actor	Raúl Fernández	Nominated	
