= Jesús Cabrero =

Spanish footballer

Personal information
- Full name: Jesús Cabrero Mora
- Date of birth: 28 July 1981 (age 45)
- Place of birth: La Sotonera, Spain
- Height: 1.87 m (6 ft 1 1/2 in)
- Position: Goalkeeper

Youth career
- 1995–1996: Huesca
- 1996–2000: Zaragoza

Senior career*
Years	Team	Apps	(Gls)
1999–2003	Zaragoza B	7	(0)
2001–2002	→ Binéfar (loan)	3	(0)
2003–2004	Palencia	37	(0)
2004–2005	Mallorca B	33	(0)
2005	Burgos	0	(0)
2006–2007	Cartagena	22	(0)
2007–2008	Ponferradina	32	(0)
2008–2010	Albacete	50	(0)
2010–2012	Huesca	17	(0)
2012–2014	Recreativo	67	(0)
2014–2017	Mallorca	63	(0)
Total		331	(0)

International career
1999	Spain U17	2	(0)
1999	Spain U18	1	(0)
2001	Spain U20	1	(0)
- * Club domestic league appearances and goals

Jesús Cabrero Mora (born 28 July 1981 in La Sotonera, Aragon) is a Spanish former professional footballer who played as a goalkeeper.

== Career statistics ==
Appearances and goals by club, season and competition
Club	Season	League			National cup		Other		Total	
Club	Season	Division	Apps	Goals	Apps	Goals	Apps	Goals	Apps	Goals
Zaragoza B	1998–99	Segunda División B	1	0	—		—		1	0
Zaragoza B	2002–03	Segunda División B	6	0	—		—		6	0
Zaragoza B	Total		7	0	—		—		7	0
Binéfar (loan)	2001–02	Segunda División B	3	0	—		—		3	0
Palencia	2003–04	Segunda División B	37	0	2	0	—		39	0
Mallorca B	2004–05	Segunda División B	33	0	—		—		33	0
Burgos	2005–06	Segunda División B	0	0	3	0	—		3	0
Cartagena	2005–06	Segunda División B	13	0	—		2 (Note: Appearances in Segunda División B play-offs)	0	15	0
Cartagena	2006–07	Segunda División B	9	0	0	0	—		9	0
Cartagena	Total		22	0	0	0	2	0	24	0
Ponferradina	2007–08	Segunda División B	32	0	0	0	4	0	36	0
Albacete	2008–09	Segunda División	21	0	1	0	—		22	0
Albacete	2009–10	Segunda División	29	0	1	0	—		30	0
Albacete	Total		50	0	2	0	—		52	0
Huesca	2010–11	Segunda División	11	0	0	0	—		35	0
Huesca	2011–12	Segunda División	6	0	2	0	—		27	0
Huesca	Total		17	0	2	0	—		19	0
Recreativo	2012–13	Segunda División	25	0	1	0	—		26	0
Recreativo	2013–14	Segunda División	42	0	0	0	—		42	0
Recreativo	Total		67	0	1	0	—		68	0
Mallorca	2014–15	Segunda División	36	0	1	0	—		37	0
Mallorca	2015–16	Segunda División	9	0	1	0	—		10	0
Mallorca	2016–17	Segunda División	18	0	2	0	—		20	0
Mallorca	Total		63	0	4	0	—		67	0
Career total			331	0	14	0	6	0	351	0
