= Vicente Gil =

Vicente Gil may refer to:

- Vicente Gil Ros (born 1976), Spanish Paralympic swimmer
- Vicente Gil (actor) (born 1956), Spanish actor
