= Ermita de la Virgen de la Peña, Aniés =

Catholic monastery in Aragon, Spain

Coordinates: 42.3117°N 0.5584°W

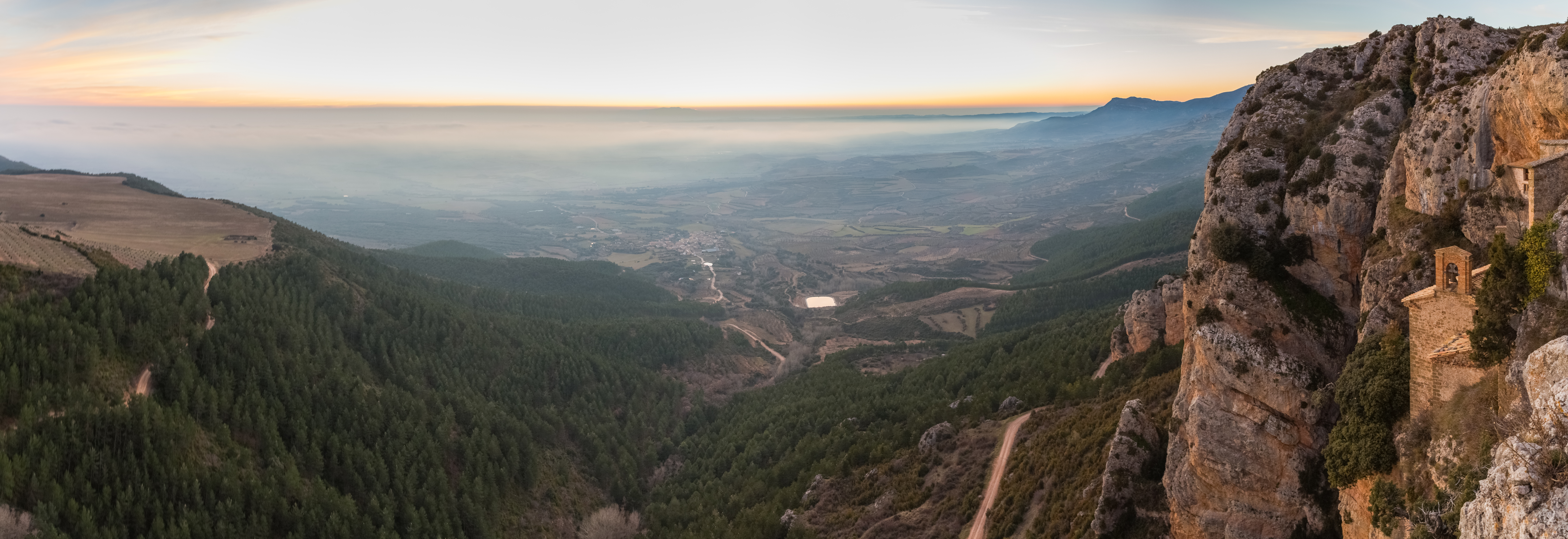
Hermitage of the Virgin of the Rock in Aniés, La Sotonera.

Ermita de la Virgen de la Peña (Hermitage of the Virgin of the Rock) is a catholic monastery and holy site in the hills overlooking Aniés, La Sotonera Municipality, Aragon, Spain.

The oldest parts of the sanctuary are of Romanesque style and were built in the 13th century. The hermitage is only accessible on foot, via a steep path in the forest and through caves in the mountain.

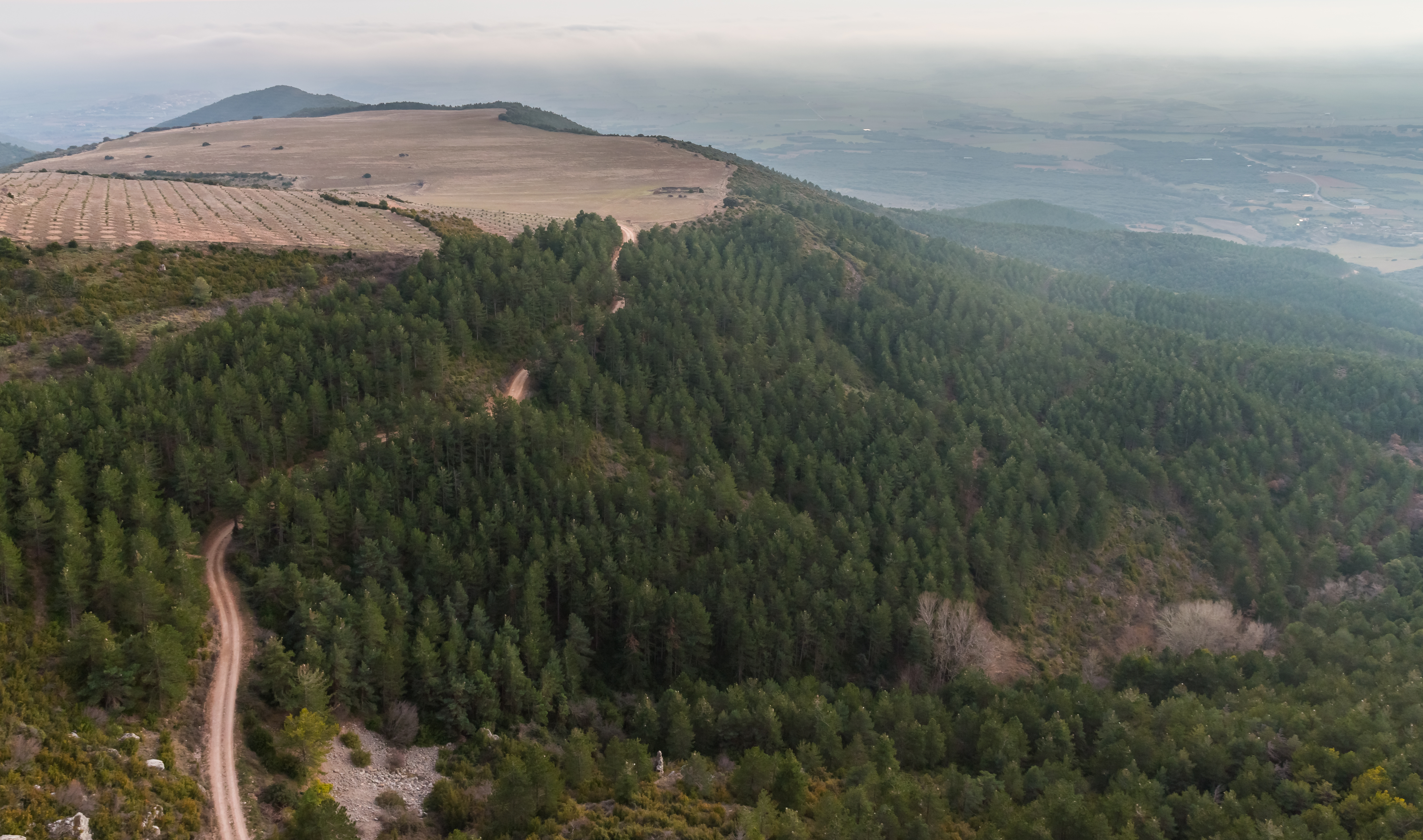
View from the sanctuary

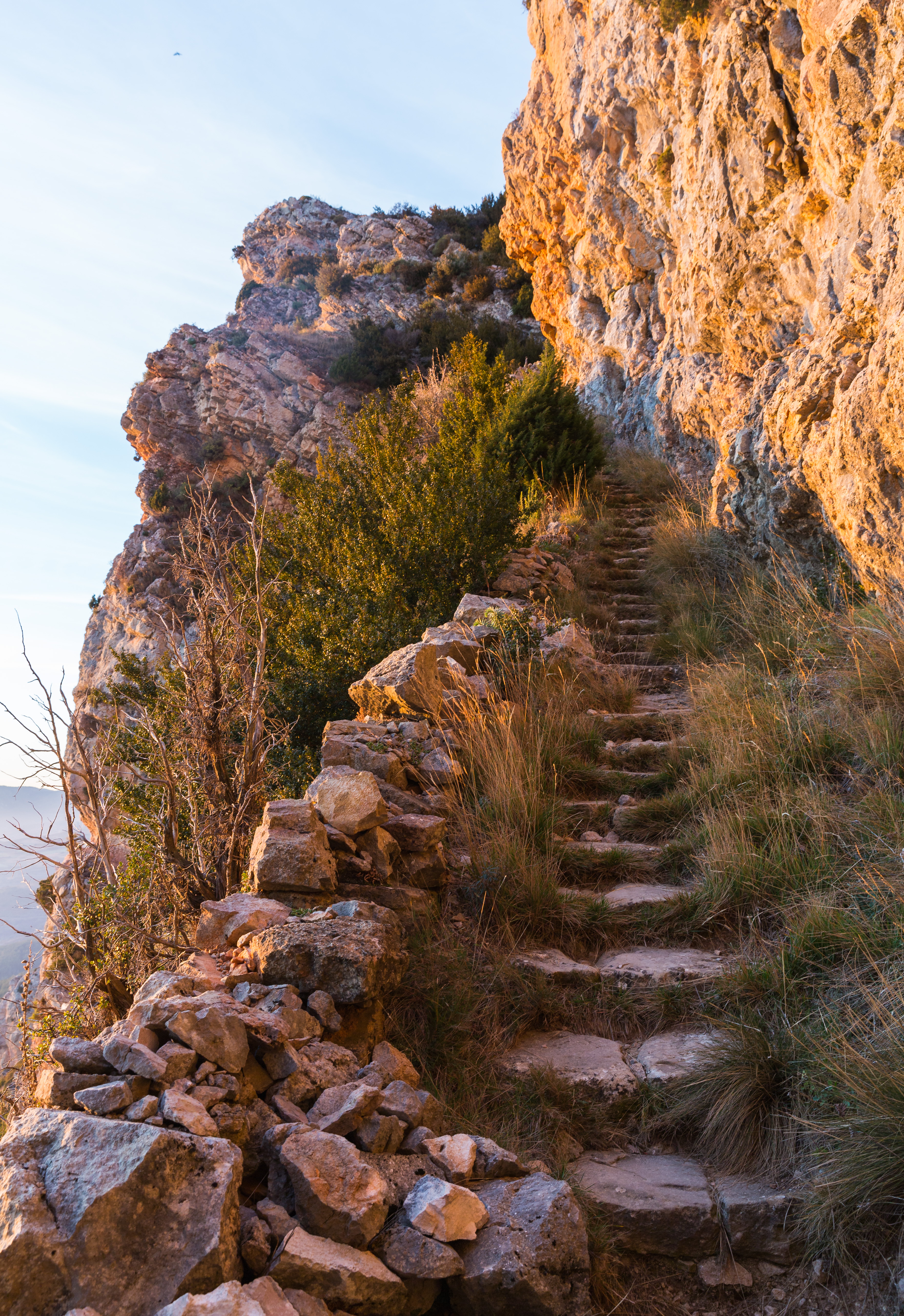
access to the sanctuary

== See also ==
- Ermita de la Virgen de la Peña (Mijas)
- Church of the Virgin of the Rocks, San Pedro Manrique
