= Chapel of the Virgin of the Rock (Mijas, Spain) =

Monastery and Catholic holy site in Spain

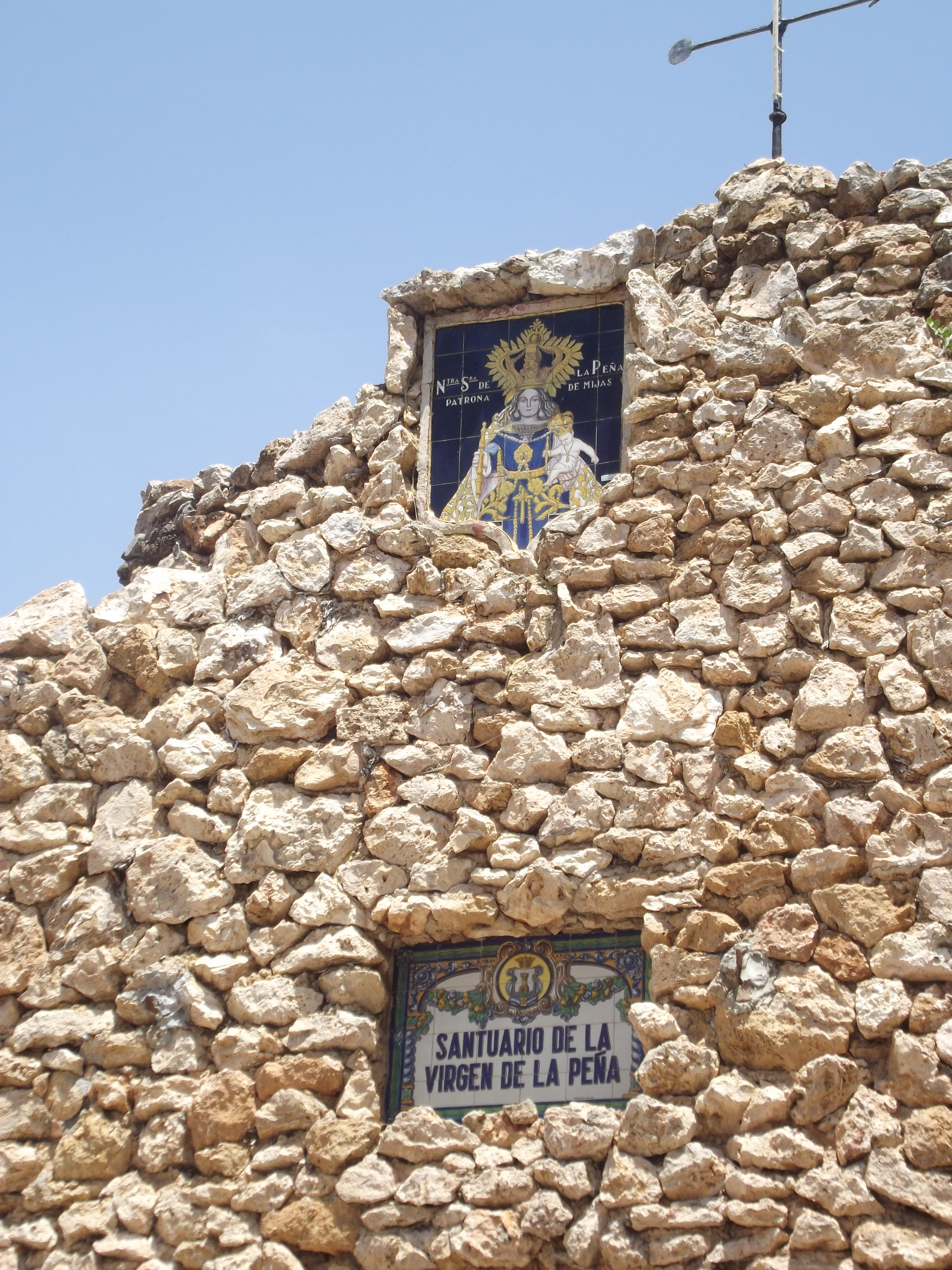
Chapel of the Virgin of the Rock

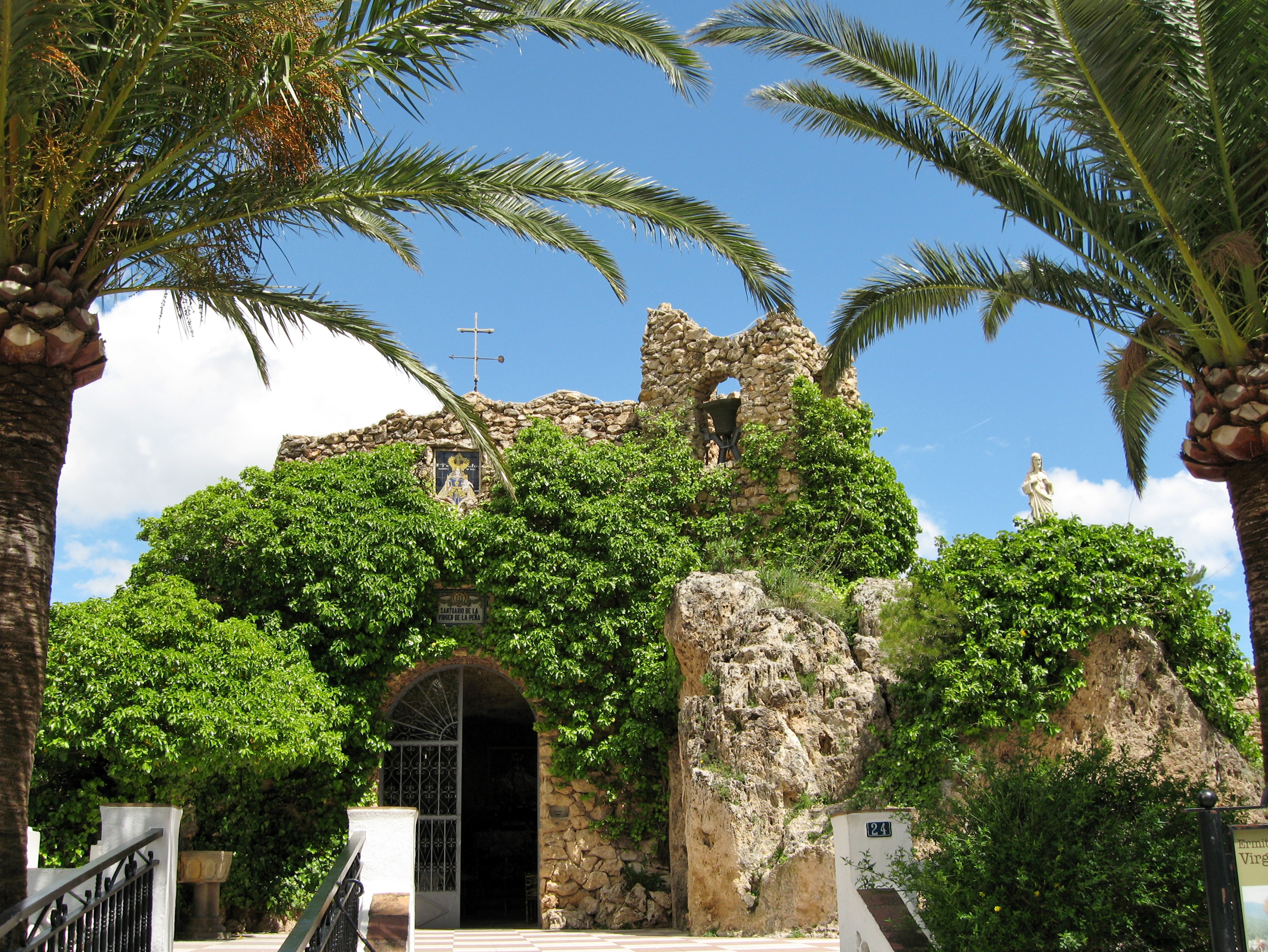
Fachada principal

La Ermita de la Virgen de la Peña de Mijas is a monastery and Catholic holy site in Mijas, Malaga province, Spain. It was excavated in the rock around 1548 by Mercedarian friars. According to tradition, Marian apparitions began in 1586, when two children, Juan and Asuncion Bernal Linaire, are credited with having a vision of Mary above the church. According to the tradition, they saw a white dove on the tower of the Castillo which transfigured into the virgin and notified their father, who reported the hiding place to the local church authorities of Mijas.

After the conquest of Andalusia by the Crown of Castile, legends and reports of Marian apparitions multiplied.

The Virgen de la Peña is the patron saint of Mijas.

== In popular culture ==
The famous Dutch singer Theo van Cleeff recorded his video clip "Sancta Maria" in the Chapel of the Virgin of the Rock. The altar is prominently displayed in the clip.

== See also ==
- Shrine of the Virgen de la Peña, San Pedro Manrique Aragon.
- Ermita de la Virgen de la Peña (Aniés, Spain)
