= Aniés, Aragon =

Coordinates: 42°18′N 0°35′W

Aniés is a town in the Hoya de Huesca in the municipality of La Sotonera, Huesca Province, Spain.

Located between the railway line and the Sotón river, at the foot of the Sierras de Santo Domingo y Caballera mountain range, 27 km from Huesca.

== History ==
The earliest mention of the town is 1084-1158, when it was listed as having tenants

In June 1198 the king Pedro II of Aragon gave the patronage right on the church at Aniés to bishop Ricardo de Huesca. In December 1201 Gudal Garcia, bishop of Huesca, created the Aniés Hospital Church In 1845 it had 114 houses 10, a School with 40 students 2 water powered flour mills Two grocery stores, and bakery. In 1960 the town was incorporated into the City of La Sotonera. The population of the town has declined from 236 in 1970 to 140 in 2004.

== Culture ==
There are two main festivities Held in the town:

- on 3 August in honor of the patron San Esteban, is the biggest festival is in honor of San Esteban, which include the offering of flowers and fruit and collection of cakes with chocolate and a final parade.
- on the second Saturday of May in honor of the Virgen de la Peña. On this day a pilgrimage to the shrine of the Virgin of La Peña and there is dancing at the foot of the hermitage chapel with a brass band and ham and wine distributed to all assistants.

Followed by a famous lamb stew, finishing the day with a dance in the village and popular dinner dividing snacks for all participants.

== Churches ==
- Church Iglesia parroquial dedicada a San Esteban
- Hermitage de Nuestra Señora de la Peña
- Hermitage of San Cristóbal
- Hermitage of Santa Bárbara
- Hermitage of San Cosme y San Damián

== Gallery ==
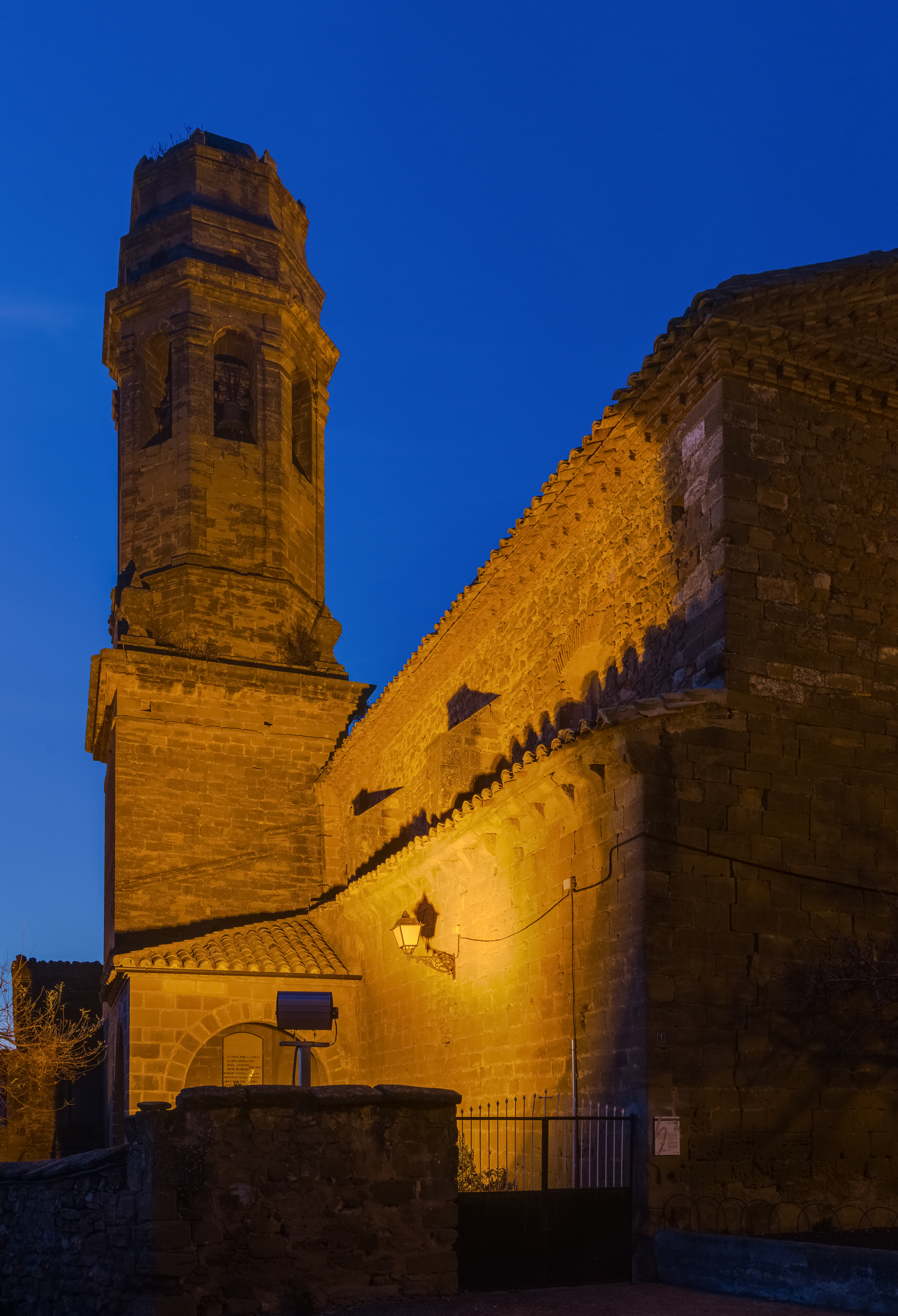
the Church of Saint Estaban

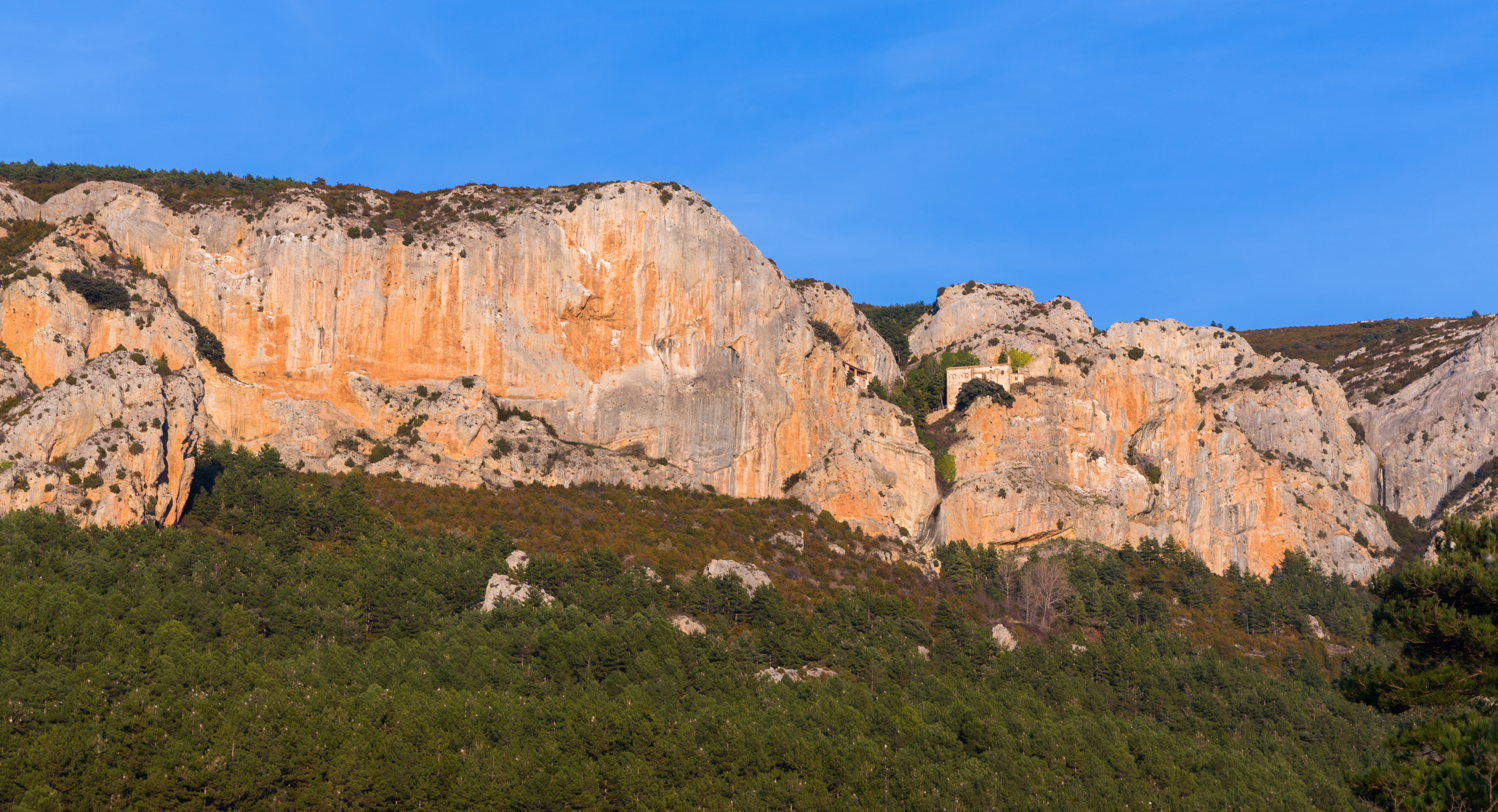
Sierras de Santo Domingo y Caballera

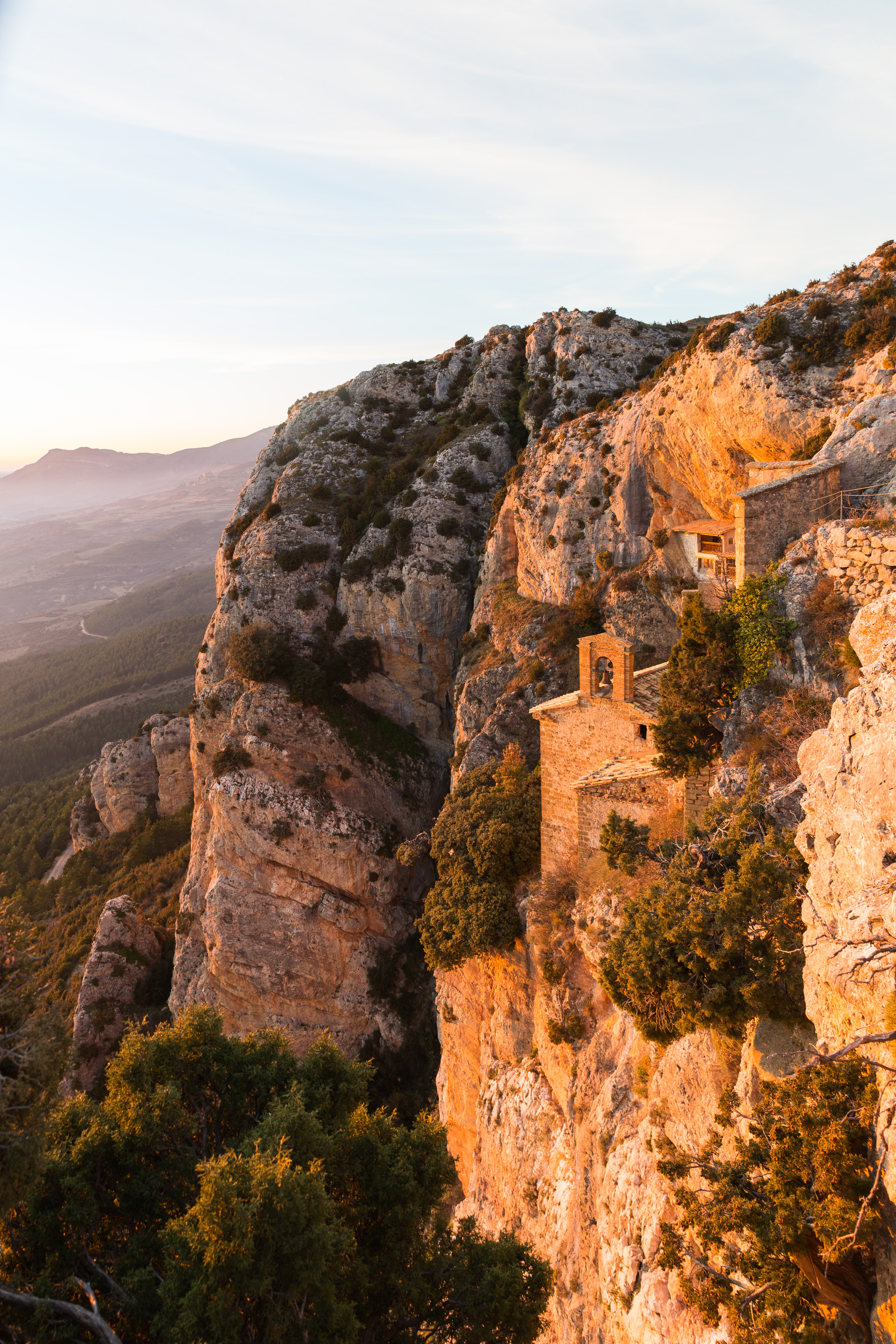
Ermita de la Virgen de la Peña
