= Bolea =

Coordinates: 42°15′35″N 0°33′10″W

- Seal
- Interactive map of Bolea
- Country: Spain
- Autonomous community: Aragon
- Province: Huesca
- Comarca: Hoya de Huesca
- Municipio: La Sotonera
- Elevation: 672 m (2,205 ft)

Population
  - Total: 470
- Time zone: UTC+1 (CET)
  - Summer (DST): UTC+2 (CEST)

For people with the surname, see Bolea (surname).

Bolea is a village in the La Sotonera municipality, situated in the province of Huesca in Aragon, Spain. It is located in the Hoya de Huesca area, between the city of Huesca and the town of Ayerbe and close to the river Sotón.

== History ==
With 470 inhabitants in 2018, Bolea is the largest settlement in La Sotonera. It is known for its Collegiate Church which was declared a National Monument of Historic and Artistic Value in February 1983

== Additional images ==
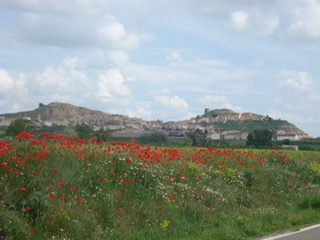
View of Bolea from the west showing Collegiate Church
