= Vicente Gil (actor) =

Spanish actor

Gil Vicente Martínez (born 26 January 1956 in Torrevieja) is a Spanish actor, best known for his role in the short film Timecode (2016) and the Amazon Prime Video series El pueblo (2019).

== Biography ==
Born in Torrevieja, he grew up in Barcelona, where he began working as an actor in 1980, under the guidance of Ramón Martí, amateur theater director of the Hermandad de Torrevejenses Ausentes de Barcelona, where his parents performed. His work covers different specialties, both in theater and in film and television, and he is very active as a voice actor, with more than 2,000 jobs under his belt.

He has appeared in more than 30 films and 12 short films. In 2010, he moved to Madrid, where he currently lives and pursues his artistic and professional career.

In 2016, he appeared in the short film directed by Juanjo Giménez, Timecode—nominated for the 2017 Oscars—which won the 2017 Goya Awards and the Palme d'Or for best short film at the Cannes Film Festival, having been selected from among more than 2,000 entries. On television, he has appeared in series in supporting roles, episodic characters, and leading roles.

In 2018, he began filming the series El pueblo for Telecinco and Amazon Prime Video in Valdelavilla (Soria), where he plays Arsacio, one of the five main characters and natives of the fictional village of Peñafría. In May 2021, he was filming the third season of El pueblo. In the summer of 2022, he will shoot the fourth and final season of the series.
