= ICONA =

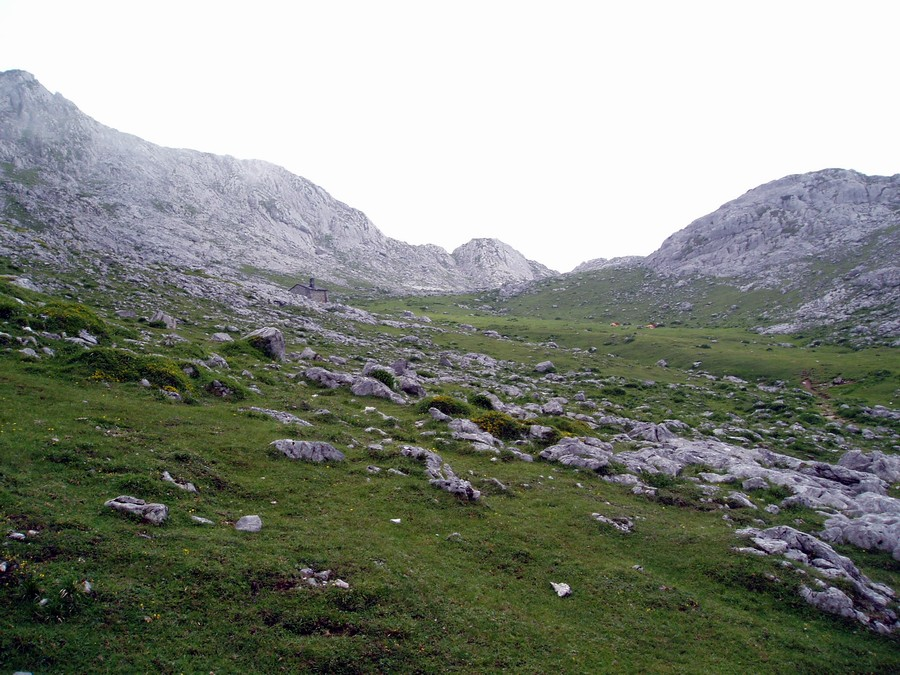
Former ICONA mountain hut at Ordiales, Asturias.

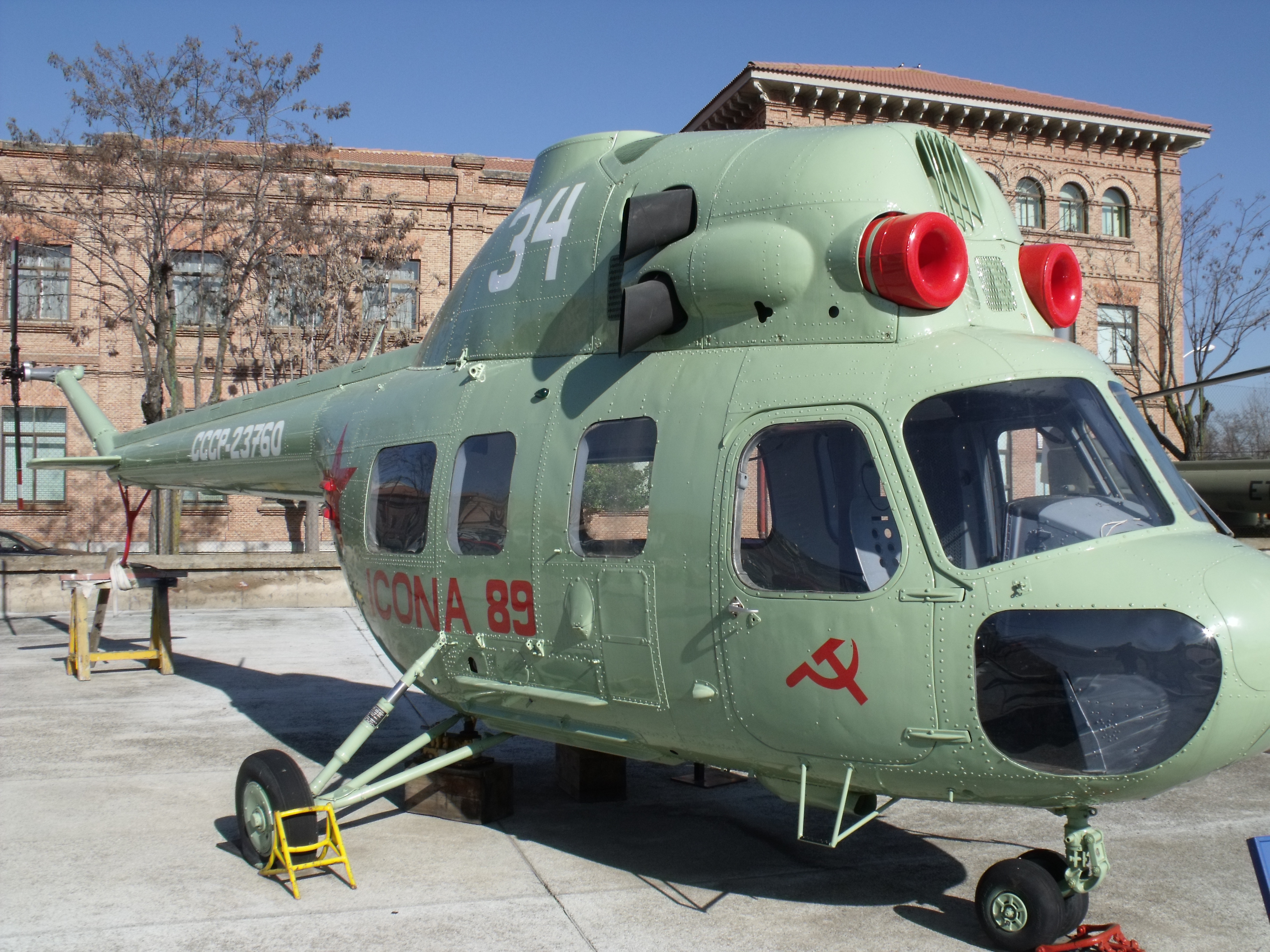
Soviet Mil Mi-2 helicopter hired by ICONA in the 1980s in order to fight forest fires. Museo del Aire, Cuatro Vientos, Madrid.

Instituto para la Conservación de la Naturaleza (Nature Conservation Institute), better known by its acronym ICONA (1971–1995) was the administrative entity that was established in Spain in order to preserve and research the natural environment in the Spanish territory.

Founded four years before Francisco Franco's death, ICONA played an ambiguous role regarding its ability to take care of the natural protected areas. Certain policies implemented by ICONA in the 1970s contributed to the depopulation of remote rural areas in different points of Spain, like for example in Acrijos, Soria and the Solana Valley in Aragon.

== History ==
Among the government departments that were founded in Spain for similar purposes, the following deserve mention:

- 1833, establishment of the Dirección General de Montes
- 1855, foundation of the Junta Consultiva de Montes, which later saw its name changed to Consejo Forestal, and then Consejo Superior de Montes, until it disappeared in 1967 after merging with the Consejo Superior Agrario
- 1928, the name of the Dirección General de Montes is changed to Dirección General de Montes, Caza y Pesca Fluvial during General Primo de Rivera's dictatorship; from then onwards it would depend on the Ministerio de Fomento.
- 1931, on top of the existing organizations, the Instituto Forestal de Investigación is founded during the Second Spanish Republic
- 1971, the Dirección General de Montes is replaced by ICONA
- 1991, ICONA is dismantled and merged into the Instituto Nacional de Investigación y Tecnología Agraria y Alimentaria
- 1996, foundation of the Ministerio del Medio Ambiente (Natural Environment Ministry) and the Dirección General de Conservación de la Naturaleza within it. The latter had two branches, the Subdirección de Conservación de la Biodiversidad and the ''Subdirección de Política Forestal which presently have become the Subdirección de Montes.

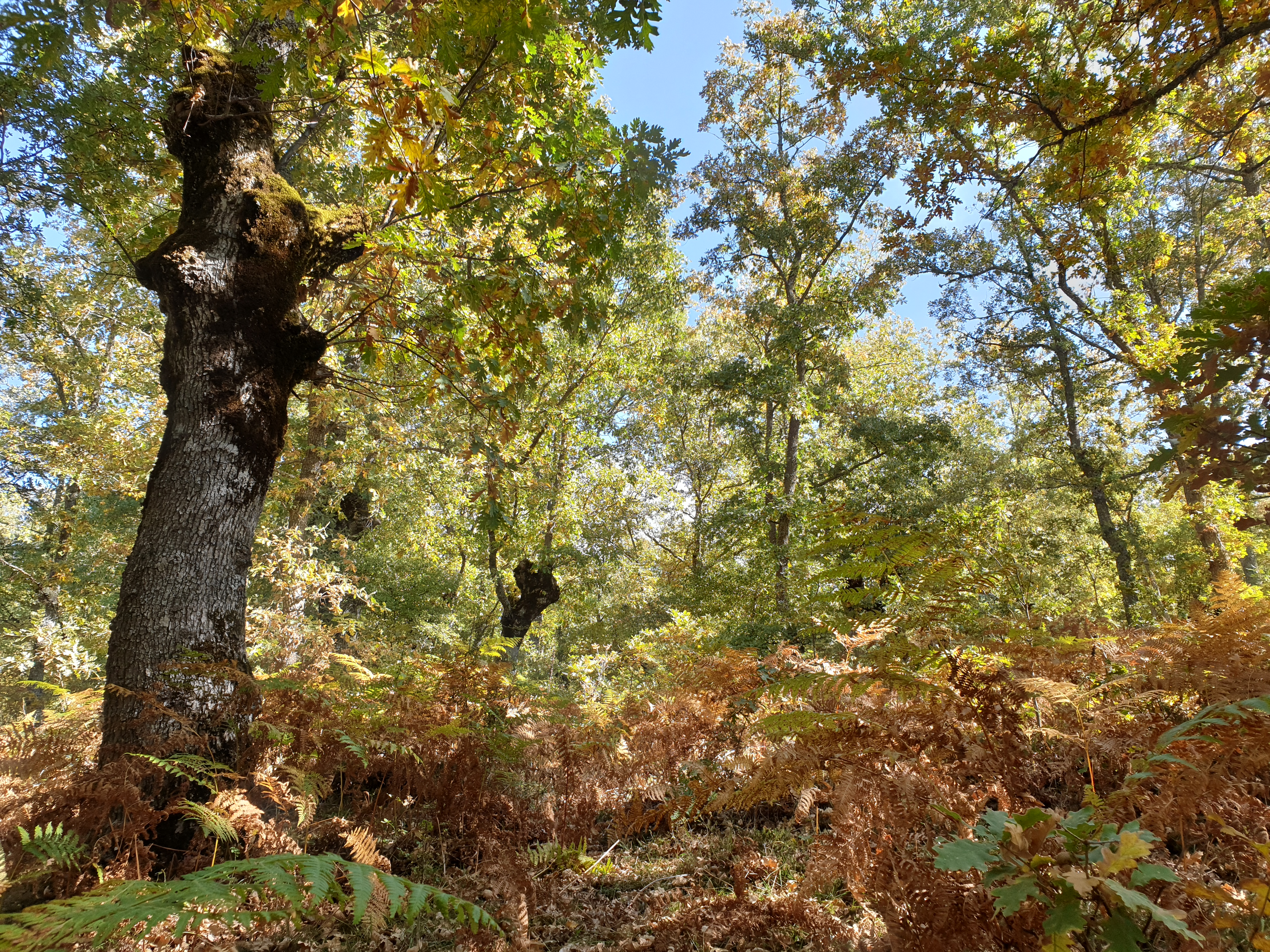
Burgos 2019. Original forest of Q. pyrenaica. In use.

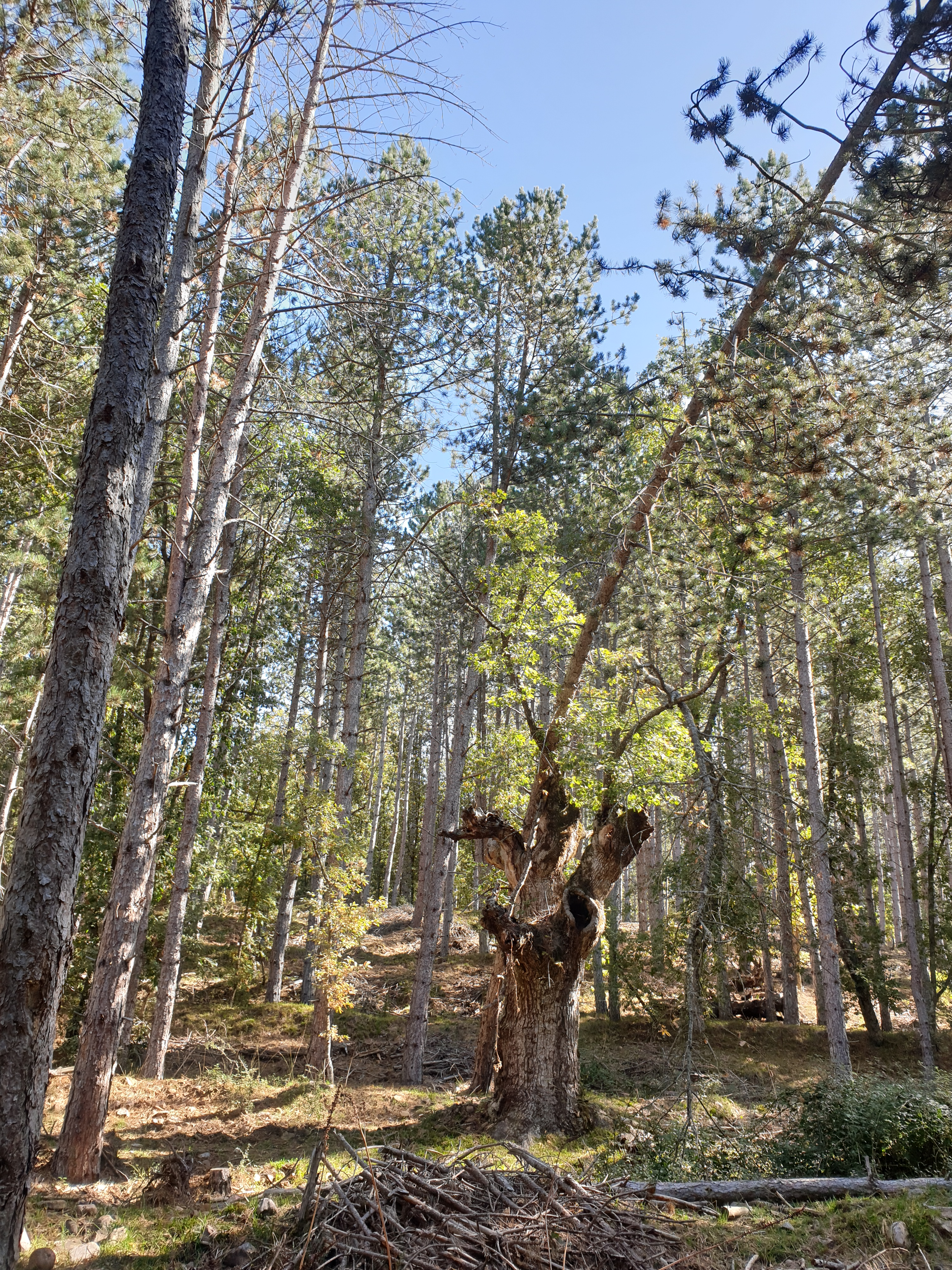
Burgos 2019. Icona's action on the original forest. Deforestation and plantation of pinus.

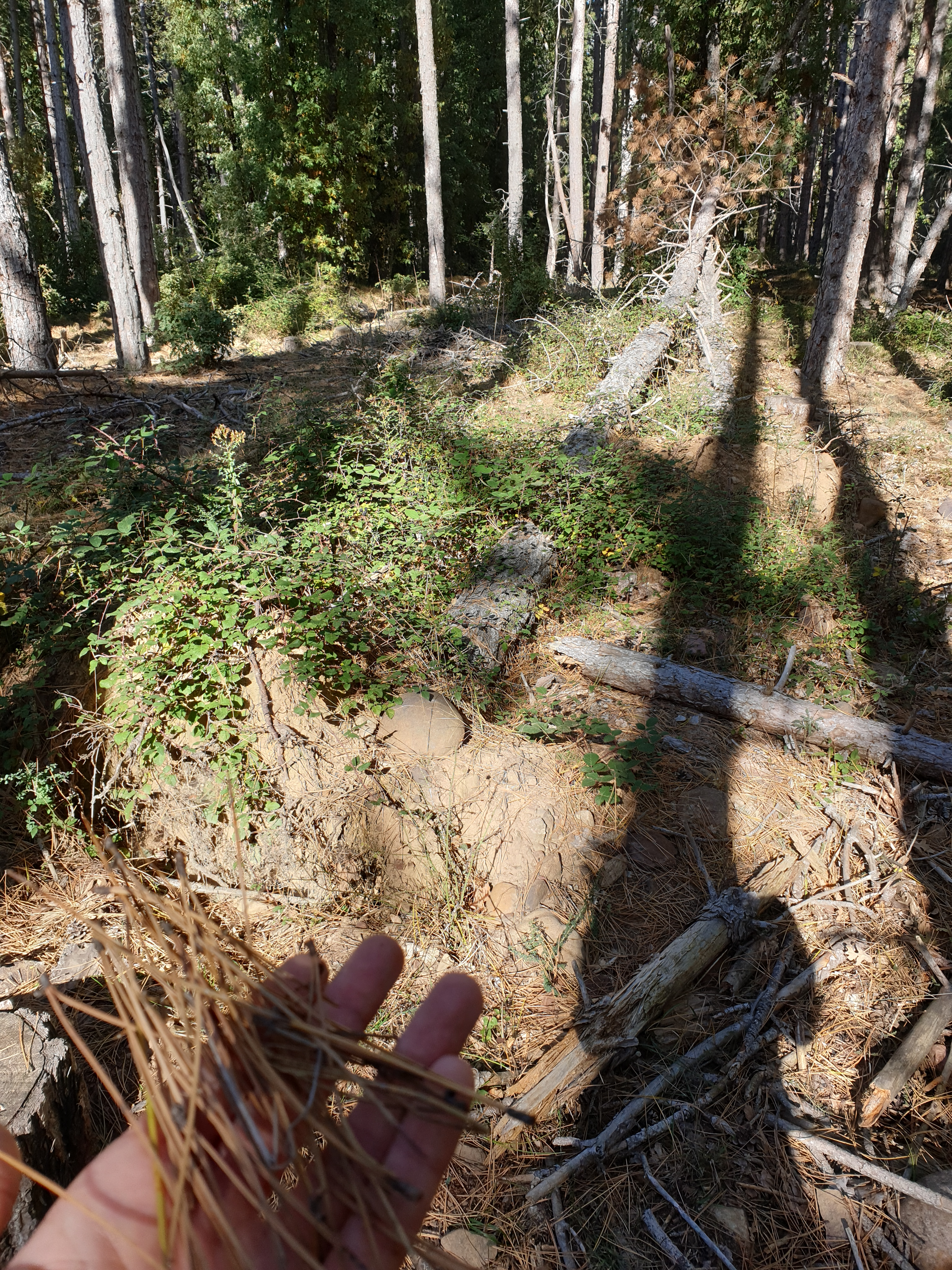
Burgos 2019. Icona's action on the original forest. Deforestation and plantation of pinus.

== Disambiguation ==
- L' Icona Ferragamo - 35th Anniversary Campaign in Celebration of Iconic Shoes by Salvatore Ferragamo
