= Acrijos =

Coordinates: 42°03′N 2°10′W

Acrijos is a village of municipality San Pedro Manrique in the province of Soria, Spain. At the end of 1966 the population of the village fled away due to the pressure induced by ICONA, the National Institute for Forestal recovery that had bought the land surrounding the village.

At the same time other villages in the neighbouring area, like Sarnago, Vea, Villarijo, Valdemoro, Buvanco, Armejun and Fuentevella lost their inhabitants for the same reason.

The descendants of the original population meet over summer and keep a virtual village.
