= Valdeavellano de Tera =

- Municipality
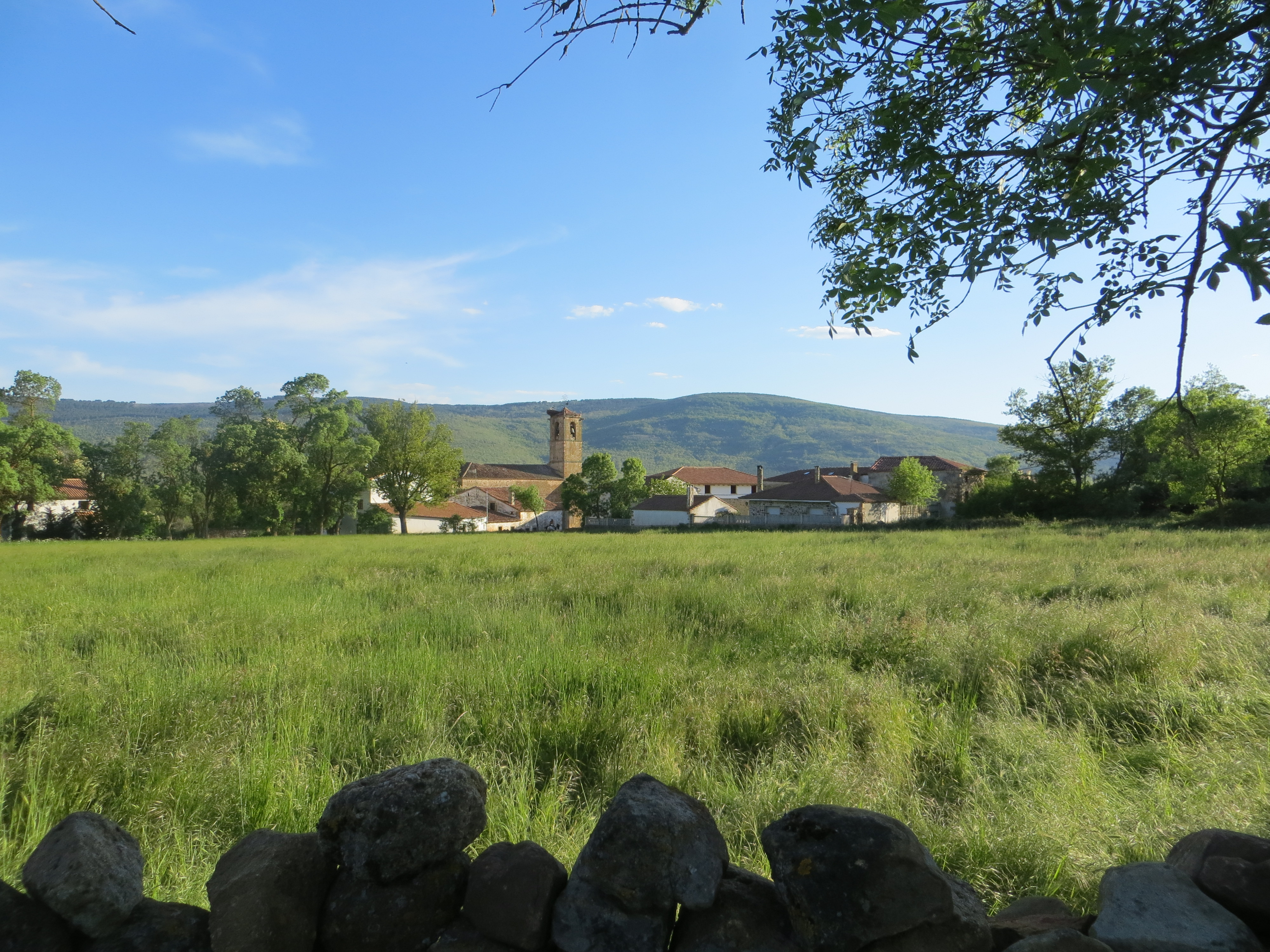

- Location in Spain. Valdeavellano de Tera (Spain)
- Coordinates: 41°57′N 2°35′W
- Country: Spain
- Autonomous community: Castile and León
- Province: Soria
- Municipality: Valdeavellano de Tera

Area
  - Total: 19.46 km^{2} (7.51 sq mi)
- Elevation: 1,139 m (3,737 ft)

Population (2025-01-01)
  - Total: 222
  - Density: 11.4/km^{2} (29.5/sq mi)
- Time zone: UTC+1 (CET)
  - Summer (DST): UTC+2 (CEST)
- Website: Official website

Valdeavellano de Tera is a municipality located in the province of Soria, Castile and León, Spain. According to the 2004 census (INE), the municipality has a population of 230 inhabitants.
