= Bolea (surname) =

Bolea is a surname. Notable people with the surname include:

- Adolfo Bolea (1933–2020), Spanish football forward and manager
- Carlos María Ariz Bolea (1928–2015), Panamanian Catholic bishop
- Fernando Bolea (1965–2024), Spanish handball player and handball coach
- Juan Antonio Bolea (1930–2021), Spanish politician
- María Teresa Estevan Bolea (born 1936), Spanish engineer and politician
- Vasile Bolea (born 1982), Moldovan politician, jurist and former rugby player
- Vladimir Bolea (born 1971), Moldovan politician
