= Los Rábanos =

- Municipality
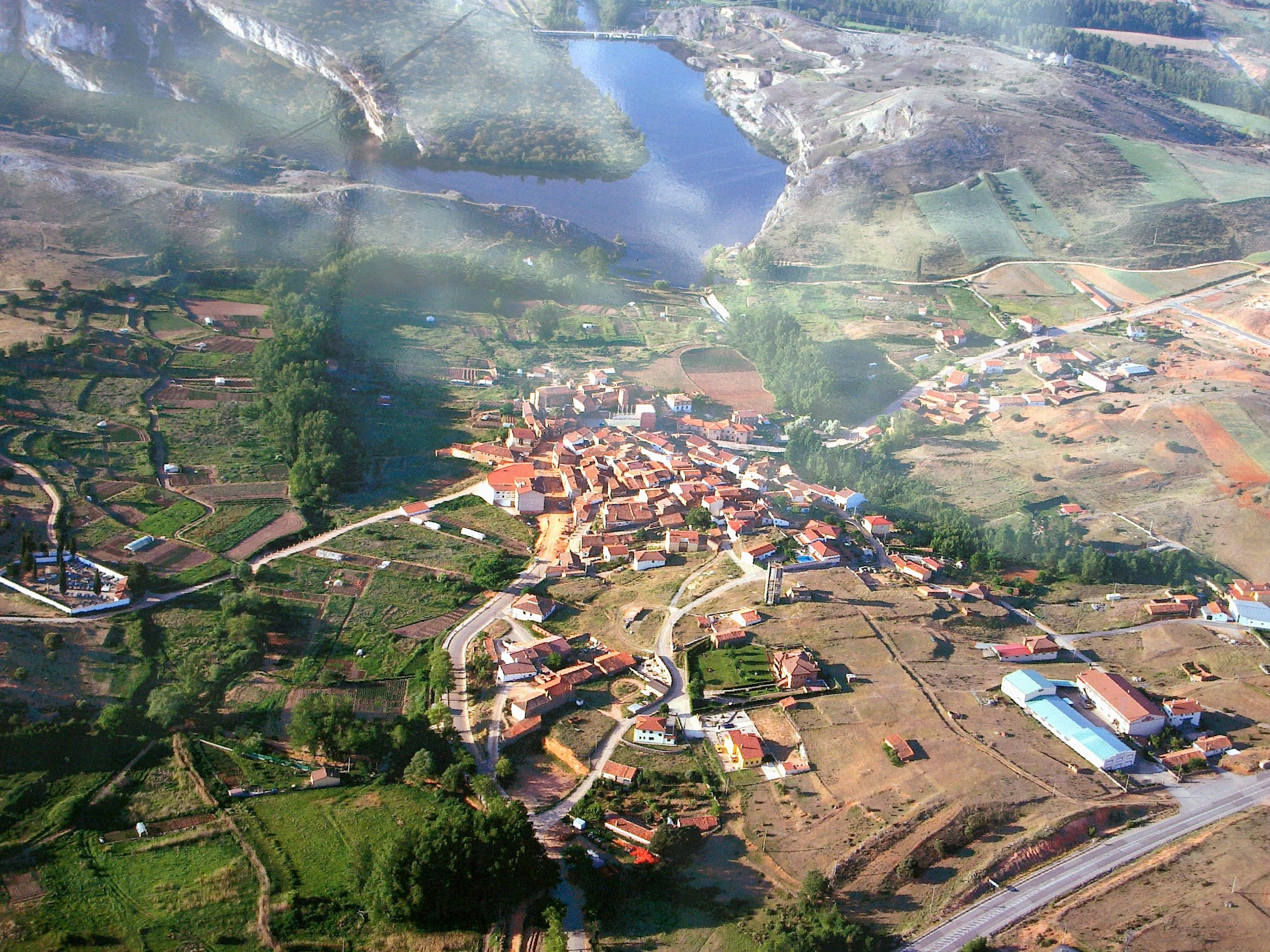
- Aerial view of Los Rabanos

- Coat of arms

- Location in Spain. Los Rábanos (Spain)
- Coordinates: 41°42′59″N 2°28′35″W
- Country: Spain
- Autonomous community: Castile and León
- Province: Soria
- Municipality: Los Rábanos

Area
  - Total: 101.53 km^{2} (39.20 sq mi)
- Elevation: 1,022 m (3,353 ft)

Population (2025-01-01)
  - Total: 470
  - Density: 4.6/km^{2} (12/sq mi)
- Time zone: UTC+1 (CET)
  - Summer (DST): UTC+2 (CEST)
- Website: Official website

Los Rábanos is a municipality located in the province of Soria, in the autonomous community of Castile and León, Spain.

Places in the municipality include Miranda de Duero.
