= Valdelavilla =

Coordinates: 42.6167°N 2.33333°W

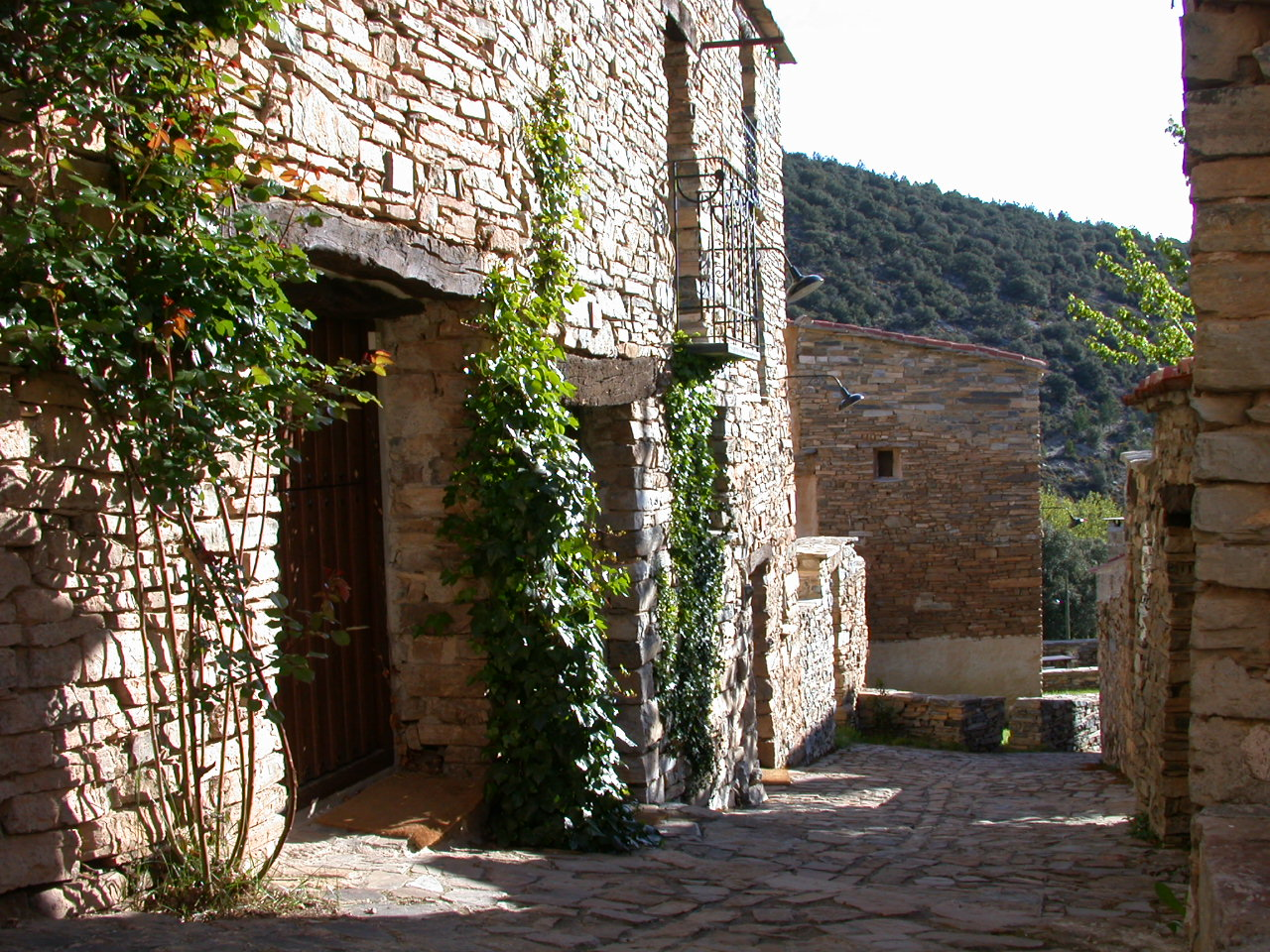
Valdelavilla

Valdelavilla is an uninhabited village in the Spanish province of Soria, in the autonomous community of Castile-León. A former municipality, it is located in the region of Tierras Altas and in the judicial district of Soria. It belongs to the municipality of San Pedro Manrique.

Valdelavilla gained popularity around 2020, after the release of Spanish series: El Pueblo. The town of Valdelavilla simulates Peñafría, the fictional town where most of the action in the series takes place. The series led to an increase in tourism in the town.

Depopulated during the 1960s, in 2001 it was converted into an English-language learning and tourism resort.
