= La Sotonera =

Coordinates: 42.238°N 0.542°E

La Sotonera, Spain A Sotonera
- municipality
- Interactive map of La Sotonera, Spain
- Country: Spain
- Autonomous community: Aragon
- Province: Huesca
- Municipality: La Sotonera

Area
  - Total: 165 km^{2} (64 sq mi)

Population (2025-01-01)
  - Total: 879
  - Density: 5.33/km^{2} (13.8/sq mi)
- Time zone: UTC+1 (CET)
  - Summer (DST): UTC+2 (CEST)

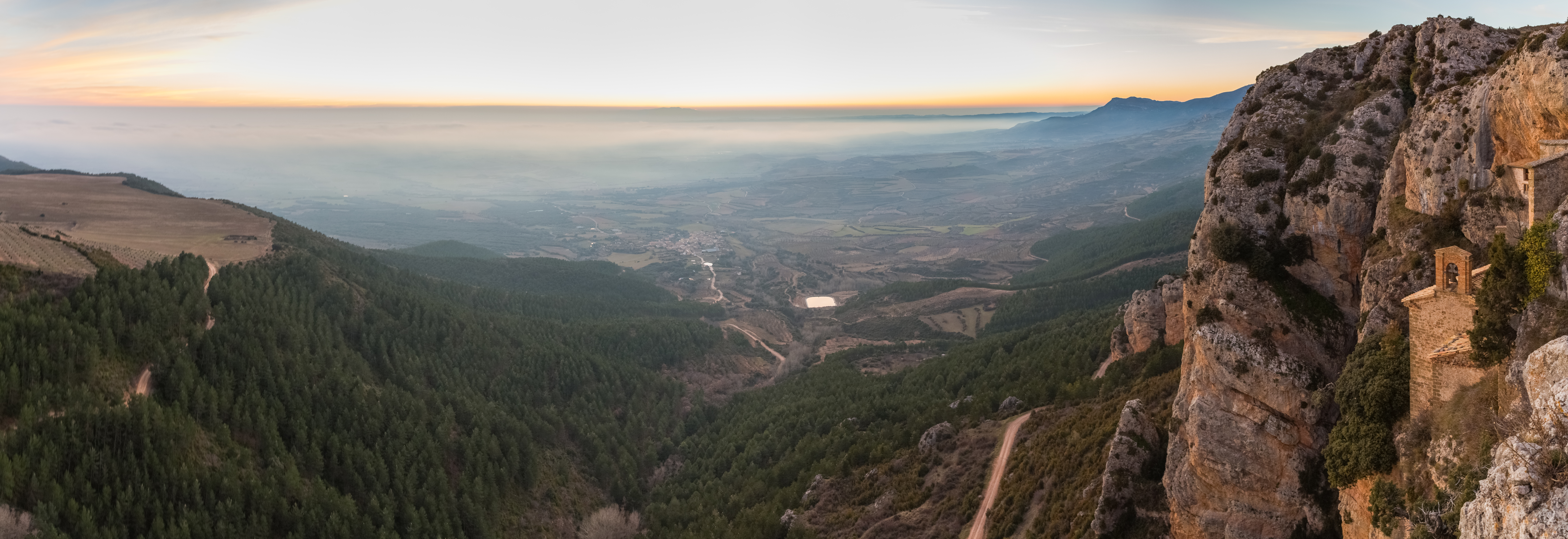
Hermitage of the Virgin of the Rock in Aniés, La Sotonera.

La Sotonera (Aragonese A Sotonera) is a municipality located in the province of Huesca, Aragon, Spain. It is situated between Huesca and Ayerbe in the Hoya de Huesca. According to 2018 (INE) data, the municipality has a population of 894 inhabitants.

The municipality was created in 1973 by merging the communities of Bolea, Esquedas, Lierta, Plasencia del Monte and Quinzano. Bolea had united in 1965 with the adjacent community of Puibolea, but previously Puibolea had been part of Lierta. Esquedas was owned by the Count of Sobradiel [es] from 1670 until being bought by the residents in 1921.

La Sotonera is 165.5 km^{2} in size, including a small exclave to the south-west of Banastás and Alerre. The Sierra de Gratal mountains make up the northern boundary of La Sotonera and include the emblematic Gratal peak with an elevation of 1567 metres. The Hermitage of the Virgin of the Rock is situated in this range overlooking Aniés.

The village of Bolea is the main settlement in La Sotonera and is well known for its Collegiate Church which was declared a National Monument of Historic and Artistic Value in February 1983.

La Sotonera has one railway station at Plasencia del Monte which is on the Renfe-operated line from Huesca to Jaca and Canfranc. Despite its name, the large reservoir known as Embalse de La Sotonera lies outside of the municipality to the south-west.
