= San Pedro Manrique =

- Municipality
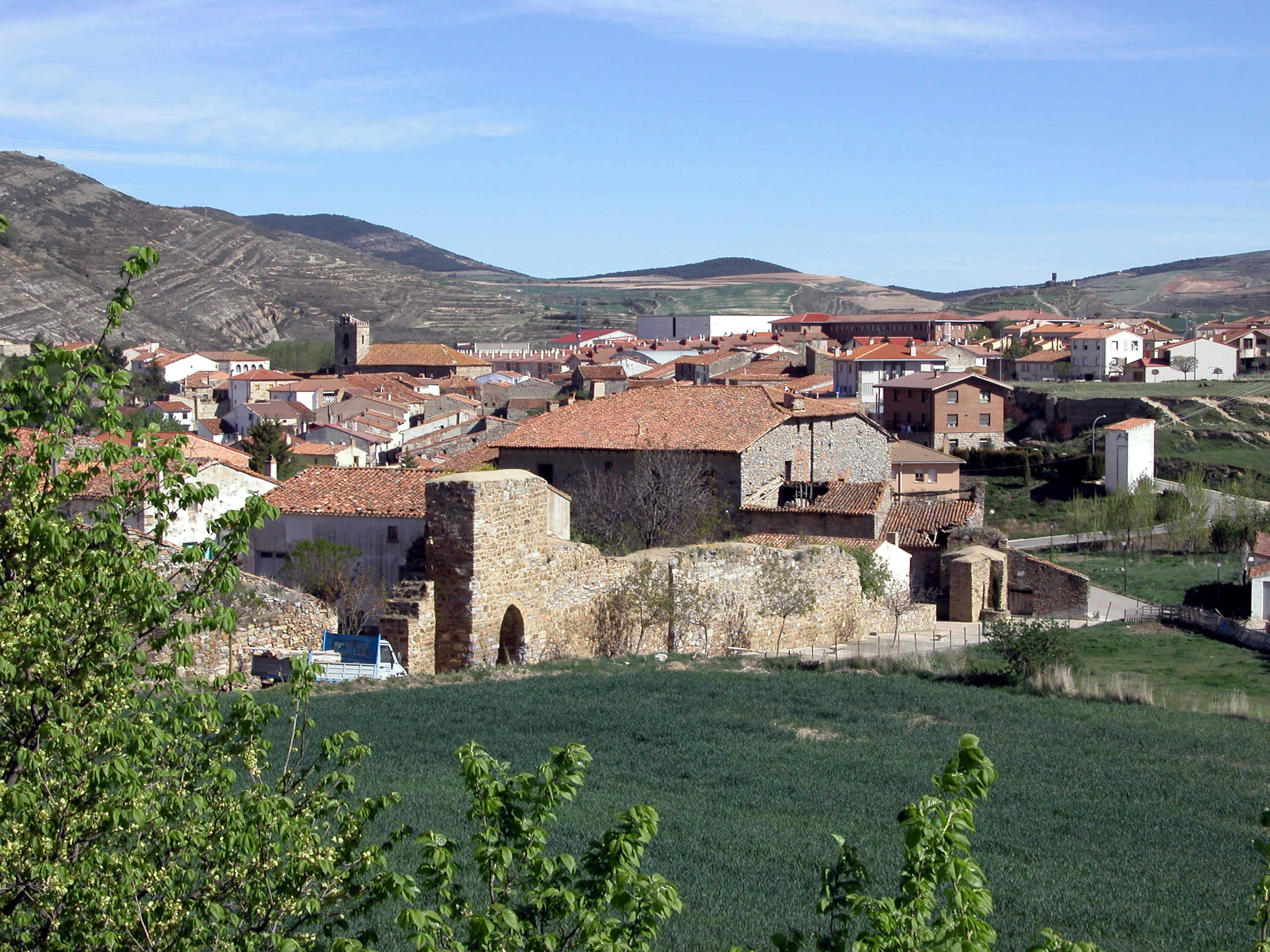

- Coat of arms

- Location in Spain. San Pedro Manrique (Spain)
- Coordinates: 42°01′52″N 2°13′54″W
- Country: Spain
- Autonomous community: Castile and León
- Province: Soria
- Comarca: Tierras Altas

Government
  - Mayor: Carlos Martínez Izquierdo

Area
  - Total: 176.20 km^{2} (68.03 sq mi)
- Elevation: 1,177 m (3,862 ft)

Population (2025-01-01)
  - Total: 626
  - Density: 3.55/km^{2} (9.20/sq mi)
- Time zone: UTC+1 (CET)
  - Summer (DST): UTC+2 (CEST)
- Climate: Cfb
- Website: Official website

San Pedro Manrique is a municipality in the province of Soria, Castile and León, Spain. As of 2009, it had 626 inhabitants. Since the mid-nineteenth century this municipality has aggregated smaller villages.

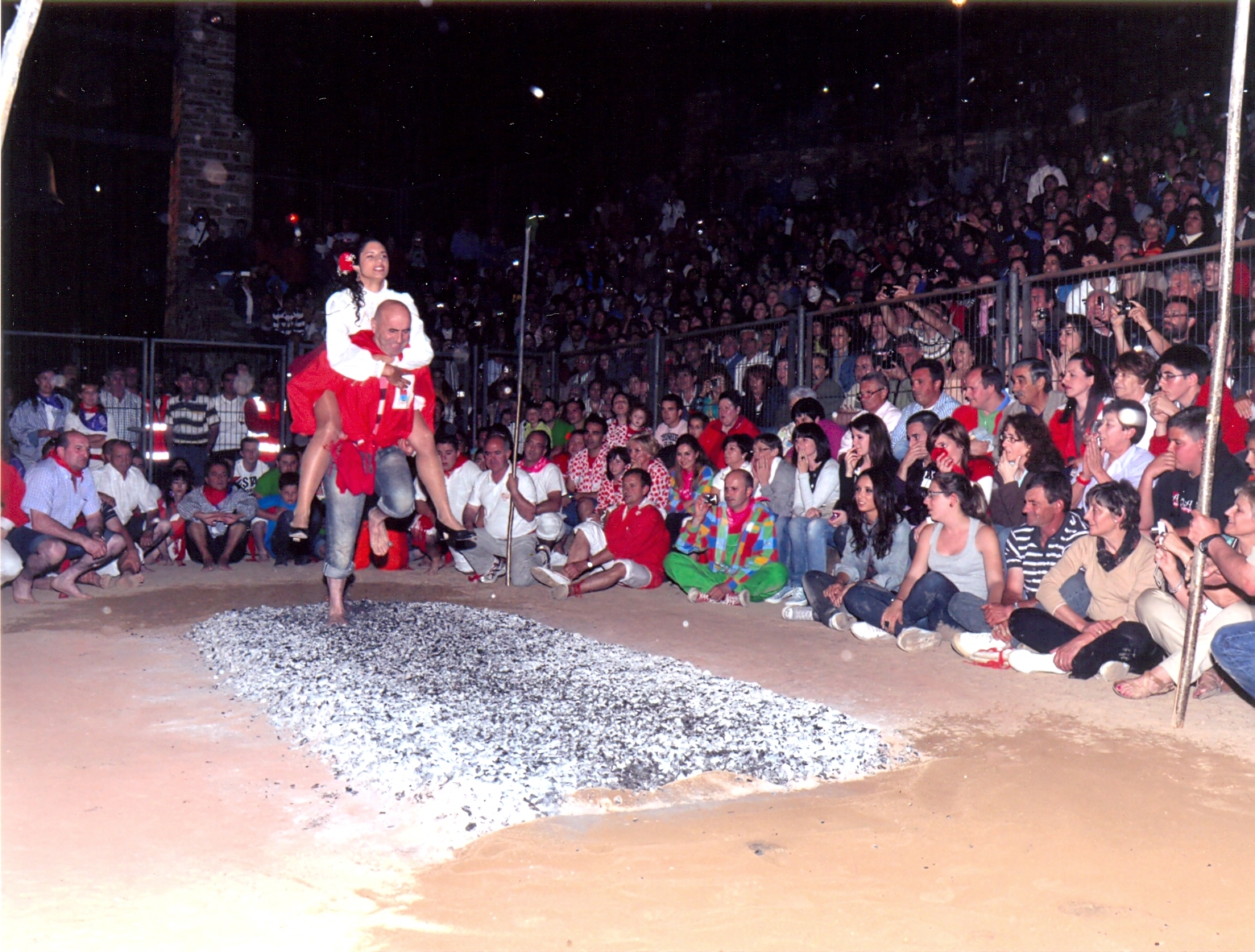
The Paso del Fuego in San Pedro Manrique

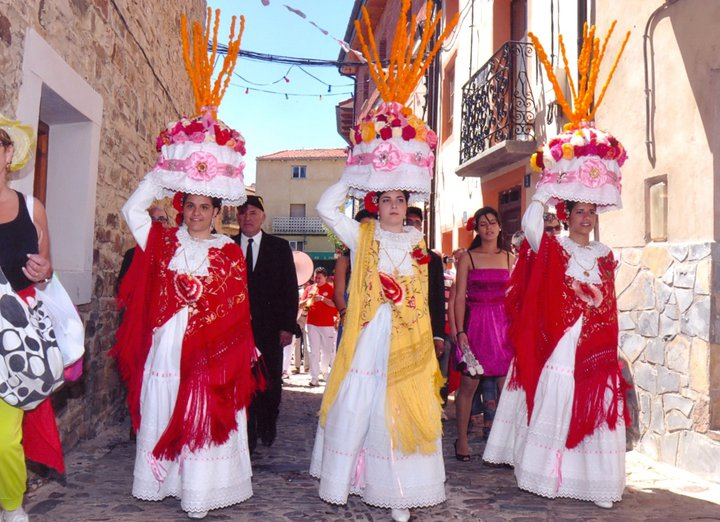
Móndidas in San Pedro Manrique

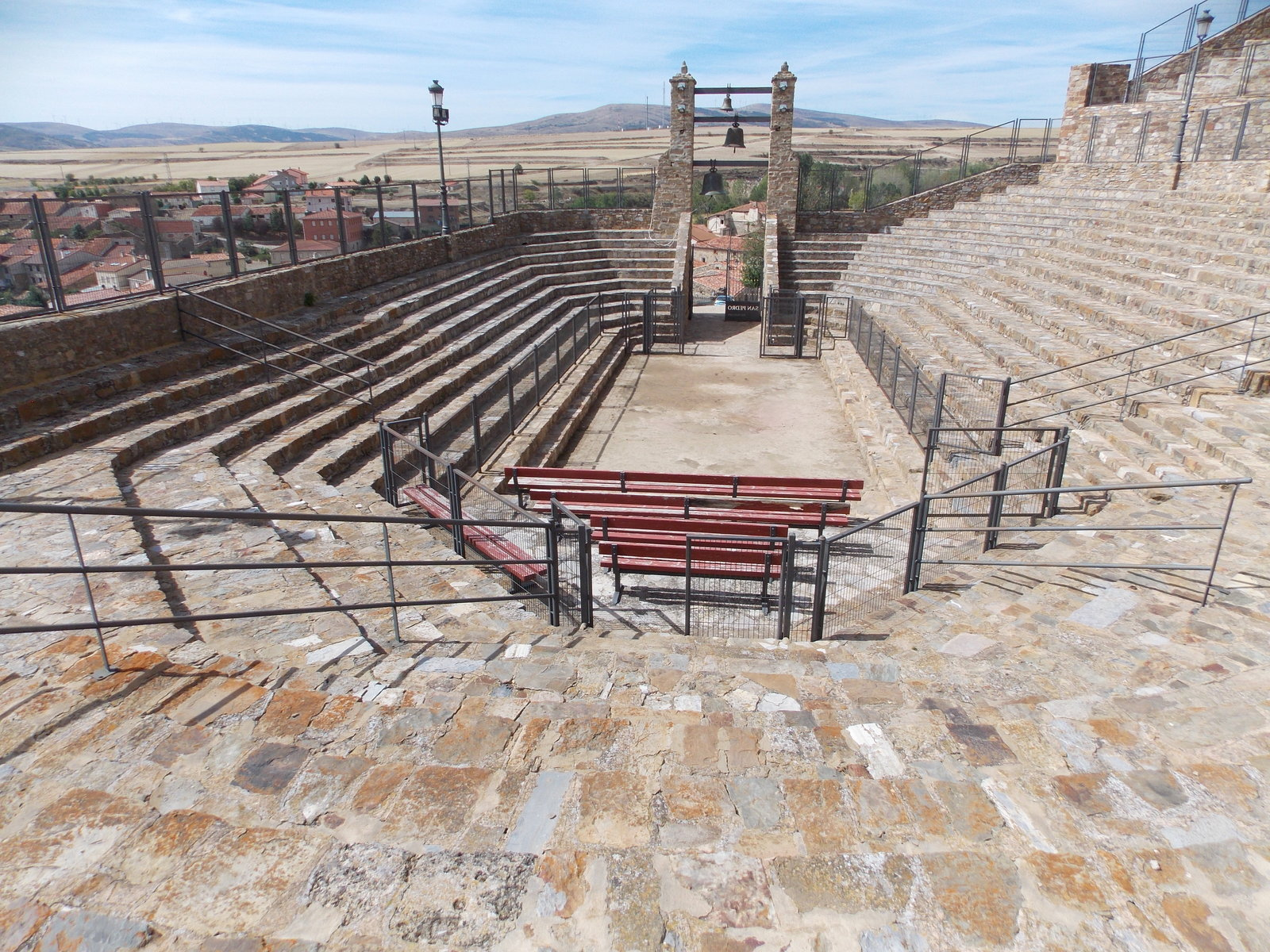
Area where firewalking takes place

There is a deposit of lead in the municipality.

== Villages ==
- Acrijos
- Armejún
- Buimanco
- Fuentebella
- Vea
- Peñazcurna
- Valdemoro de San Pedro Manrique
- Villarijo
- Matasejún
- Valdelavilla
- Santiago
- Valdenegrillos
- El Vallejo
- Taniñe
- Las Fuentes de San Pedro
- Ventosa de San Pedro
- Palacios

== Gallery ==
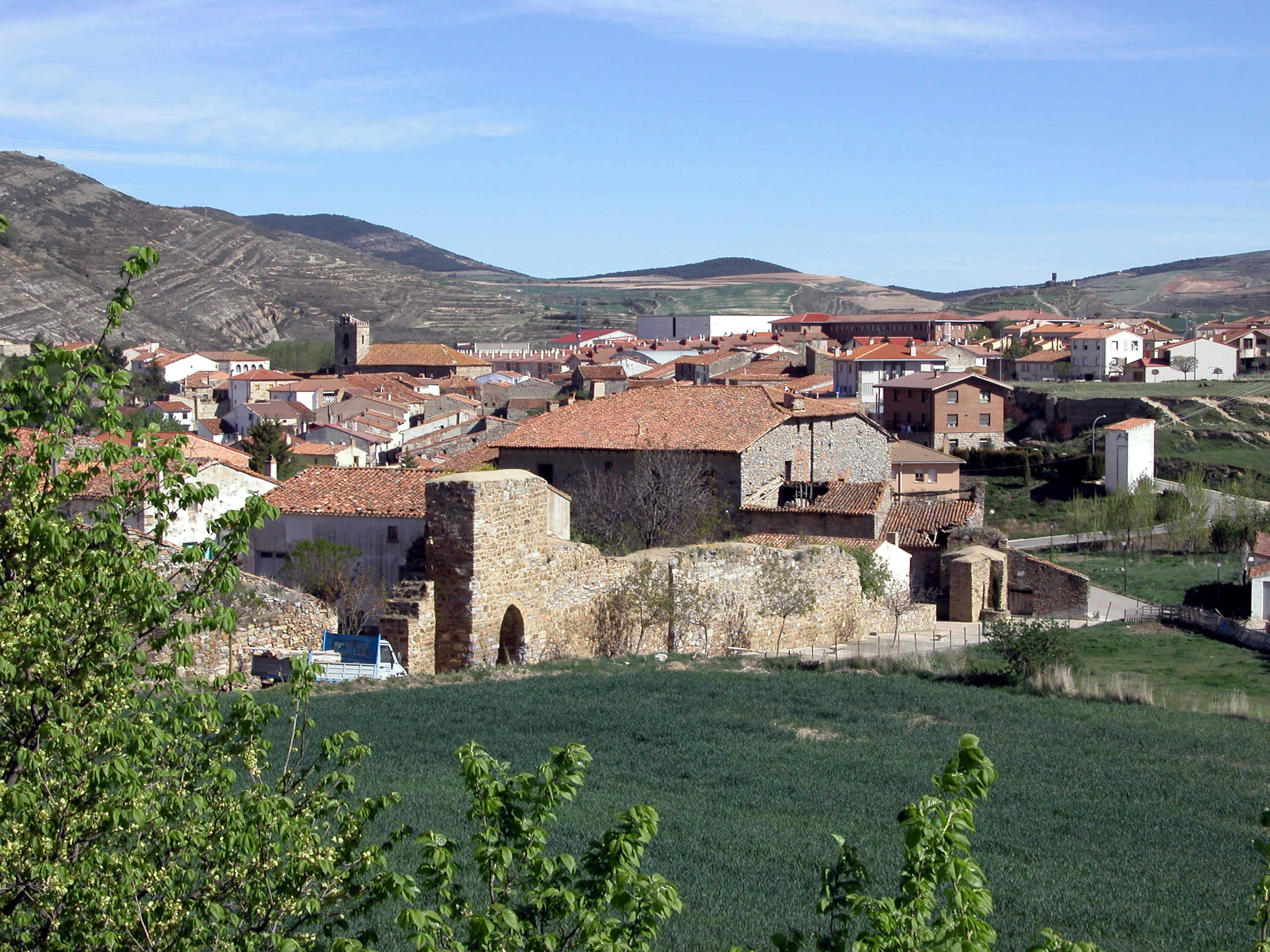
San Pedro Manrique

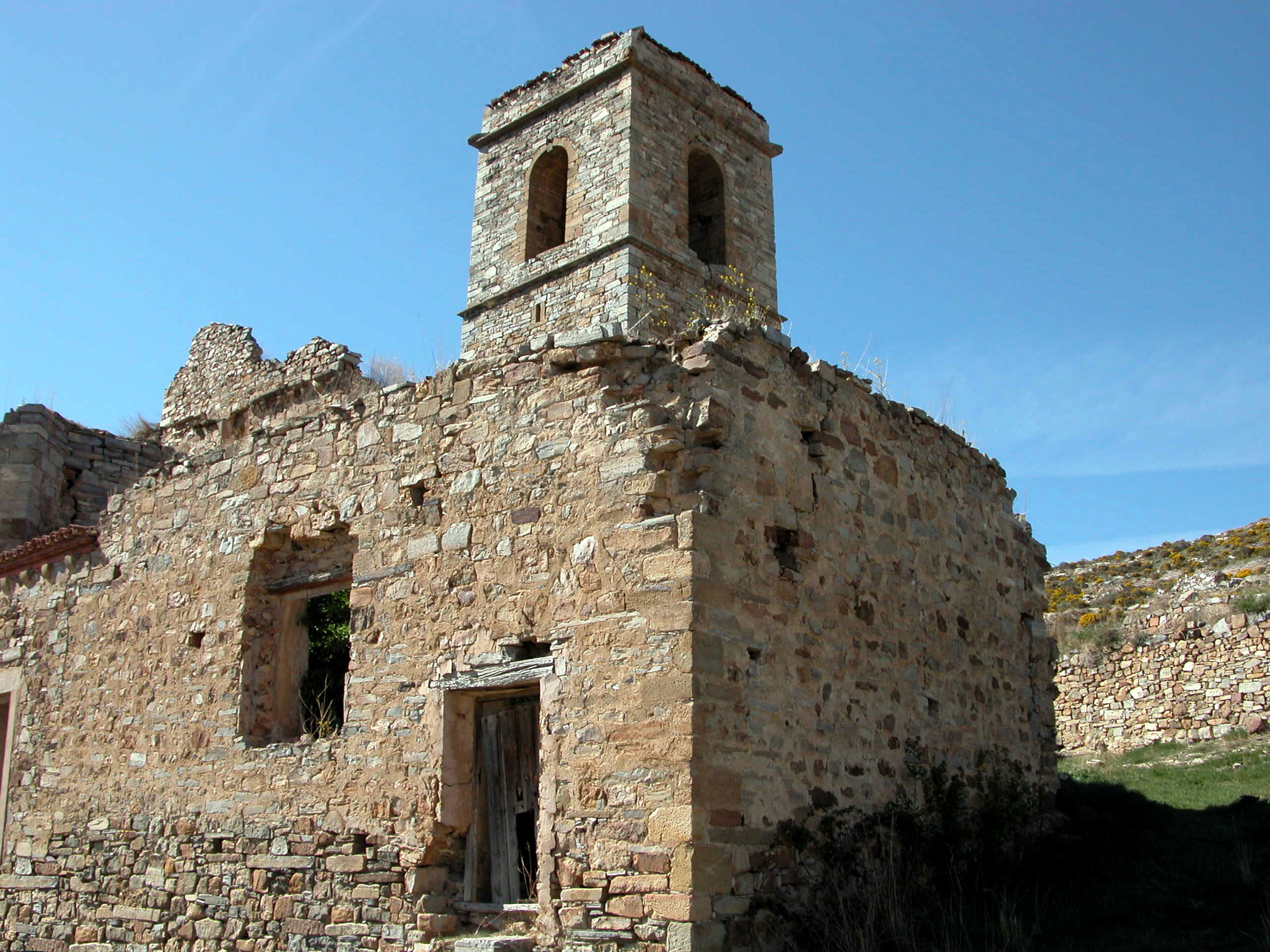
Ruins of the Romanesque church of San Miguel (13th century)

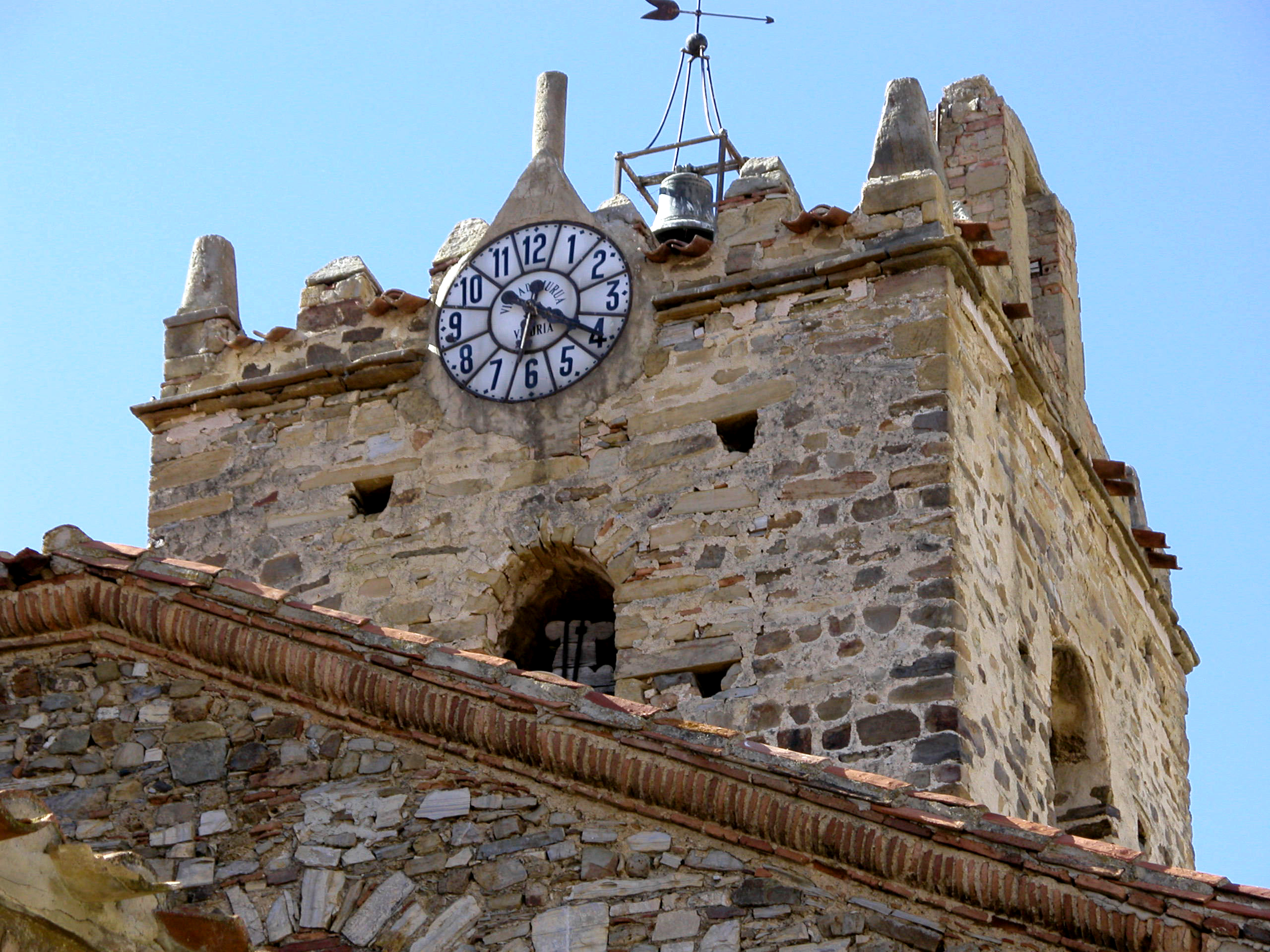
The Romanesque church of San Martín de Tours (12th century)

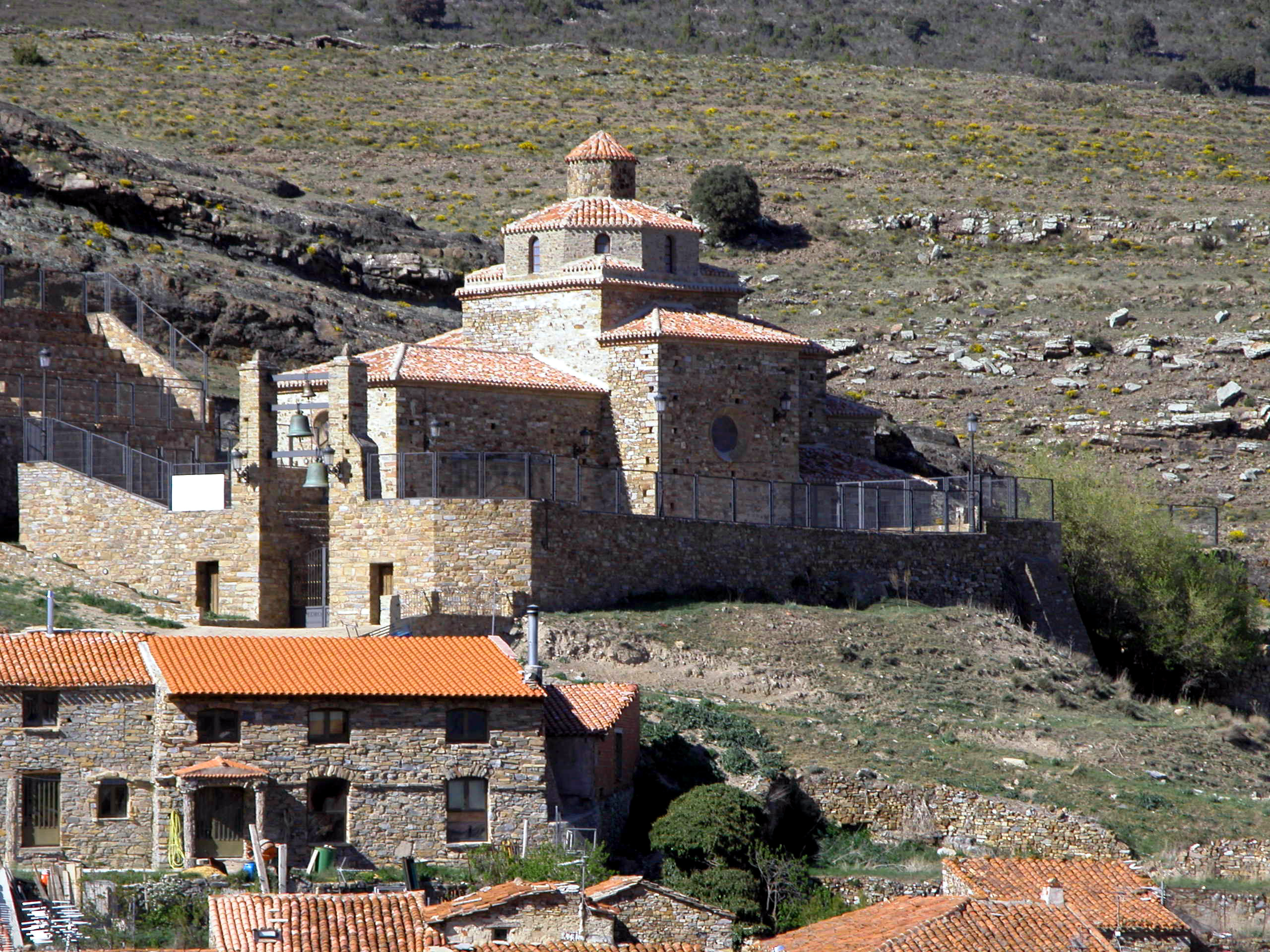
Ermita de la Virgen de la Peña (13th century)

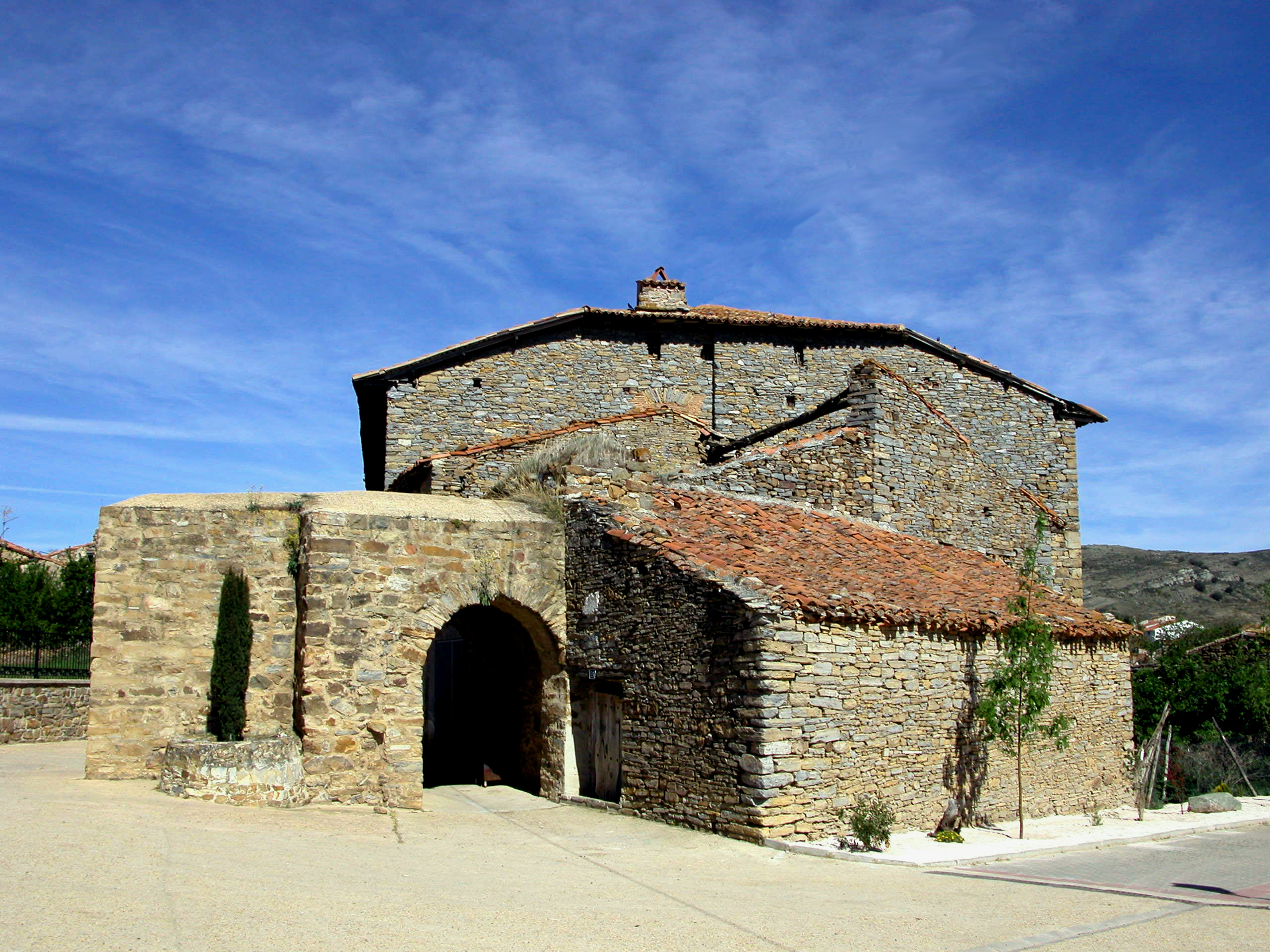
Rural architecture of the area

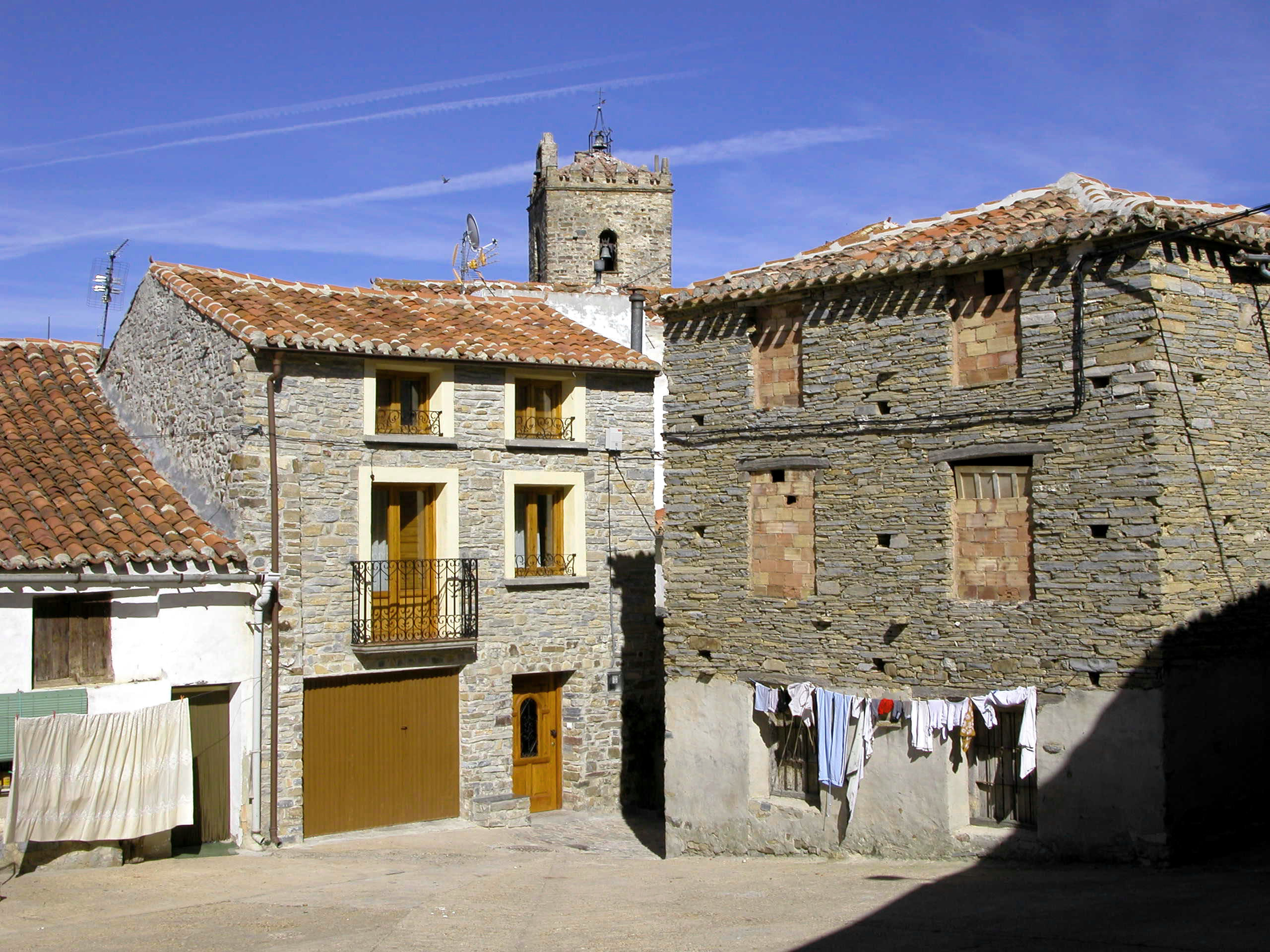
The town center

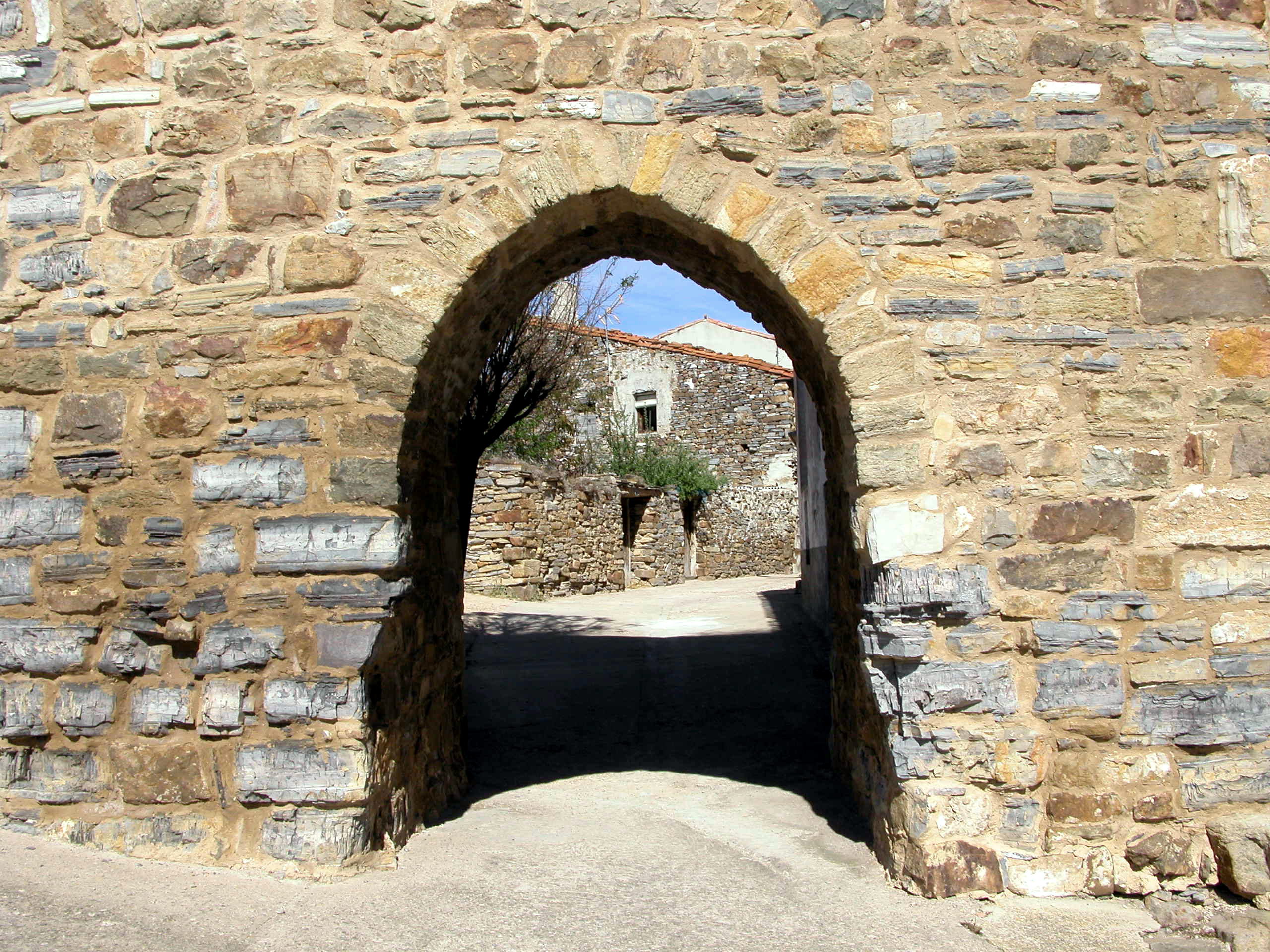
A door in the old town wall

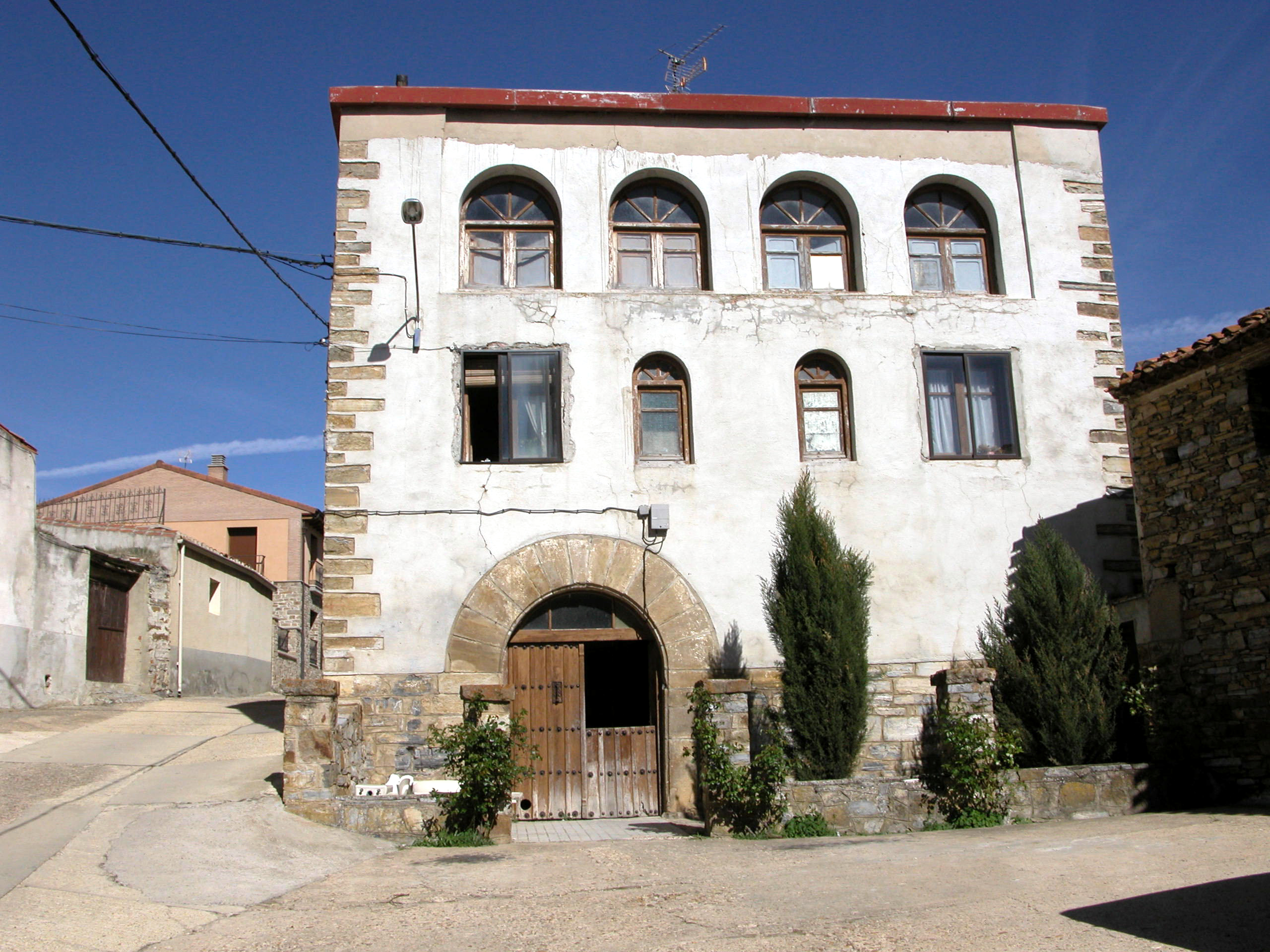
A house in the town

== History ==
Until the French Revolution the town was a constitutional municipality in the region of Castilla la Vieja, Soria. In the census of 1842, the town had were 138 homes and 550 residents.

In the 19th century, the municipality expanded to include the localities of Acrijos, Armejún, Buimanco, Fuentebella, Peñazcurna, Valdemoro de San Pedro Manrique, and Villarijo.

In the late 20th century, the municipality expanded to incorporate the localities of Matasejún, Valdelavilla, Sarnago, Valdenegrillos, El Vallejo, Taniñe, Las Fuentes de San Pedro, Ventosa de San Pedro, and Palacios.

As of 1 January 2010 the population was 639 inhabitants, 359 men and 280 women.

== Economy ==
The town is known for the spicy sausage produced there. The area is mainly reliant on livestock, agriculture, food industry (chacinera), hospitality, forestry and local services.

== Folk culture ==
It is known for its unique celebration of the Día de San Juan. During this festival, some women called "móndidas" dress in traditional costume wearing huge "cestaños" (a kind of basket filling stones for stability, and containing a roulade and several rolls), decorated with flowers and three "arbujuelos" (tree branches covered with unleavened bread colored with saffron). On the night of San Juan, known as the Paso del Fuego, a bonfire next to the shrine of the Virgen de la Peña is lit and when it has burnt to embers, the locals remove their shoes and walk barefoot on the lighted embers. It is very possible that these festivals are residue of a pagan pre-Christian holiday, and that the name of móndida comes from Maenad. The event is classified as being of ethnological interest by the Castile and Leon government.

In 2011, a scientific study of firewalking sparked global interest. In this study, the scientists showed evidence of synchronization between the heartbeats of practitioners and spectators at the firewalking ritual.

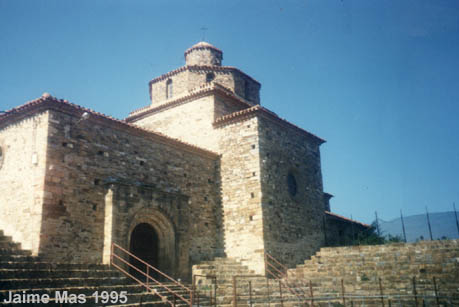
Ermita de la Virgen de la Peña.

== Landmarks ==
- Shrine of the Virgin de la Peña
- Romanesque church of San Miguel, with statues of the Apostles
