= Santa Engracia de Jaca =

- Locality
- Location within Aragon Location within Spain
- Coordinates: 42°35′50″N 0°47′5″W
- Country: Spain
- Autonomous community: Aragon
- Province: Province of Huesca
- Municipality: Puente la Reina de Jaca
- Elevation: 706 m (2,316 ft)

Population
  - Total: 91

Santa Engracia de Jaca is a locality located in the municipality of Puente la Reina de Jaca, in Huesca province, Aragon, Spain. As of 2020, it has a population of 91.

== Geography ==
Santa Engracia de Jaca is located 77 km north-northwest of Huesca.
