= Puente la Reina de Jaca =

Coordinates: 42.562°N 0.787°W

Puente la Reina de Jaca (Spanish) Puen d'a Reina de Chaca (Aragonese)
- municipality
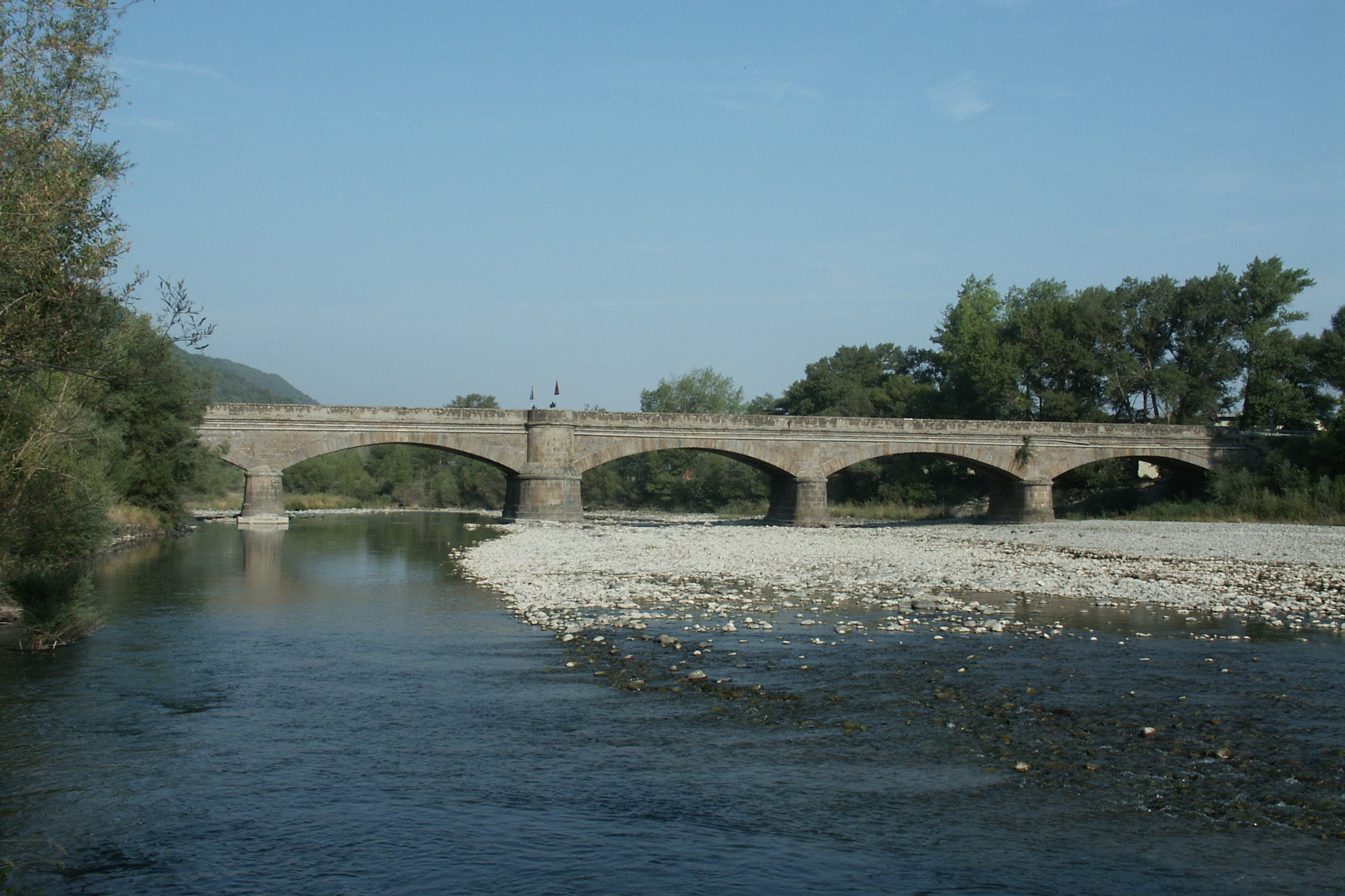
- The 14th century bridge in Puente la Reina de Jaca
- Interactive map of Puente la Reina de Jaca (Spanish)
- Country: Spain
- Autonomous community: Aragon
- Province: Huesca
- Municipality: Puente la Reina de Jaca

Area
  - Total: 47 km^{2} (18 sq mi)

Population (2025-01-01)
  - Total: 248
  - Density: 5.3/km^{2} (14/sq mi)
- Time zone: UTC+1 (CET)
  - Summer (DST): UTC+2 (CEST)

Puente la Reina de Jaca (in Aragonese: Puen d'a Reina de Chaca) is a municipality located in Jacetania, province of Huesca, Aragon, Spain. According to the 2009 census (INE), the municipality has a population of 218 inhabitants.

Puente la Reina de Jaca is situated on the bank of the river Aragón next to a bridge which gave it its name.

This region was reconquered in 833 by Galindo Aznárez I who was related to the French Carolingian court.

== Villages ==
- Santa Engracia de Jaca
- Javierregay
