= Javierregay =

- Locality
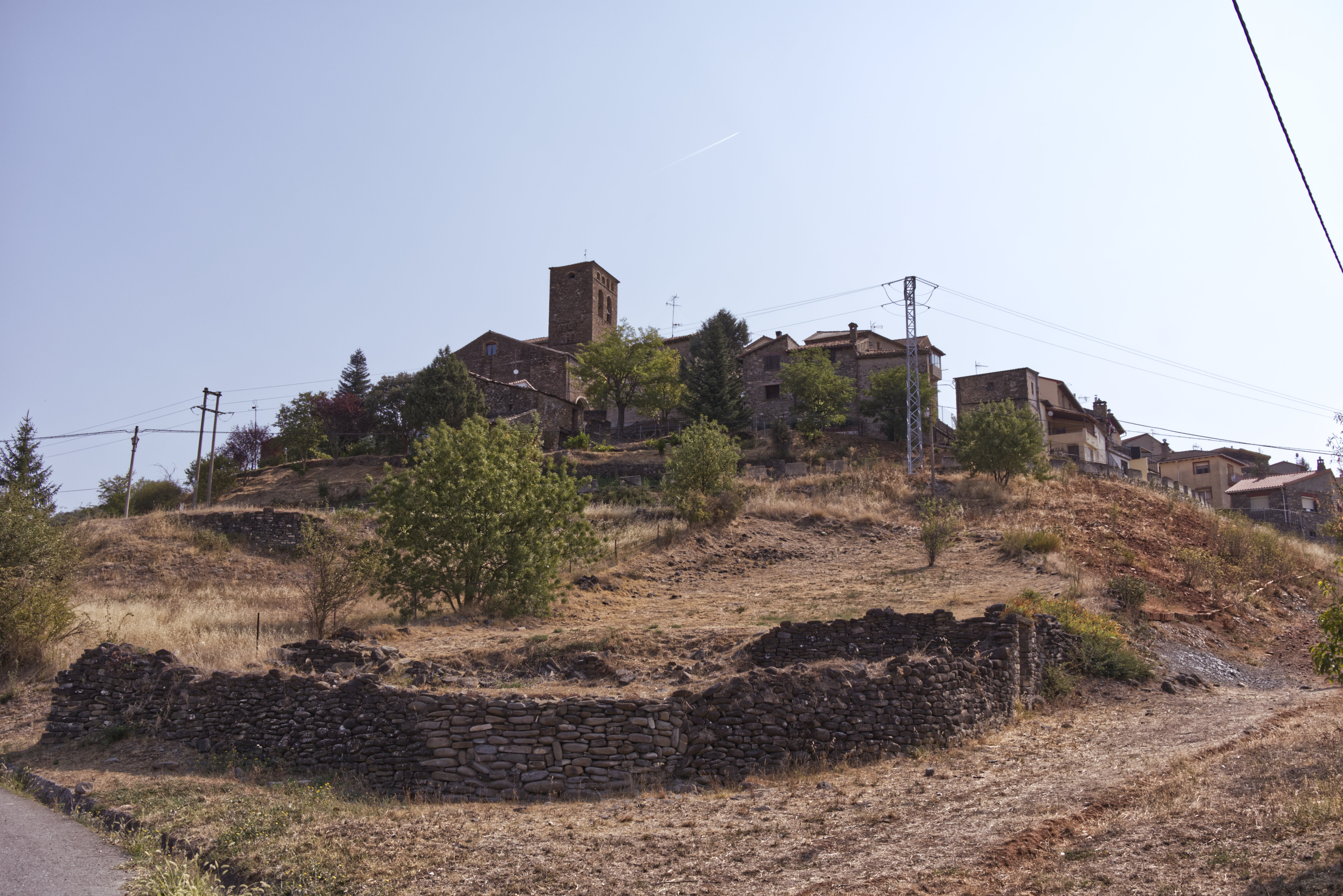

- Location within Aragon Location within Spain
- Coordinates: 42°35′16″N 0°44′1″W
- Country: Spain
- Autonomous community: Aragon
- Province: Province of Huesca
- Municipality: Puente la Reina de Jaca
- Elevation: 697 m (2,287 ft)

Population
  - Total: 89

Javierregay is a locality located in the municipality of Puente la Reina de Jaca, in Huesca province, Aragon, Spain. As of 2020, it has a population of 89.

== Geography ==
Javierregay is located 93 km (58 mi) north-northwest of Huesca.
