= Aragonese dialects =

Overview of dialects of Aragonese

Dialectal areas of Aragonese.

The Aragonese language has many regional dialects, which can be grouped by valley or larger comarca areas. The area where Aragonese is spoken has quite a rugged relief and is generally sparsely populated with many tracts and valleys pretty isolated from each other. In the literature about the language, the term dialect is ambiguous and can be used to refer to well-known valley varieties, such as cheso or ansotano. Aragonese speakers can be classified into four groups or main dialectal areas following Francho Nagore: Western, Central, Eastern, and Southern. There is a centuries-old diglossia that has favored the lack of unitary awareness among Aragonese speakers; in areas where the language has been best preserved, Aragonese speakers often use local names for their dialect.

== Classification proposals ==
=== The Four Dialects ===
The most accepted dialectal classification is the one by Francho Nagore, who classified Aragonese varieties into 4 groups:

- Western Aragonese
- Central Aragonese
- Eastern Aragonese
- Southern Aragonese

For some, these groups are considered complex dialects and their internal variations, such as Cheso or Chistabino, would be regional variants. For others, the four groups are the constituent dialects of the Aragonese language and the variants that they include would be subdialects, spoken locally or regionally.

=== Others ===
Although the Nagore classification with four dialectal areas is the most widespread, other authors have proposed alternatives. For Chusé Raúl Usón and Chabier Tomás, there would be three historical dialects that correspond more or less to the three old Pyrenean counties:

- Western Dialect: County of Aragón
- Central Dialect: County of Sobrarbe
- Eastern Dialect: County of Ribagorza

Fernando Sánchez proposed a classification that posits the existence of two great variants/dialects: Western and Eastern. These would also have more extreme subvarieties:

- Within the Western dialect: Ansotano (and in some ways, Cheso and Ayerbense), with extreme Western characteristics, related to the ancient Navarrese romance.
- Within the Eastern dialect: Ribagorzano, with many traits close to Catalan.

== Eastern Aragonese ==
The eastern area includes a large part of the historic County of Ribagorza, plus eastern parts of Sobrarbe, and has many features in common with Catalan, with increasing similarity as one moves east.

Some common features of the group are:

- Latin plosive consonants become voiced between vowels: meligo (navel), caixigo (type of oak), forau (hole).
- In participles, the voiced Latin -T- was later deleted, giving endings in -au, -iu: cantau, metiu (sung, put in).
- There is a periphrastic past perfect as in modern Catalan: él/ell ba cantá/cantar (he sang).
- Conservation of the adverbial pronoun i (< IBI).
- Compared to the other dialects, more cases of evolution of the Latin endings -TY, -CE, -CI, -DE to -u, as in Catalan: peu (foot).

== Western Aragonese ==
The Western Aragonese area corresponds to the Jacetania region, plus part of Alto Gállego and a few towns in Cinco Villas. Western dialects include Ansó Aragonese, Hecho Aragonese, Aragüés Aragonese, and Aísa Aragonese.

Common features:

- Latin plosive consonants are voiced between vowels, but with exceptions, such as gramito or espata. These exceptions might be related to the Gascon dialect.
- Participles, have endings in -au, -iu.
- The 1st and 2nd person plural pronouns are nos and bos.
- Dative pronouns: li, lis.
- Adverbial pronoun bi (< IBI), equivalent to French y, Catalan hi, etc.

== Southern Aragonese ==
Southern dialects include Nevalese. They are the ones more influenced by the Spanish language, and in recent times most of them have lost all but a few of their Aragonese features, merging with the Spanish dialects spoken to the south of the area.

== Central Aragonese ==
Corresponds to part of Alto Gállego and western parts of Sobrarbe. Features:

- Some instances of -ia- diphthong from Latin short E: fiasta (celebration).
- Latin intervocalic stops remain voiceless much more often than in other dialects: capeza (head), saper (to know), lupo (wolf), ayutar (to help).
- This conservation of voiceless stops leads to participles in -ato, -ito.
- Voicing of voiceless stops after liquid consonant: -MP- > -mb-; -NT- > -nd-; -NK- > -ng-; -LT- > -ld-; -RT- > -rd-; -LP- > -lb-; -RK- > -rg-. These rules apply variably for different words and towns.
- In some towns, definite articles ro, ra, ros, ras instead of the general Aragonese o, a, os, as.

== Current Classification of Regional Dialects ==
Western Block:

- Ansotano from Ansó Valley
- Cheso from Hecho Valley
- Aragüesino from Aragüés and Jasa
- Aisino from Aísa Valley
- Jaqués from Jaca

Central Block:

- Central Western Aragonese
  - Tensino from Tena Valley
    - Panticuto from Panticosa
  - Biescas land Aragonese
  - Acumuer Valley Aragonese
  - Serrablés from Serrablo
  - Ballibasa Aragonese from Yebra de Basa
  - Sobrepuerto Aragonese
- Central Eastern Aragonese
  - Fiscal Aragonese
  - Bergotés from Broto Valley
  - Vió Valley Aragonese
  - Puértolas Valley Aragonese
  - Tella Valley Aragonese
  - Belsetano from Bielsa
  - Sierra Ferrera Aragonese

Eastern Block:

- Chistabino from Gistau Valley
- Fovano from La Fueva Valley
- Ribagorzano Aragonese from the old County of Ribagorza
  - Altorribagorzano or Benasqués or Patués from Benasque Valley
  - Mediorribagorzano or Campo dialect
  - Bajorribagorzano
    - Grausino from Graus
    - Estadillano from Estadilla
    - Foncense from Fonz

Southern Block:

- Ayerbense from Ayerbe
- Somontanés Aragonese from Somontano
  - Navalés from Naval
- Aragonese from Old Sobrarbe

Transition Dialects

- Aragonese Spanish

=== Valleys and Somontano ===
There are different degrees of similarities between variants:

==== Axial Pyrenees Valleys ====
The topography in the form of well-separated valleys has caused the Aragonese language to have evolved into a dialect or locally spoken language in each valley:

Valley	Aragonese Variant
Ansó	Ansotano
Hecho Valley	Cheso
Aragüés and Jasa	Aragüesino
Aísa	Aisino
Tena Valley	Tensino
Broto Valley	Bergotés
Ballibió	Aragonese of Ballibió
Bielsa	Belsetano
Gistaín Valley	Chistabino
Benasque Valley	Benasqués

=== Western and Eastern Poles ===
There is a distribution of differences between the East and the West, with boundaries that do not coincide, but some that appear mainly from Broto and Cotefablo to the Ribagorza and further, and others that are seen mainly from Tena and Cotefablo to Navarre.

== See also ==
- Judaeo-Aragonese
