= Ana Tena =

Ana Tena Puy
- Born: 1966 (age 59–60) Panillo, Huesca province, Aragón, Spain
- Occupation: Poet
- Literary movement: Aragonese language literature

Ana Tena Puy (born 1966) is an Aragonese writer in Ribagorçan Aragonese.

== Life ==
She was born in Panillo, Huesca province, Aragón, Spain.

In 2009, she won Chusé Coarasa, for short stories written in Aragonese. She is a member of Consello d'a Fabla Aragonesa and a founding member of the Academia de l'Aragonés. In her works, she mixes her personal introspection and social interests.

== Books ==
- Ta óne im Publicazions d'o Consello d'a Fabla Aragonesa, 1997 translated to French "Où allons-nous ?", éditions de la ramonda, 2017
- Tornasols (1997)
- Bardo que alenta, Publicazions d'o Consello d'a Fabla Aragonesa, 1998, ISBN 9788486036713
- La bollonera d’un alma (2001)
- Más t’allá (2002)
- Cuentos pa biladas sin suenio Publicazions d'o Consello d'a Fabla Aragonesa, 2001, ISBN 9788486036904
- L’ombre la santeta, (2005) premio Billa de Sietemo
- Como minglanas, Publicazions d'o Consello d'a Fabla Aragonesa, 2008, ISBN 9788495997272
- Adónde vamos, Gara D'Edizions, 2009, ISBN 9788480944014
