= Aragüés Aragonese =

Dialect of Aragonese

- Aragüesino
- Native to: Aragon, Spain
- Region: Aísa, Esposa, Sinués
- Language family: Indo-European: Italic; Latino-Faliscan; Latinic; Romance; Italo-Western; Western; (unclassified); Pyrenean–Mozarabic?; Navarro-Aragonese; Aragonese; Western; Aragüés Aragonese

Official status
- Recognised minority language in: Spain

Language codes
- ISO 639-3: –
- Glottolog: None

Aragüés Aragonese is the Aragonese variety spoken in Aragüés and Jasa. It is very similar to Cheso, and better preserved than Aísa Aragonese.

== Morphology ==
- Define article system is lo, la, los, las.
- The endings in indefinite past are -o as in Tensinian Aragonese: pagomos, (paguemos), cantoz, (cantez). In the third person in plural we have -oron just in the first conjugation: cantoron, but in the 2nd and in the 3rd person we have -ieron or -io(ro)n: salieron, partioron, riyeron, faborezión.
- In irregular verbs with -i in present, we find this -i in yo foi but not in yo bó.
- There are, as in Sobrarbe "strong perfects": fízon, trújon.

== Lexicon ==
They are words different from those from Aísa Aragonese (Estarrún Valley).

- tabuzo, charga (barza in the Estarrún Valley), argüella, betiello.

== See also ==
- Aragonese dialects
