= Aragues =

Aragues or Aragüés may refer to

- Aragüés del Puerto, a municipality in Huesca, Aragon, Spain
- Aragüés Aragonese, the Aragonese variety spoken in Aragüés and Jasa
- Juan de Aragüés (c.1710–1793), a Spanish composer
- Victoria María Aragüés Gadea (1943 – 2023), a Spanish magician and dancer better known as Sticky Vicky
