= Aisinian Aragonese =

Dialect of Aragonese

Aísa Aragonese
- Aisino
- Native to: Aragon, Spain
- Region: Aísa, Esposa, Sinués
- Language family: Indo-European: Italic; Latino-Faliscan; Latinic; Romance; Italo-Western; Western; (unclassified); Pyrenean–Mozarabic?; Navarro-Aragonese; Aragonese; Western; Aísa Aragonese

Official status
- Recognised minority language in: Spain

Language codes
- ISO 639-3: –
- Glottolog: None

Aisa Aragonese is a dialect of Aragonese language spoken in Aísa Valley. It is very similar to Aragüés Aragonese and Jaca Aragonese.

== Article ==
The article is like in General Aragonese :o, a, os, as. As in Somontano de Ayerbe, it is contracted with preposition: d'o, d'a, n'o, n'a, t'o, t'a.

== See also ==
- Aragonese dialects
