= Navalese dialect =

Dialect of Aragonese

Navalese
- Nabalés
- Native to: Aragon, Spain
- Region: Somontano de Barbastro, El Grado, Naval, Hoz y Costean, and Coscojuela de Fantova
- Language family: Indo-European: Italic; Latino-Faliscan; Latinic; Romance; Italo-Western; Western; (unclassified); Pyrenean–Mozarabic?; Navarro-Aragonese; Aragonese; Southern; Navalese

Language codes
- ISO 639-3: –
- Glottolog: None

Navalese is a variant of Southern Aragonese. The main characteristic of this local speech is the conservation of the articles system lo, la, los, las (that we can find in Hecho and Aragüés Aragonese, that some authors believe is an archaism), instead of the general system o, a, os, as.

Naval is a place located in El Grado, in the county of Somontano de Barbastro.

== See also ==
- Aragonese dialects

== Sources ==
- Chesús de Mostolay EL ARAGONÉS EN EL SOMONTANO DE BARBASTRO: GLOSARIO DE VOCES Y EXPRESIONES.
- Chusé Inazio Navarro García SOBRE LA SUFIJACIÓN APRECIATIVA EN A LUECA, DE JUANA COSCUJUELA
