= Timeline of Zaragoza =

The following is a timeline of the history of the city of Zaragoza, Spain.

== Prior to 20th century ==
- 25 BCE – Town becomes a Roman colony, named Caesaraugusta.
- 452 CE – Suebi in power.
- 476 CE – Visigoths in power.
- 712 – Moors in power. Beginning of Islamic period in the town.
- 778 – Forces of Charlemagne attempt to take Saragossa; inspires French poem The Song of Roland.
- 11th century – Aljafería palace built.
- 1018 – Taifa of Zaragoza established.
- 1118 – Alfonso I of Aragon in power. End of Islamic period in the town.
- 1318 – Roman Catholic Archdiocese of Zaragoza established.
- 1343 – Santa Fe Abbey founded (approximate date).
- 1376 – La Seo Cathedral built.
- 1447 – Puente de Piedra (bridge) built.
- 1469 – Royal court relocated from Saragossa to Castile.
- 1474 – University founded.
- 1475 – Printing press in use.
- 1512 – Torre Nueva (clocktower) built.
- 1514 – Church of Santa Engracia de Zaragoza built.
- 1754 – Basilica of Our Lady of the Pillar built.
- 1808 – June–August: Siege of Saragossa by French forces.
- 1809 – Siege of Saragossa by French forces.
- 1857 – Population: 63,399.
- 1892 – Leaning Tower of Zaragoza demolished.
- 1897 – Population: 98,188.

== 20th century ==
- 1902 – Electric tram begins operating.
- 1910 – Banco Zaragozano founded.
- 1916 – Iberia SC (football club) formed.
- 1917 – February: Labor strike.
- 1920 – Population: 141,350.
- 1923 – Estadio Torrero (stadium) opens.
- 1923 – Catholic bishop Juan Soldevila y Romero assassinated.
- 1925 – Zaragoza CD (football club) formed.
- 1927 – General Military Academy reestablished.
- 1932 – Real Zaragoza football team formed.
- 1936 – Diario de Aragón newspaper begins publication.
- 1940 – Population: 238,601.
- 1947 – Balay in business.
- 1954 – Zaragoza Air Station built near city.
- 1957 – La Romareda stadium opens.
- 1960 – Population: 326,316.
- 1970 – Population: 479,845.
- 1979 – 12 July: Hotel Corona de Aragón fire.
- 1981 – CB Zaragoza basketball team formed.
- 1987 – 11 December: Zaragoza barracks bombing.
- 1990
  - December: Clinic of Zaragoza radiotherapy accident.
  - El Periódico de Aragón newspaper begins publication.
- 1991 – Population: 622,371.

== 21st century ==
- 2003
  - Zaragoza-Delicias railway station opens; Madrid–Barcelona high-speed rail line begins operating.
  - Juan Alberto Belloch becomes mayor.
- 2008 – Expo 2008 held; Water Tower built.
- 2011
  - Zaragoza tram Line 1 begins operating.
  - Arredol news site begins publication.

== See also ==
- Zaragoza history
- History of Zaragoza
- List of mayors of Zaragoza
- List of cities in Aragon

== Bibliography ==
- David Brewster, ed. (1830). "Sargossa". Edinburgh Encyclopædia. Edinburgh: William Blackwood.
- "Spain: Saragossa", Cities and Principal Towns of the World, Cabinet Cyclopaedia, London: Longman, Rees, Orme, Brown, & Green, 1830, OCLC 2665202
- Charles Knight, ed. (1867). "Zaragoza". Geography. English Cyclopaedia. Vol. 4. London: Bradbury, Evans, & Co. hdl:2027/nyp.33433000064810.
- "Saragossa". Spain and Portugal (3rd ed.). Leipsic: Karl Baedeker. 1908. OCLC 1581249.
- Albert F. Calvert (1908). "Zaragoza". Valladolid, Oviedo, Segovia, Zamora, Avil, & Zaragoza; an Historical & Descriptive Account. Spanish series. London: John Lane. hdl:2027/mdp.39015004743590.
- "Saragossa (city)" . Encyclopædia Britannica. Vol. 24 (11th ed.). 1910. pp. 203–204.
- Colum Hourihane, ed. (2012). "Saragossa". Grove Encyclopedia of Medieval Art and Architecture. Oxford University Press. p. 497+. ISBN 978-0-19-539536-5.
