= Chusé Raúl Usón =

Spanish publisher and writer

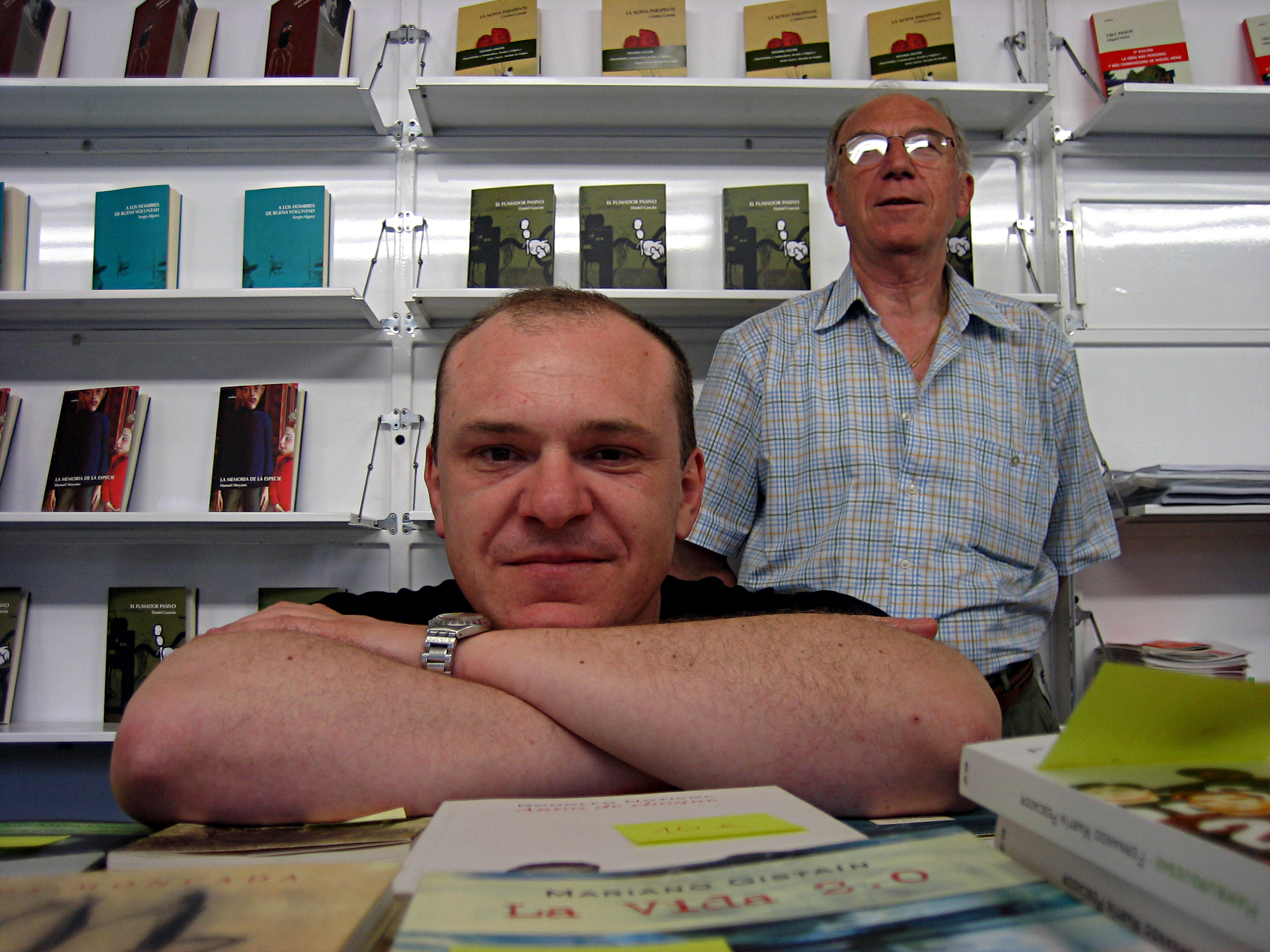
Chusé Raúl Usón at the Zaragosa book fair in 2006

Chusé Raúl Usón Serrano (Jusep Raül Uson in SLA orthography), born in 1966 in Zaragoza, is a publisher and a Spanish writer in the Aragonese language.
