= Rosario Ustáriz Borra =

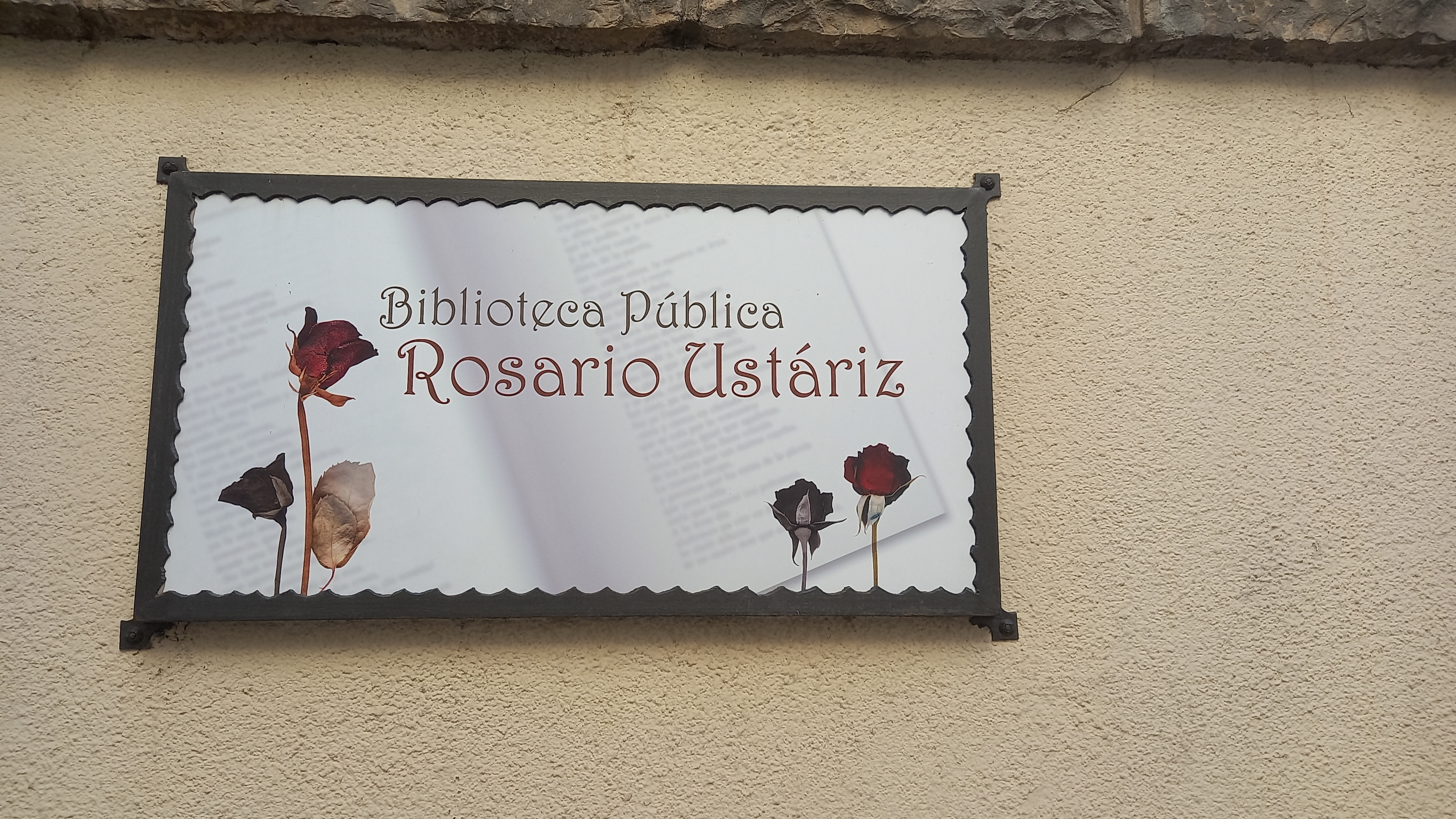
- Plaque at the Hecho library
- Born: 1927 Valle de Hecho, Huesca province, Aragón, Spain
- Died: August 28th 2009 Jaca, Huesca province, Aragón, Spain
- Occupation: Poet
- Literary movement: Aragonese language literature

Rosario Ustáriz reciting her Aragonese poem honoring Jesus and Mary.

Rosario Ustáriz singing in Spanish about princess Delgadina, imprisoned by his father, the king, who is enamored of her.

Rosario Ustáriz Borra (Hecho, 1927 – Jaca, August 28, 2009) was a writer and poet who wrote in the Aragonese language, born in the Pyrenean village of Hecho (currently, part of the municipality known as Valle de Hecho), in the Province of Huesca (northern Spain), and a native speaker to the Aragonese Cheso dialect (local to the referred valley, and one of the few extant varieties of western Aragonese), in which she developed the whole of her work. As one of the few native speakers of modern Aragonese that have taken some part in its divulgation and conservation, Ustáriz is well appreciated among the community of scholars and supportants of this Pyrenean vernacular, having some of her works been published.

Her first poetic work was the poem Remerando a Pedro que se'n fue chugando («Remembering Pedro, whom passed while playing») written in 1982, that won the Onso d'Oro (Golden Bear) prize of the literary competition convened by the Valle de Hecho Council, later winning two other Onsos d'Oro, in 1983 and 1984. In her works she used to describe her own experiences and used to deal on Valle de Hecho's landscapes, people and traditions. In 2006, a compilation of her poems was published, titled Miquetas de l'alma (literally «Small Pieces from the Soul»). She was an honour member of Academia de l'Aragonés since November 2007. She died on August 28, 2009, in Jaca (Huesca), aged 82.

Hecho's municipal library, first opened in 2007, was named after her.

== See also ==
- Aragonese language
- Cheso dialect
