= Perarrúa =

Coordinates: 42°16′0″N 0°21′0″E

Perarrúa (Spanish) Perarruga (Ribagorçan) Perarruga (Aragonese)
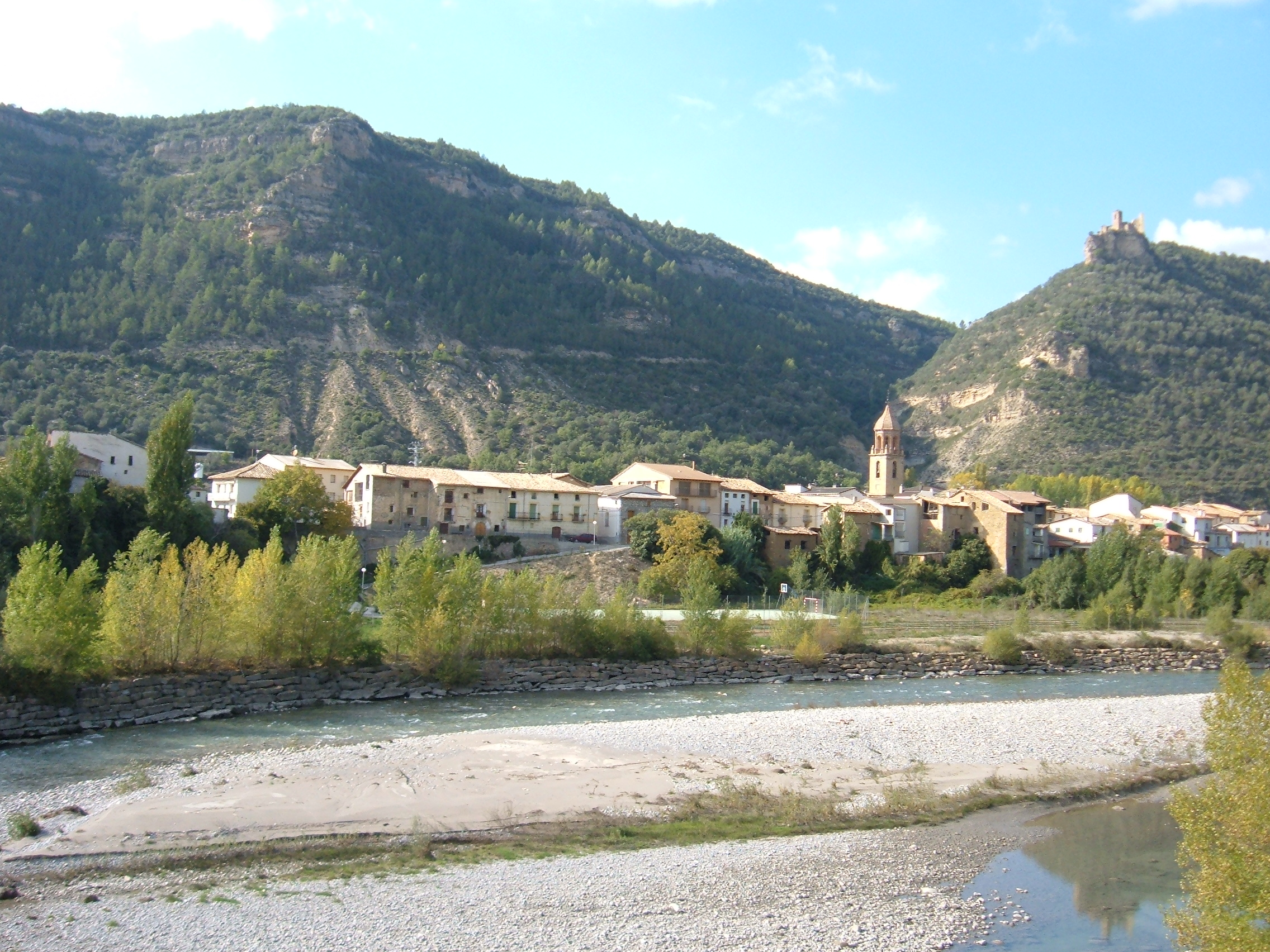
- View of Perarrúa

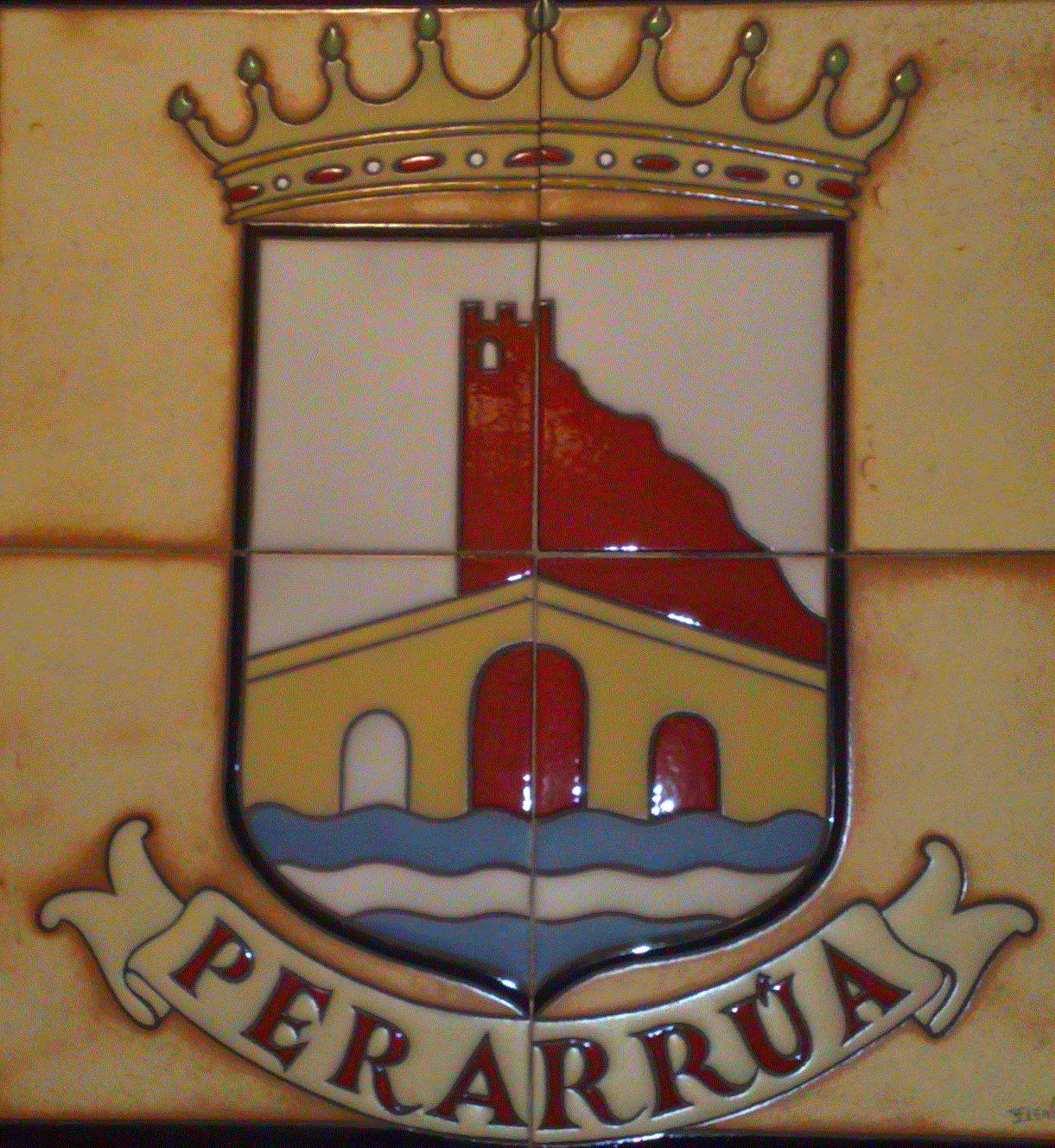
- Coat of arms
- Interactive map of Perarrúa (Spanish)
- Country: Spain
- Autonomous community: Aragon
- Province: Huesca
- Municipality: Perarrúa/Perarrua

Area
  - Total: 29 km^{2} (11 sq mi)

Population (2025-01-01)
  - Total: 116
  - Density: 4.0/km^{2} (10/sq mi)
- Time zone: UTC+1 (CET)
  - Summer (DST): UTC+2 (CEST)

Perarrúa (Spanish: [peɾaˈru.a]), in Ribagorçan and Aragonese: Perarruga (locally [peɾaˈru.a]; Aragonese: Perarruga) is a municipality located in the province of Huesca, Aragon, Spain. According to the 2004 census (INE), the municipality has a population of 123 inhabitants.

== See also ==
- List of municipalities in Huesca
