= La Jacetania =

- Comarca
- Coordinates: 42°36′N 0°36′W
- Country: Spain
- Autonomous community: Aragon
- Province: Huesca and Zaragoza
- Capital: Jaca

Area
  - Total: 1,857.9 km^{2} (717.3 sq mi)

Population
  - Total: 17,825
  - Density: 9.5942/km^{2} (24.849/sq mi)
- Time zone: UTC+1 (CET)
  - Summer (DST): UTC+2 (CEST)
- Largest municipality: Jaca

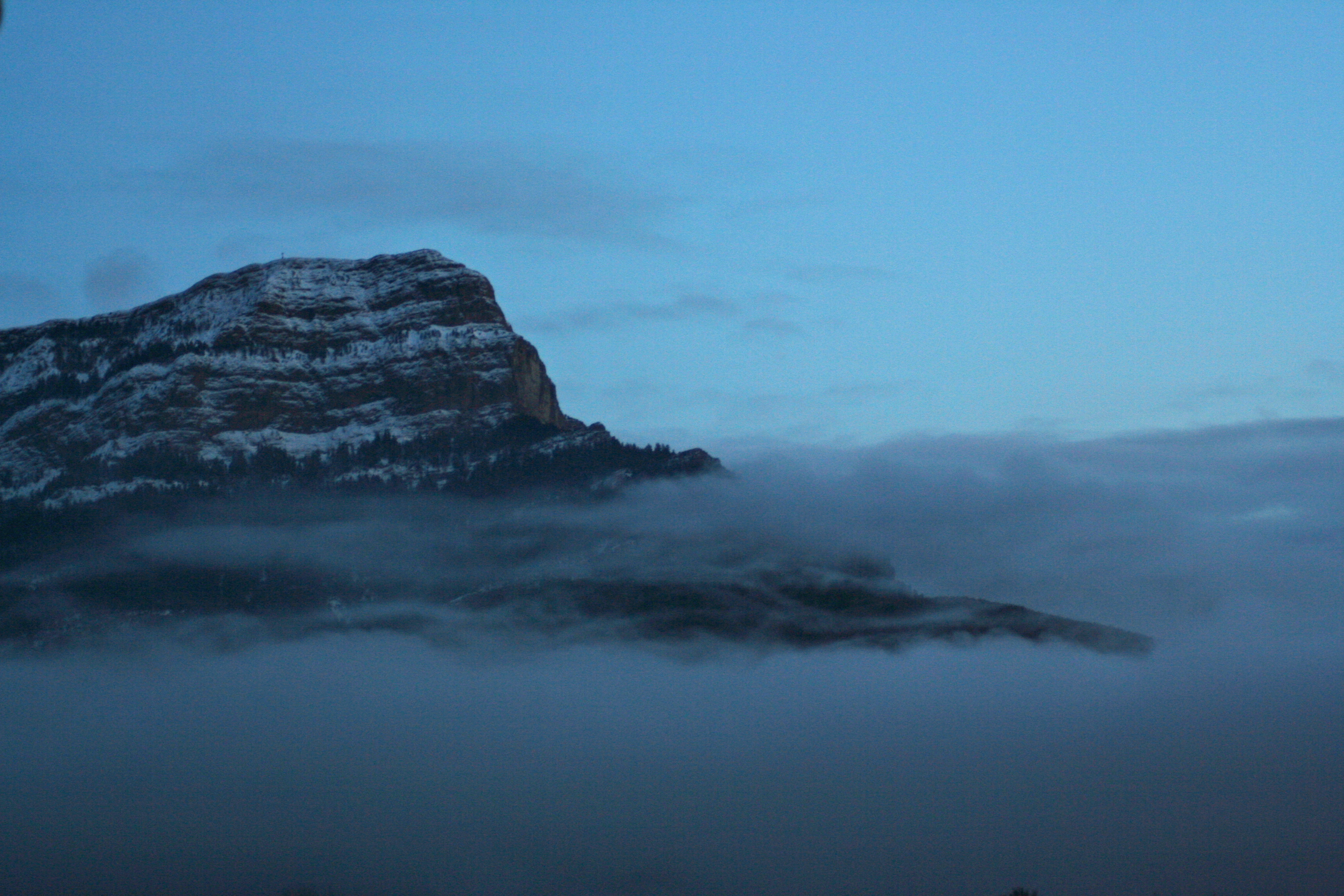
Penya Uruel or Peña Oroel above the mist

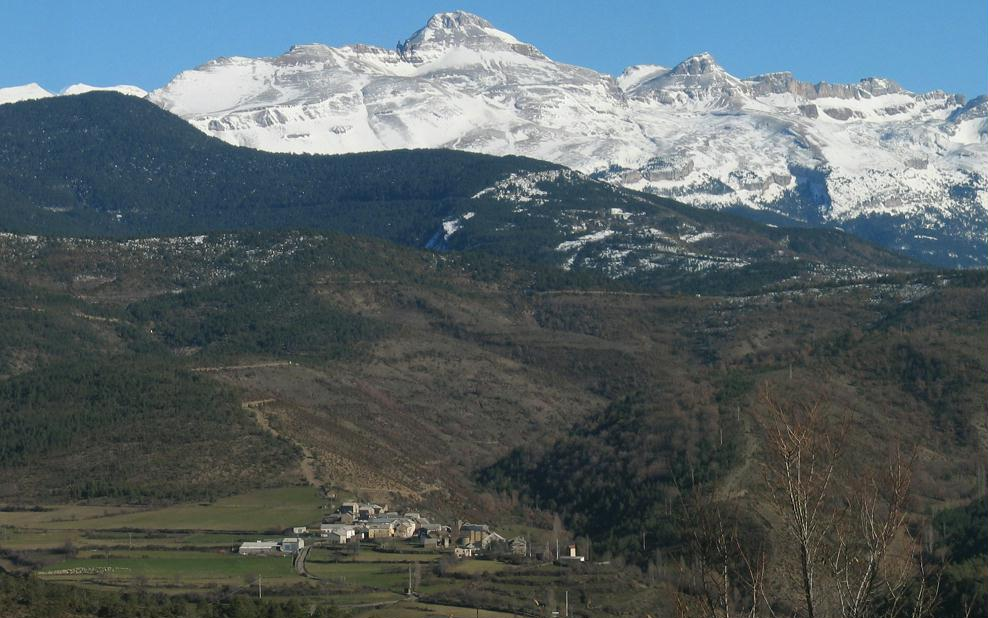
Esposa seen from Sinués.

La Jacetania (Aragonese: A Chacetania; French: Jacétanie) is a comarca in northern Aragon, Spain. It is located in the northwestern corner of the Huesca and Zaragoza provinces. The administrative capital is Jaca, which with a population of 13,374 is the largest town in the comarca. The area is famous for its ski resorts.

Jacetania is bordered by France to the north and Navarre to the west. Most of its territory is mountainous, with the ranges of the Pyrenees and Pre-Pyrenees covering most of its area. The name of the comarca originates in the ancient Iberian tribe of the Iacetani (Latin: Iaccetani).

This comarca was the birthplace of the historic County of Aragon.

== Municipal terms ==
The traditional names of the towns, when different from the official name, are in brackets.

- Aísa
  - Candanchú
  - Esposa
  - Sinués
- Ansó
- Aragüés del Puerto (Aragüés de lo Puerto)
- Artieda
- Ascara
- Bailo
- Borau
- Canal de Berdún (A Canal de Berdún)
- Canfranc
  - Canfranc Estación
- Castiello de Jaca (Castiello de Chaca)
  - Aratorés
- Fago
- Jaca (Chaca)
- Jasa (Chasa)
- Mianos (Mians)
- Puente la Reina de Jaca (Puent d'a Reina de Chaca)
- Salvatierra de Esca (Salvatierra d'Esca)
- Santa Cilia
- Santa Cruz de la Serós (Santa Cruz d'as Serors)
- Sigüés
- Valle de Hecho (Val d'Echo)
- Villanúa (Villanuga)

== See also ==
- County of Aragon
- Pyrenees
