= Benasquese dialect =

Dialect of Aragonese

Benasquese
- benasqués, patués
- Native to: Aragon, Spain
- Region: Ribagorza, Campo, Estadilla, Graus
- Native speakers: (undated figure of 1,000–2,000)
- Language family: Indo-European: Italic; Latino-Faliscan; Latinic; Romance; Italo-Western; Western; (unclassified); Pyrenean–Mozarabic?; Navarro-Aragonese; Aragonese; Eastern; Aragonese Ribagorçan; Benasquese

Official status
- Recognised minority language in: Spain

Language codes
- ISO 639-3: –
- Glottolog: None

Benasquese (autonym: benasqués), often called patués by its speakers, is the native Romance linguistic variety of the Benasque Valley, in the province of Huesca, Aragon region, Spain.

Usually regarded as an Aragonese dialect (a particular variety of Ribagorçan, transitional between Catalan, Gascon and Aragonese), it has also been considered an extreme North-Western Catalan dialect in the past by a few linguists, and more recently, a language in its own right. Benasquese itself is often divided into two subdialects, Upper Benasquese and Lower Benasquese.

Although still vigorously spoken (when compared with other Aragonese varieties) by some 1,000 to 2,000 speakers, Benasquese is also in fast decline.
