= Ansó Aragonese =

Dialect of Aragonese

- Ansotano
- Native to: Aragon, Spain
- Region: Ansó Valley
- Language family: Indo-European: Italic; Latino-Faliscan; Latinic; Romance; Italo-Western; Western; (disputed); Pyrenean–Mozarabic?; Navarro-Aragonese; Aragonese; Western; Ansó Aragonese
- Writing system: Latin script

Language codes
- ISO 639-3: –
- Glottolog: None

Ansó Aragonese is a variety of Western Aragonese spoken in Ansó Valley, included Ansó, Biniés and Fago.

== Phonetics ==
Final -r is not pronounced in Ansó but it's still pronounced in Fago.

== Morphology ==
The most documented article system in Ansó Aragonese is o, a, os, as but the old system with lo, la, los, las is also used in certain contexts:

- fendo lo fatuo
- le'n diremos a la ermana

The verb haver (to have) as impersonal in general Aragonese (b)i ha, (b)i heva is replaced by the verb estar (to be):

- bi'stá augua.
- bi'stava augua.

There is a first-person personal ending-i in some tenses:

- yo fevai.
- yo tenevai.

It is one of the few Aragonese varieties that still have this characteristic (it is believed that feve, teneve in Gistaín Aragonese is an evolution of this AI > e) that may also be found in the Spanish spoken in Embún, Salvatierra de Esca and Uncastillo and in the Aragonese language spoken in some villages in the North of the Cinco Villas such as Longás and Fuencalderas.

== See also ==
- Aragonese dialects
