= Ascara =

Ascara Scar
- Town
- Etymology: Spanish: Ascara ("scar")
- Location of Ascara in Spain
- Coordinates: 42.566667°N .65°W
- Country: Spain
- Established: 1104

Area
  - Total: 8.32 ha (20.6 acres)
- Elevation: 732 m (2,402 ft)

Population (2013)
  - Total: 57
  - Density: 690/km^{2} (1,800/sq mi)
- Time zone: UTC+01:00 (CET)
- Postal code: 22715

Ascara is a Spanish town that is in the municipality of Jaca, La Jacetania, Province of Huesca, Aragon. According to the 2013 census there are 57 inhabitants. It sits a bit east of the Prime meridian. The first mention of the village is in 1027. It belonged to the Monastery of San Adrian de Sasabe. It was included in the municipality of Abay from 1844 to 1963, when it joined the Jaca municipality. There are a few festivals and traditions throughout the year, all related to religion.

== Architecture ==
The parish church was built in the 16th century, using a Gothic style. The church was renovated in the Baroque period. The main street is lined with typical European architecture or the 16th & 17th centuries.
