= Languages Acts of Aragon =

Language laws in Aragon

The parliament of Aragon has passed two laws concerning the regulation of languages in the Spanish autonomous community of Aragón: the Language Act of Aragon of 2009, approved with a leftist majority in the parliament, and the Language Act of Aragon of 2013, approved with a rightist majority. Both laws have been controversial.

== Language Act of Aragon (2009) ==
The Law of the Languages of Aragon, officially known as Law 10/2009 of December 22nd, for the use, protection, and promotion of the proprietary language of Aragon was a law of Aragon (Spain) that regulated the languages spoken in the autonomous community, awarding official recognition to Aragonese and Catalan as proprietary languages; moreover, the law established the official status of the Spanish language in all parts of the territory.

The law was repealed with the introduction of the new Law of the Languages of Aragon on 24 June 2013.

=== Preceding legislature ===
- August 10, 1982: Organic Law of the Autonomous Statute of Aragon
- February 1, 1984: Declaration of Mequinenza, which brought about the agreement between the Aragon government and the Ministry of Education and Science for the implementation of a voluntary course in Catalan in municipalities that wanted them.
- December 30, 1996: Organic Law on the Reform of the Autonomous Statute Aragon, which modified article 7 of the previous law arranging that The native languages and linguistic modalities of Aragon will be protected. It guarantees the right to education and speaking these languages in the regions where they are predominantly spoken, following the Law of the Aragon Courts.
- November 6, 1997: Dictated the Special Academic Committee for Language Policy in Aragon, which declared that in Aragon they speak three languages: Spanish, Aragonese, and Catalan.
- March 10, 1999: Law 3/1999 of Aragonese Cultural Heritage, whose article 4 provided that Aragonese and Catalan, minoritized languages in Aragon, whose spheres of influence are understood as diverse linguistic modes, are a rich wealth of culture and will be especially protected by the Administration.
- January 30, 2001: Ruling of the Aragon Advisory Legal Commission. It concludes that "it is not possible, following the perspective of the constitutional adaptation, to regulate the official status of languages that are distinct from Castilian Spanish through the Aragon Courts. Nor is it possible to grant the effects of the co-official use of these languages through this hypothetical law." At the same time remembering that "the other Spanish languages will also be official, but it is necessary to have a specific pronouncement in the Autonomous Statute."
- March 13, 2001: Draft of the Law of the Languages of Aragon, which would not eventually become an official law. The law established the linguistic zoning of Aragon, which divided it into three zones, along with which it included in text a message to Aragonese-speaking and Catalan-speaking municipalities. Despite the determined months before the Legal Advising Commission, the draft established the cooficiality of Aragonese and Catalan in their respective linguistic zones.
- 2003: Survey on the linguistic usage in the eastern regions of Aragon, carried out by the Aragon Institute of Statistics
- 2004: 'Statistics of the Linguistic Usage in the "Aragon Stripe"', carried out by the Catalan Majority

=== Approval ===
The law was approved by votes from the political parties PSOE and CHA, but opposed by the PP and PAR parties, who objected to the designation "Catalan" for the native language of western Aragon.

== Language Act of Aragon (2013) ==
=== Preceding legislation ===
- August 10, 1982: Organic Law 8/1982 of the Aragonese Statute of Autonomy
- February 1, 1984: The Declaration of Mequinenza, which created the agreement between the Government of Aragon and the Ministry of Education and Science for the implementation of a voluntary Catalan course in municipalities that want it
- December 30, 1996: Organic Law 5/1996 reforming the Aragonese Statute of Autonomy, which modified article 7
- November 6, 1997: The Ruling of the Special Commission to Study Language Policy in Aragon, which declares that three languages are spoken in Aragon: Castilian (Spanish), Aragonese, and Catalan, and that the latter two languages are spoken in distinct forms.
- March 10, 1999: Law 3/1999 of Aragonese Cultural Heritage, which establishes in article 4 that Aragonese and Catalan, Aragon’s minority languages, including the diverse linguistic modalities thereof, are of great cultural value and will be specially protected by the Administration.
- January 30, 2001: The Ruling of the Legal Advisory Commission of Aragon, which concludes that "it is not possible, from a constitutional point of view, to regulate by means of an ordinary law of the Aragonese Courts the official status of languages other than Spanish, nor to grant their use a status of co-officiality." The Ruling also recalled that "the other Spanish languages can also be official, but this requires a specific pronouncement in the proper Statute of Autonomy."
- March 13, 2001: The Draft Law of Languages in Aragon, which would not become a bill. This bill advocated for creating three linguistic zones in Aragon, and included a list of municipalities considered Aragonese-speaking and those considered Catlan-speaking. Despite what the Legal Advisory Commission had recommended months before, the text of the draft law established the co-officiality of Aragonese and Catalan in their respective zones of linguistic predominance.
- 2003: Year 2003: Survey of linguistic uses in the eastern regions of Aragon, carried out by the Aragonese Institute of Statistics
- 2004: A study on the Statistics of Linguistic Uses in the Aragon Strip is carried out by the Generalitat of Catalonia.
- December 22, 2009: Approval of the first Aragonese Language Law, regulating the use, protection and promotion of Aragonese and Catalan as Aragon's own languages.

=== Contents ===
Paradoxically, the development of the law caused extraordinary controversy both inside and outside of Aragon, even though the majority of the articles of the new legal text contain content substantially identical to that of the 2009 law, in some cases the articles being the exact same text.

With that said, in terms of the regulation of linguistic rights and activity of the Aragonese public administration in relation to the proper historical languages, the new law covers practically the same content that was covered by the 2009 law for materials on anthroponomy, granting of public instruments, use of the proper historic languages of Aragon in local government administrations, teaching, presence in media, protection of material and immaterial linguistic patrimony, etc.

The law only introduced light modifications to minor relative aspects of the regulation of place names (toponyms) and the use by citizens of their own historical languages to address Aragonese institutions.

In this way, the legal text of 2009 foresaw the possibility that the official denomination of the place names (toponyms) for predominant linguistic zones of Aragonese and Catalan could be in those languages, meanwhile the 2013 text covers this same possibility that the places are named in their proper historical languages, but in a bilingual system (in the proper historical language and Castellano).

With regards to the rights of speakers to address Aragonese institutions in their own historical languages, the law replaces the obligation of these speakers to answer to citizens in Aragonese with the option to instead use their own historical languages.

The new law modifies the official naming of Aragonese languages, changing with them the standardized section and institutional relevance of said languages stated in the 2009 law. Furthermore, the title of the law indicates that these languages are formed by linguistic modalities with their proper identities, similarly to how the law substantially changed the linguistic zoning established by the previous law.

=== Naming of the languages ===
The chosen denominations for the proper and historical languages of Aragon in the 2013 law was the most controversial theme during the process of creating the law as well as after its passing. Thus, the law eliminated the naming of Aragonese and Catalan, which the 2009 text contained in order to refer to these languages, and substituted them for circumlocutions: Aragonese language typical of the Pyrenean and pre-Pyrenean areas to refer to Aragonese, and Aragonese language typical of the Oriental area to refer to Catalan. Additionally, the law highlights the fact that these two languages are constituted by their own linguistic modalities.

The new law suppresses the Superior Advisor of Aragonese Languages, the Aragonese Academy of the Catalan Language, and the Academy of the Aragonese Language, with them being replaced by the Aragonese Academy of the Language which will be accredited with the responsibility of normalization and consultation.

In relation to the names adopted by the law to refer to the proper languages and in a simultaneous manner to the parliamentary debate, it was rapidly popularized at a social and newspaper level the acronyms LAPAPYP or lapapyp, and LAPAO or lapao. The Aragonese government signaled that these acronyms are not official and do not appear in the text of the law and the belief is held that they are invented by the opposition and by Catalan sectionists.

=== Linguistic zoning ===
The new rule will continue to use the legal concept of linguistic zoning, or linguistic predominance, as an instrument to guarantee diversity and linguistic pluralism in the autonomous community. However, going against the complete linguistic zoning of the 2009 law, which recognized the Aragonese territory as being divided into four different linguistic zones (predominantly Aragonese, predominantly Catalan, predominantly mixed Aragonese–Catalan, exclusive use of Castilian), the new legal text of this law limits recognition to the particular existence of two specific linguistic zones:

- A zone of the historically predominant use of the Aragonese language native to the Pyrenees and pre-Pyrenees, with their linguistic modalities (region of historic Araganese usage)
- A zone of the historically predominant use of the Aragonese languages native to the eastern region, with their linguistic modalities (region of historic Catalan usage)

This new law, similar to that of 2009, does not delineate zones; however, it leaves the regulatory development and determination of each one of these two zones to the individual municipalities. This follows the precedent of the draft bill of the Languages Act of Aragon (2001), which outlines a concrete relationship between the municipalities of predominantly Aragonese and Catalan linguistics.

=== Reception ===
This law is rather controversial, whose controversy began before its approval.

There was an internet petition to stop the process of approval that reached more than 4,828 signatures. Also there have been petitions, like that of the Academy of Good (Letters) in Barcelona, asking for the restoration of the Catalan denomination, or that of the Role of Aragonese Studies with "a protest signed by more than 600 language experts of Spain and Europe defending the existence of Catalan and Aragonese in Aragon."

Its supporters affirm that the new law has been made with "a social and cultural criterion" that the previous law lacked. Additionally, they point out that the implementation of the previous law would have resulted in an outlay of up to 39 million euros that would be inadequate in a moment of economic crisis. The opposition, on the contrary, argues that the denominations of the native languages within the law lack "academic rigor" and describe the endorsement as "ridiculous and embarrassing" and accuse the coalition government of not having pursued any consensus on the approval of the law, being that all of the amendments presented by the opposition (73 from PSOE, 53 from CHA, and 42 from IU) were rejected.

The law has been expressly supported by the We Do Not Speak Catalan Platform, which does not accept the denomination of "Catalan" to refer to the native language of Aragon, including its western stripe.

In addition to the parliamentary opposition in Aragon Courts, outside of the autonomous community, other political parties oppose this law, including the CDC, the Catalonian Majority, C's, the PP, ICV-EUiA, CUP, and the PSC, which registered a resolution in the Catalonian Parliament to urge the Aragonese government to step back on this issue.

In the days after the approval of the law, the Aragonese media and national media criticized the law particularly for its use of the term 'lapao.'

The defenders of the law maintained that the term 'lapao' had been invented by its critics, and that the inhabitants of these areas give their dialects names. For example, the dialect in Fraga is called "fragati," while the dialect of Tamarite de Litera is referred to as "tamaritano."

The lack of reference to Castilian Spanish in the law has also been the target of criticism, as the previous version of the law referenced it. The political party Union for Progress and Democracy (UPyD) criticized the omission for having political ends.

In June 2013 the six associations tasked with the preservation, teaching, and spread of Aragonese signed a manifesto in favor of the Aragonese language and against the new language law. Six other organizations (the Council for Spoken Aragonese, The Nogara Association, the Society of the Aragonese Language, the School of Aragonese Philosophy, and the League of Aragonese Speakers) participated in writing the manifesto but ultimately decided not to sign it.

For their part, the government of Spain declared that they respected the approval of the law and reaffirmed the ability of the autonomous communities to regulate their co-official languages.

Days before the law was scheduled to be approved, the government of Alcampell rejected the law and gave sole official status to Catalan. The Provincial Government of Huesca also approved a resolution favoring the repeal of the Law of Languages for failing to recognize the trilingual nature of the community. On June 1, 2013, various councilors and mayors of municipalities of Franja met in Mequinenza (evoking the meeting 30 years earlier) and signed the Declaration of Mequinenza to show their opposition to the law of 2013 for failing to recognize Catalan under its own name, but only by the moniker "Eastern Aragonese."

=== Consequences ===
The approval of this law overrode the earlier Law of Languages of 2009. It eliminated the Superior General of the Aragonese Language and created the Academy of Aragonese Language. The academy aimed to determine official toponyms and names for the community, so as to standardize their use of the languages and dialects.
