= Gaspar Torrente =

Spanish activist

Gaspar Torrente Español (13 October 1888 in Campo, Ribagorza, Aragon - 21 March 1970 in Barcelona, Catalonia) was one of the early 20th century leaders and a founding father of Aragonese nationalism.
