= Arredol =

Electronic Aragonese-language newspaper

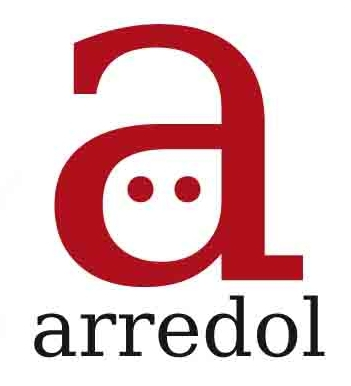
- Type: Electronic newspaper
- Format: Digital
- Publisher: Chorche Romance
- Founded: 19 September 2011
- Political alignment: Progressivism
- Language: Aragonese language
- Ceased publication: 15 March 2017
- Headquarters: Zaragoza
- Website: arainfo.org/perfil/arredol/

Arredol (Note: Aragonese pronunciation: [areˈðol], lit. 'around') was an electronic newspaper written in the Aragonese language. The newspaper was founded on 19 September 2011, and at the time was the first digital news source written entirely in Aragonese. The project was open to contributions from readers themselves who may provide news, articles, and images.

The language model Arredol uses is the standardized spelling of the Academia de l'Aragonés, which most institutions and associations support to be more in keeping with the etymology and medieval Aragonese.

Upon the launch of the newspaper, its editors were Chorche Burgos Romance, Lucía Marco López and Carlos García.

All contents of this newspaper were published under the Creative Commons Attribution-ShareAlike 3.0.

== See also ==
- List of newspapers in Spain
