= Fago =

Municipality of Spain

Coordinates: 42°44′07″N 0°51′56″W

- Municipality
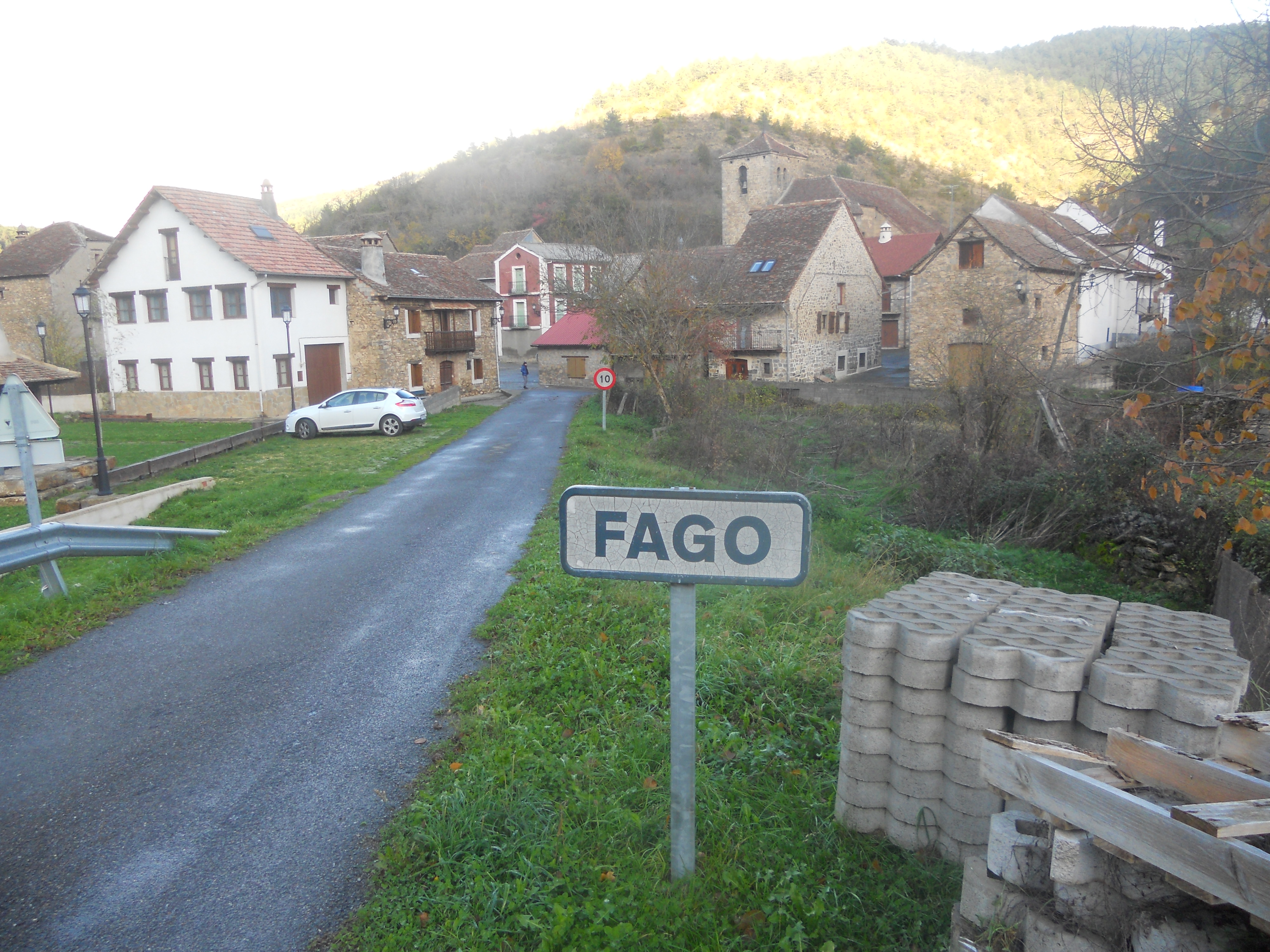

- Flag Coat of arms
- Interactive map of Fago
- Country: Spain
- Autonomous community: Aragon
- Province: Huesca
- Comarca: Jacetania

Area
  - Total: 28.76 km^{2} (11.10 sq mi)
- Elevation: 888 m (2,913 ft)

Population (2025-01-01)
  - Total: 24
  - Density: 0.83/km^{2} (2.2/sq mi)
- Time zone: UTC+1 (CET)
  - Summer (DST): UTC+2 (CEST)

Fago is a town and municipality located in the province of Huesca, Aragon, Spain. Its Postal Code is 22729.

== History ==
On 13 January 2007, the mayor of Fago town, Miguel José Grima Masiá, was murdered by his political enemy, Santiago Mainar Sauras.

== See also ==
- List of municipalities in Huesca
