= Juan de Aragüés =

Spanish composer

Juan de Aragüés (c. 1710 – 28 May 1793) was a Spanish composer. By 1754 he was professor of music at the University of Salamanca.
