= Naval, Huesca =

Naval Nabal
- Municipality
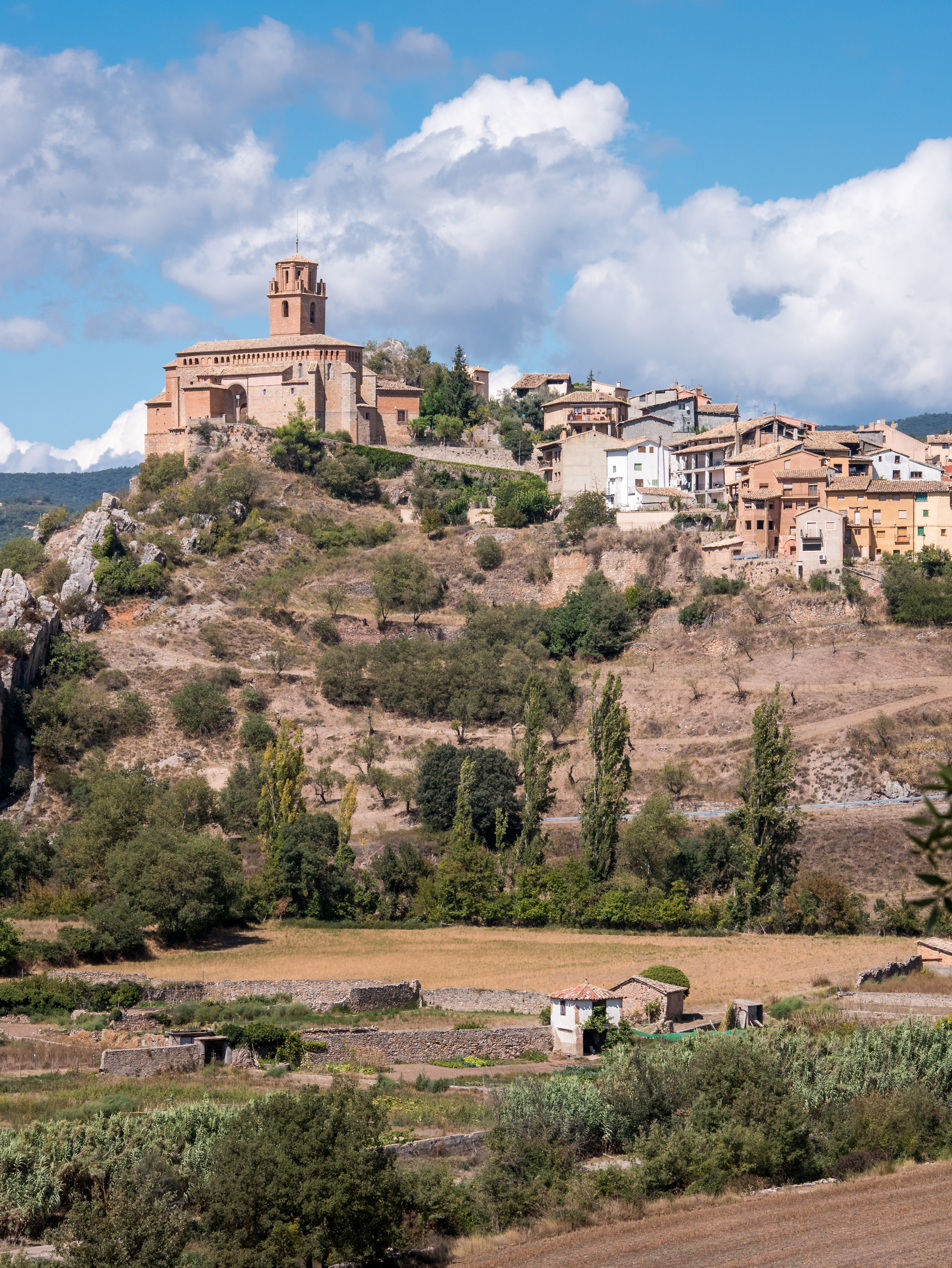

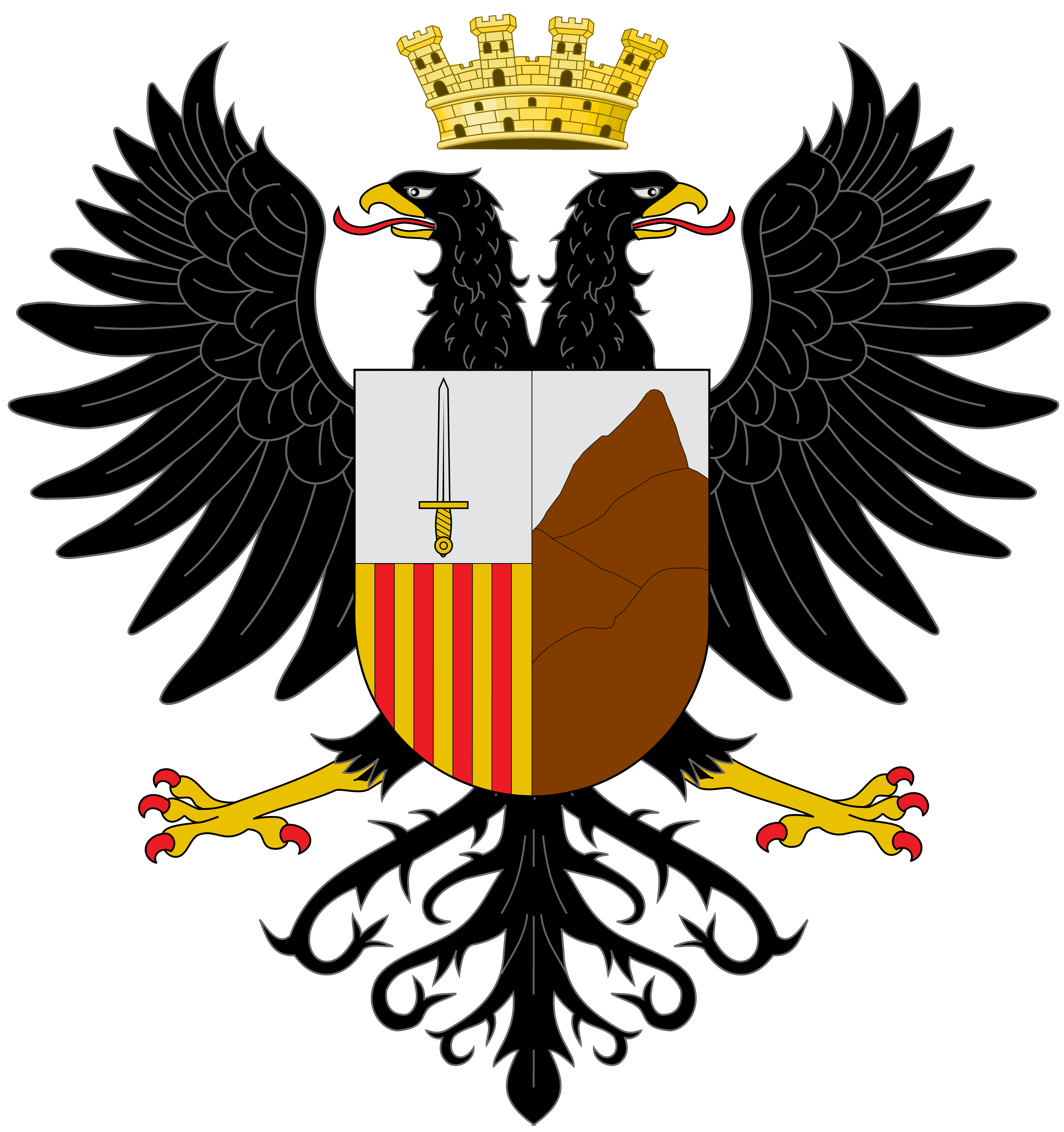
- Coat of arms

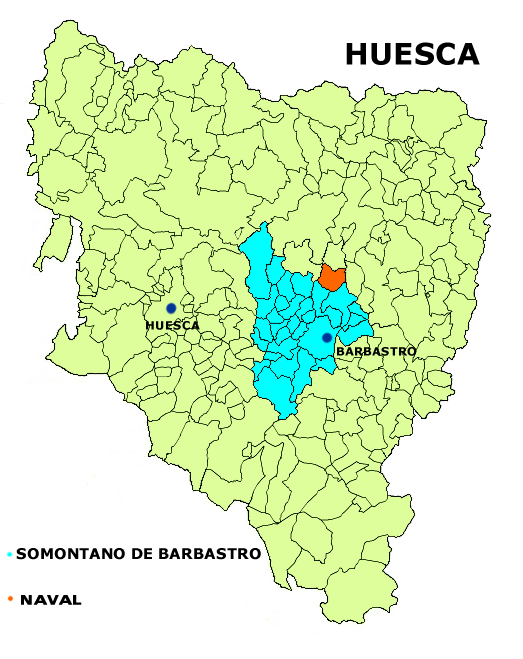

- Location in Spain
- Coordinates: 42°11′35″N 0°9′5″E
- Country: Spain
- Autonomous community: Aragón
- Province: Huesca
- Comarca: Somontano de Barbastro
- Judicial district: Barbastro

Government
  - Alcalde: Maria Pilar Carruesco Buetas

Area
  - Total: 47.44 km^{2} (18.32 sq mi)
- Elevation: 631 m (2,070 ft)

Population (2025-01-01)
  - Total: 281
  - Density: 5.92/km^{2} (15.3/sq mi)
- Demonym(s): Navales, -a
- Time zone: UTC+1 (CET)
  - Summer (DST): UTC+2 (CEST)
- Postal code: 22320

Naval (Aragonese Nabal) is a municipality located in the province of Huesca, Aragon, Spain. According to the 2018 census (INE), the municipality has a population of 269 inhabitants.

Naval has long been known for its pottery and, above all, its salt flats. The salt flats of Naval were likely known and exploited in prehistoric times, as well as during the Roman era. In 1099, King Peter I of Aragon conquered Naval, and since the Muslim inhabitants peacefully surrendered the town, he allowed them to retain ownership of salt works in exchange for paying him one-fifth of the value of the salt they obtained. Over time, part of the salt flats passed into the hands of other owners, especially monasteries in the area. In 1274, King James I granted these salt flats a monopoly on the sale of salt in much of what is now the province of Huesca. For several centuries, the residents of Naval exploited them until they were expropriated by Philip V in 1707 to become part of the royal monopoly on this product, although the owners received an annual compensation. In 1870, the property was returned to the old owners. Today, in addition to the facilities still used for salt production, several saltwater pools have been opened for bathing.

== See also ==
- List of municipalities in Huesca
