= Sociedat de Lingüistica Aragonesa =

The Sociedat de Lingüistica Aragonesa - the Society of Aragonese Linguistics (or Sociedad de Lingüística Aragonesa in Spanish) is a society dedicated to the promotion of the Aragonese language.

It was founded in 2004 to provide an alternative to the Consello d'a Fabla Aragonesa (Council of the Aragonese Language). It produced an alternative to the Huesca orthography (Grafía Huesca), which is promoted by the Consello but considered to be too artificial by the proponents of the SLA orthography. The SLA spelling is based on spelling conventions common to other Romance languages such as Catalan and Occitan.

The SLA publishes a magazine called De Lingva Aragonensi and is currently headed by Xavier Tomás Arias.
