= Leaning Tower of Zaragoza =

Former tower in Zaragoza, Spain

Coordinates: 41.65490°N 0.88207°W

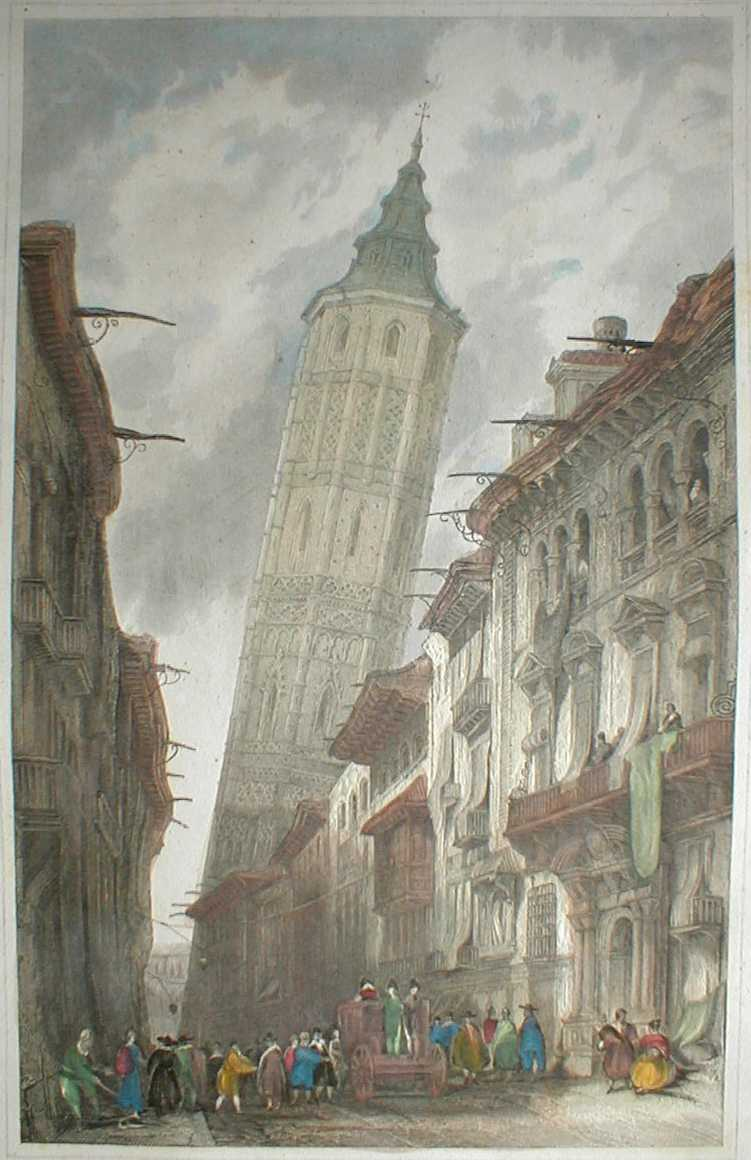
Painting of the Leaning Tower of Zaragoza in 1838 by Scottish painter David Roberts

The Leaning Tower of Zaragoza, sometimes called by its Spanish name, Torre Nueva (New Tower), was a Mudéjar leaning tower located in current Plaza de San Felipe, in Zaragoza (in Aragon, Spain).

Over the years, the tower became an icon for the city. It was also the highest Mudéjar-style tower ever built (80 m (260 ft)) in 1504. It had a diameter of 11.5 m (38 ft) and a ground plan in the shape of a 16-pointed star.

Built in the 16th century as a clock tower, it was built in brick in Mudéjar style by master builders Christians Gabriel Gombao and Antón Sariñena, Muslims Ismael Allabar and Monferriz, and Jew Juce Galí. Shortly after being built, its inclination could be noted, although it was said that there was no danger to its stability. In 1892, Zaragoza's city council decided to demolish the tower, justifying the decision with the inclination and probable ruin. The decision was opposed by many intellectuals and part of the population. After the tower's demolition, citizens bought bricks as souvenirs.

== Description ==
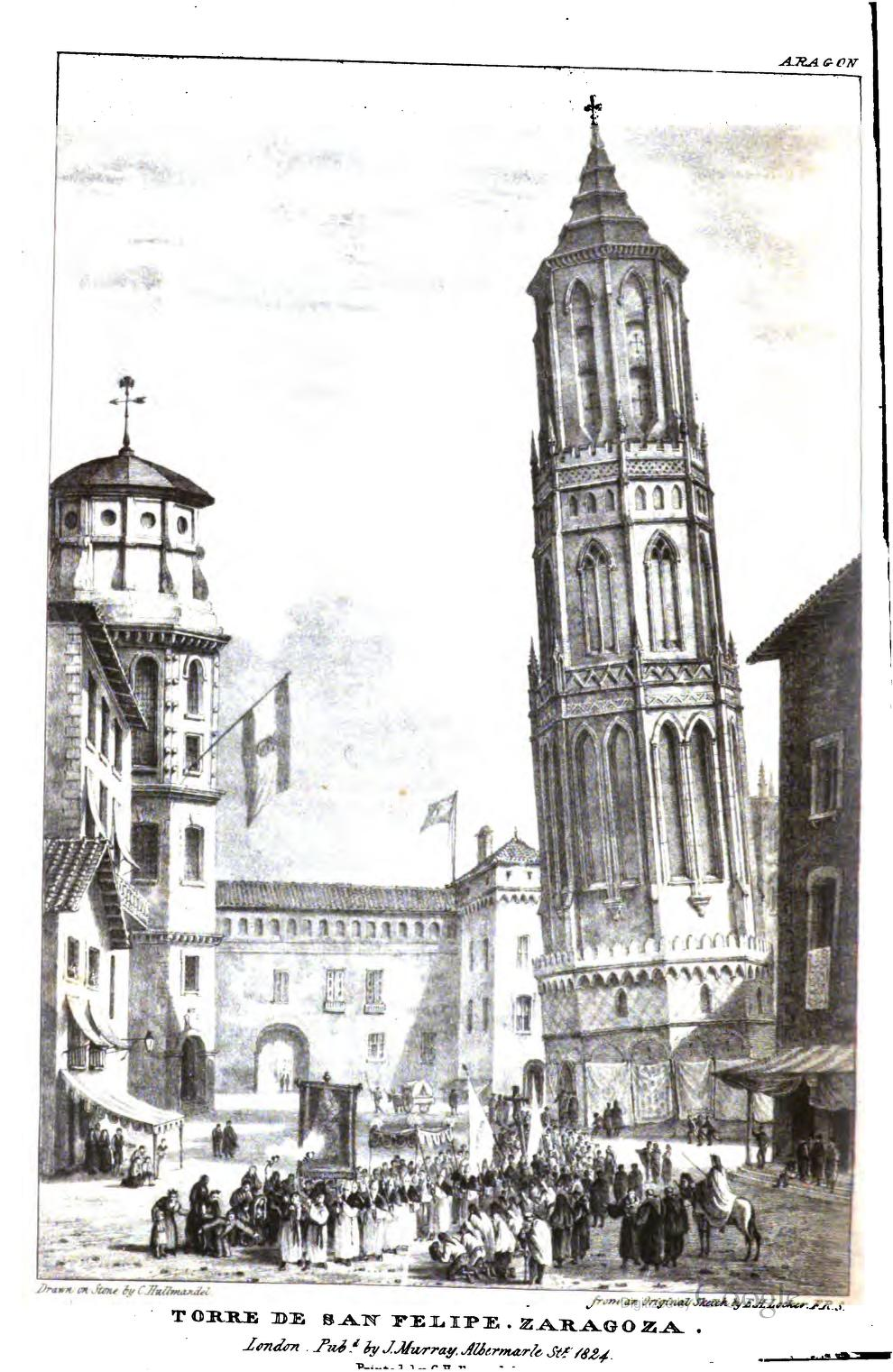
The Leaning Tower of Zaragoza by Edward Hawke Locker in 1823, published in the work Views in Spain.

The tower was built in 1504 during the reign of the Catholic Monarchs.

It had four heights. The cross section of the first was a 16-pointed star and the following were octagonal with angular buttresses, characteristic of these 16th century's towers and model and example for other towers, such as that of Colegiata de Santa Maria la Mayor, Calatayud. The building was decorated with geometric figures, ceramic, and openings with pointed arches. The top was added in 1749, being a triple spire, with slate roofs, removed in 1878 in its last years.

The tower began to lean soon after construction, possibly due to haste while building the foundation and the first body. The southern part of the tower was forged faster than the northern part, which caused a difference in tension between both sides, which inclined the tower. It was attempted to remedy by reinforcing the foundation, but the inclination was maintained. Its inclination or deviation from vertical was nearly three meters.

From the same 16th century on, the tower became a symbol of the city.

During the French Sieges to the city (1808–1809), the tower was used to monitor the movements of French troops, in addition to give notice in case of danger.

In the 19th century the tower was heavily reproduced by painters and photographers, among them Charles Clifford, in October 1860, and J. Laurent, between 1863 and 1877. It also was photographed by local photographers like Júdez and Coyne. Imperial Brands' defunct William's cigarette dedicated a picture and description as part of a collection's series about interesting buildings around the world.

A description of the tower was given in The Brickbuilder Vol. 5 No. 6, 1896:

"It stands entirely isolated in the center of a small square, and reaches to a total height of 276 ft. It measures a little over 40 ft. at the base, is in plan an octagon, and is constructed entirely of brick, but with a variety of forms, ornament, and details, recalling both the Gothic and the Moorish styles. Each story of the tower is treated in a different manner. The basement is simple and massive, and the first story is formed in the plan of a star with reentrant angles. The corner turrets of the upper portion of the tower, the pointed arched windows, and the picturesque roof, are especial features which mark this tower in an individual manner. There is nothing like it anywhere else in the world, and in many respects it is one of the most successful examples of the use of a humble material to produce a monumental effect. None of the details are helped out by stone or terra-cotta. As in the previous examples, the bricks are of the Roman type, long and flat, and are laid with a very thick bed of mortar. It is intensely interesting to study this design in detail, as we can see how cleverly the effect is obtained with a minimum of effort. The tower leans so as to overhang the base by more than 8 ft. This inclination seems to have been produced deliberately, for at the base it is much less than in the main portion of the tower."

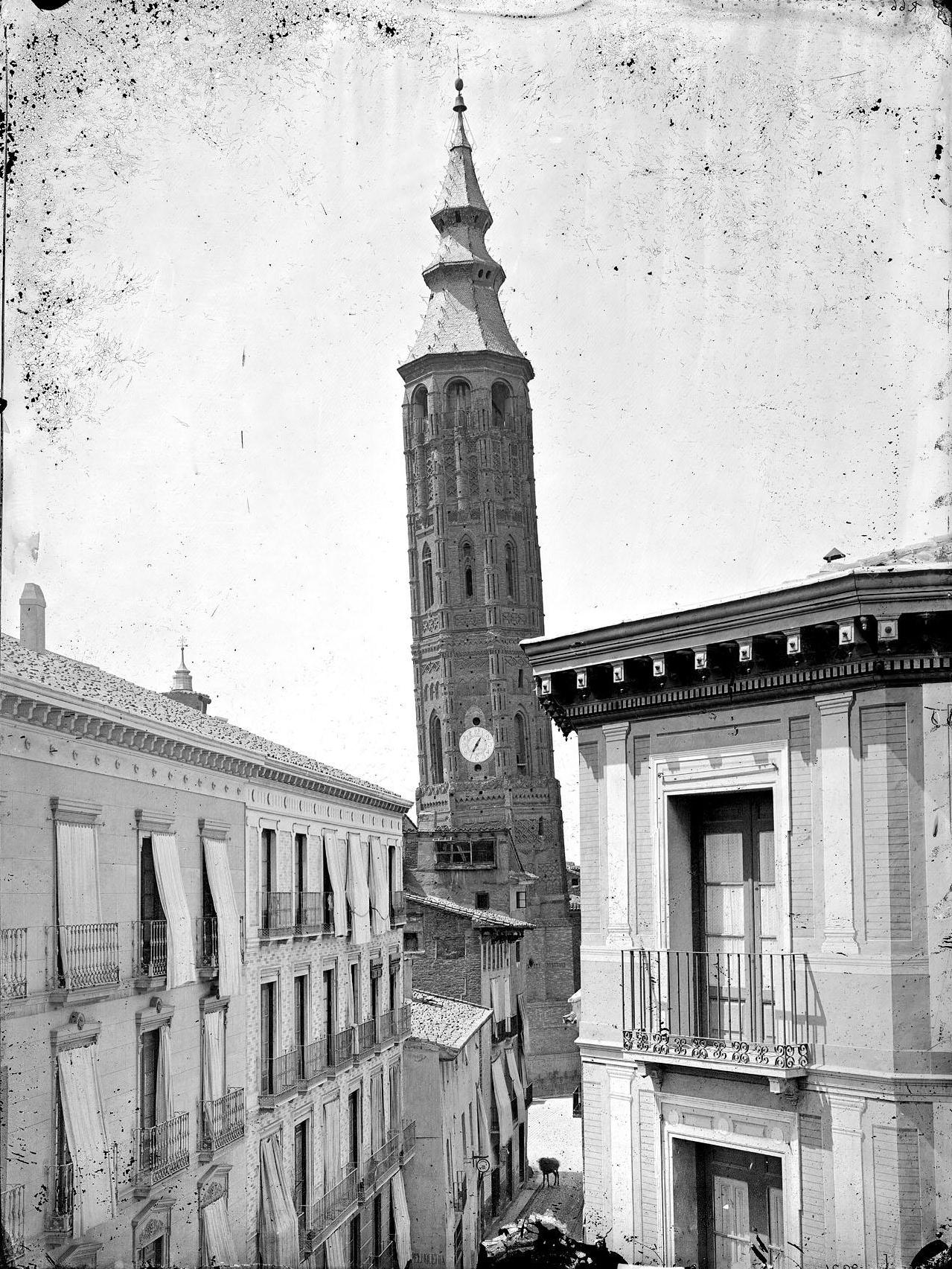
Far view of Leaning Tower of Zaragoza by J. Laurent, around 1875. Photo taken seventeen years before the tower was torn down.

== Demolition of the tower ==
In 1878 the tower was lopped, removing its triple spire. In 1892, Zaragoza's city council decided to tear down the tower, justifying the decision by inclination and alleged ruin of the work. The decision was opposed by many intellectuals and part of population, but efforts to save it were in vain.

Among defenders of the tower were the Gascón de Gotor brothers, who published numerous articles denouncing the "patricide" of "the most beautiful Mudéjar tower", calling it "the greatest artistic crime committed in Spain".

The complete demolition lasted a year, starting in the summer of 1892 with the installation of scaffolding. The bricks of the tower were sold for foundations of new houses in the city.

During the 1990s, a memorial was placed where the tower once stood. It consists of the perimeter of the tower outlined on the pavement, and a sculpture of a boy sitting on the paved plaza, looking up at the tower as if it still existed.

In one of the shops of the square there is a small museum dedicated to the tower, with photographs and pieces of it.

== Gallery ==
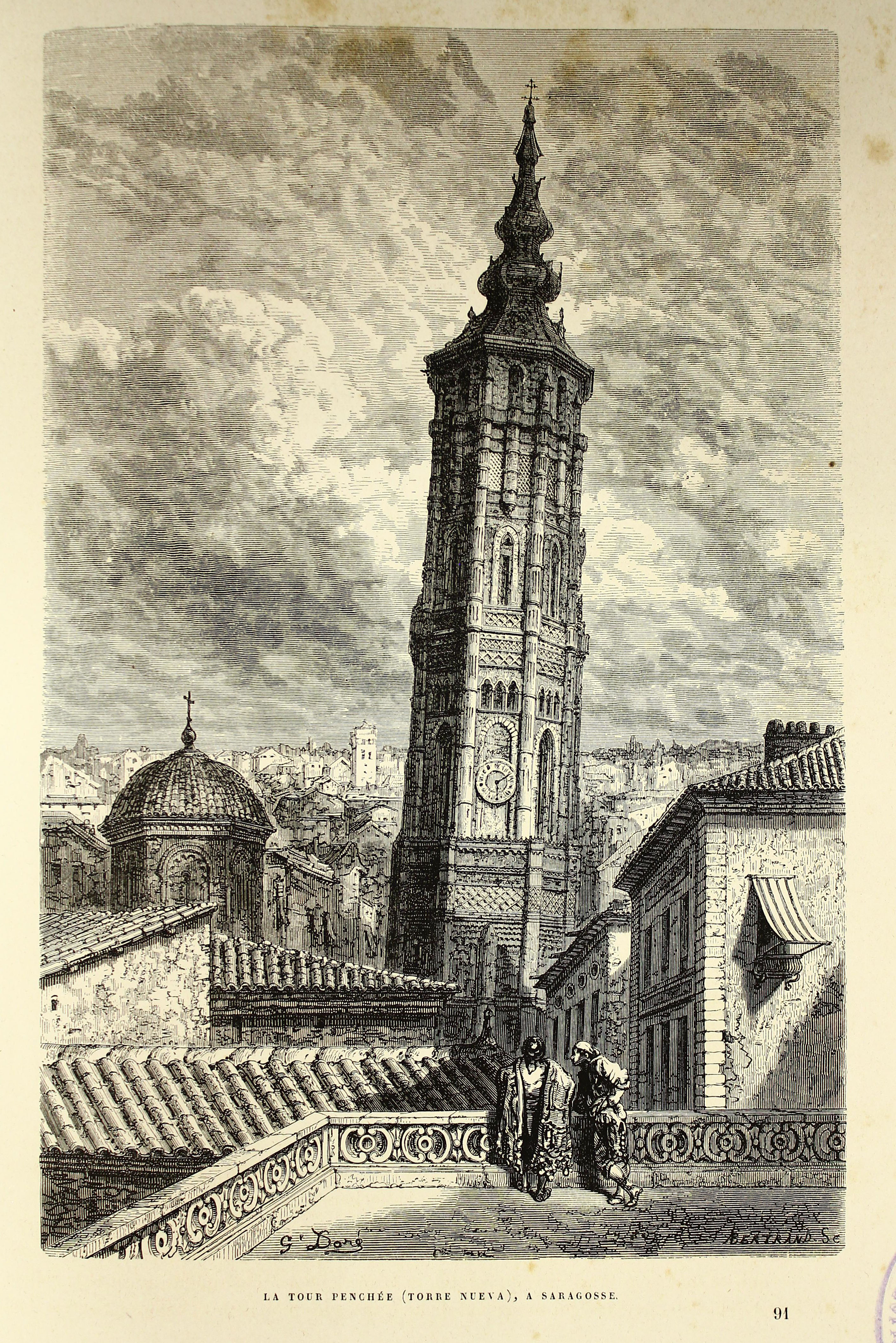
"La Tour Penchée (Leaning Tower), à Saragosse". Drawing by French painter Gustave Doré in 1874. Published in the work L'Espagne of French Baron Charles Davillier.

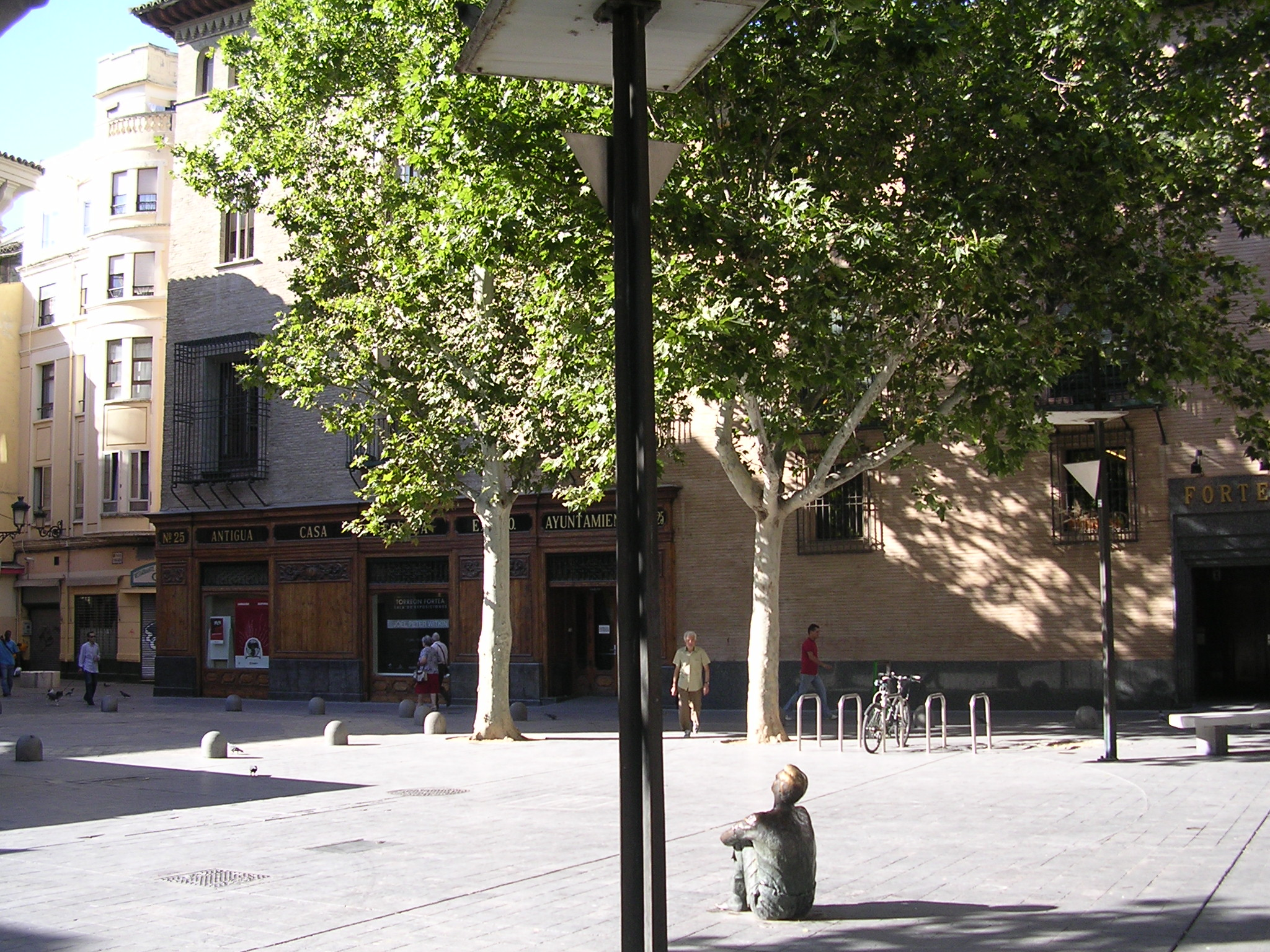
The seated boy's memorial.

== Bibliography ==
- Gómez Urdáñez, María del Carmen (2003). The Torre Nueva of Zaragoza and documentation of the 16th century: history and historiography. Review of the Department of Art History at the University of Zaragoza, ISSN 0213-1498, Nº 18, 2003, pags. 341–374 (Ref.)
- Dolader Serrano, Alberto (1989). The Torre Nueva of Zaragoza. Zaragoza, City Council of Zaragoza. ISBN 84-86807-06-9
- Mackenzie, Alexander Slidell (1834) 'Spain Revisited'. Harper & Bros.
