= Panillo =

- Locality
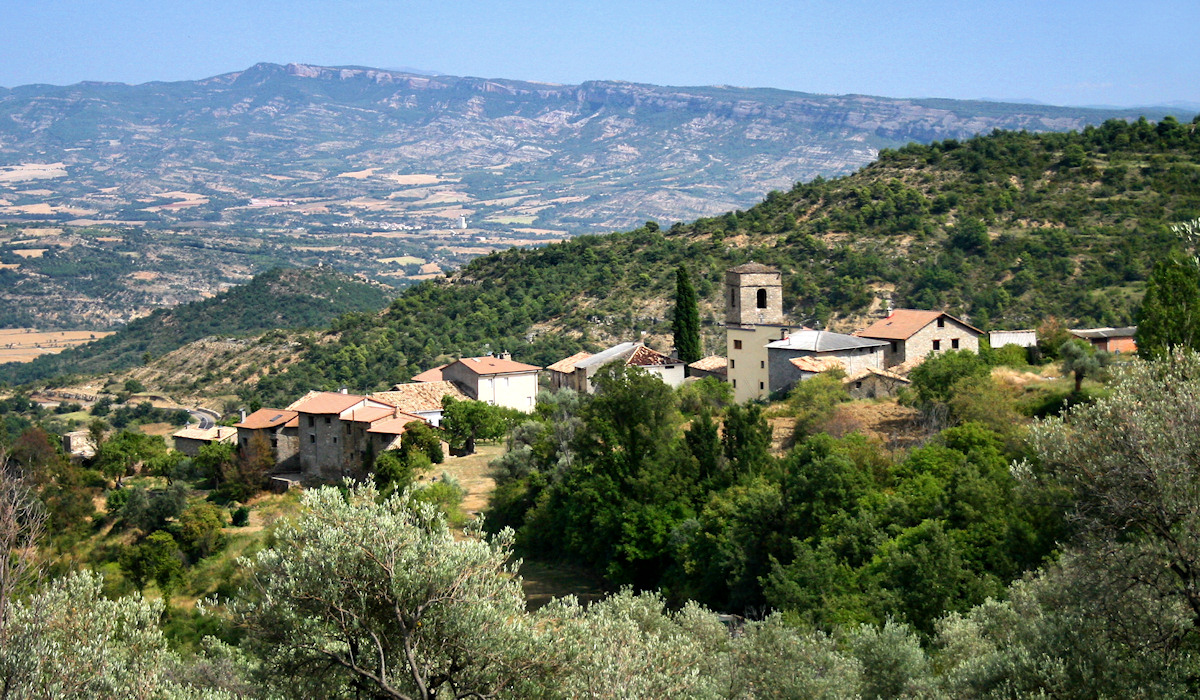

- Location within Aragon Location within Spain
- Coordinates: 42°14′13″N 0°18′2″E
- Country: Spain
- Autonomous community: Aragon
- Province: Province of Huesca
- Municipality: Graus
- Elevation: 819 m (2,687 ft)

Population
  - Total: 74

Panillo is a locality located in the municipality of Graus, in Huesca province, Aragon, Spain. As of 2020, it has a population of 74.

== Geography ==
Panillo is located 96km east-northeast of Huesca.
