= Aísa =

- municipality
- Flag Coat of arms

- Location within Aragon Location within Spain
- Coordinates: 42°40′58″N 0°37′1″W
- Country: Spain
- Autonomous community: Aragon
- Province: Huesca
- Comarca: Jacetania

Area
  - Total: 80.91 km^{2} (31.24 sq mi)

Population (2025-01-01)
  - Total: 326
  - Density: 4.03/km^{2} (10.4/sq mi)
- Time zone: UTC+1 (CET)
  - Summer (DST): UTC+2 (CEST)

Aísa is a town and municipality located in the province of Huesca, Aragon, Spain. According to the 2009 census (INE), the municipality had a population of 394 residents. The municipality includes the towns of Candanchú, Esposa and Sinués.

== See also ==
- List of municipalities in Huesca
