= Hecho Aragonese =

Dialect of Aragonese

- cheso
- Native to: Aragon, Spain
- Region: Hecho Valley
- Native speakers: Around 700 (2007)Bisas de lo Subordán
- Language family: Indo-European: Italic; Latino-Faliscan; Latinic; Romance; Italo-Western; Western; (unclassified); Pyrenean–Mozarabic?; Navarro-Aragonese; Aragonese; Western; Hecho Aragonese

Official status
- Recognised minority language in: Spain

Language codes
- ISO 639-3: –
- Glottolog: None

1990 recording of a proverb about local weather.

Hecho Aragonese, or Cheso, is a Western Aragonese variety spoken in the Hecho Valley of Northern Aragon.

== Filiation ==
Hecho Aragonese is one of Western Aragonese's most preserved varieties and it could be said that Cheso Aragonese, along with Aragüés Aragonese, is just one of several varieties of the language.

== History ==
According to Fernando Romanos, the first reference is from a 13th-century inventory at the Siresa church.

== Sociocultural aspects ==
=== Geographical situation ===
Cheso Aragonese is spoken within Hecho Valley, in 'La Jacetania' county, Hecho being its main village.

=== Social situation ===
It is the Western Aragonese variety that has its most defined features in comparison to other dialects. Today it is one of the most vital Aragonese dialects and it has been estimated that there are 658 speakers: 526 in Hecho and Ciresa villages and 132 neighbors that live outside of the valley itself.

It is taught as an optional matter (1 hour/week) at the local school.

== Literature ==
Cheso Aragonese has been one of the modern Aragonese dialects with the most literary production. Among its most famous writers, we find Veremundo Méndez and Rosario Ustáriz. One of the most famous texts in Cheso Aragonese is the jota song S'ha feito de nuey, written by Pepe Lera, published in the magazine Fuellas, edited by Consello d'a Fabla Aragonesa (FUELLAS, nº 20, nov-dec 1980) and played by Lera's band Val d'Echo.

S'ha feito de nuey

(Cheso orthography)

S'ha feito de nuey.
Tu m'aguardas ya.
Lo peito me brinca'n
tornarte a besar.
Lo nuestro querer
no se crebará
anque charren muito
y te fagan plorar.
Yo no'n quiero vier
güellos de cristal
mulláus por glarimas
que culpa no han.
Escuita, muller,
dixa de plorar.
Yo siempre he estau tuyo,
tu mía has d'estar.
Dicen qu'un querer
ye de dos, no más,
y que ye más fácil
ferlo caminar,
cuando l'uno caye,
l'otro a devantar.
Cuando l'uno caye,
l'otro a devantar;
s'ha feito de nuey,
tu m'aguardas ya,
lo peito me brinca,
te quiero besar!

—Pepe Lera, Hecho, August 1980

== See also ==
- Aragonese dialects
