= Academia de l'Aragonés =

Estudio de Filología Aragonesa
- Abbreviation: EFA
- Formation: 2006
- Headquarters: Zaragoza, Aragon, Spain
- Region served: Aragon
- Official language: Aragonese
- President: Manuel Castán
- Main organ: Consello de Gubierno
- Website: www.efaragonesa.org

The Academia de l'Aragonés (in English, Academy of the Aragonese [Language]) is an organization founded on 15 July 2006 by the 2nd Congress on the Aragonese so as to be the linguistic authority for the Aragonese language. It has no official recognition by the Aragonese government.

The aims of the academy, according to its statute, are:

- Investigate all the oral and written manifestations of the Aragonese language
- Gather and update its lexicon
- Regulate the Aragonese toponymy and onomastic
- Research and formulate spelling, grammar and phonetic rules for all the constitutive dialects
- Fix, develop and improve the standard modality
- Procure respect for the linguistic rights of Aragonese speakers

The organization publishes the collection of digital publications EDACAR (Edicions Dichitals de l'Academia de l'Aragonés), where essays, articles and monographs on Aragonese are published in digital format and freely distributed.

The EFA publishes and maintains the Diccionario Multilingüe Aragonés (DicAra), which contains translations into Spanish, Catalan and English of some 90,000 lemmas.

== Academics ==
It has 15 full members and 5 honorary members, and its current (as of 2012) president is Manuel Castán.

== See also ==
- Rosario Ustáriz Borra
