= Jasa =

Coordinates: 42°41′N 0°40′W

Jasa (Spanish) Chasa (Aragonese)
- municipality
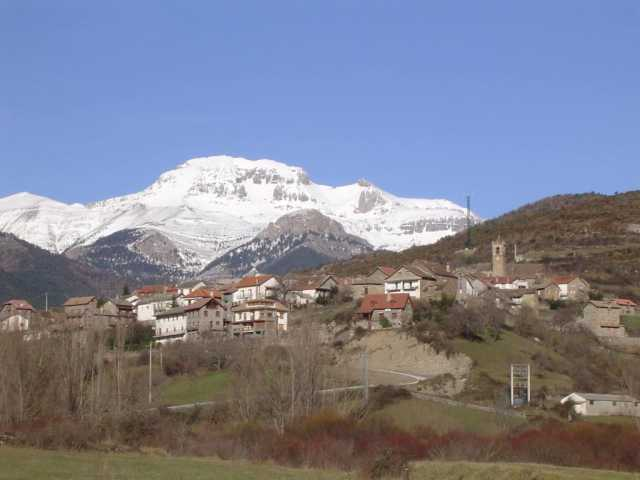
- Partial View of Jasa

- Flag Coat of arms
- Interactive map of Jasa (Spanish)
- Country: Spain
- Autonomous community: Aragon
- Province: Huesca

Area
  - Total: 9 km^{2} (3.5 sq mi)

Population (2025-01-01)
  - Total: 90
  - Density: 10/km^{2} (26/sq mi)
- Time zone: UTC+1 (CET)
  - Summer (DST): UTC+2 (CEST)

Jasa (in Aragonese: Chasa) is a municipality located in the province of Huesca, Aragon, Spain. According to the 2004 census (INE), the municipality has a population of 128 inhabitants.

== See also ==
- List of municipalities in Huesca
