= Aragüés del Puerto =

Aragüés del Puerto (Spanish) Aragüés de lo Puerto (Aragonese) Aragüés d'o Puerto (Aragonese)
- Location in Spain
- Coordinates: 42°42′N 0°40′W
- Country: Spain
- Autonomous community: Aragon
- Province: Huesca
- Comarca: La Jacetania

Government
  - Mayor: María Teresa Ipas Ariguel

Area
  - Total: 64 km^{2} (25 sq mi)
- Elevation: 970 m (3,180 ft)

Population (2025-01-01)
  - Total: 123
  - Density: 1.9/km^{2} (5.0/sq mi)
- Time zone: UTC+1 (CET)
  - Summer (DST): UTC+2 (CEST)

Aragüés del Puerto (in Aragonese: both Aragüés de lo Puerto or Aragüés d'o Puerto) is a municipality located in the province of Huesca, Aragon, Spain. As of 2016 the municipality has a population of 115 inhabitants.

== See also ==
- List of municipalities in Huesca
