= Sinués =

- Locality
- Location within Aragon Location within Spain
- Coordinates: 42°39′14″N 0°38′59″W
- Country: Spain
- Autonomous community: Aragon
- Province: Province of Huesca
- Municipality: Aísa
- Elevation: 1,086 m (3,563 ft)

Population
  - Total: 55

Sinués is a locality located in the municipality of Aísa, in Huesca province, Aragon, Spain. As of 2020, it has a population of 55.

== Geography ==
Sinués is located 94km north-northwest of Huesca.
