= Esposa, Huesca =

Esposa
- Locality
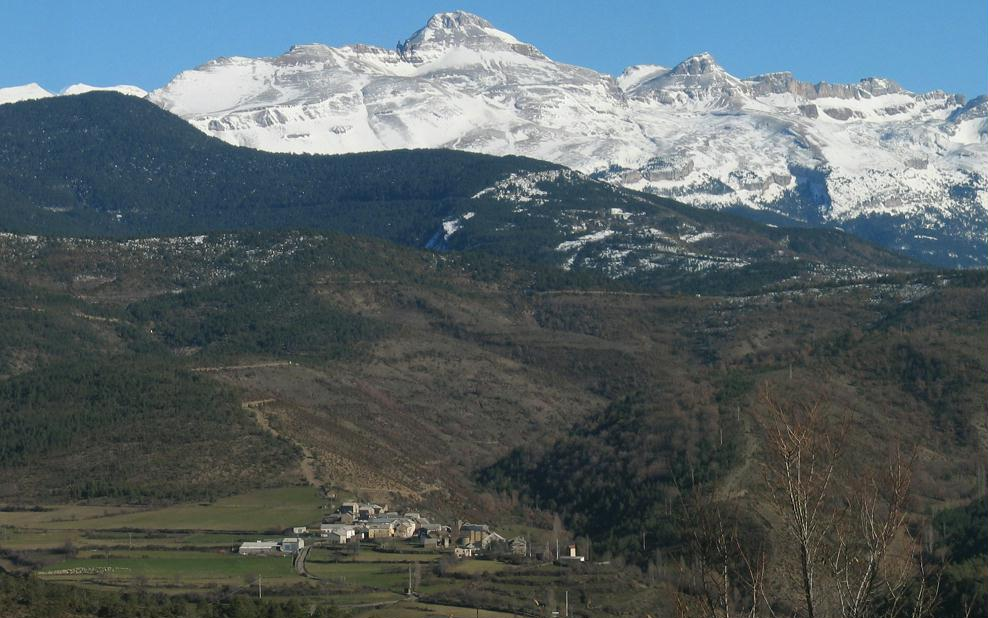

- Location within Aragon Location within Spain
- Coordinates: 42°39′41″N 0°37′28″W
- Country: Spain
- Autonomous community: Aragon
- Province: Province of Huesca
- Municipality: Aísa
- Elevation: 978 m (3,209 ft)

Population
  - Total: 45

Esposa is a locality situated in the municipality of Aísa, in Huesca province, Aragon, Spain. As of 2020, it has a population of 45.

== Geography ==
Esposa is located 90 km north-northwest of Huesca.
