= Ribagorçan =

Group of transitional Aragonese-Catalan dialects spoken in Spain

- ribagorsano, ribagorzano
- Native to: Spain
- Region: Aragon, Catalonia: Ribagorza/Ribagorça and La Litera/La Llitera in Aragon; Alta Ribagorça in Catalonia
- Language family: Indo-European: Italic; Latino-Faliscan; Latinic; Romance; Italo-Western; Western; Ribagorçan
- Dialects: Several Catalan and Aragonese transitional dialects, such as Benasquese

Official status
- Recognised minority language in: Spain

Language codes
- ISO 639-3: –
- Linguist List: arg-eas Eastern Aragonese
- cat-rib Ribagorçan
- Glottolog: None

Ribagorçan (autonym: ribagorsano or ribagorzano) (Note: Ribagorçan: ribagorsano [riβaɣoɾˈsano] or ribagorzano [riβaɣoɾˈθano]; Aragonese: ribagorzano [ɾiβaɣoɾˈθano]; Standard Catalan: ribagorçà [riβəɣuɾˈsa].) is a number of Romance dialects spoken in the modern territories of the medieval County of Ribagorza, in northern Spain.

The area corresponds to the modern administrative units of Ribagorza/Ribagorça and La Litera/La Llitera, in the province of Huesca, Aragon, and Alta Ribagorça in the province of Lleida, Catalonia. Today, depending on provincial and regional perspectives, Ribagorçan may be described in Aragon as transitional to Catalan, or in Catalonia as transitional to Aragonese. Eastern dialects in the area tend to be classified as Catalan, and western dialects as Aragonese, with a small central area of more difficult classification.

Historically, the county and its dialect was influenced by its political alliances, conquerors and rulers—ranging from the Romans to the Goths, Navarrese, the Franks, Moors, Castilians and Catalans. As such, the spoken language evolved from a variant of Vulgar Latin and was influenced along the way by its geo-linguistic neighbors—Basque, Gascon (Occitan), Castilian, French, Aragonese and Catalan.

== Written language ==
Being predominantly a spoken language, written documents are scarce, but they do exist—most notably, the Pastoradas of Benabarre compiled by Ricardo del Arco as well the writings of Tonón de Baldomera and poetry of Cleto Torrodellas; and more recently works by Ana Tena Puy, Carmen Castán and Bienvenido Mascaray Sin.

With the recognition of Aragonese as a language in 2003, intra-regional identities, among them Ribagorçan, have gained strength, and there is renewed interest in preserving, teaching and developing the local dialects commonly referred to as fabla.

== Linguistic characteristics ==
In Aragon, the dialect in Ribagorza can be clustered into two main groups: Upper and Lower Ribagorçan defined by an isogloss line running east–west from the Turbón mountain. However locals prefer to demarcate three subdialects:

- Upper, or altorribagorzano (also called Benasquese in Benasque; transitional Catalan, Aragonese and Gascon dialect)
- Middle, or meyorribagorzano (transitional to Upper and Lower), as exemplified by the language spoken in Campo;
- Lower, or baxorribagorzano, spoken in and south of Graus, and more influenced by Spanish.

In Catalonia the Ribagorçan dialect spoken in the county of Alta Ribagorça, is also clustered. A dialectal variant exemplified by the Ribagorçan speakers of Pont de Suert, is Catalan dominant transitional to Aragonese with some traits of Aranese Gascon.

== Phonology ==
Some features include:

- Palatalization of /l/ in consonant clusters (i.e. /bl pl ɡl kl fl/); e.g., pllou [ˈpʎɔw] ('it rains'), cllau [ˈkʎaw] ('key')
- General loss of Latin final unstressed vowels except for /a/, as in Catalan, and rarely /o/. Moving westward preserved final /o/ is more frequent.
- Occasional diphthongization of Romance short vowels, as in Aragonese: /ɛ/ → [je̞]; /ɔ/ → [we̞], becoming more generalized moving westward; e.g., Latin terra → tierra [ˈtje̞ra]; Latin pōns → puent [ˈpwe̞n(t)]
- Occasional interdental fricative as reflex of Latin /k/ before front vowels; e.g., cinc [ˈθiŋk] ('five'). This feature gets more general moving westward (cf. Eastern Ribagorçan and Catalan cinc [ˈsiŋk]).
- Different results for second-person plural endings of verbs (Latin -tis), from west to east: -z [θ] (as in some western variants of Aragonese), -tz [ts] (as in Occitan) or -u [w] (as in modern Catalan).
- Different results from the Romance voiced prepalatal affricate ([dʒ] from i-, dj- and gj-), from west to east: [tʃ] (as in some occidental variants of Aragonese and apitxat Valencian), [dʒ] (as in medieval Catalan and most of contemporary Valencian and Occitan), [ʒ] (as in most of contemporary Catalan). E.g., [tʃ] óvens (Western Ribagorza), [dʒ] óvens (Eastern Ribagorçan) ('young ones').
- Loss of final /r/ of infinitives and polysyllabic words, a feature shared with most of contemporary Catalan (except Valencian variants). E.g., Latin mvlier → muller [muˈʎe] ('woman'), Vulgar Latin tripaliāre → treballar [tɾeβaˈʎa] ('to work')

== Morphology and syntax ==
- Preterite formed with auxiliary forms derived from Latin vadere + infinitive, e.g., va fer [ˈba ˈfe] ('he/she did'), a feature shared with Catalan that is characteristic of Western Aragonese dialects westward from Gistaín valley.

== Bibliography ==
- Arnal Purroy, María Luisa & Naval López, Maria Ángeles. Lengua y literatura de unos poemas en ribagorzano (1861–1888). Archivo de Filología Aragonesa XLII-XLIII. 1989.
