= Estadilla =

Coordinates: 42°03′N 0°15′E

- municipality
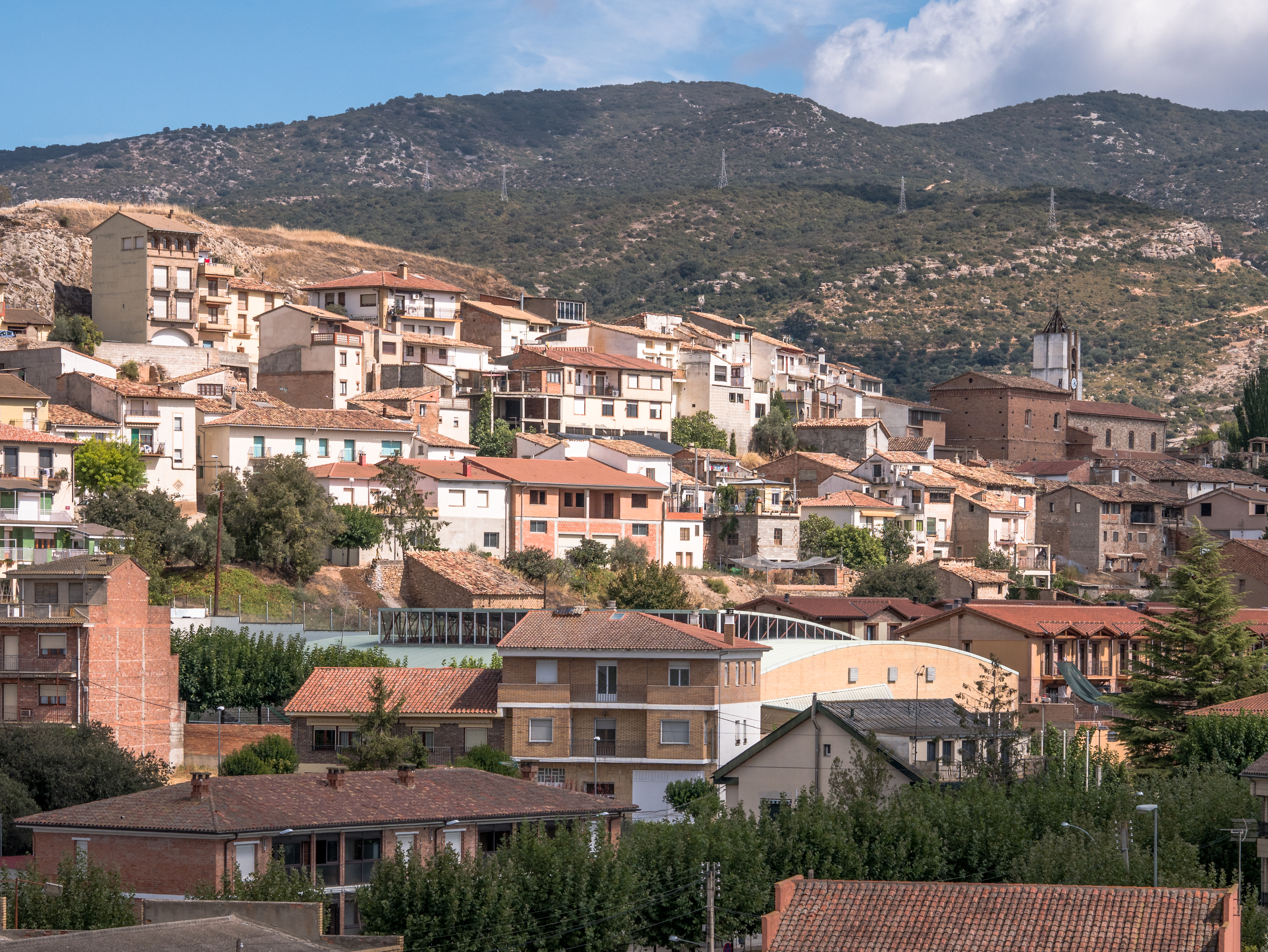
- View of Estadilla, Huesca, Aragon, Spain

- Flag Coat of arms
- Interactive map of Estadilla
- Country: Spain
- Autonomous community: Aragon
- Province: Huesca

Area
  - Total: 46 km^{2} (18 sq mi)

Population (2025-01-01)
  - Total: 810
  - Density: 18/km^{2} (46/sq mi)
- Time zone: UTC+1 (CET)
  - Summer (DST): UTC+2 (CEST)

Estadilla is a municipality located in the province of Huesca, Aragon, Spain. According to the 2018 census (INE), the municipality has a population of 794 inhabitants.

== See also ==
- List of municipalities in Huesca
