= Campo, Aragon =

Town in Aragon, Spain

Coordinates: 42°24′N 0°23′E

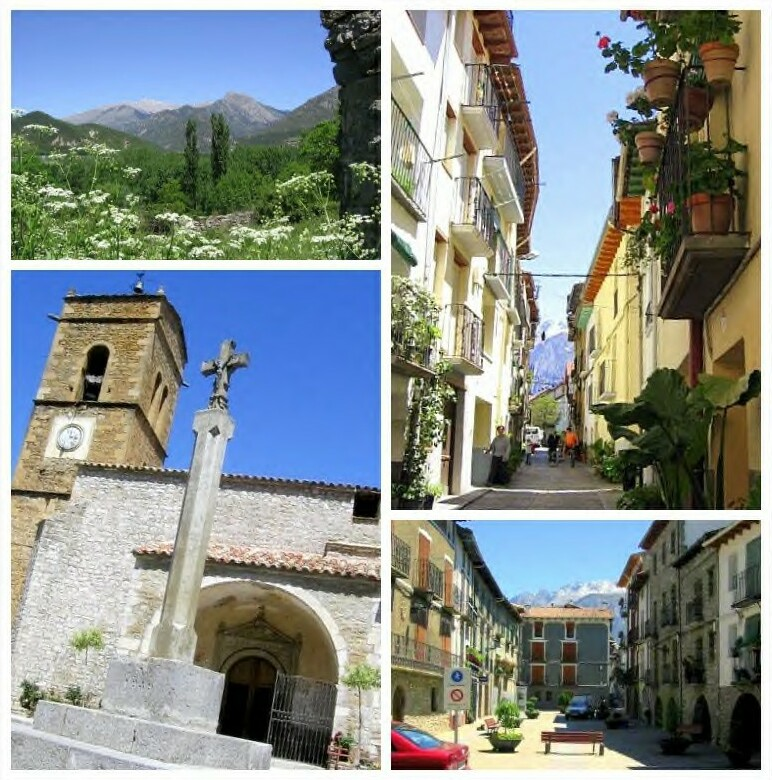

Campo (Spanish: [ˈkampo]; Catalan: [ˈkampu]) is a town in the county of Ribagorza, in the province of Huesca, in Aragon, Spain. Situated in a valley between 2 rivers, the Esera and Rialbo, it is surrounded by snow-capped Pyrenean mountain peaks: most notably, the Turbón (2.492 m) and Cotiella (2.912 m).

The town's municipal district includes the hamlet of Beleder, locally known as Belbedé, 2 km north of Campo.

Due to the landlock created by the mountains, the locals continue to speak the centuries-old Patues (Patois), colloquially known as "Fabla", a Ribagorçan dialect derived from Vulgar Latin, Navarro-Aragonese, southern Gascon, and Castilian.

It is also the birthplace of Gaspar Torrente (1888–1970), an early 20th Century promoter of Aragonese identity and nationalism and a founding father and leader of the Aragonese Nationalist party, 'Estado Aragonés'.

== See also ==
- List of municipalities in Huesca
