= Punta de Astorg =

Mountain in Spain

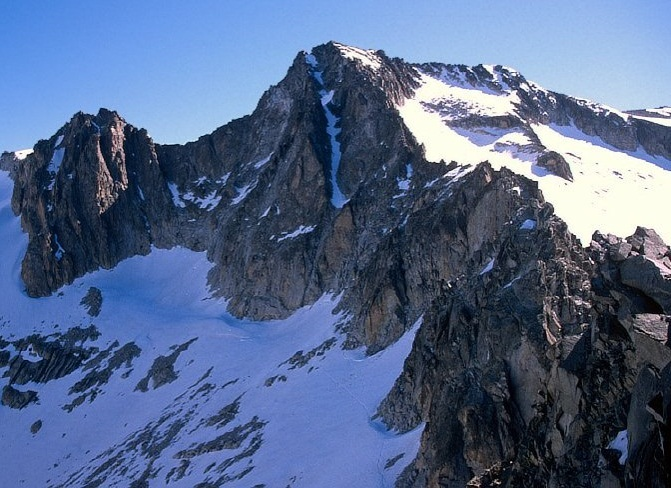
- View of Pico Maldito (centre) and Punta de Astorg (right) from Aiguille Juncadella, in June

Highest point
- Elevation: 3,354 m (11,004 ft)
- Prominence: 157 m (515 ft)
- Coordinates: 42°38′22″N 0°38′33″E

Naming
- Etymology: Count Réné d'Astorg
- English translation: Point of Astorg
- Language of name: Spanish

Geography
- Location within Pyrenees
- Location: Province of Huesca, Aragon, Spain
- Parent range: Spanish Pyrenees

Geology
- Rock age: Hercynian

Climbing
- First ascent: 9 July 1901
- Easiest route: via the Renclusa Refuge and the Aneto glacier

Point of Astorg (Aragonese: Punta d'Astorg, French: Pointe d'Astorg, Spanish: Punta de Astorg) is a peak in the Spanish Pyrenees which rises to 3,354 m above sea level, in the Maladeta massif. It is the second highest peak in the massif, after Aneto (3,404 m) and the fourth highest peak in the Pyrenees, behind Aneto, Pico Posets and Monte Perdido.

== Toponymy ==
The summit was called Lerilica Peak until it was climbed on July 9, 1901 by Count René d'Astorg (1860-1940), a French Pyrenean. The summit was renamed in his name.

Punta de Astorg is the highest point of a large ridge called Cresta Maldito in Spanish, literally "cursed ridge" in English. The first ascents in the Maladeta massif to overcome the Aneto were indeed the cause of several disasters in the glaciers. The death in 1824 in the bergschrund of the Maladeta glacier of Pierre Barrau of the Compagnie des guides de Luchon, caused real emotion among the local guides: the latter, already very frightened by the risks of the glacier, were then panicked by this massif which they now considered cursed.

== Geography ==
=== Location ===
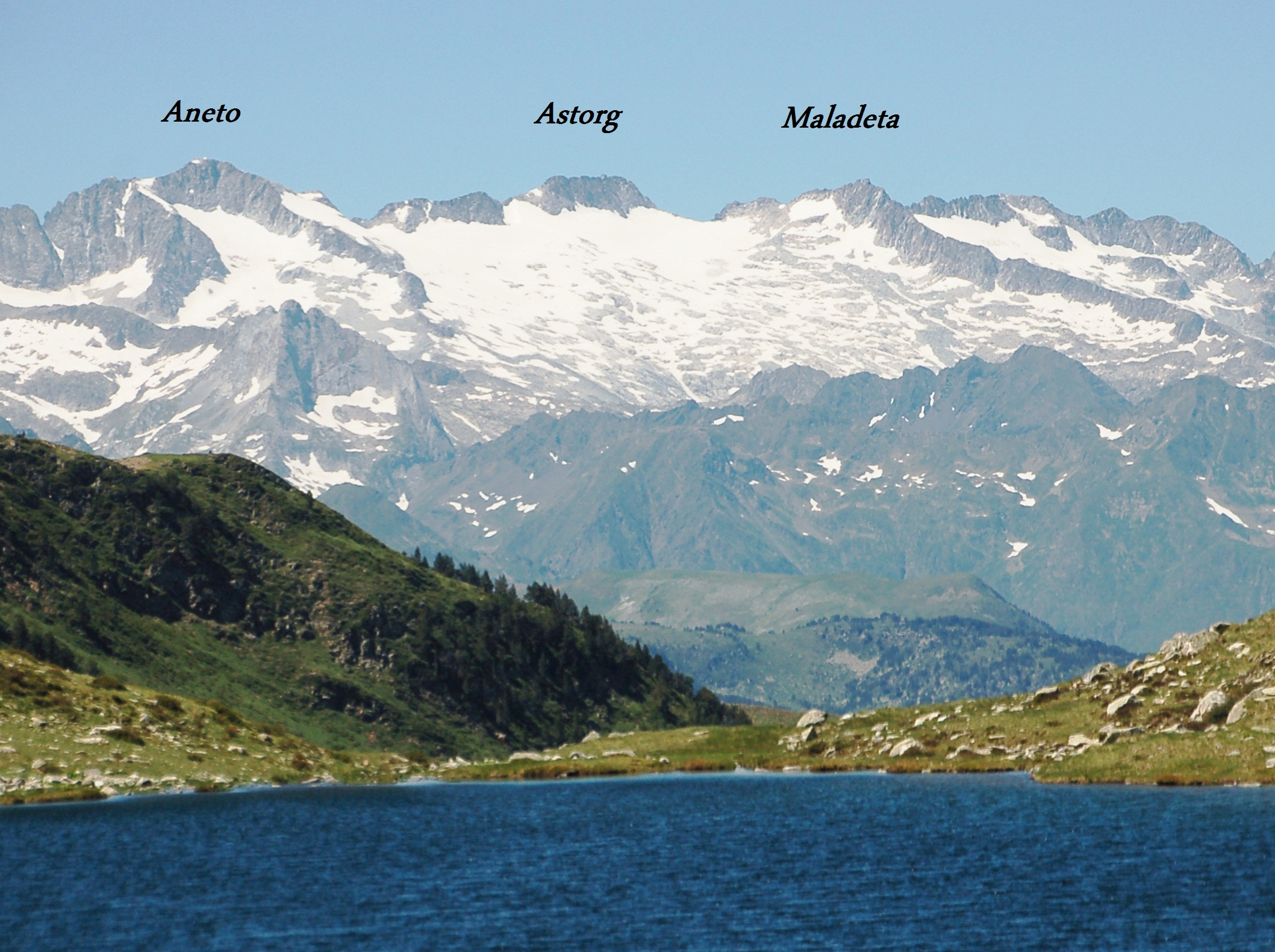
View of the Aneto, the Punta de Astorg, and the Maladeta.

Punta de Astorg is a peak in the Maladeta massif, in the Posets–Maladeta Natural Park, on the ridge separating the Vallibierna valley to the south and the Benasque valley to the north.

The summit overlooks the Coronas lakes and Ibon Maldito (2,970 m) to the north, which is the third highest lake in the Pyrenees. To the west is Lake Cregüena.

On its north face is the Aneto glacier, the largest glacier in the Pyrenees with an area of 64 hectares (160 acres) in 2007. The latter is in sharp decline due to climate change. During the last century it has lost more than half of its surface, and by 2050 it could disappear.

=== Topography ===
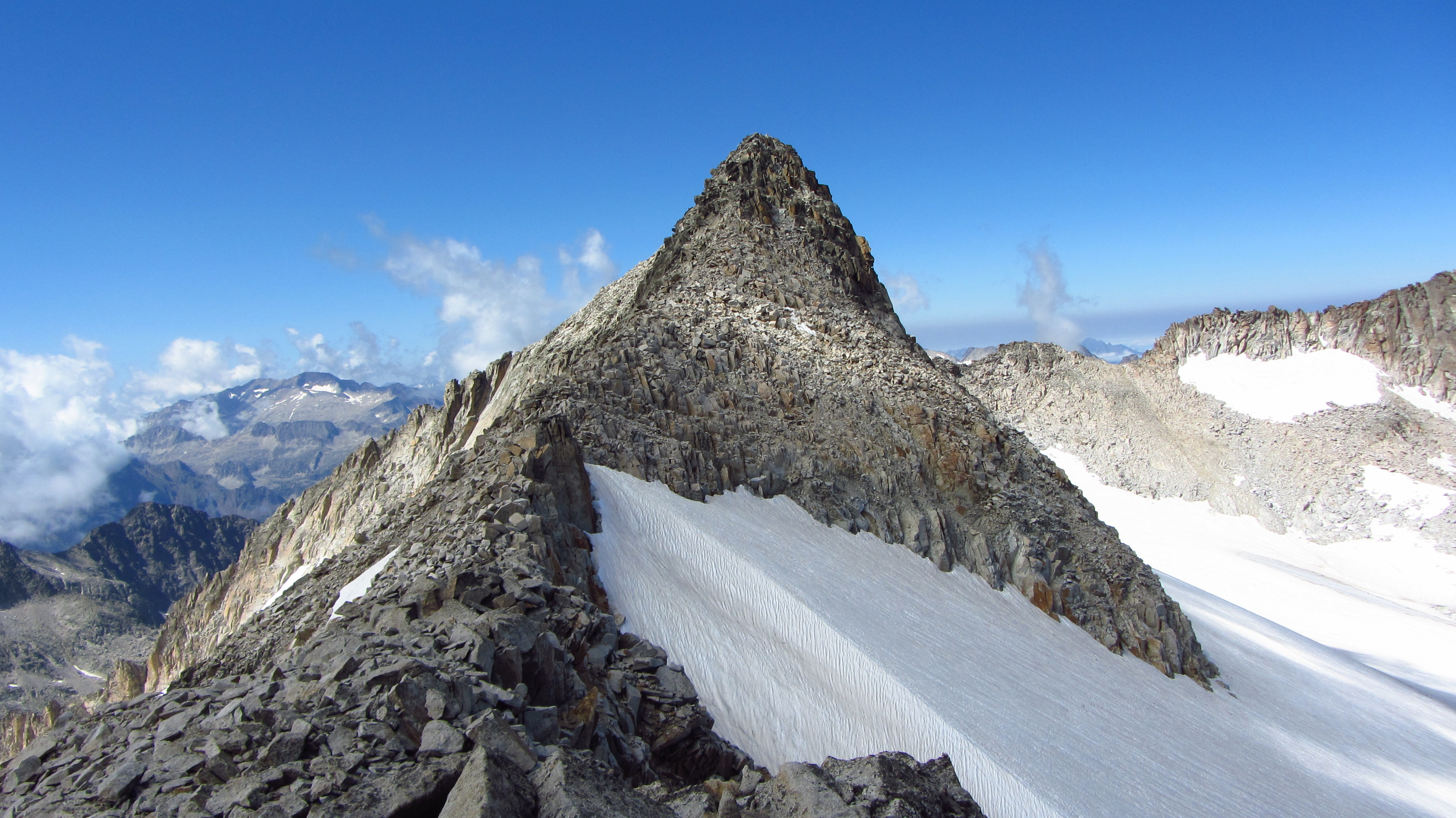
View of the southeast end of Cresta Maldito from Coronas Peak

Within the Maladeta massif, Punta de Astorg is located between the Maladeta and the Aneto. It is separated from the latter by a little individualized summit, the peak of Coronas (3,293 m and 30 meters in relative height).

It is the highest point of Cresta Maldito which is also known as Cresta del Medio, in reference to its central position between Aneto and Maladeta. This narrow ridge extends almost horizontally like a wall for more than 600 m, at an altitude of nearly 3,350 m, between its northwestern end called Pico Maldito (3,354 m) and its southeastern end called Pico del Medio (3,346 m).

Pico Maldito and Pico del Medio have negligible topographic prominence (about ten meters) and are therefore de facto anterior peaks of the Punta de Astorg according to the alpine criterion of bulletin 145 of the UIAA; but they are nevertheless listed in the UIAA list of Pyreneans three-thousanders as main summits. However, the northwest end (Pico Maldito) is a topographically important ridge knot, being at the intersection of Cresta Maldito, Cresta de Cregüena and Cresta de Los Portillones. North of Pico Maldito, there is a small peak classified in the UIAA list of Pyrenean three-thousanders as a secondary summit: the Aguja Schmidt-Endell (3,335 m); this summit, like the Pico Maldito and the Pico del Medio, also has an insignificant peak height (about ten meters).

Punta de Astorg has a peak height of 157 metres, making it a first-rate summit.

== History ==
The first ascent took place on July 9, 1901. René d'Astorg and Henri Brulle were accompanied by guides Célestin Passet and François Bernat-Salles. Punta de Astorg was therefore climbed late in the history of the Pyrenees: a century after Monte Perdido, which has the same altitude, and 60 years after that of Aneto.

Henri Béraldi recounts this first ascent in his book Cent Ans aux Pyrénées:

On Sunday July 8, Brulle and d'Astorg, having joined Luchon Célestin and Bernat, climbed to the Port de Venasque in two hours and two minutes from the Hospice and slept at Cabellud's. On Mondays, they leave at 5:20: Plan des Etangs, Portillon, crevasse-free glacier and attack on the Pic du Milieu through its middle. The bergschrund is easy, but the icy rocks above require great care. Summit - the real one - a megalithic monument: a large overhanging block and, placed on it, an obelisk. Only Pie du Portillon d'Oô is more sensational. Climbers stand on the obelisk, it is the complete ascent. Descent by the same path, with infinite precautions: it is really dangerous. If not for the bad weather, we would have tried to follow the ridge to Col Coroné. Big obstacles likely.

— Henri Beraldi, Cent Ans aux Pyrénées: Volume 7
