= Maladeta =

Mountain in the Pyrenees

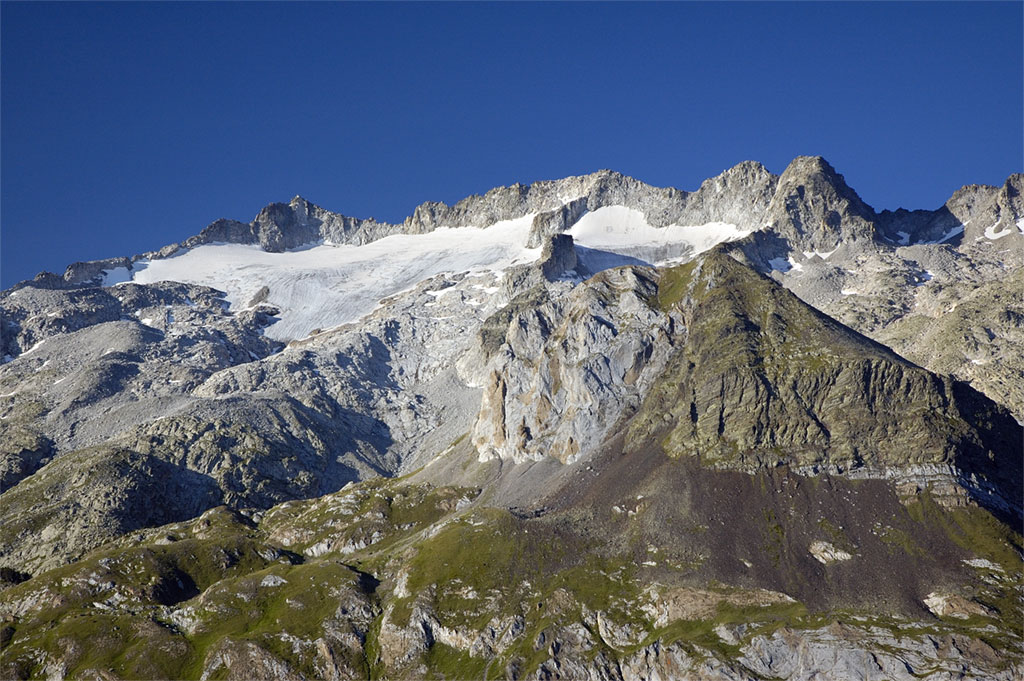
- Maladeta

Highest point
- Elevation: 3,312 m (10,866 ft)
- Listing: List of mountains in Aragon
- Coordinates: 42°38′50″N 0°38′22″E

Naming
- English translation: from "damned mountains"
- Language of name: Spanish

Geography
- Location within Pyrenees
- Location: Ribagorza, Aragon, Spain
- Parent range: Pyrenees

Climbing
- First ascent: 28 September 1817

Maladeta (3,312 m) is a mountain in the Pyrenees, close to the highest peak in the range, Aneto. It is located in the Natural Park of Posets-Maladeta in the town of Benasque in Province of Huesca, Aragon, Spain. Its northern slope contains the 37-hectare (91-acre) Maladeta Glacier, which is divided into the six-hectare (15-acre) Western Maladeta and the 31-hectare (77-acre) Eastern Maladeta.

Maladeta was previously considered to be highest peak in the area, and attempts to reach its summit took priority over the other peaks in the range. The first successful ascent of the peak was made by Johann Jacob Friedrich Wilhelm Parrot with guide Pierre Barrau in 1817.

== Etymology ==
The name "Maladeta" comes from the Spanish montes malditos, which means "Damned Mountains". According to some authorities the local name for the massif was Mala hita ("bad rocks" or "bad upper regions"). When French travellers came to the region they translated the name into the French as "Maladette", on the basis that it was cognate with the Italian term Maladetta (feminine form of "damned"). Subsequently, the mountain became known as Maladeta, a term that encompasses the entire massif.

== History ==
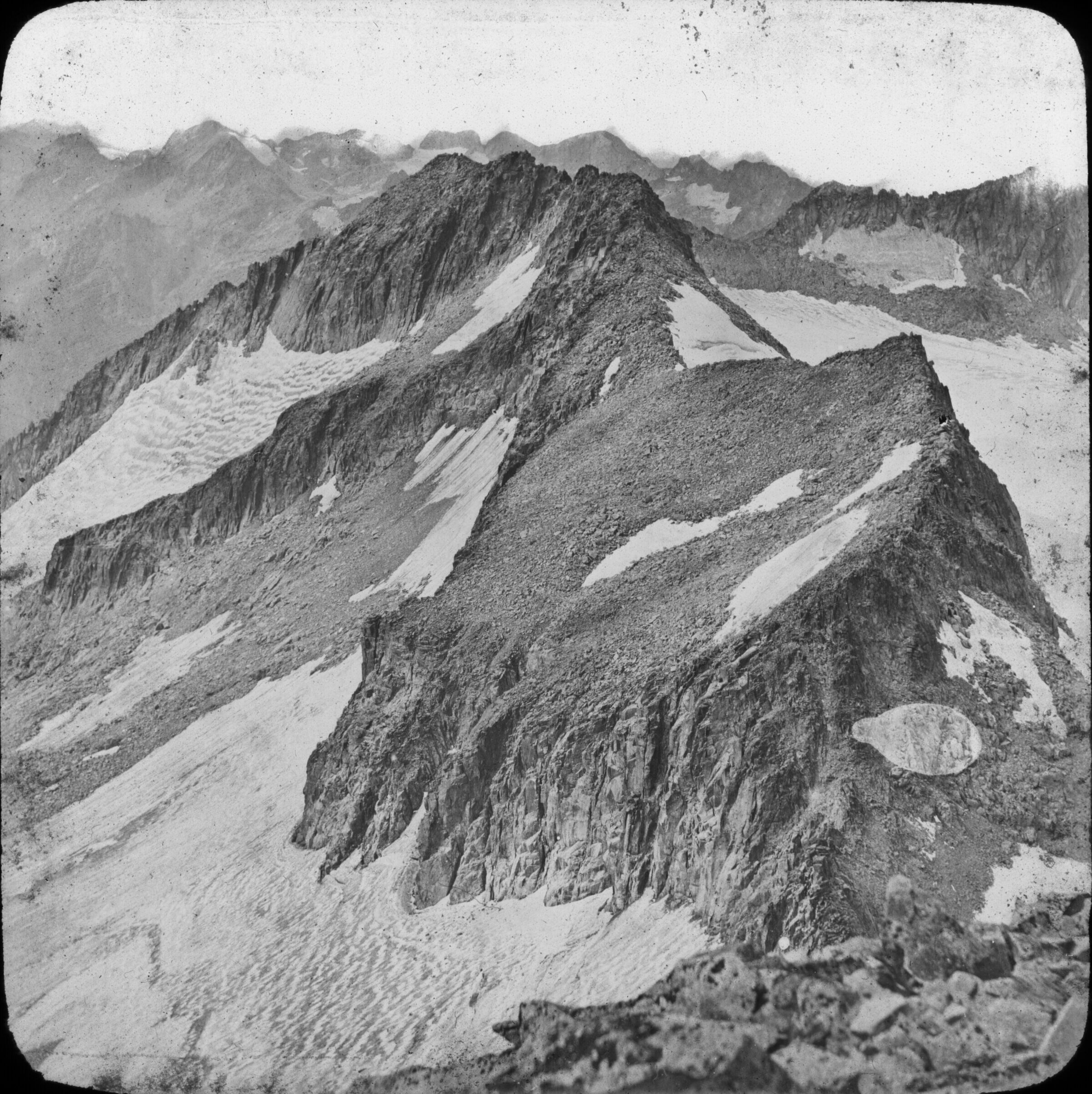
The peak of Coronas, with Medio and Maldito, with Maladeta to the far right, taken from the summit of Aneto

While not the highest peak in the local group of mountains, Maladeta was named for the entire group, which is also called Montes Malditos. It attracted the most interest from climbers, especially in the early nineteenth century, as its summit appears in the foreground from the natural entrance to the valley via the port of Benasque or when arriving from France. From this vantage point, the Cresta Portillones hides the true height of its eastern neighbour Aneto, which is taller and has more extensive glaciers. The first attempts to reach the peak were by Ramond in 1787, Ferrieres in 1801, and Louis Cordier in 1802. It wasn't until German naturalist Johann Jacob Friedrich Wilhelm Parrot, with guide Pierre Barrau, climbed to the summit of the mountain on 28 September 1817 that Aneto was discovered to be higher.

Pierre Barrau, considered to be the leading expert in the area, was killed in a crevice of the Maladeta glacier in 1824. As a result, locals became fearful of venturing out on the ice, considering it cursed. The movement of the glacier in 1931 exposed the body.

In the early twentieth century, the Refugio de la Renclusa mountain hut was opened. It has a capacity of 93 and is the most common starting point for climbing the Aneto. It is located 2,140 m (7,021 ft) above sea level and is accessed via a path that leaves from the La Besurta recreational area. Due to the variety of wildlife in the valleys and the sensitivity of its glaciers (the most southerly in Europe), Maladeta was declared a natural park in 1994, together with the entire range, and part of the Pyrenean Glaciers Natural Monument.

== Geography ==
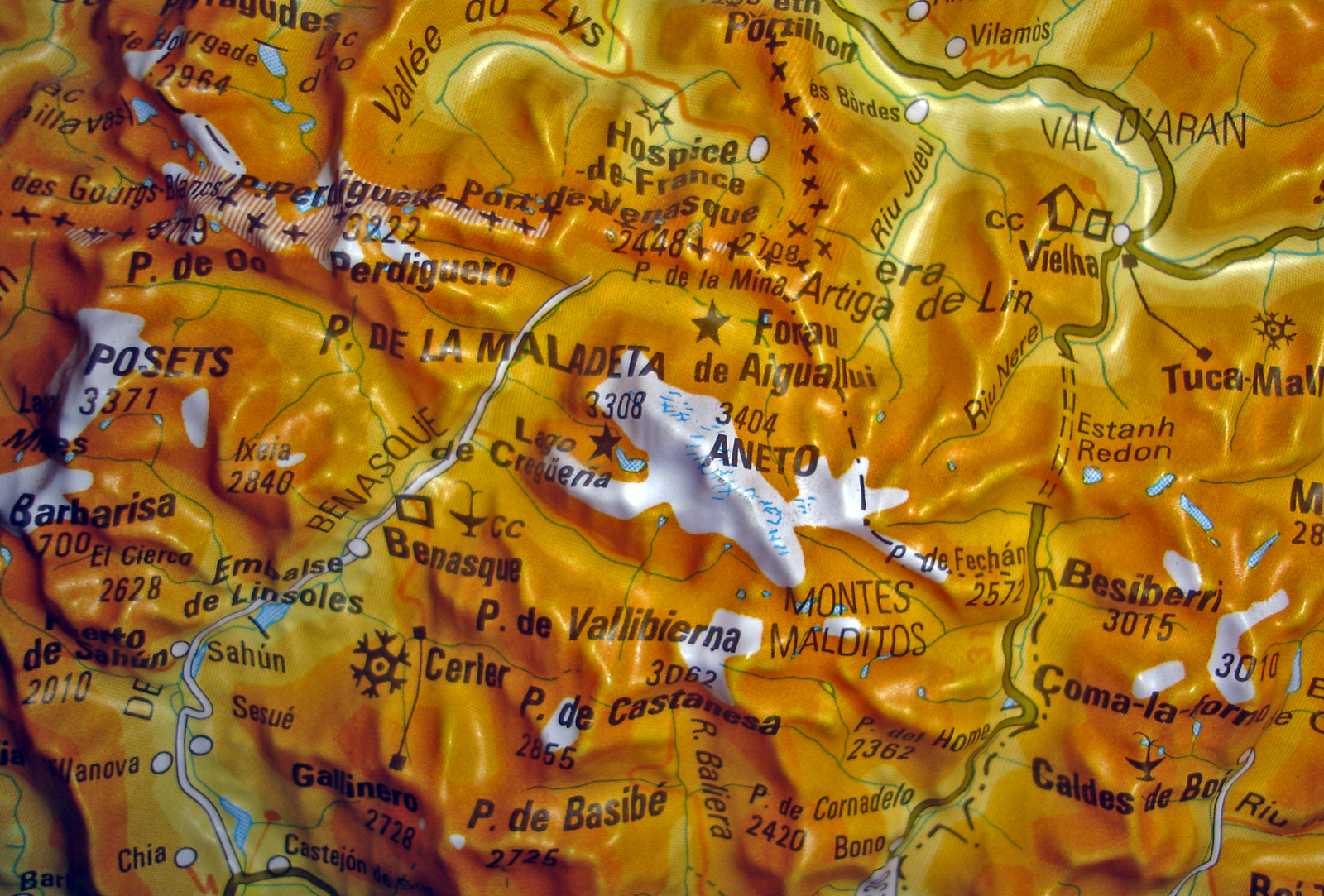
Map of the Maladeta range, and the valleys and mountains surrounding it

Maladeta rises to 3,308 metres (10,853 ft) above sea level in the heart of the Pyrenees along the border between France and Spain. The summit is located northeast of the Province of Huesca and occupies the centre of the Montes Malditos. It is connected to Aneto to the east by a 3,000-metre (9,800 ft) row of peaks called the Cresta del Medio (Pico Maldito, Pico del Medio, Pico de Coronas), which, along with the crest of the Portillones, give the appearance of being solid.

The snow from its slopes feeds the headwaters of the Ésera and Ballibierna rivers, both on the south side.

The Maladeta range is surrounded by valleys. A hill of over 8,200 feet (2,500 m), crowned by the Perdiguero, separates the valley of Arán from France. The wider and more compact Spanish side, which is less accessible, is separated from the foothills by the gorges and ravines of the Posets and Maladeta mountain ranges. The Cerler alpine ski resort lies two valleys further south.

== Climbing routes ==
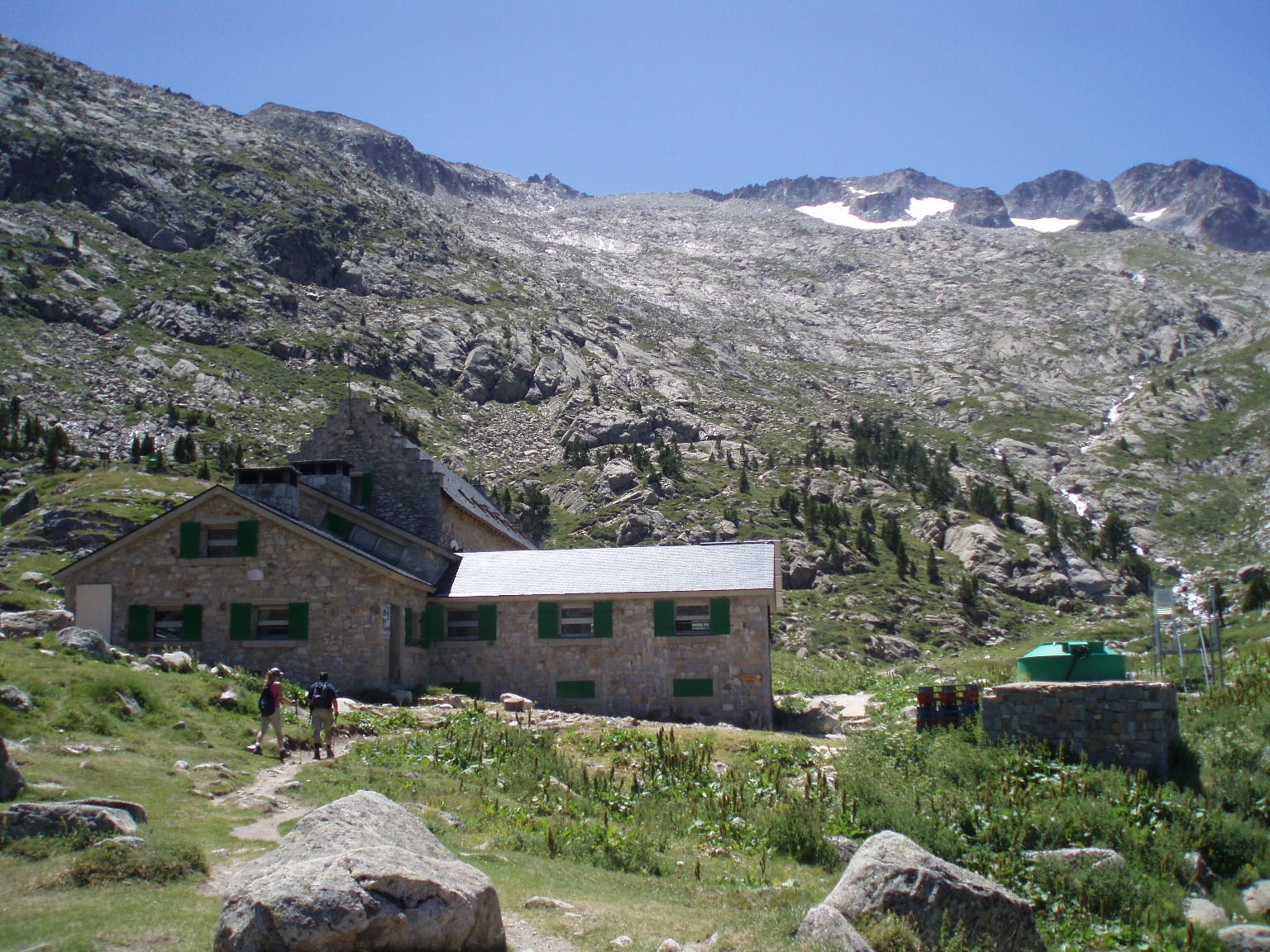
La Renclusa mountain hut

The normal route of ascent is common to both Maladeta and Aneta up to the height of the upper Portillón. There one continues in a straight line to the bottom of the crest of the Maladeta, which is accessible via a steep passage to a very distinctive and visible rock. The route into the corridor can be very hazardous because a deep bergschrund that usually opens in the glacier following the winter. Ascents of the mountain are only recommended for experienced climbers.

The mountain hut La Renclusa, located in the foothills at 2,500-metre (8,200 ft), is the usual starting point for ascents of Maladeta and Aneto.

== See also ==
- List of Pyrenean three-thousanders
