= Renclusa Refuge =

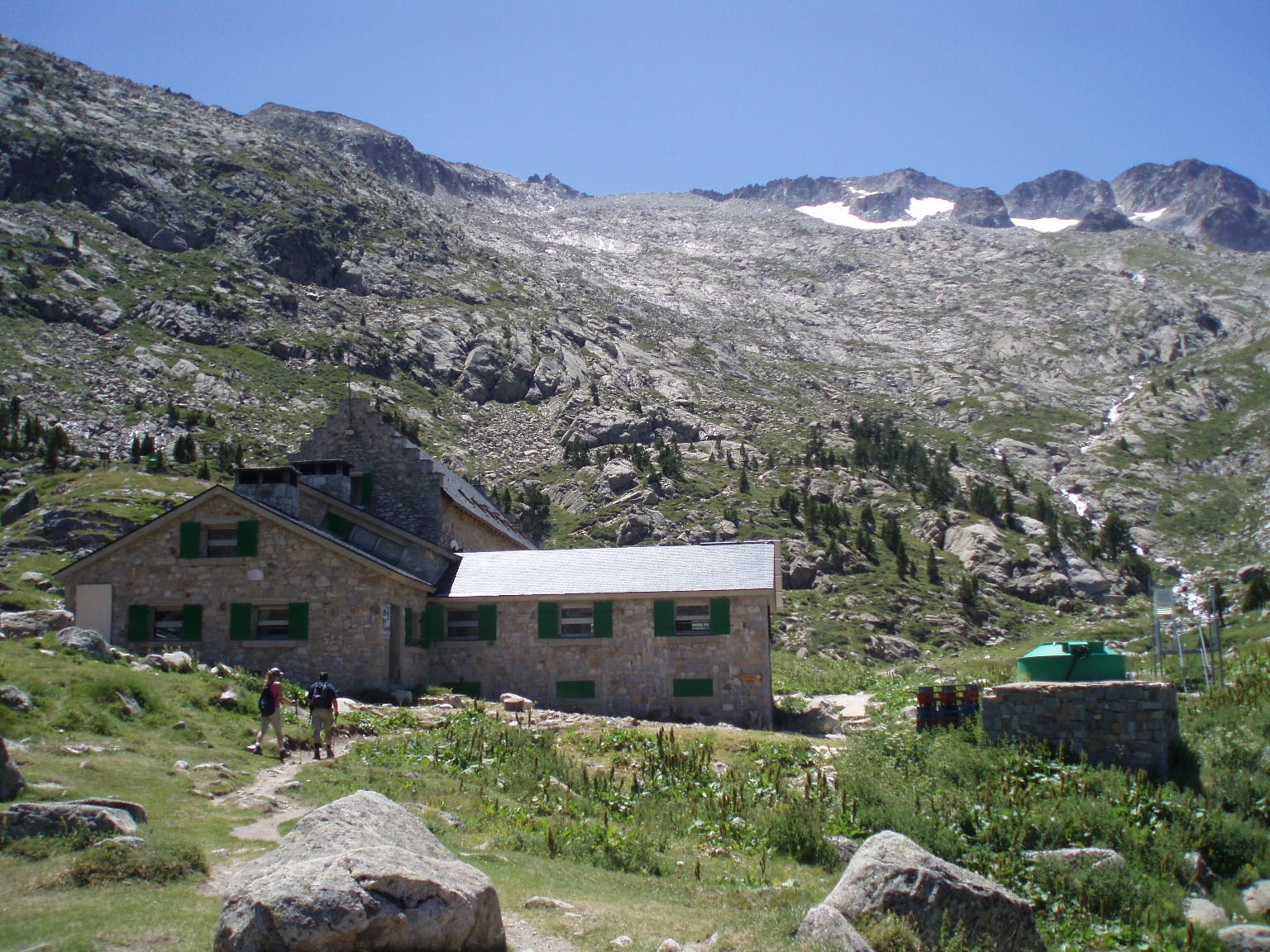
- Renclusa Refuge. Above, the ridges of Maladeta
- Interactive map of the Renclusa Refuge area

General information
- Coordinates: 42.669283°N 0.650758°E
- Elevation: 2,140 m (7,020 ft)
- Year built: 1916

The Renclusa refuge (Spanish: Refugio de la Renclusa) is a refuge located in the Spanish Pyrenees at the base of the massif de la Maladeta, at 2,140 m (7,020 ft) high, in the Ésera valley. It is the starting point for excursions to the summit of la Maladeta, of the monts Maudits and Aneto (highest point in the Pyrenees). It lies in the commune of Benasque, north-east of Huesca province, Aragon (Spain).

== History ==
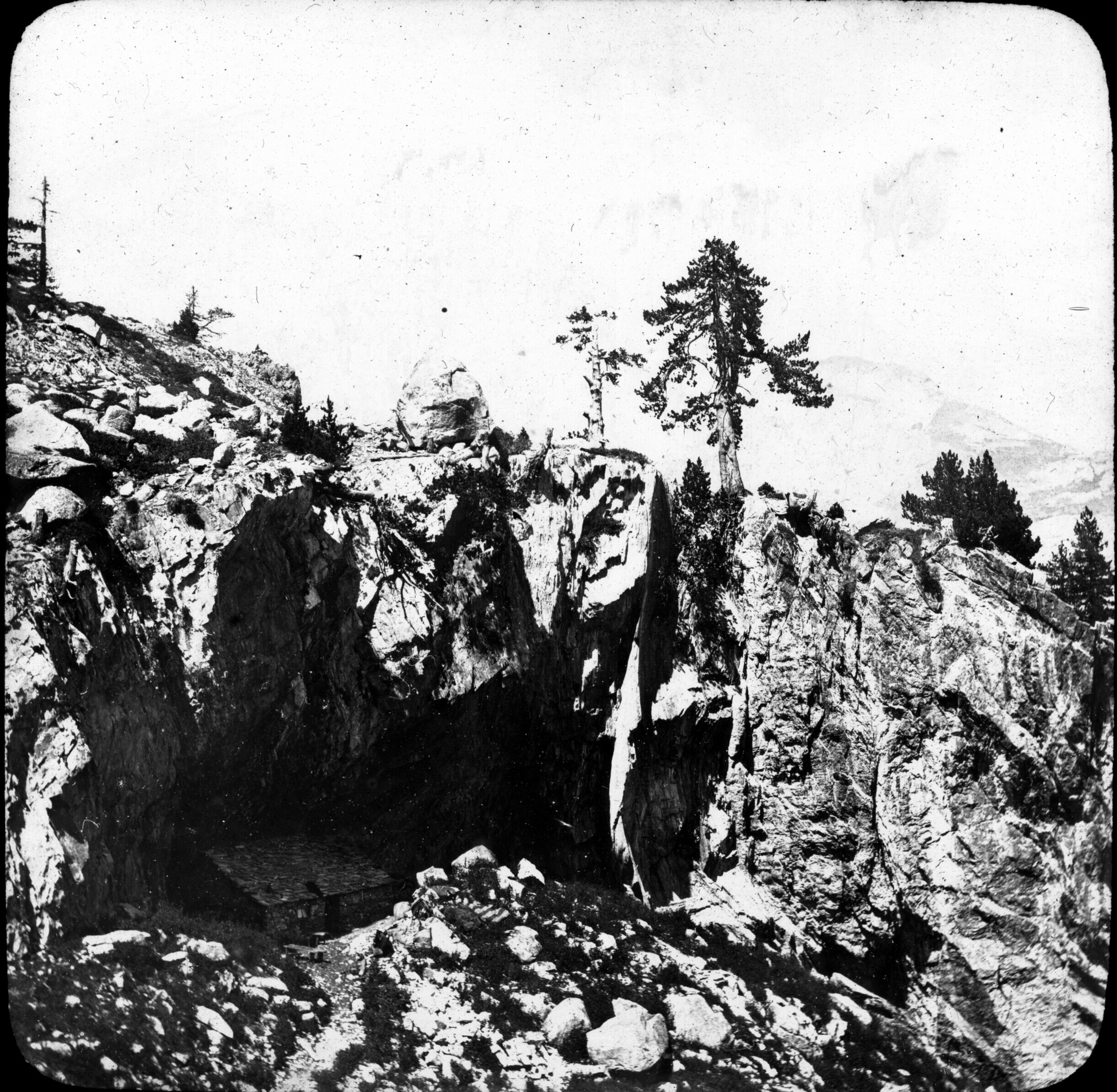
1895 : the shepherd's hut

The refuge's name comes from the Pico de la Renclusa above it, at 2,700 m (8,900 ft). It was originally a shelter under rock, then a shepherd's hut, which was used as a shelter by Platon Tchikhatchov, Albert de Franqueville and guides Pierre Sanio, Jean Sors (nicknamed "Argarot"), Pierre Redonnet ("Nate") and Bernard Arrazau ("Ursule"), during their first ascension of the Aneto in July 1842.

Later, engineer and Catalan pyreneeist Juli Soler i Santaló (1865-1914) built a small 4x3 m house, near its current location, which he named villa Maladeta, and he draughted the future refuge.

The refuge was inaugurated in 1916. It had 22 beds and was kept by Antonio Abadias. It rapidly became one of the most frequented refuges in the Pyrenees. The Spanish Civil War interrupted its activity, and it wasn't until 1951 that a new refuge, restored and enlarged, came to be. After Antonio Abadias' death, Benasquan Antonio Garié succeeded him in 1966.

== Access and services ==
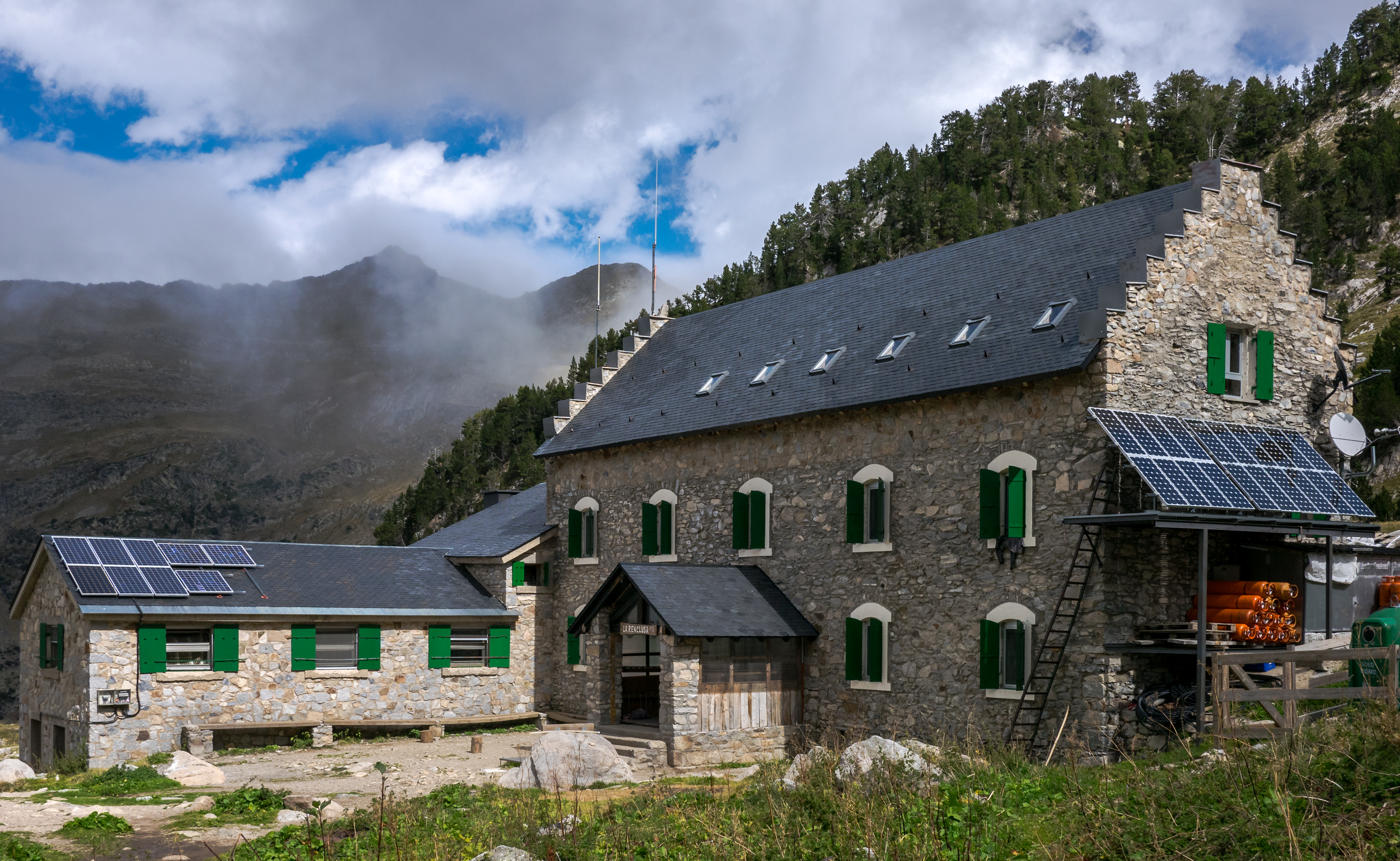
Renclusa refuge

Today the refuge offers around 110 places and is one of the biggest in the Pyrenees. It is kept from the end of June to the end of September and is open weekends during the skiing period. It is managed by the Aragonese Mountain Federation (FAM) and the Excursionist Centre of Catalonia (CEC). One can get there from Benasque (about an hour's walk from Besurta car park) and from France, from Bagnères-de-Luchon, by the port de Venasque.
