= Posets =

Posets may refer to:

- Posets peak, a mountain, second highest of the Pyrenees
- Partially ordered sets, a set which follows partial order relation
- Poset games, mathematical games of strategy

== See also ==
- Posets-Maladeta Natural Park, in province of Huesca, Aragón, Spain
