= Cerler =

Ski resort in Huesca, Spain

Coordinates: 42°35′36″N 0°32′18″E

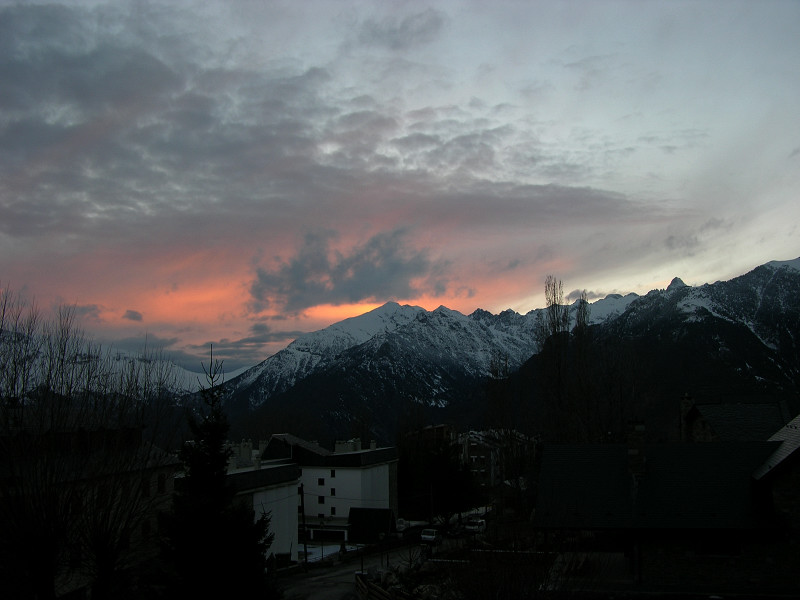
- Sunset view of the resort town.

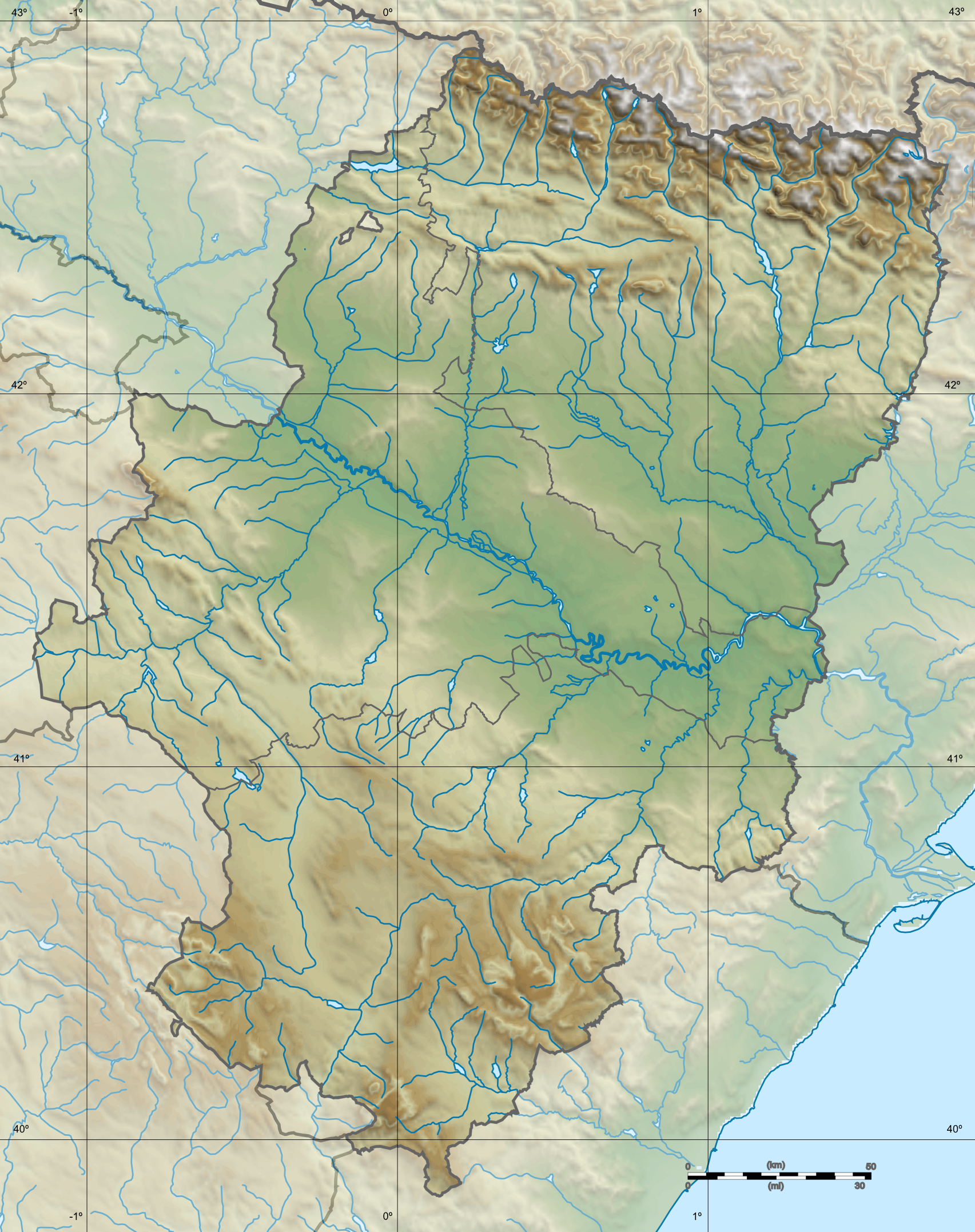
- Location within Spain Location within Aragon Location within Pyrenees
- Location: Pyrenees, Spain
- Nearest city: Benasque
- Top elevation: 2,650 m (8,690 ft)
- Base elevation: 1,500 m (4,900 ft)
- Skiable area: 72 km (45 mi)
- Trails: 65
- Lift system: 9 chair lifts. 5 ski tows. 5 magic carpet lifts.
- Website: http://www.cerler.com

Cerler, officially called Aramón Cerler, is a Spanish ski resort situated above the village of Cerler in the high Benasque Valley, near the town of Benasque in the central Pyrenees (province of Huesca, Spain). Near Cerler are the highest peaks of the Pyrenees, Aneto, Monte Perdido, and Posets.

== Resort ==
Former Cerler logo

Cerler has 72 km of marked pistes and is one of the highest resorts of the Pyrenees. The highest point is 'Gallinero' peak, at 2650 m AMSL, giving a vertical drop of 1150 m.

Cerler village, situated at 1500 m AMSL, forms the base of the resort and comprises a traditional nucleus and a purpose-built extension that includes several hotels and apartment complexes. From there a 4-seat chair lift provides the main access for the resort. The resort itself occupies two different high mountain valleys, defining two sectors: Cerler and Ampriu. Each sector is accessible by road and has a parking area, both sectors are linked by chair lifts.

=== Lifts ===
Almost all of the resort's lifts are modern and of high capacity, the resort has:

- 9 chair lifts.
- 5 ski tows.
- 5 magic carpet lifts.
- total skiers: 24,800/hour

=== Pistes ===
The resort offers 65 pistes of different difficulties:

- 7 beginners.
- 16 easy.
- 25 intermediate.
- 14 expert.

=== Services ===
- 4 restaurants.
- 3 skiing school.
- 1 snow gardens for children.
- 1 kindergarten
- 2 ski hiring stores.
