= René d'Astorg =

French Pyreneist

Personal information
- Nationality: French
- Born: October 29, 1860
- Died: December 28, 1940 (aged 80) Pau, Pyrénées-Atlantiques

Climbing career
- Major ascents: Pointe d'Astorg

Count René d'Astorg, born on 29 October 1860 and died in Pau on 28 December 1940, is a French Pyreneist.

== Biography ==
His family descended from an old Spanish family, long established in Guyenne, settled in Pau. He studied law and very early on became passionate about exploring the Pyrenees.

Linked with Count Henry Russell and with Henri Brulle and Roger de Monts, the pioneers of "The difficulty Pyreneism", he achieved many firsts:

First ascents
Date of ascent	Peak	Partners
August 2, 1892	Petit Astazou	Henri Brulle, Célestin Passet, Henri Courtade
August 11, 1893	Grand Gabietou (3034 m)	Henri Brulle, Célestin Passet, Henri Courtade
August 7, 1895	Pic Rouge de Pailla	Henri Brulle, Célestin Passet
August 14, 1895	Pic du Taillon (3144 m)	Henri Brulle, Célestin Passet
July 30, 1896	Grand Pic d'Ossau	Henri Brulle, Célestin Passet
August 14, 1896	Pinède (2860 m)	Henri Brulle, Célestin Passet
August 9, 1897	North face of Mont-Perdu (3355 m)	Henri Brulle, Célestin Passet, Forbes Morgan, François Bernat-Salles
August 18, 1900	Pic Occidental du Lac	Henri Brulle
July 9, 1901	Pointe d'Astorg (3355 m)	Henri Brulle, Célestin Passet, François Bernat-Salles
August 3, 1901	Balaïtous (3144 m)	Henri Brulle, Célestin Passet
July 25, 1902	Petit Encantat	Henri Brulle, Germain Castagné
July 17, 1903	Tour de Campo	Henri Brulle, Germain Castagné
July 18, 1903	Bassiero Ouest	Henri Brulle, Germain Castagné

The library of Pau keeps the manuscript of his diary (1885).
