= Pico Maldito =

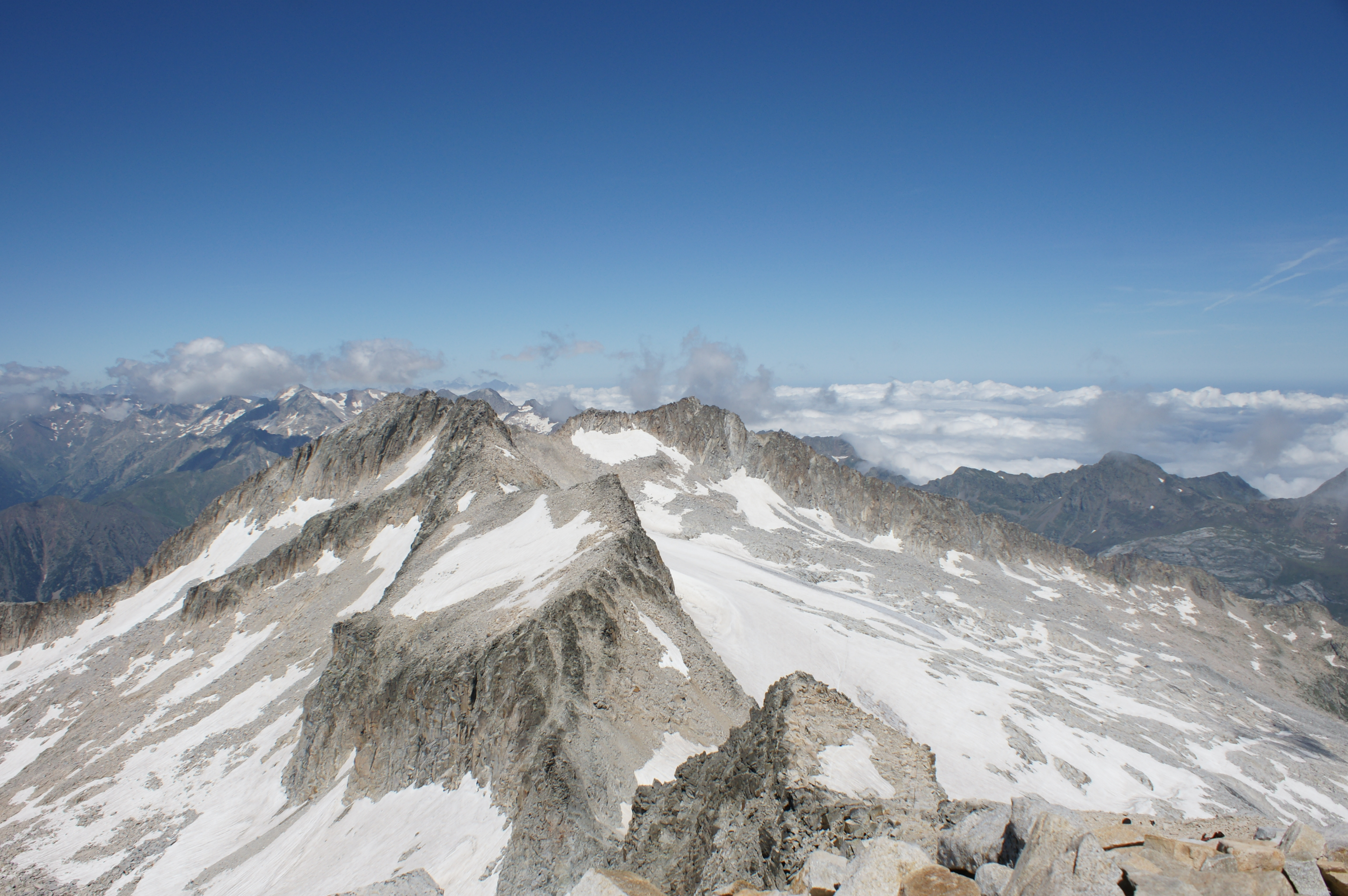

Highest point
- Elevation: 3,350 m (10,990 ft)
- Listing: List of mountains in Spain
- Coordinates: 42°38′23″N 0°38′24″E

Geography
- Location within Spain
- Location: Spain
- Autonomous community: Aragon
- Province: Huesca
- Parent range: Pyrenees

Pico Maldito (lit. 'cursed peak') is the fourth highest peak in the Pyrenees, with an altitude of 3350 meters above sea level.

It is located in the Posets-Maladeta Natural Park, in the municipality of Benasque, province of Huesca, Aragon, Spain. It is part of the Macizo de la Maladeta, located in the Benasque Valley area, is made up of Paleozoic soils of a granite nature and Mesozoic materials.
