= Pic de Vallibierna =

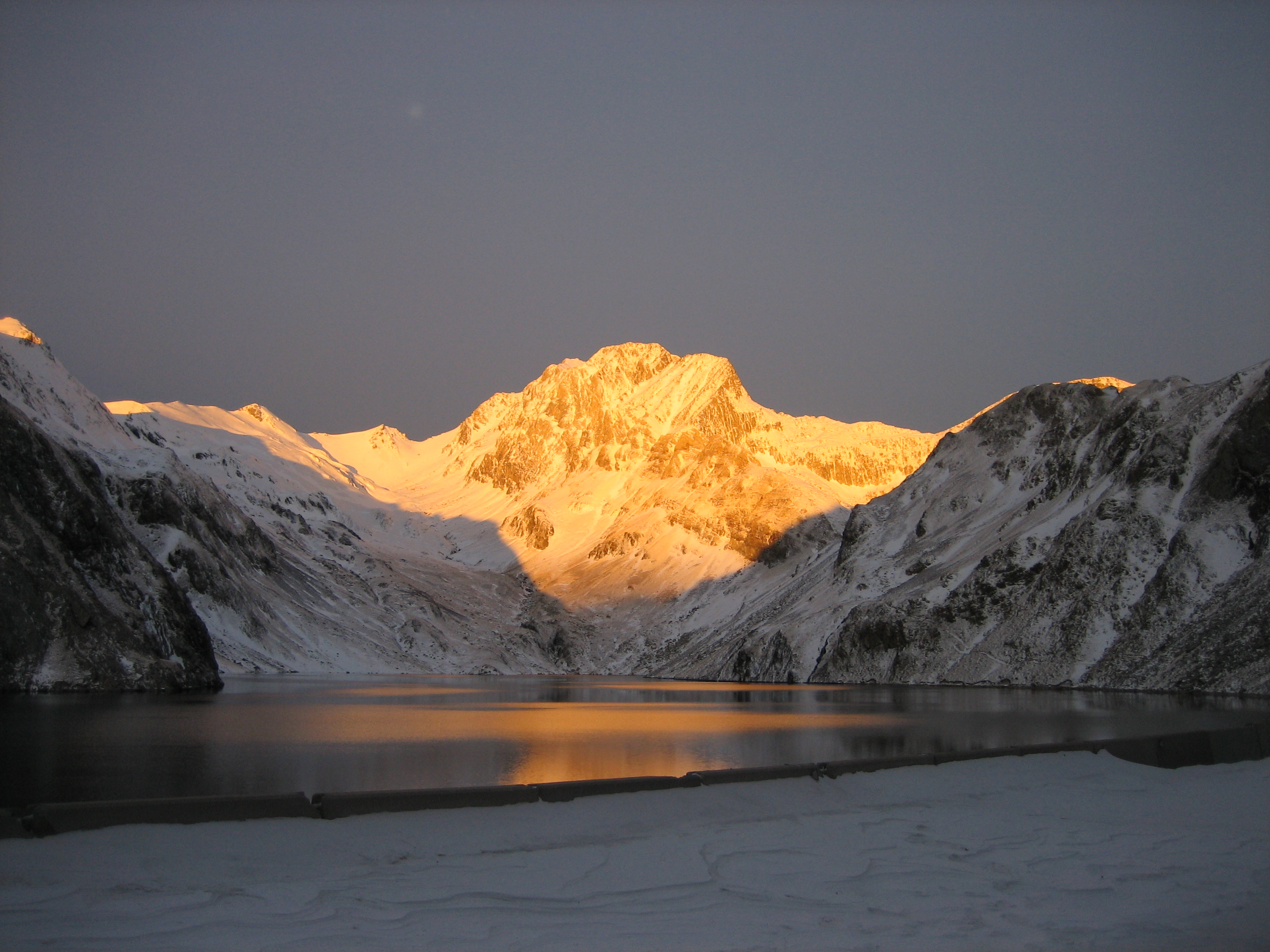

Highest point
- Elevation: 3,067 m (10,062 ft)
- Listing: List of Pyrenean three-thousanders
- Coordinates: 42°35′42″N 0°39′18″E

Geography
- Location within Pyrenees
- Location: Huesca, Aragon, Spain
- Parent range: Massif de la Maladeta; Pyrenees

The Pic de Vallibierna, culminating at 3,067 m (10,062 ft), together with the tuc Culebras 3,062 m (10,046 ft) forms a massif located south of the massif de la Maladeta, in the Spanish Pyrenees (Aragon province). The crest separating both summits is nicknamed the horse step.
