= Gran Encantat =

Gran Encantat and Petit Encantat
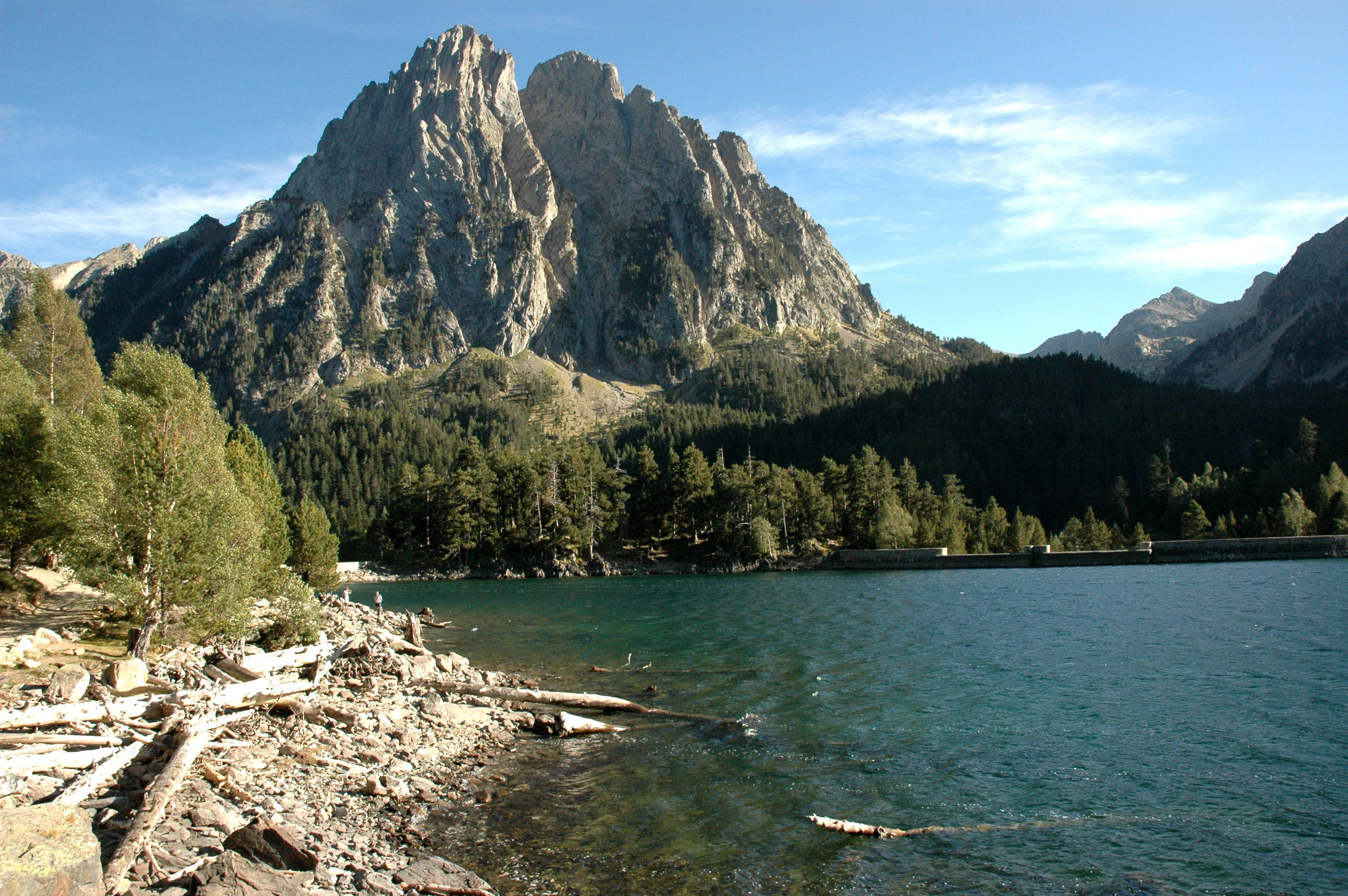

Highest point
- Elevation: 2,748 m (9,016 ft)
- Listing: List of mountains in Catalonia
- Coordinates: 42°34′11″N 01°00′56″E

Geography
- Location within Pyrenees
- Location: Catalonia, Spain
- Parent range: Pyrenees

Gran Encantat is a mountain peak of Catalonia, Spain. Located in the Pyrenees, it is the higher of the two peaks (the other being the Petit Encantat) of the Els Encantats mountain, with an altitude of 2,748 metres (9,016 ft) above sea level. It is the tallest point on the Els Encantas twin peaks, the shorter being Petit Encantat, which at 2,733 metres (8,967 ft) is only 12 metres (39 ft) shorter than Gran Encantat. Gran Encantat towers over the picturesque reservoir of Estany de Sant Maurici, and to the east Pica d'Estats (the tallest mountain in Catalonia) can be seen. Gran Encantat is also a climbing destination, with many people climbing, hiking and scrambling in the summer. The mountain is ideal for these activities as it is around 5 kilometres from the small town of Espot. The route from Espot is easily walkable alongside the Riu Escrita river which runs through a classic Pyrenean valley.

== Description ==
The mountain has a jagged shape with two rocky peaks which make up Els Encantats. Said peaks are separated by a gorge that runs down the middle of the massif. The barren and rugged landscape makes way for pine forests as the altitude decreases. Northwest of the mountain, the Estany de Sant Maurici reservoir lies: a lake which sometimes appears turquoise in summer.

== Geology ==
Gran Encantat consists of metamorphic rocks, which come from the transformation of sedimentary rocks through high temperature and pressure. Petrographically, the Escrita valley is formed by the sam granite of the Pyrenean axis; but these two peaks are made of folded slate and calcareous rock.

== Etymology ==
The name comes, like that of many other mountains, from an ancient legend. It seems that two hunters, one Sunday morning, wanting to be the first to hunt down the chamois, did not attend Sunday mass, for which they were cursed, remaining petrified forever, turned into those two vertical peaks.

== Mountaineering ==
The first ascents of the Gran Encantado, by the normal route, carried out in 1901, are attributed to Negrín, Romeo, Salles and Ciffre, according to the Pyrenean Patrice de Bellefont. The Enchanted Little One was climbed, the following year, by Astorg, Castagne and Brulle. According to Bellefont, also the Central Canal (currently the normal route in winter), was traced for the first time in 1936, by the Italian climber Emilio Comici.

However, in Catalonia, it is traditionally considered that Mosén Jaime Oliveras was the first to climb this mountain (the Great Enchanted) in 1910. The truth is that, in the summer of 1911 and alone, he climbed the Little Enchanted, having to overcome infinite difficulties and running obvious dangers. This rise had an impact that the others did not, possibly because of the popularity that Oliveras enjoyed among the society of the time.4

Today there are many mountaineers or climbers who try any of the normal routes of ascent. The busiest is that of Gran Encantado, through the Monestero valley, with a graduation of "not very difficult", despite the fact that some sections are quite risky and dangerous. The Little Enchanted One is usually climbed from the gorge, but the climb of these 100 meters is classified as "very difficult" (4th degree steps) since it is a vertical rock wall that is not very safe. The descent is done by abseiling (double rope) by the same route by which it has been climbed.
