= Aneto =

Highest mountain in the Pyrenees

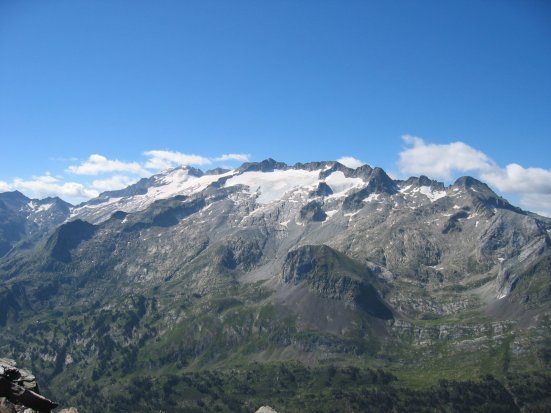
- North face of Aneto

Highest point
- Elevation: 3,404 m (11,168 ft); ETRS89
- Prominence: 2,812 m (9,226 ft); Ranked 123rd
- Isolation: 507 km (315 mi) to Roche de la Muzelle
- Listing: Mountains of Spain 3rd Mountains of Aragon 1st Ultra
- Coordinates: 42°37′56″N 00°39′28″E

Geography
- Location within Pyrenees
- Location: Ribagorza, Aragon, Spain
- Parent range: Pyrenees

Climbing
- First ascent: July 20, 1842
- Easiest route: Basic snow/ice climb

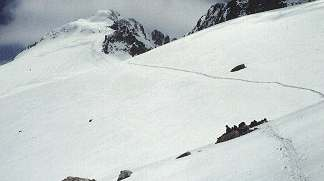
Aneto's summit and glacier seen from the upper Portillon

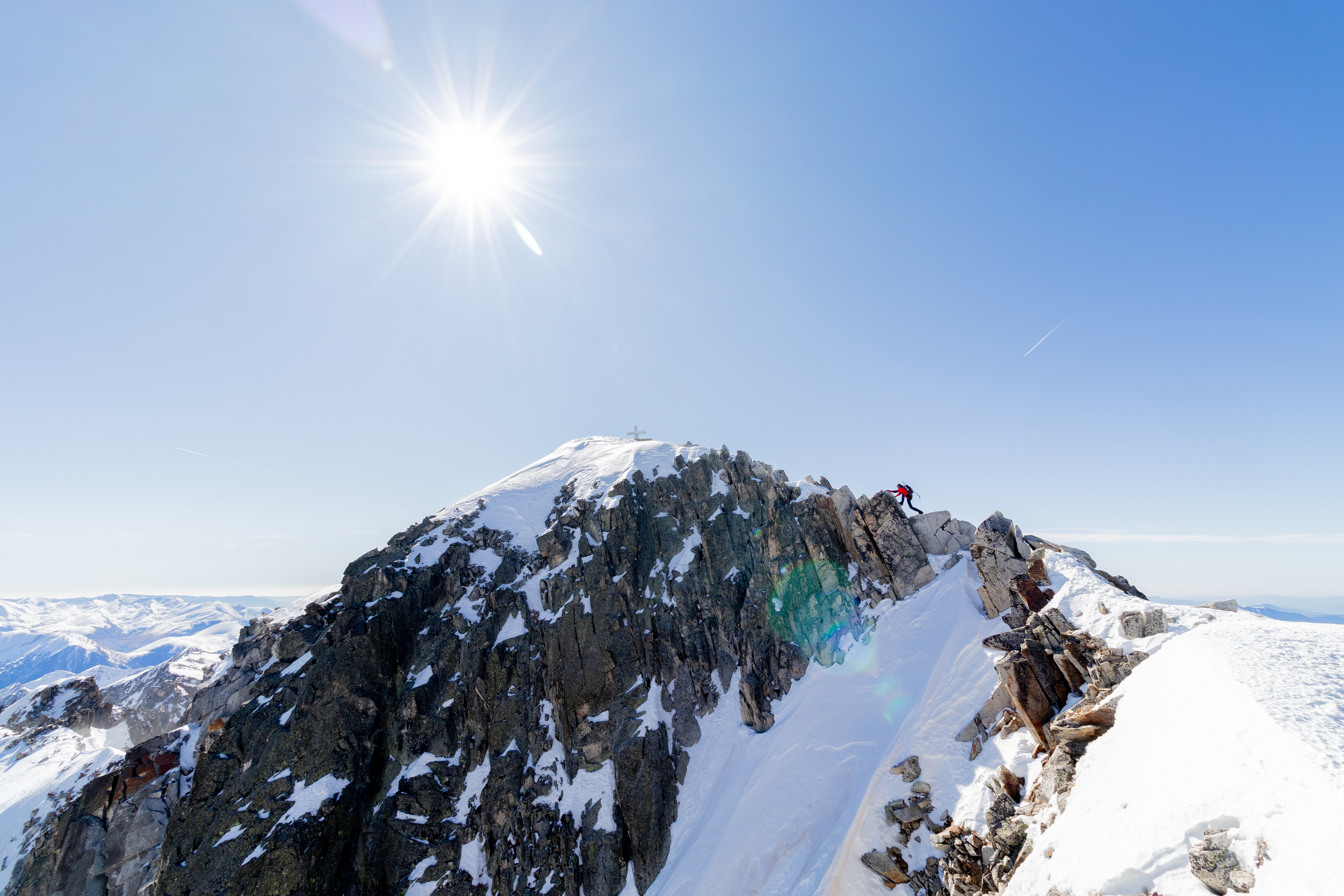
Mountaineer on the last stretch to Aneto' summit, Mohammed's Pass

Aneto is the highest mountain in the Pyrenees and in Aragon, Spain's third-highest mountain, reaching a height of 3,404 metres (11,168 feet). It is in the Spanish province of Huesca, the northernmost of three Aragonese provinces, 6 kilometres (4 miles) south of the France–Spain border. It forms the southernmost part of the Maladeta massif.

Aneto is located in the Posets-Maladeta Natural Park, in the municipality of Benasque, Huesca province, an autonomous community of Aragon, Spain. It is part of the Maladeta massif and is located in the Benasque valley. It consists of Paleozoic terrain of a granitic nature and Mesozoic materials. Its northern side holds the largest glacier in the Pyrenees, covering 79.6 hectares (197 acres) in 2005; it is shrinking rapidly due to warming summer temperatures and decreasing winter precipitations over the 20th century – it covered 106.7 ha in 1981, and over 200 ha in the 19th century. It is estimated that it has lost more than half of its surface in the last 100 years, and may disappear around 2050. Shrinkage has continued at an increasing rate, reducing to 69.3 ha in 2011 and 50.0 ha in 2020 (and reducing in thickness by 8.5 metres in this period), and to 48.1 ha in 2022.

== Toponym ==
Initially, the mountain did not even have a name. There are indications that the shepherds and hunters from the southern valleys referred to it as Malheta or Malahita or Punta. It was also previously known as La Malahite. The first traveller who is recorded as having seen it from the port (or pass) of Benasque, Louis Ramond de Carbonnières, simply described its appearance as "needles of ice" in 1787.

The highest point of the Pyrenees eventually inherited the name of a village on its south-eastern side, Aneto. The French, on hearing the Aragonese pronunciation of "Aneto", retained the last two clearly accentuated phonetic syllables, "ne" and "tu", ignoring the first syllable "a". Based on such oral transcription, the French name "Netou" came to exist along with several historical variants: Nelto, Nettou, Anetthou, Annetton, Anelthou, Nethom or Aréthon, all used by various cartographers. Even though the summit and slopes are entirely within Spanish territory, the first extensive studies of the Pyrenees - and the only ones for the following 100 years - were French ones from the 19th century - starting with the very detailed study by Jean Daniel François Schrader (1844–1924) in 1874. So these names were the toponyms that were then used. It took Émile Belloc's renowned work on the Pyrenees (notably on its hydrology, glaciology and etymology) to establish the name of Aneto as the official toponym; by 1898, he referred to it only by this name.

== History ==
Some 2 km away on its north-west fringe lies the Maladeta peak that, though not being among the five highest peaks in the environment, gave its name to the entire massif. It subsequently earned the greatest interest from climbers, especially in the early 18th century. Mainly, it was a matter of perspective, since from the natural entrance to the valley or arriving from France, its top is in the foreground, while the crest hides the true extent of its eastern neighbour, taller and with larger glaciers. Only when Friedrich von Parrot reached the top of the Maladeta in 1817, came the realisation that both Aneto as well as its neighbours the Pico del Medio, the Punta de Astorg, the Pico Maldito and la Aguja Schmidt Endell towered higher. Until then, the Monte Perdido had been considered the highest. However, the uncovering of the highest point of the Pyrenees had hardly been accomplished when the mountain began to earn a reputation, as several glacial disasters, some fatal, dissipated the interest in crowning it - notably with the death of Luchon Barrau, considered the dean and leading expert in the area. He fell into a crack in the ice on Maladeta. This caused shock among the natives, who, already fearful of venturing on the glacier, became genuinely scared of the mountain they considered cursed.

== Geography ==
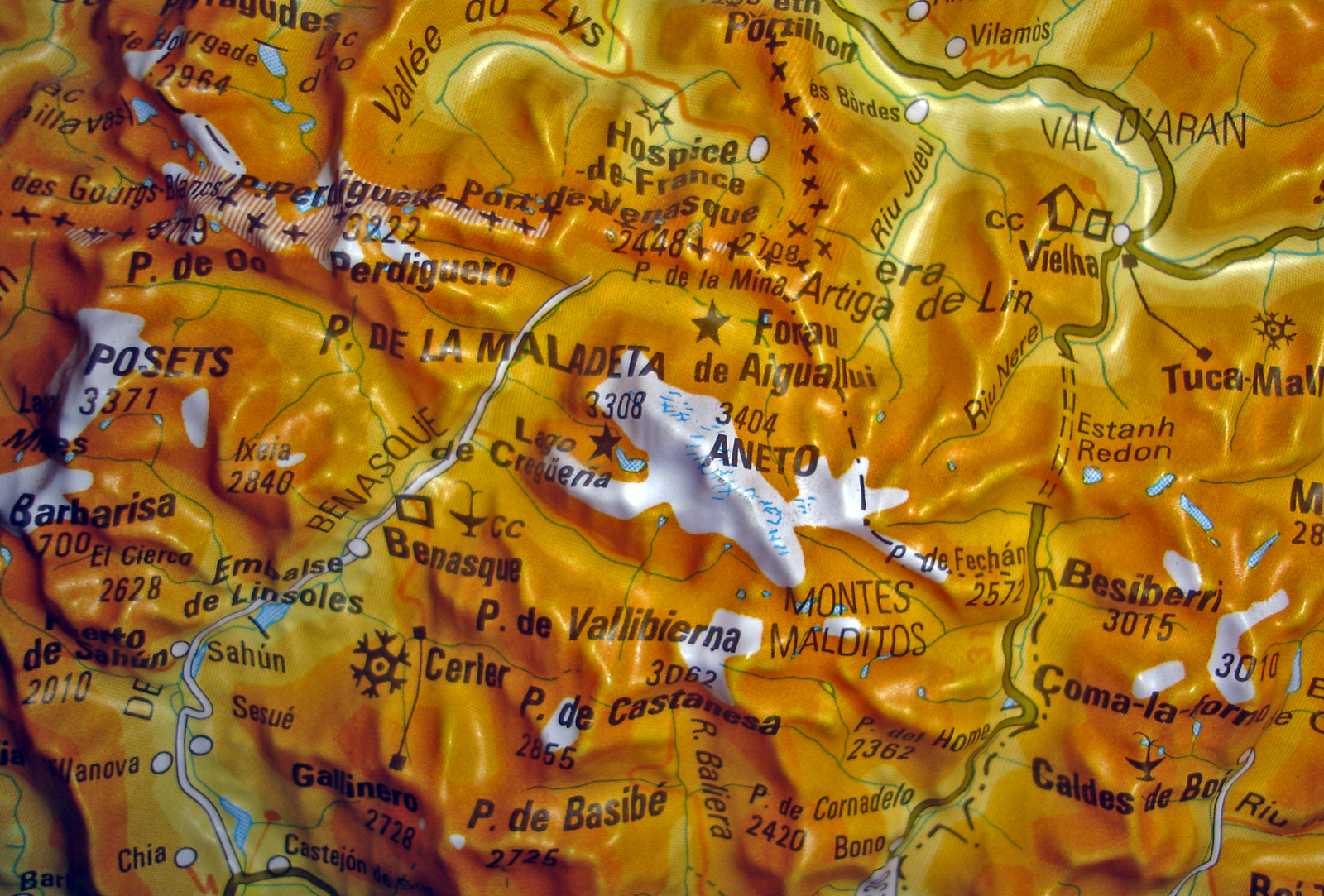
Map of Aneto and the valleys and massifs that surround it.

Aneto rises to 3,404 m (11,168 ft) above sea level in the centre of the Pyrenees mountain range. It lies entirely in Spain, just south of the main ridge of the Pyrenees and the border between France and Spain. The peak lies in the north-east of the province of Huesca above the town of Benasque.

Aneto occupies the eastern end of the Malditos Massif which primarily consists of a 6 km long ridge, running from north-west to south east at over 3000 m. The ridge connects Aneto towards the east with the more visible Maladeta peak, further to the west, and includes the Coronas peaks and Pico Maldito, which, together with the crest of the portillons, gives the massif its characteristic image.

Although the valley to the north is the source of the Ésera river, which flows west and then south, the northern slopes of Aneto and its glacier drain into a sinkhole called Forau de Aigualluts in the Plan de Aigualluts and flows underground to the east where it resurfaces to empty into the Aran Valley and the Garonne river, flowing north into France and the Atlantic Ocean. The waters on the western and southern sides, flow into the Coronas and Llosas lakes respectively before draining separately into the river Ballibierna, which flows into the Esera, then the Cinca before joining the Ebro and flowing to the Mediterranean. Thus although Aneto does not lie on the main ridge of the Pyrenees, it does lie on the watershed between the Atlantic and the Mediterranean.

== Glaciers ==
This agglomeration of summits, all markedly Alpine, is the birthplace of what were once the largest glaciers in the Pyrenees, which stretched up to the mouth of the Congosto Ventamillo with depths of ice several hundred metres thick. Today, global warming has reduced the mass to eleven glaciers. No one knows for sure when the melting process began but despite a slight advance in the 1950s it has now accelerated rapidly, and it is expected that the Aneto permafrost and the glaciers of the Pyrenees could disappear around the middle of the 21st century. The Aneto-Maladeta massif sustains a total of 116 hectares surface, representing more than half of all the glaciers in Spain - all of which being located in the Pyrenees.

There are three glaciers on the slopes of the mountain: the oldest, Aneto glacier on the north side; the Barrancos, alongside the Las Tempestades on the north-east side; and the Maladetas glacier on the north side (under the Maladeta peak).

The rest cannot truly be defined as glaciers without contention, as they have lost all mobility and do not behave as such. Among these are the Cregüella, Alba and Salenques glaciers, which are in a major state of decline. However, even considering them as snowfields, their past glacier state has kept them to date and they are expected to maintain their icy heart for decades.

== Climbing ==
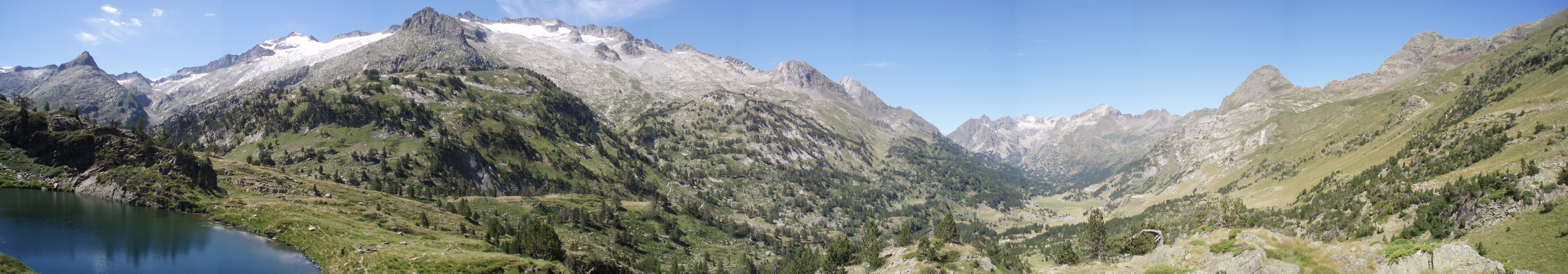
Panoramic view of the Maladeta massif. The Aneto summit is in the left side of the image.

The mountain's ascent is usually made from the Renclusa Refuge (2,140 m). From there, the itinerary traverses the longest part of the glacier that extends to the north of the peak. The summit is defended by a short rocky passage called the Bridge of Mohammed. It is a narrow ridge of large, stable blocks, with an exposed drop on either side. At the summit is an impressive cross and a contrasting view, with the snow-covered Maladeta massif north-west and the Alto Aragon region to the south.

The usual ascent is a very easy although long (12-hour) alpine route. It is taken by many people each year, including many with little or no experience of alpine climbing or high level walking. The high number of people who come to climb Aneto each year makes a significant contribution to the local economy. The vast majority of the people staying at the Renclusa Refuge are there solely to climb Aneto. By comparison many of the adjacent peaks, which are arguably finer climbs, see relatively few ascents and are comparatively quiet.

=== First ascent ===
On 18 July 1842, Platon de Tchihatcheff (Чихачёв, Chikhachev), a former Russian officer vacationing in Luchon, left from Bagnères-de-Luchon accompanied by guides Pierre Sanio de Luz, Luchonnais Bernard Arrazau and Pierre Redonnet. Also in the party were Albert de Franqueville, a Norman botanist, and his guide, Jean Sors. They took the trail from the Hospice de France, crossed the Benasque Pass, then spent the night at the La Renclusa shelter, a simple construction of dry rocks that is now a large mountain refuge.

The next day, they crossed a pass towards Alba pass and lost their way on the south slope around Lake Gregueña. Late in the day, at the end of their strength, they took refuge for the night in a cabin near the Vallibierna valley.

As the sun rose the next morning, the group left for the Coroné pass. Despite a fear of crevasses, they decided to approach the summit by the glacier. After climbing a ridge only a few metres wide (named the "Bridge of Muhammad" by Albert de Franqueville as it is believed, according to a Muslim legend that says that the entrance to Paradise is as narrow as the blade of a scimitar on which only the righteous pass), they reached the summit on 20 July 1842, where they constructed a cairn and left a bottle containing each climber's name. Tchihatcheff wanted to open a more direct route back across the glacier, but his companions flatly refused, forcing him to yield. Four days later he performed a second ascent with another group, pursuing the same objective that his first companions had denied him. On crossing the Portillon, in view of the cracks that furrowed the glacier, a mutiny almost started, but finally, after everyone tied themselves to a big rope, they crossed the chasms and the passage of Muhammad was defeated a second time.

Thereafter Aneto entered into the dynamics of dissemination and popularity of the Pyrenees peaks. In France, its ascension became a great classic and every spring tourist to Bagneres de Luchon had to try it. Henry Spont wrote a book reflecting on this experience, simply titled Le Néthou, describing the trip, the schedule and recommended equipment.

=== First winter ascent ===
The first winter ascent of the mountain was achieved on 1 March 1878 by Roger de Monts, B. Courrèges, and B. and V. Paget.

=== First sea to summit ascent ===
Starting from the Atlantic ocean, unresupplied and unsupported, Louis-Philippe Loncke reached the summit on day 25 of his crossing of the Pyrenees (19 August 2020).

== Flora ==
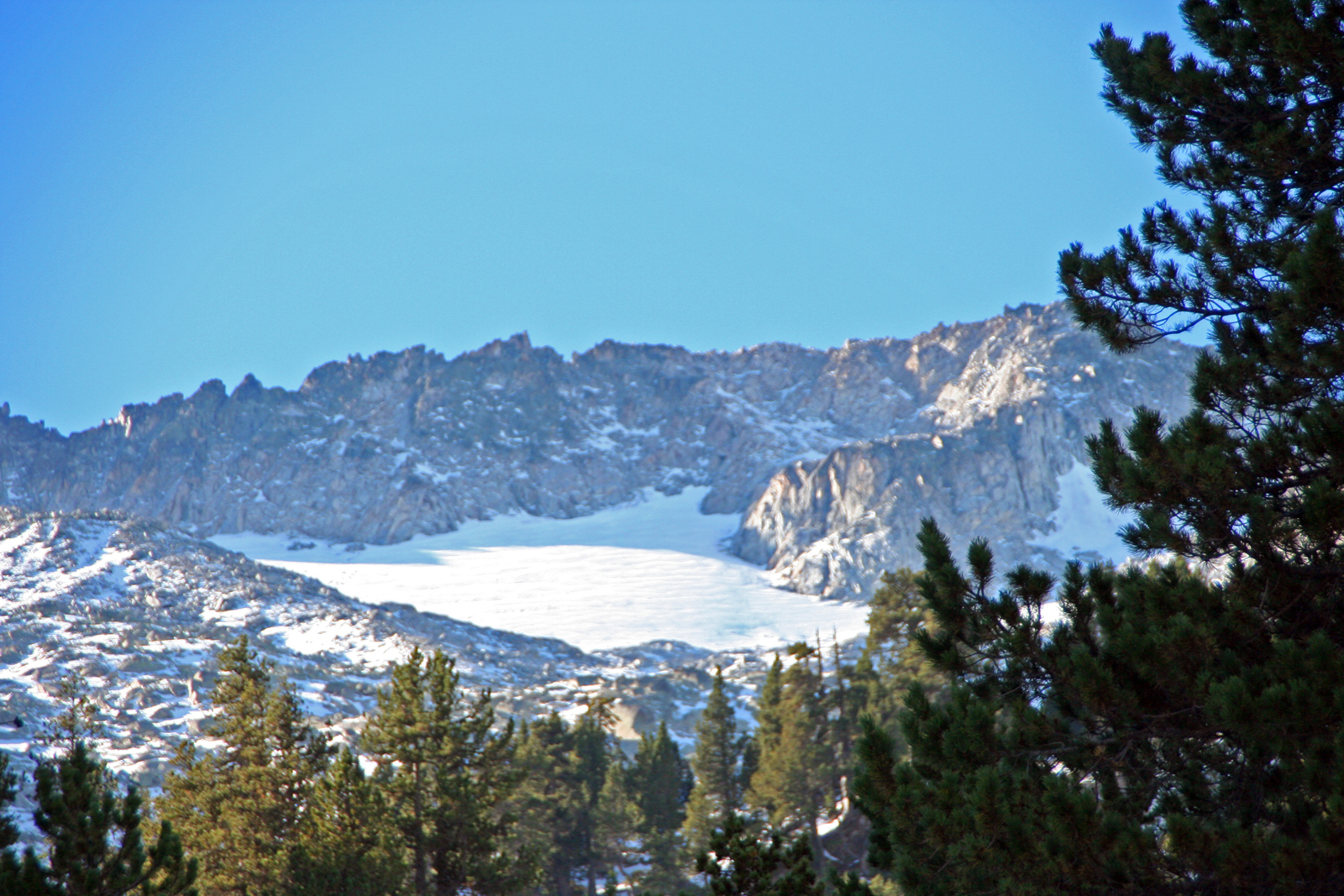
Pine forest at the foot of the massif of Maladeta.

The uniqueness of the massif and its appeal has led to the virtual abandonment of farming activities, replaced by tourism. The flora of the environment, therefore, has been impeccably conserved, especially on hillsides and massifs, where the forests remain in their primary state.

=== Upper Alpine ===
This layer, which reaches 3,404 metres above sea level, is the one that presents greatest difficulties for the development of life. The harsh weather conditions that the plants have to endure at the top of the peaks, ridges and crests, require the development of an extraordinary resilience. There are a number of factors to endure such as strong insolation, low temperatures and short growing seasons in the presence of snow most of the year.

Totally devoid of woody vegetation, it is colonised by more than 100 plant species, including lichens, mosses, succulents and microscopic algae. Among the flora present are Androsace alpina, which is found at 2,800 metres, and Silene acaulis. 20% of these species are endemic to the Pyrenees.

== Air traffic boundary ==
An aviation intersection called ANETO exists very close to the mountain itself, exactly on the border of France and Spain. For pilots crossing the Pyrenees this intersection marks the boundary between the Bordeaux and Barcelona airspaces.

== See also ==
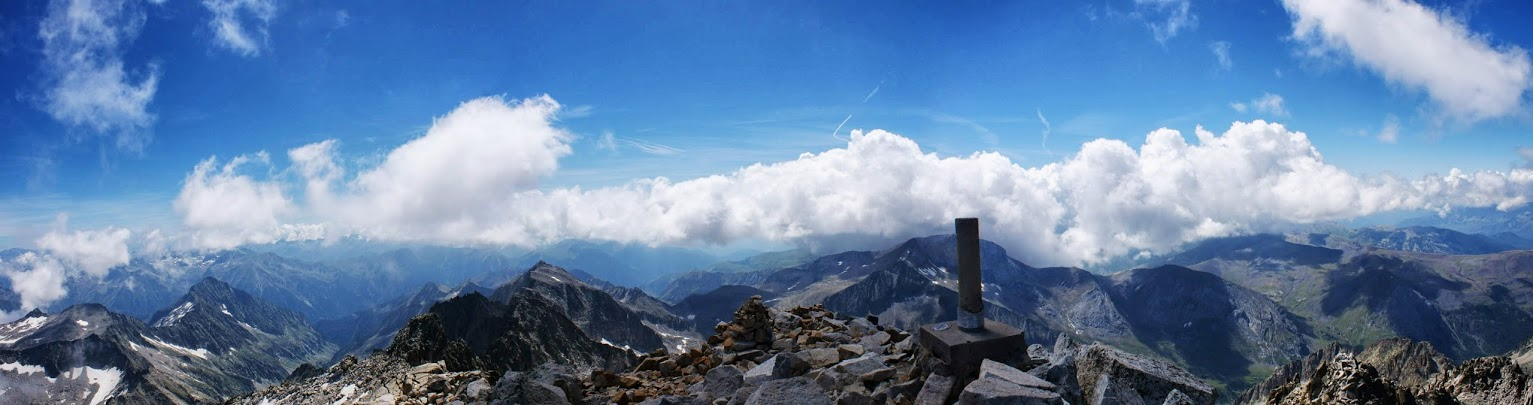
Aneto Peak (3404m) summit panorama, looking South West, Pyrenees range

- List of Pyrenean three-thousanders
