= Macizo de la Maladeta =

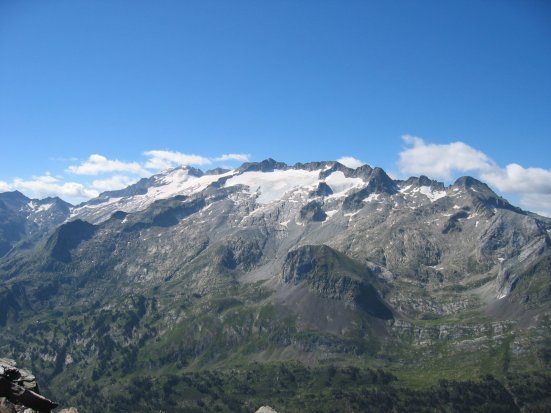

Highest point
- Peak: Aneto
- Elevation: 3,404 m (11,168 ft)
- Listing: List of mountains in Aragon
- Coordinates: 42°38′12″N 0°38′23″E

Geography
- Location within Spain
- Location: Benasque, Province of Huesca (Aragon)
- Parent range: Pyrenées

Geology
- Rock type: Granite

Macizo de la Maladeta is the highest mountain range and the first glacial massif in the Pyrenees. It is located in the Spanish province of Huesca (Aragon). To the north is the head of the Benasque Valley, and to the south the Vallibierna Valley descends.

== Toponomy ==
The name Maladeta was known at the start of the 18th century and the legend of the curse was already very strong.

The latest studies (published in 1989 and 2009) indicate an Aragonese word, uncertainly related to the Latin maledicta ("cursed") but the association of the preindo-European (and precelte) root Mal ("high rocky mountain") at the root dicta (advanced by P. Fouché and A. Dauzat) remains doubtful.

== See also ==
- Mountains of Aragon

== Sources ==
- Carte générale des Monts Pyrénées dite Carte de Roussel 1716-1719 indiquant « Montagne de Maladete »; Jean Escudier, L'Aneto et les hommes, MonHélios, 2012, page 6
