= Petit Encantat =

Highest point
- Elevation: 2,734 m (8,970 ft)

Geography
- Location: Catalonia, Spain
- Parent range: Pyrenees

El Petit Encantat is a mountain peak of Catalonia, Spain. Located in the Pyrenees, it is the lower of the two peaks (the other being the Gran Encantat) of the Els Encantats mountain, with an altitude of 2,734 metres above sea level.

== See also ==
- Mountains of Catalonia
