= Posets–Maladeta Natural Park =

Protected area in Spain

Coordinates: 42.6525°N 0.506389°E

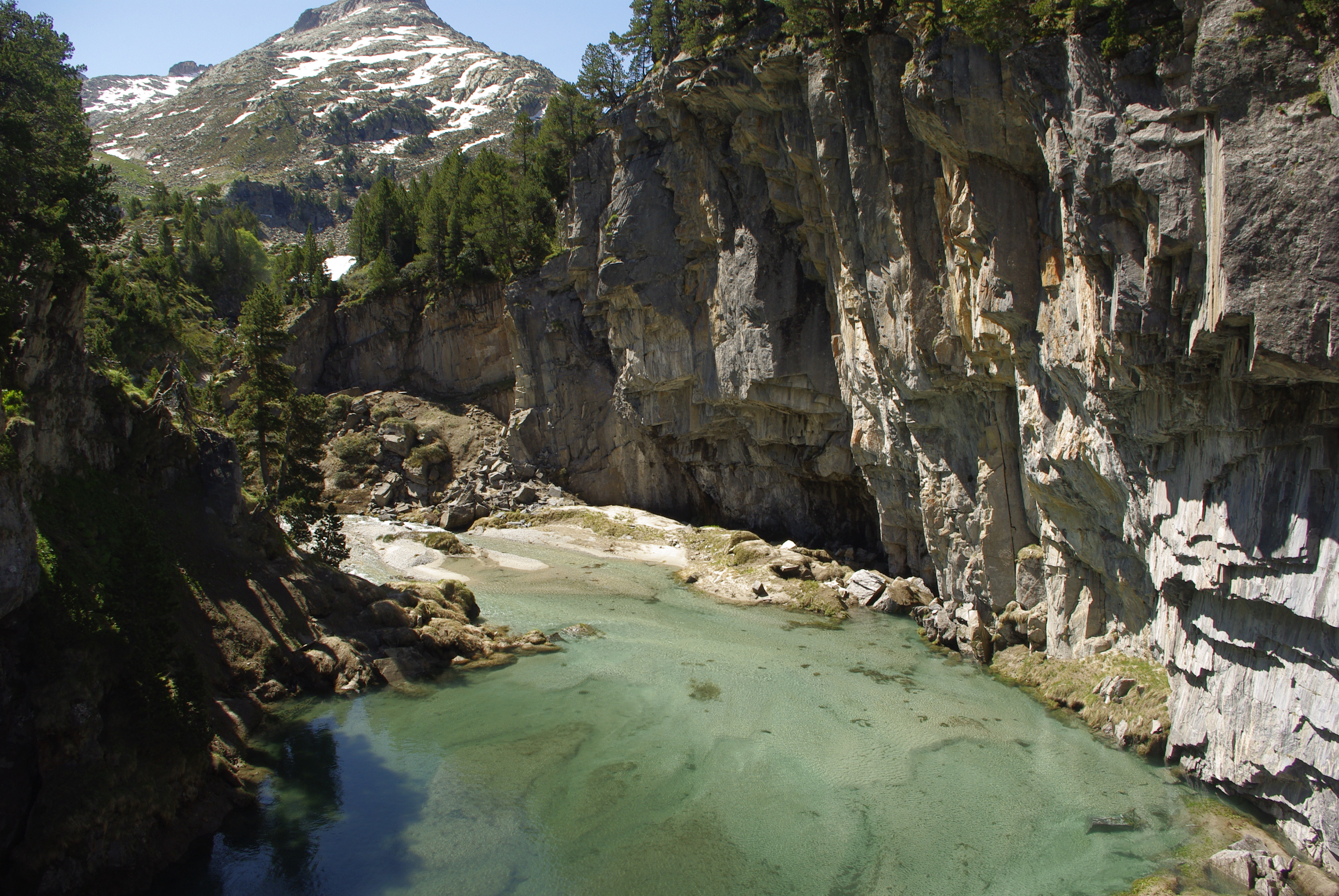
Natural Park of Posets–Maladeta

The Natural Park of Posets–Maladeta is a Natural park located in northern Province of Huesca, Aragón, northeastern Spain. It is set within the Pyrenees .

== Geography ==
The Natural Park of Posets–Maladeta is at elevations from 1,500 metres (4,900 ft) in the valley, to over 3,300 metres (10,800 ft) on the highest mountains.

Mount Aneto, at 3,404 metres (11,168 ft) in elevation, is the highest peak of the Pyrenees Mountain Range System.

Other important peaks in the park include: Posets Peak at 3,371 metres (11,060 ft); and Mount Maladeta at 3,312 metres (10,866 ft).

== Gallery ==
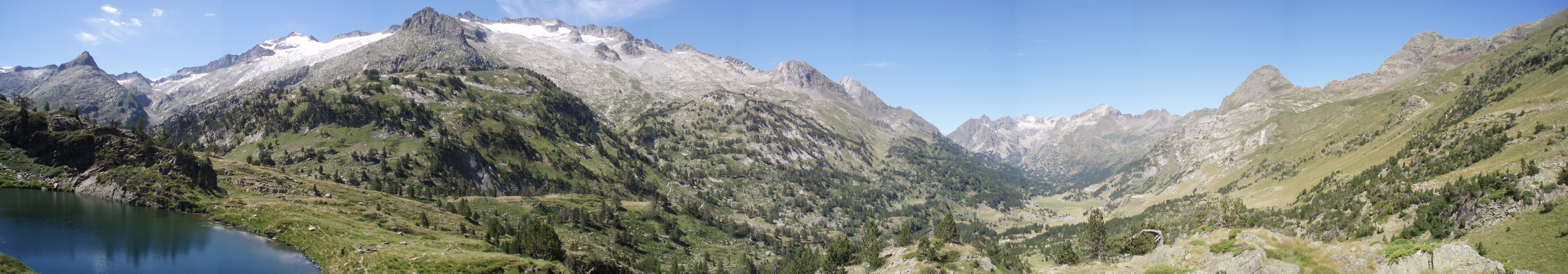
Maladeta peak and Benasque Valley panoramic

.

== See also ==
- Natural park (Spain)
- Index: Natural parks of Spain
- Protected areas of Aragón
