= Pico Posets =

Mountain in the Pyrenees

- Punta de Llardana
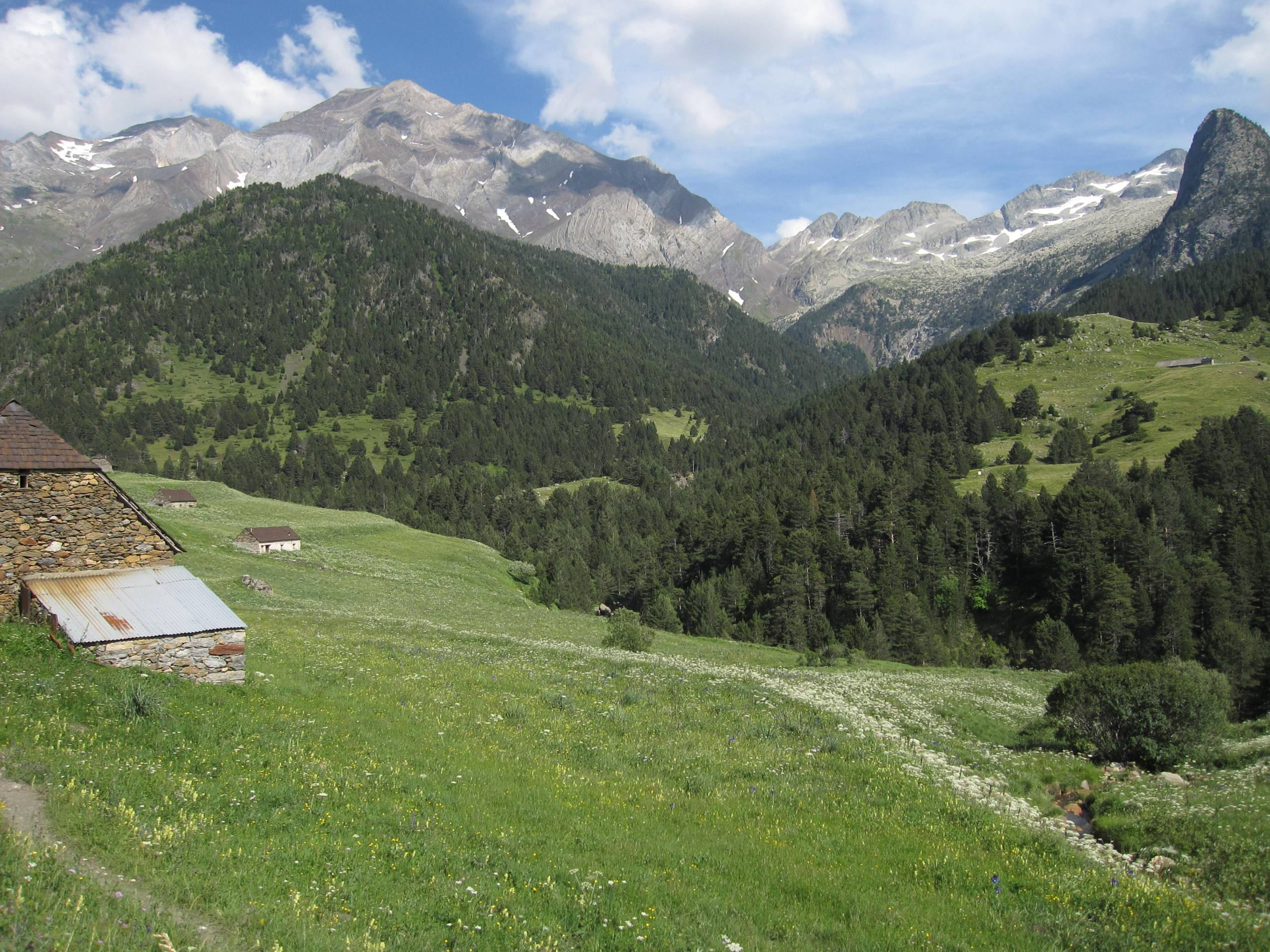
- Pico Posets from the west

Highest point
- Elevation: 3,369 m (11,053 ft)
- Prominence: 1,125 m (3,691 ft)
- Isolation: 18.22 km (11.32 mi) to Aneto
- Listing: Ribu
- Coordinates: 42°39′56″N 0°25′28″E

Geography
- Location within Pyrenees
- Location: Eriste, Benasque valley (Ribagorza, Aragon, Spain)
- Parent range: Pyrenees

Climbing
- First ascent: August 6, 1856 (H. Halkett)
- Easiest route: basic snow/ice climb from Angel Orús refuge

Pico Posets or Punta de Llardana is the second highest peak of the Pyrenees, after Aneto. It is located in the Spanish province of Huesca and is 3,369 metres (11,053 ft) high.

== Ascent route ==
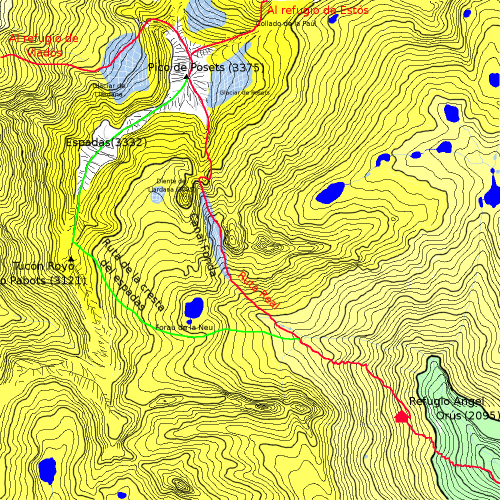
Topographic map of the ascent route

From the Angel Orús refuge (2,095 m), a well-marked path heads northwest. After an hour of climbing the route crosses a stream. Further on, the path forks. The route follows the right-hand fork along a narrow valley (Canal Fonda), which has a snowy section almost all year round, so it is advisable to take an ice axe and crampons.

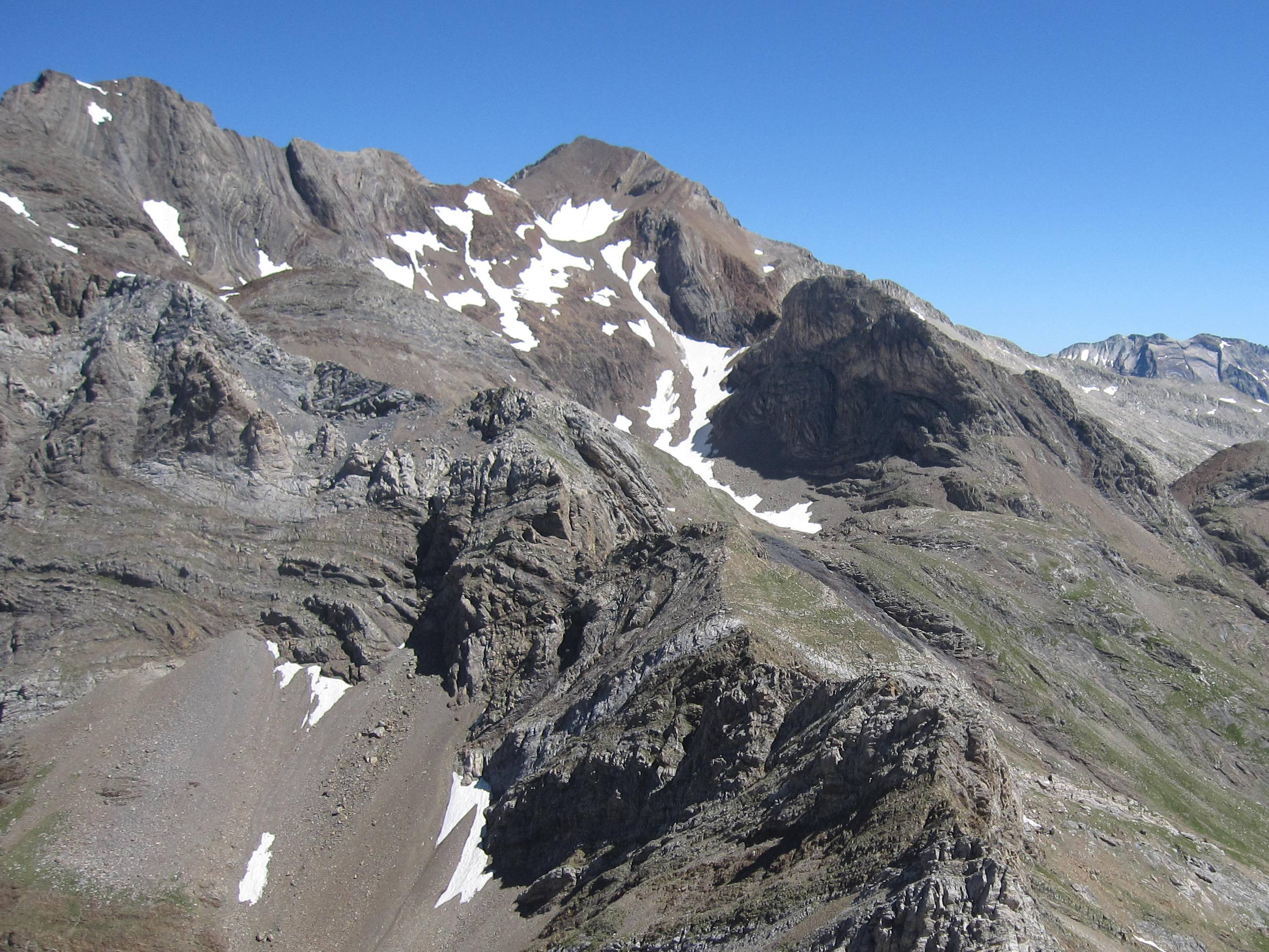
View of Pico Posets from Pico Forqueta

In under three hours, the path leads to the foot of the Tooth of Llardana (which can be ascended more easily when returning from the summit of the Posets). Following the stone slope after four hours of ascent the summit is reached.

The descent to the refuge follows the same route and takes about three hours.

== See also ==
- Espadas Peak
