= Ésera =

Tributary of the Cinca River

Coordinates: 42°12′50″N 0°20′53″E

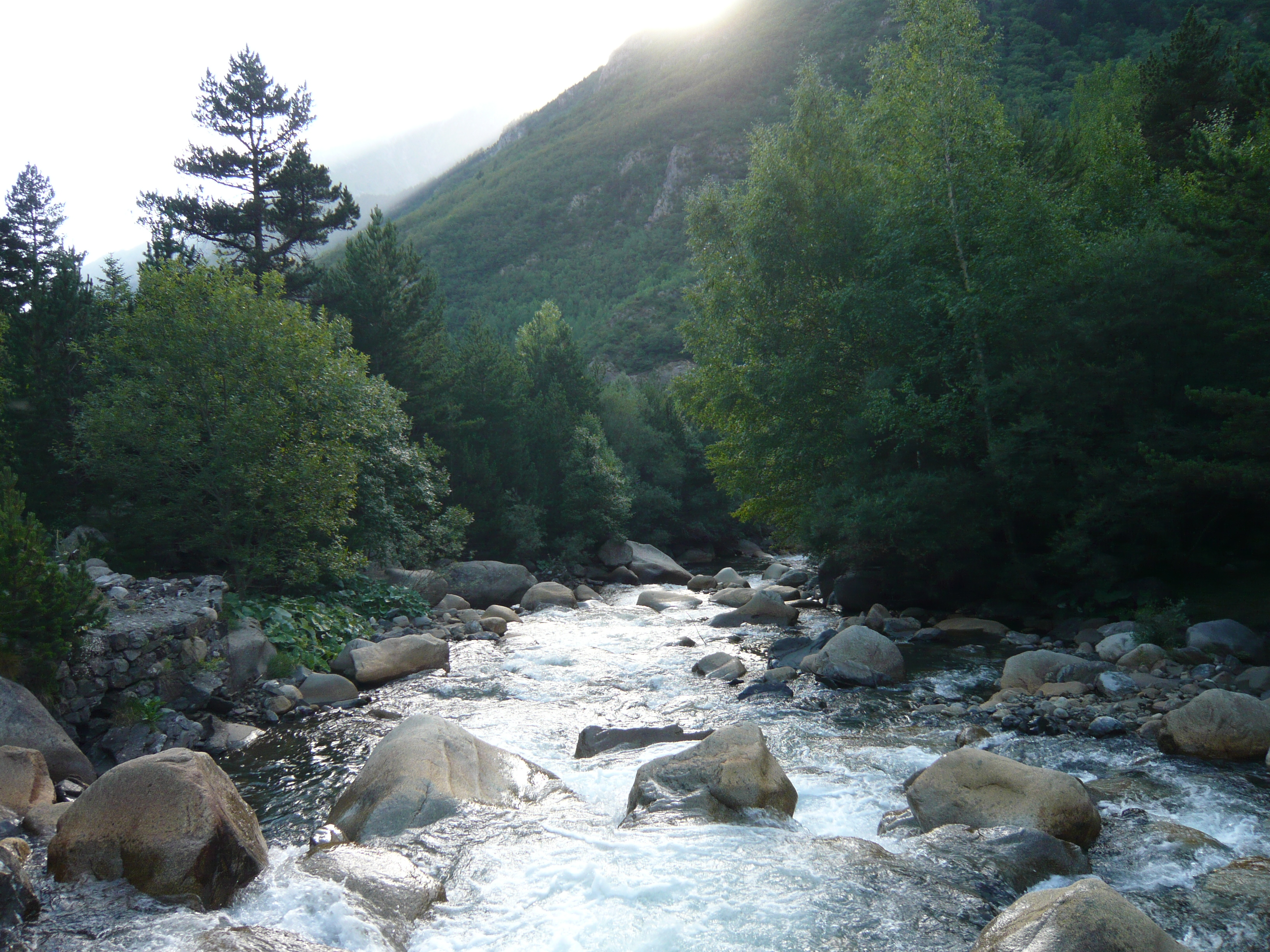
The river as seen from a foot bridge

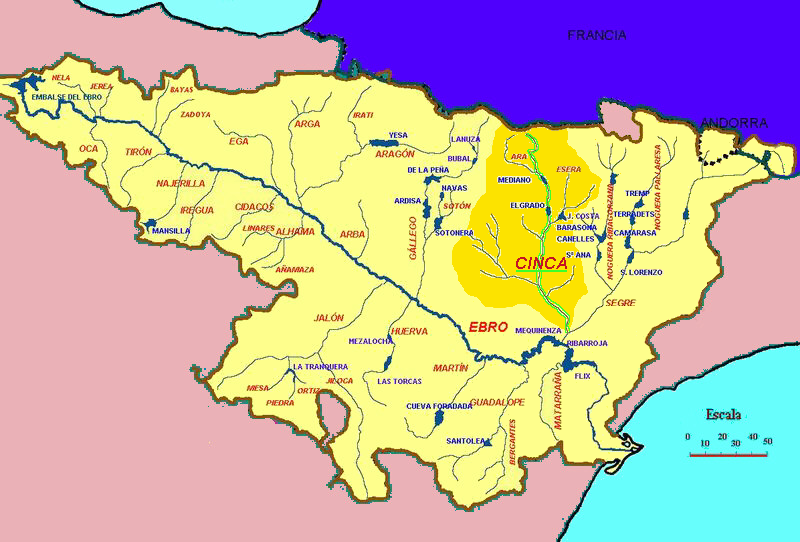
The Ésera and the Cinca in the basin of Ebro

The Ésera (Spanish: [ˈeseɾa]) is a tributary of the Cinca in the High Aragon. It is part of the valley of the Ebro and its drainage basin. Its etymology is Celtic and it is cognate with several European rivers: Isar, Jizera, Isère, Isel, IJssel, and Eisack.
