= Benasque =

Town in the comarca of Ribagorza, province of Huesca, Spain

Coordinates: 42°36′N 0°32′E

- Municipality
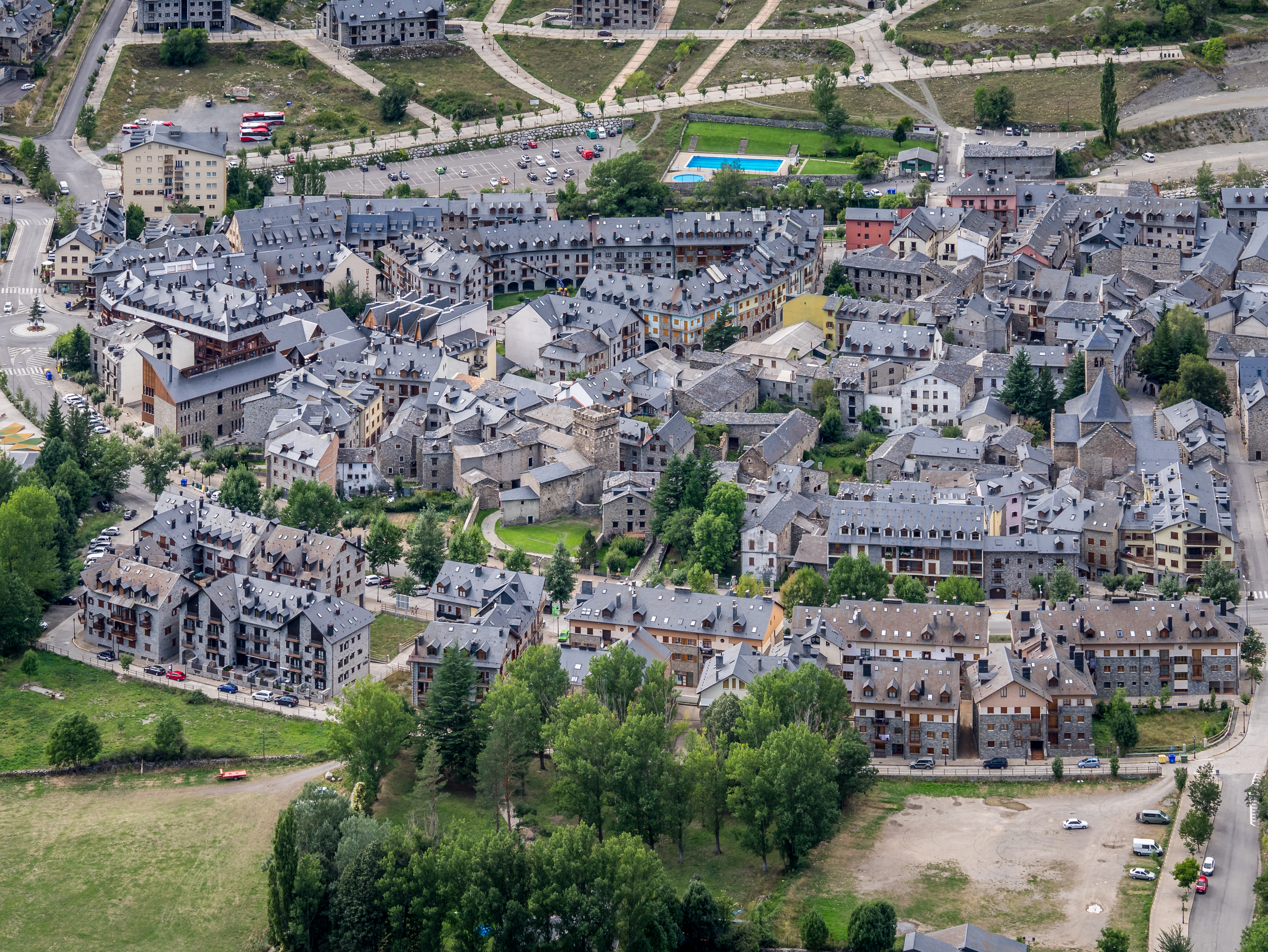
- View of the village from the east (2017)

- Flag Coat of arms

- Location within Aragon Location within Spain
- Country: Spain
- Autonomous community: Aragon
- Province: Huesca

Population (2025-01-01)
  - Total: 2,359
- Time zone: UTC+1 (CET)
  - Summer (DST): UTC+2 (CEST)

Benasque (Spanish: [beˈnaske]; in Benasquese dialect: Benás; Aragonese: Benás) (locally [beˈnas]) is a town in the comarca of Ribagorza, province of Huesca, Spain. It is the main town in the Benasque Valley, located in the heart of the Pyrenees and surrounded by the highest peaks in that range.

== Climate ==
The climate is of a high mountain type, with cool summers, and cold winters and frequent snow. Its average annual temperature is 9.4 degrees Celsius (at 1138 meters above sea level).

== Language ==
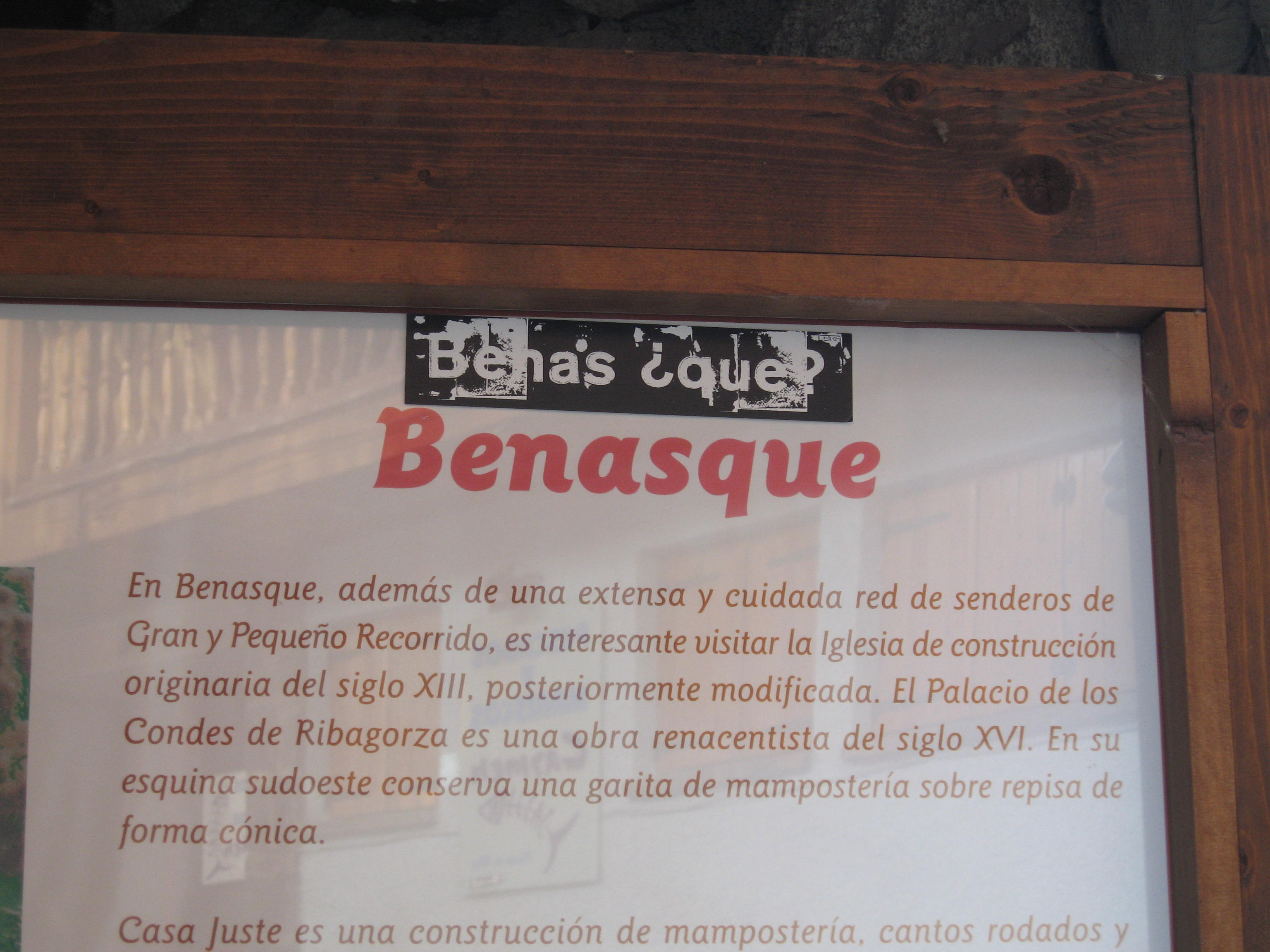
A sticker in Benasque, saying "Benas ¿que?", meaning "Benas what?". "Benasque" is the Spanish name of the town, while the name in the local dialect is "Benás".

The regional language of Benasque is a Catalan–Aragonese transitional dialect that shares features with Gascon (Occitan). It is usually called patués ("patois") by its native speakers. Possessing features that are transitional between Aragonese and Catalan, it has sometimes been classified as a variety of Catalan.

To promote the local language, the local council has held an annual writing and poetry competition in patués since 1999. Separate awards are given to young and adult authors.

== Gallery ==
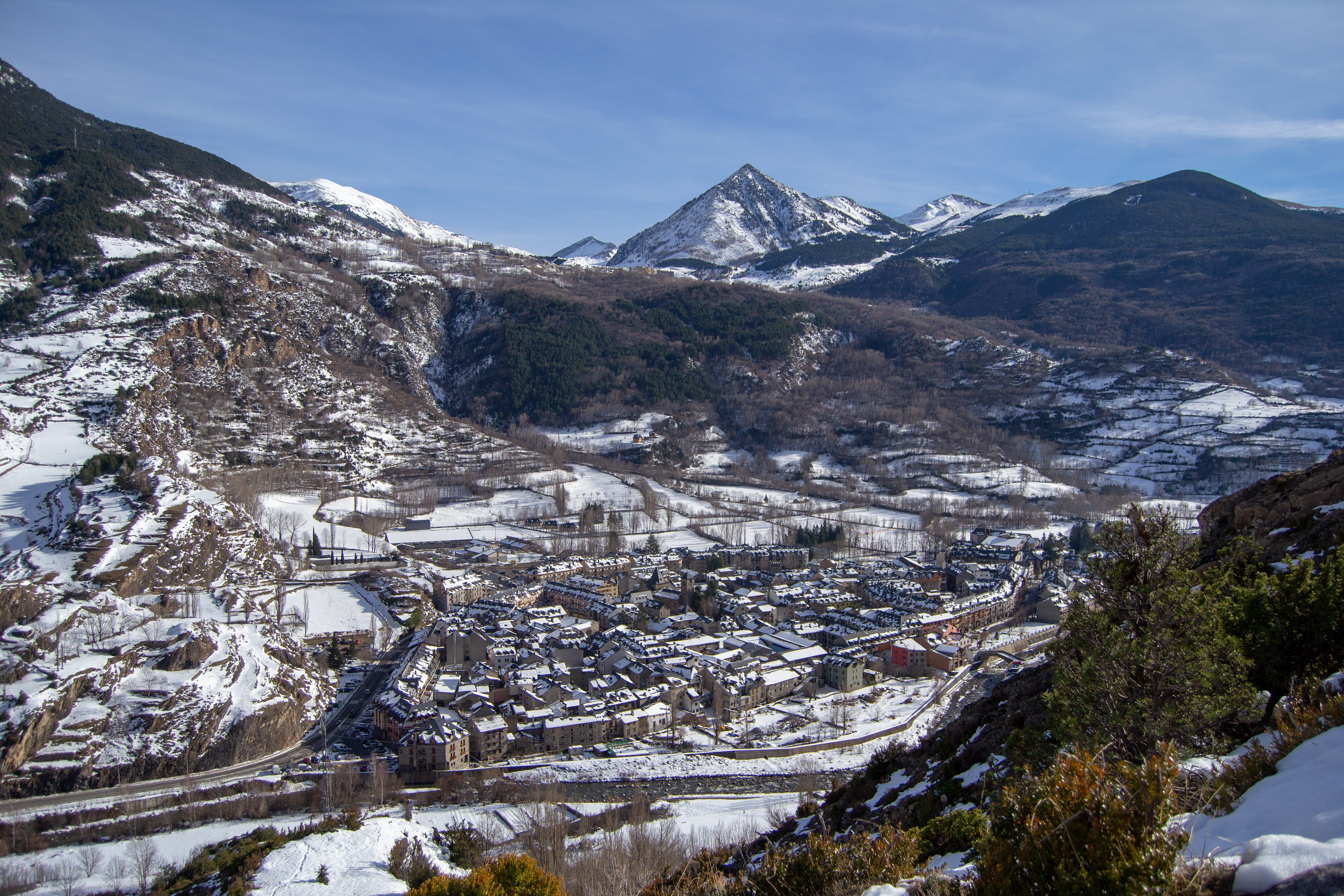
Benasque seen from the northwest (winter 2019)

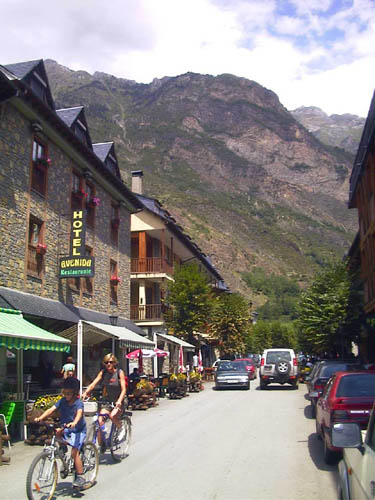
Benasque: Avenida del los Tilos

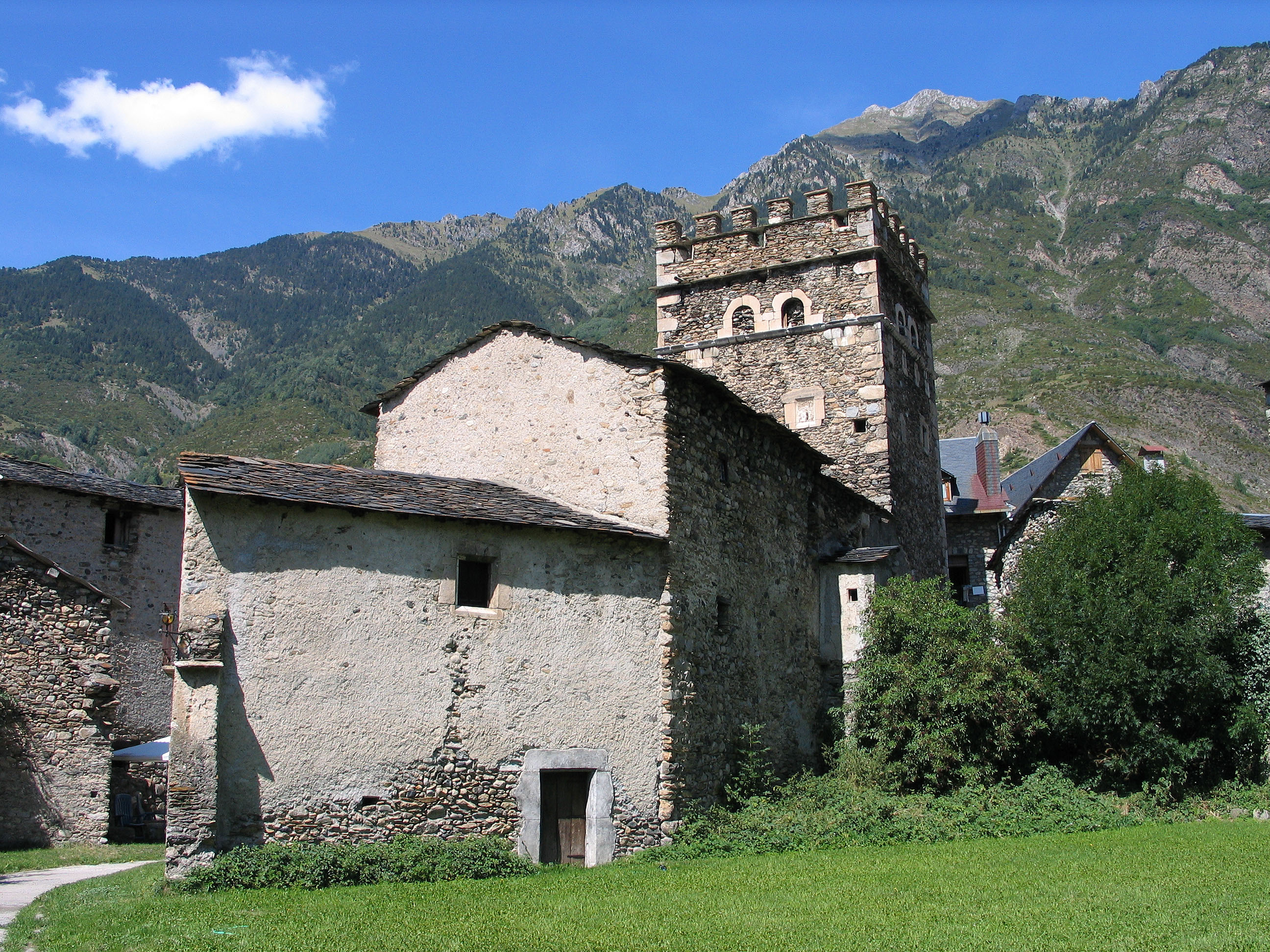
Torre de los Infanzones (Casa Juste)

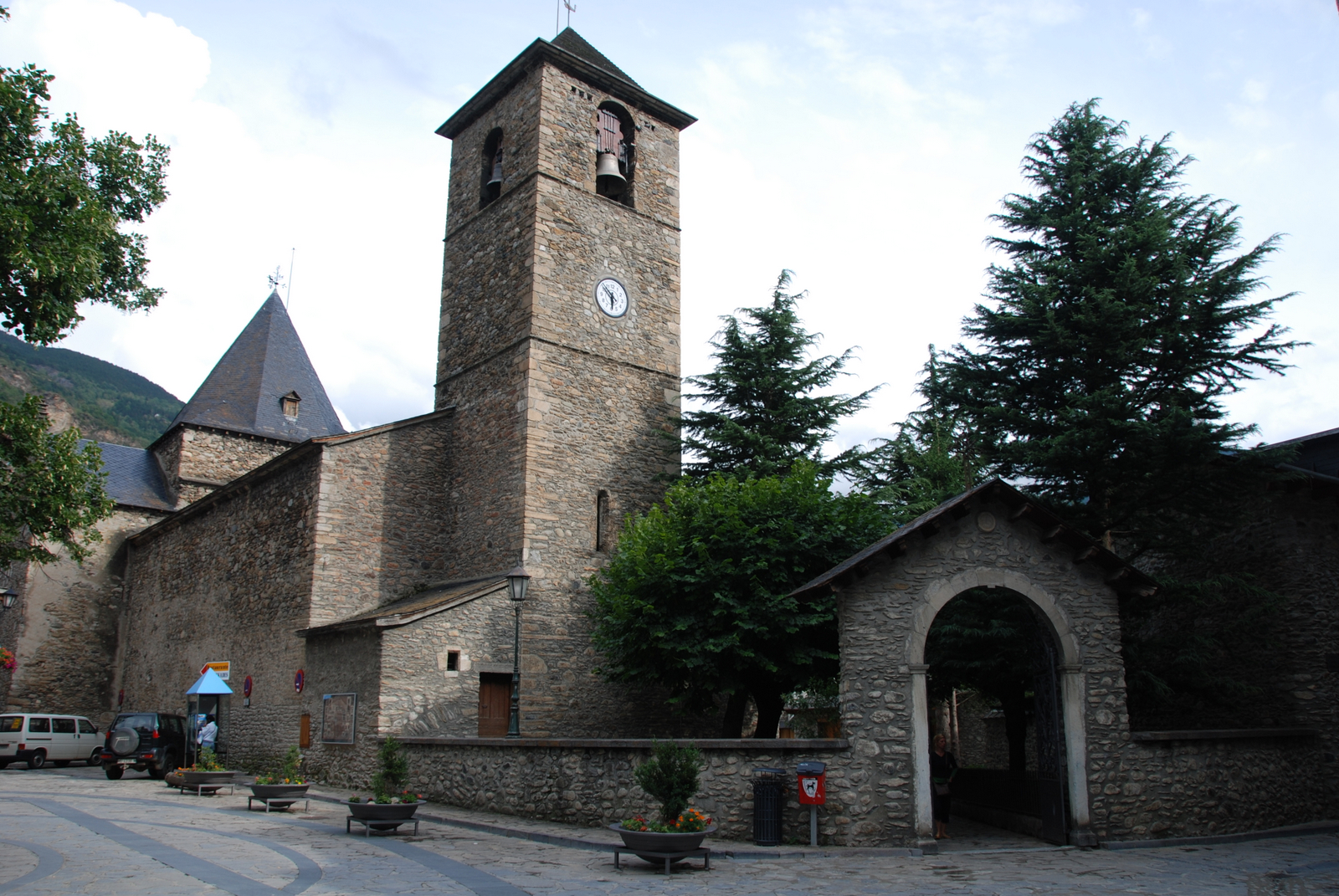
The church Santa María (la Mayor)

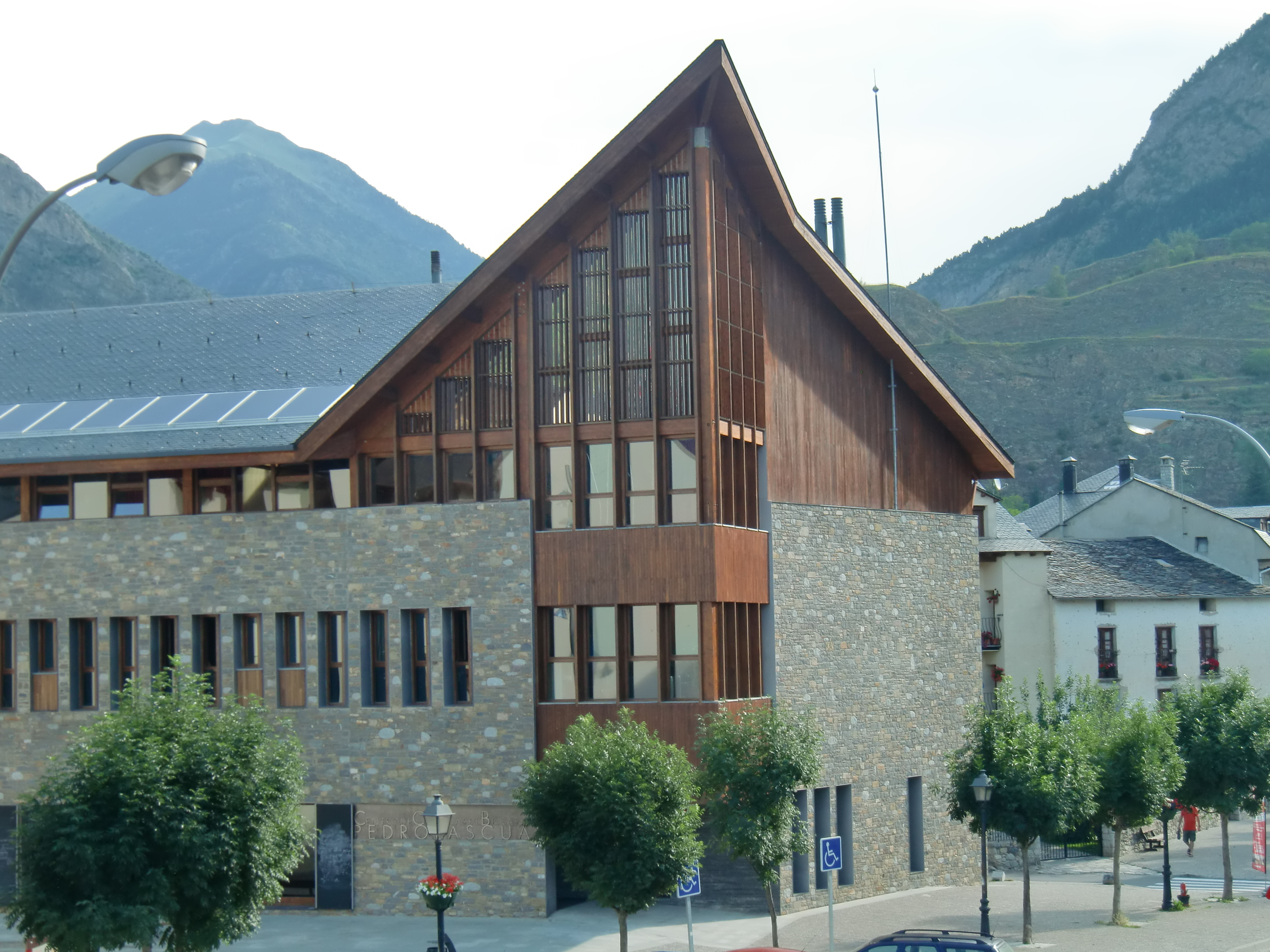
Centro de Ciencias de Benasque Pedro Pascual

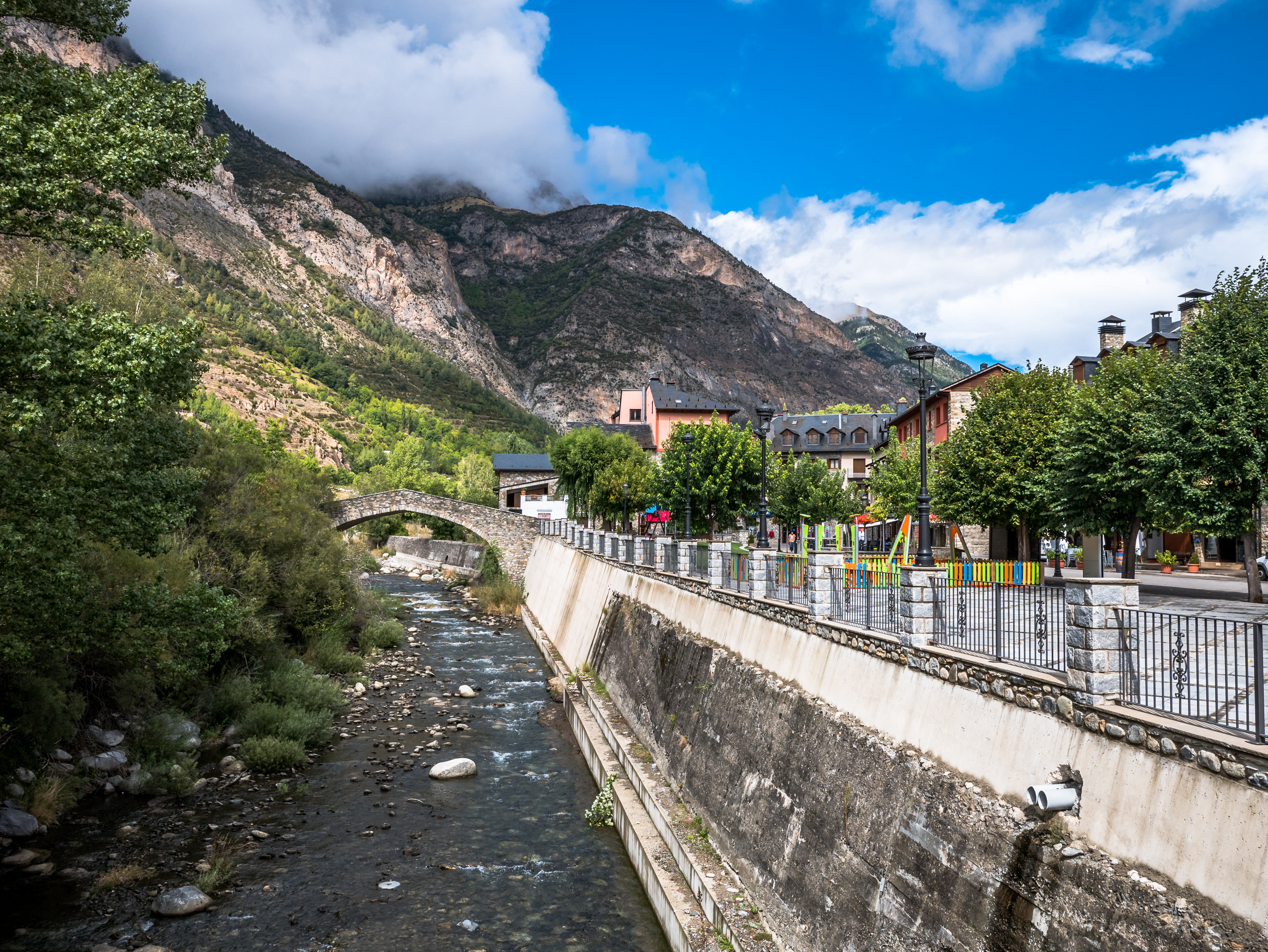
Ésera in Benasque

== See also ==
- Benasque and Ballabriga rolls
