= Eugenio Lascorz =

Byzantine pretender (1886–1962)

Eugenio Láscaris
- Undated photograph of Eugenio Láscaris from the archive of his family
- Born: Eugenio Lascorz y Labastida; 26 March 1886; Zaragoza, Spain
- Died: 1 June 1962 (aged 76); Madrid, Spain
- Occupations: Lawyer, attorney and pretender
- Years active: c. 1906–1962
- Spouse: Nicasia Justa Micoláu Traver
- Children: 6, including Teodoro Láscaris

Eugenio Lascorz y Labastida (26 March 1886 – 1 June 1962) was a Spanish lawyer who claimed to be a descendant of the medieval Laskaris family, which had ruled the Byzantine Empire in Nicaea from 1204 to 1261. In 1917 he legally changed his paternal surname from Lascorz to Láscaris, alleging that the former was a Hispanicization of the latter. Later he began styling himself as Príncipe Eugenio Láscaris Comneno (Prince Eugene Laskaris Komnenos). As the supposed titular Emperor of Constantinople, Eugenio used the regnal name Eugene II Lascaris Comnenus. (Note: There was no Byzantine emperor named Eugene. Lascorz's regnal number "II" derives either from one of his invented ancestors – a supposed "Eugenios Lascaris" said to have lived in the 16th century – or from the 4th-century Western Roman Emperor Eugenius.) In addition to his royal and imperial claims, which he supported with fabricated and contradictory genealogies, Lascorz also claimed the titles "Prince Porphyrogenitus", Duke of Athens and Grand Master of the self-proclaimed "Sovereign and Imperial Order of Constantine the Great" (not to be confused with the Constantinian Order of Saint George) and the "Order of Saint Eugene of Trebizond".

In the 1920s, Lascorz established himself as a successful attorney in private practice in Zaragoza. He combined that legal career with historical and literary studies focused on Ancient and Byzantine Greece, publishing works of both fiction and non-fiction that explored what he regarded as the history of his ancestors. In 1923 he proclaimed himself to the Greek people as the legitimate heir to the throne of the historical Byzantine Empire and as claimant to the crown of the modern Kingdom of Greece.

After the outbreak of the Spanish Civil War in 1936, Lascorz served as a military judge in the Nationalist forces led by General Francisco Franco. Between 1939 and 1943, he served the new Francoist state as a judge under the terms of the Law of Political Responsibilities. In 1943, Lascorz resigned his judgeship and moved to Madrid, where he dedicated himself full time to his dynastic claims and to the government of his orders of chivalry. The exposure of his Byzantine genealogy as fraudulent caused a minor scandal within the high society of Madrid in 1953 and 1954, but Lascorz persisted in his claims until his death in 1962. His son Teodoro (1921–2006) and grandson Eugenio (born 1975) have continued those claims as "Theodore IX" and "Eugene III", respectively.

== Biography ==
=== Ancestry and early life ===
Eugenio Lascorz y Labastida was born in Zaragoza on 26 March 1886 and as per Spanish naming customs, took the surnames of both of his parents, Manuel Lascorz y Serveto (born in 1849) and Carmen Labastida y Pascual (born in 1857). He was baptised two days after his birth in the Basilica of Our Lady of the Pillar. His paternal grandparents were the labourer Victorián Lascorz and his wife Raimunda Serveto; his maternal grandparents were Manuel Labastida and Ramona Pascual. His great-grandfather (Victorián's father) was a man named Alonso Lascorz y Cerdán. The surname Lascorz is not uncommon in High Aragon, and there is a village of that name in the province of Huesca. (Note: The village of Lascorz is located in the municipality of Foradada del Toscar, in the county of Ribagorza. In the 2022 census it was listed as having only five inhabitants, but during the Middle Ages it was the site of an important castle. According to Aragonese historian Alberto Panillo, when Sancho III of Pamplona took for himself the County of Ribagorza in the early 11th century, he decreed that the heirs of the former Count, William Isarn, would bear the title of Lords of Lascorz, from which they took that surname.) The name is probably of Basque origins. The Lascorz family emigrated from the village of Plan to Zaragoza in the third quarter of nineteenth century, part of the large influx of immigrants from rural Aragon to its capital at around that time.

The Lascorz family enjoyed significant wealth and social status in Zaragoza. Eugenio's father, Manuel, was a lawyer as well as a doctor of philosophy and letters, who served as secretary of the local provincial council. Manuel and Carmen had three children, Eugenio being the youngest. He had an older brother, Lorenzo (1877–1900), and a sister, Josefina (1881–1956). Both Eugenio and Lorenzo studied at the University of Zaragoza. Lorenzo studied medicine while Eugenio studied law. At the university, Eugenio became fascinated by Byzantine history. Lorenzo died in 1900 at the age of 22, making Eugenio the "heir" to Manuel. Eugenio began his professional career as an attorney in 1917. Exactly when Lascorz began his Byzantine claims is unclear. Later family tradition is that his father "revealed" their family history on his deathbed on 5 August 1906, declaring to Eugenio and Josefina that he was not just Manuel Lascorz y Serveto, but Prince Alexios Manuel Lascáris-Comneno, who had arrived with his father Prince Andronikos in Spain after fleeing from Ottoman persecution. Manuel's obituaries stated that he was a "descendant and heir of the ancient Greek imperial family of the same surname, fleeing from the ruins of his homeland".

Eugenio was a brilliant student, and he received his doctorate in law from the University of Zaragoza in 1911. In 1917 he was admitted as Procurador de Tribunales ("Procurator of the Courts"), which in the Spanish system is a legal professional who specializes in court procedures and who is licensed to represent clients before the courts. From 1933 to 1937 he would serve as Dean of the College of Procurators of Zaragoza.

=== Byzantine claims and aspirations ===
==== Attempt at gaining the throne of Greece ====
Lascorz, possibly inspired by his father, believed that his last name was a corruption of Laskaris, the name of a medieval Greek dynasty that had ruled the Byzantine Empire in Nicaea from 1204 to 1261. Lascorz was a proponent of the Greek Megali Idea: the Greek aspirations of conquering former Byzantine territory, including Constantinople. He embarked on a campaign to secure recognition of his royal descent by substituting "Lascorz" for "Láscaris" before the Spanish courts. Lascorz believed that his descent from the Laskarids gave him a claim to the throne of the Kingdom of Greece, an idea to which he dedicated the rest of his life. Eugenio had his paternal surname legally "corrected" from Lascorz to Láscaris, and later began to style himself "Eugenio Láscaris Comneno". At the time, Greece was embroiled in a political crisis, following the abdication of King Constantine I, which put the future in Greece of the ruling House of Glücksburg in doubt.

In 1923, Lascorz issued a manifesto to the Greek people, proclaiming himself "Prince Eugene Lascaris Comnenus, heir to the Emperors of Byzantium and Pretender to the Throne of Greece". In 1924, King George II was forced to abdicate and the Second Hellenic Republic was proclaimed. Lascorz saw in these events the fall of the House of Glücksburg and an opportunity to claim the Greek throne for himself. According to Lascorz, he had received the blessing of the Patriarch of Constantinople, Meletius IV, in 1922. In 1927 Lascorz and his oldest son Teodoro were supposedly granted some honours by the Greek Orthodox Patriarch of Jerusalem, Damian I. The Láscaris family archives contain documents that they claim show that former Greek prime minister Eleftherios Venizelos, while in self-exile in Paris in the early 1920s, seriously considered Lascorz as a candidate for the Greek throne. According to contemporary newspapers and radio broadcasts in Spain, several Greek deputies expressed interest in offering the Greek crown to Lascorz. That nothing came of this after Venizelos became prime minister again in 1928 is explained away by Lascorz's modern descendants as due to the economic crisis and political instability plaguing the country.

==== Genealogical forgeries ====
In 1920, Lascorz married a woman named Nicasia Justa Micoláu Traver, with whom he would go on to have six children. Each received names of ancient Byzantine royalty, such as Teodoro, Constantino, Alejandro and Juan Arcadio. The maternal surname was altered first to Micolav and then to Micolaw, apparently to give the impression that it was Slavic. In fact, Nicasia's father and grandfather had been confectioners in small towns of Lower Aragon, in the province of Teruel. In 1935, Lascorz also invented an elaborate genealogy for himself, (Note: There is no evidence for most of the genealogy Lascorz created. In the early sections, where the genealogy overlaps with real Byzantine history and families, many portions are demonstrably false. The Láscaris-Comneno genealogy names the father of Emperor Theodore I Laskaris as Manuel (or Emmanouil), but the name of their father is not known from historical sources and was probably Nicholas, since Theodore gave that name to his firstborn son (per Byzantine naming customs the firstborn son was commonly named after one's father). According to the genealogy, the family descends from one of Theodore's brothers, Manuel, who was a real historical figure, but the genealogy designates him as sharing a mother with Theodore and Constantine. The real Manuel was likely only their half-brother, just having the same father. The genealogy gives Manuel a son, Constantine, who is called "Prince of Epirus", and a grandson, "Manuel II" (supposedly the rightful heir to the empire after the death of John IV Laskaris), who is titled as "Count of Cefalonia". At this time, Epirus was under the rule of the Komnenos Doukas family, a branch of the Angelos dynasty, not the Laskaris dynasty. Manuel II's son, "Thomas I", is stated to have married "Anna Palaeologa, sister of Emperor Andronikos". Emperor Andronikos II Palaiologos did have a sister of that name, who did marry an Epirote noble, but that noble was not a "Thomas Laskaris", but Demetrios Doukas Komnenos Koutroules, son of the despot Michael II Komnenos Doukas.) which notably altered his own familial history. His grandfather Victoriano was substituted by "Prince Andronikos Theodore Laskaris", supposedly described by his father on his deathbed. Eugenio's paternal great-grandfather, Alonso, was substituted by a "Prince Theodore Laskaris, Porphyrogenitus".

As a lawyer, Lascorz was principally concerned with practical tasks and he did not make intellectual contributions to legal studies. During the Spanish Civil War (1936 – 1939), Lascorz served as honorary captain of the Aragonese Requeté, an armed group that fought alongside General Francisco Franco's Nationalist faction and which was directly tied to the traditionalist and legitimist movement known as "Carlism". Lascorz served as a military judge under the Nationalist faction, and after the Nationalist victory of 1939 he was appointed as judge in San Sebastián under the terms of Franco's draconian Law of Political Responsibilities. In 1942 he moved to Barcelona, taking up another position in Franco's system of military justice. A strong supporter of the new regime, Eugenio, his wife, and his son, Teodoro, wrote to Franco several times. Franco's office responded, addressing Eugenio and his family with their self-proclaimed titles.

Known at this stage as the "Prince Eugenio Flavio Láscaris-Comneno", Eugenio resigned his military judgeship in 1943 and moved to Madrid, where he dedicated himself to promoting his dynastic claims and his orders of chivalry. He was also devoted to the study of Ancient and Byzantine Greece, and he wrote several works on Greek history. His publications on Byzantine themes were not restricted to historical works. In 1943, he published Calígrafia griega y bizantina ("Greek and Byzantine Calligraphy"), a collection of calligraphic exercises, beginning with tracing and then moving to reproductions of real ancient Greek and Byzantine initials, manuscripts and signatures. In 1956, Lascorz published "Caliniki: Evocación histórica", a short story centering on a fictional Lacedaemonian girl named Cali Cabasileas who falls in love with Andrónico, a courtier of Despot Manuel Kantakouzenos.

In 1946, Eugenio attempted to expand his "Sovereign and Imperial Order of Constantine the Great" and his own order of Saint Helena into international organisations. In 1948, he began publishing his own magazine, Parthenon, with the Asociación Cultural Greco-Española (the Greco-Spanish Cultural Association, an organization based in Madrid) and on 15 September 1950 he founded the International Philo Byzantine Academy and University (IPHBAU), a "cultural extension" of his self-proclaimed chivalric orders, which also had its own magazine.

Eugenio published new genealogies in 1947 and 1952, changing the names of some of his ancestors, adding more supposed princes, and altering their relationships relative to the original genealogy of 1935. The 1952 version, the first to refer to Eugenio's father as "Alexios Manuel", explicitly contradicts Eugenio's earlier versions, which he had attempted to have validated by the Spanish courts. He did obtain "recognition" from several courts in Italy. Those courts did not investigate his genealogy, nor did they have the competence or authority to validate claims to the throne of the Byzantine Empire or the Kingdom of Greece.

=== The Hidalguía controversy ===
Lascorz's dynastic claims attracted some attention and support, especially in Spain. However, in 1953 and 1954, Lascorz and his family became the focus of what historian Carlos Sancho Domingo has called the "Hidalguía controversy". This episode had its origins in the campaign launched in 1952 by the Holy See to root out what it considered fraudulent orders of chivalry. That campaign had been publicised by the Spanish press by 1953, at a time when negotiations between the Vatican and the Spanish government were about to culminate in the Concordat of 1953. Lascorz was head of the "Sovereign and Imperial Order of Constantine the Great", which the official Vatican newspaper, L'Osservatore Romano, listed among the false orders. Lascorz also granted many noble titles to his family members, friends, and supporters. (Note: For instance, Norberto de Castro y Tosi, author of the 1959 biography of Lascorz, had been named "Marquess of Barzala" in 1952.) Those activities had attracted the attention of the Spanish government and the official Spanish aristocracy. On 23 April 1953, an article in the ABC newspaper, "False chivalric orders and false titles of nobility", identified Lascorz as a forger and his orders and institutions as fake, stating that Lascorz violated "not only the principles of Church law, but also the sovereignty of the Spanish state". In later issues the newspaper also published and rebuked Lascorz's responses to the article, pointing out that the Spanish government had not approved his orders.

At the start of 1954, José María de Palacio y de Palacio, the 3rd Marquess of Villareal de Álava, published a long and carefully documented article in Hidalguía (a learned journal of genealogy, nobility, and heraldry), showing that Lascorz's dynastic claims were fraudulent and even internally contradictory. (Note: Translated into English, the title of this piece was "The False Orders of Chivalry. Reflections upon a Porphyrogenitus and Emperor of Byzantium of... narrow gauge, Grand Master of the Sovereign and Imperial Order of Constantine the Great and of the Royal Slavic Crown of the Wends (The Curious Case of Doctor Lascorz)". The phrase "narrow gauge" (in Spanish, vía estrecha) in the title alludes to the narrow-gauge railways that served towns on the Spanish Pyrenees, including the region of High Aragon in which Palacio argued that the Lascorz family actually originated. The "Sovereign Order of the Royal Slavic Crown of the Wends" was another self-styled order of chivalry that had been united with the Láscaris orders from 1946 until 1952, when their respective founders fell out with each other.) In his article, Palacio included a facsimile of Eugenio's "grand title of nomination", which ran over four printed pages and included such appellations as Caesar, Augustus, Basileus, Despot, Paraspondylos, and Megaskyr, as well as many dukedoms and princedoms.

Palacio alleged that Lascorz had used his knowledge of the Spanish legal system and the complicity or ignorance of certain officials in order to alter his name and present himself as a descendant of the Laskaris dynasty and, consequently, as a legitimate claimant to the Greek throne. On 13 March that same year, the Láscaris family responded through Teodoro (Eugenio's oldest son and family spokesman because of Eugenio's advanced age), who gave an interview to Informaciones, a daily newspaper in Madrid, in which he denounced Palacio was an "old enemy" of the family and was actively attempting to "persecute" them.

Palacio's detailed and well documented critique of Eugenio Lascorz's dynastic pretensions was particularly damaging to his social prestige and that of his immediate family. The International Institute of Genealogy and Heraldry, whose founder Vicente de Cadenas y Vicent was also the director of the journal Hidalguía, appointed a commission to resolve the controversy. That commission was presided by Miguel Gómez del Campillo, director of the National Historical Archive of Spain. Its final report, issued on 18 June, vindicated Palacio and concluded that the Lascorz family's dynastic claims were deliberate fabrications.

The Hidalguía controversy did not cause Eugenio or his family to abandon their dynastic claims. One of their most notable supporters was Norberto de Castro y Tosi, a Costa Rican genealogist and diplomat who in 1959 published a biography, written in French and first published in Paris, of le Prince Eugène Lascaris Comnène. Castro was very favourable to Lascorz and did not mention episodes that might have caused controversy, such as Lascorz's role as military judge under General Franco or the Hidalguía controversy that had taken place some years earlier. Castro's biography was re-issued in Spanish in 1989, after the deaths of both the author and his subject, under the title Eugenio II, un príncipe de Byzancio ("Eugene II, a Prince of Byzantium"), in an edition prepared by Eugenio's son Juan Arcadio.

=== Final years and death ===
His son and heir Teodoro Láscaris, argued that the campaign against Eugenio carried out by Cadenas, Palacio, and others associated with Hidalguía had a political motivation. Eugenio had been closely associated with Carlism during the Civil War and its aftermath. According to Teodoro, leading figures behind Hidalguía were part of a rival current within the National Movement supporting General Franco, namely Falangists. In that interpretation, the Hidalguía controversy was an opportunity for them to discredit a prominent figure of a competing faction in Francoist Spain. Teodoro also alleged that the campaign against his father was precipitated by the death of Carlist claimant Archduke Karl Pius (known to his supporters as "Carlos VIII") on 24 December 1953. In any case, the consensus of modern historians is that the evidence presented in Hidalguía against Eugenio's genealogical claims was factually accurate.

Despite the negative press, Lascorz continued to push his claims. On 29 October 1955, he issued a proclamation to the people of Cyprus, then a British colony and not yet an independent country, in the hopes that they would liberate themselves and proclaim him as their monarch. In his proclamation, Lascorz stressed his supposed descent from "Prince Andronikos Theodoros Laskaris", "hero of the Greek War of Independence", and he ended the text with "Long live Greece! Long live Cyprus! Long live the Megali Idea, neither dead nor forgotten!". The proclamation attracted little attention in Cyprus.

In 1956 a municipal court in Zaragoza ruled that the previous change of surname from Lascorz to Láscaris had been irregular. This judgment was registered in 1957, whereupon Eugenio legally reverted to the surnames that he had at birth: Lascorz y Labastida. In 1961, the corresponding change was inscribed on the margins of the birth registries of Eugenio's six children in the Spanish Civil Registry. That decision, which probably resulted from the earlier Hidalguía controversy, marked a complete official rejection by the Spanish authorities of Eugenio's genealogical claims, but it did not cause Eugenio or his children to abandon them. Several of Eugenio's children emigrated to Hispanic America, where they continued to promote their family as heirs to the Byzantine throne. As of 2017, Carlos Sancho reported that all of Eugenio's thirteen grandchildren bore the surname Láscaris.

Eugenio is mentioned by the English travel writer Patrick Leigh Fermor in his book Mani: Travels in the Southern Peloponnese, published in 1958. There the author, who was a great enthusiast of Byzantine history, alludes, among other pretenders to the vanished Byzantine throne, to "a Lascaris maniac from Saragossa".

Eugenio Lascorz died in Madrid on 1 June 1962, at the age of 76. His death garnered some media attention, for instance being reported in the 26 July issue of the Colombian newspaper Diario de Boyacá and in the 15 August issue of the French newspaper Lyon-Information (also known as Independance), there under the article title L'Hellénisme en deuil: Son Altesse Impériale et Régent le Prince Flavius Eugène II Láscaris Comnène ("Hellenism in mourning: His Imperial and Royal Highness Prince Flavius Eugene II Lascaris Comnenus").

== Legacy ==
Lascorz' children continued to maintain his claims and his self-proclaimed chivalric orders. His descendants, the Láscaris or Láscaris-Comneno family, survive to this day. Many of his children left Spain, having become exhausted by the controversies in which the family became embroiled. His heir as "titular emperor" was his oldest son, Teodoro Láscaris-Comneno ("Theodore IX", 27 October 1921 – 20 September 2006), who moved across the Atlantic together with Eugenio's other male children, Juan Arcadio and Constantino. Teodoro, Juan Arcadio and Constantino taught at universities in Colombia, Venezuela, and Costa Rica. Teodoro propagated the idea that the Americas represent "New Byzantium" and the "Fourth Rome"; (Note: The First Rome is Rome itself. The Second Rome is Constantinople due to its foundation as the Roman Empire's new capital by Constantine the Great in AD 330. The concept of a Third Rome is a Russian idea, proclaiming Moscow as the successor of Rome and Constantinople due to becoming the new centre of the Eastern Orthodox faith.) where Christian faith, Western thought, and Greek civilization would continue to survive. The younger son Constantino, who died in 1979, enjoyed a noteworthy academic career as a professor of philosophy and journalist in Costa Rica.

Teodoro's son Eugenio (born on 10 October 1975), or Eugene III Theodore Emmanuel Lascaris Comnenus, maintains his family's claims. To this day, supporters of the family maintain Lascorz was legitimate, and that he was a restorer of traditional Byzantine institutions.

== See also ==
- Succession to the Byzantine Empire
