= Roda de Isábena =

Village in Huesca, Spain

Coordinates: 42°17′N 0°32′E

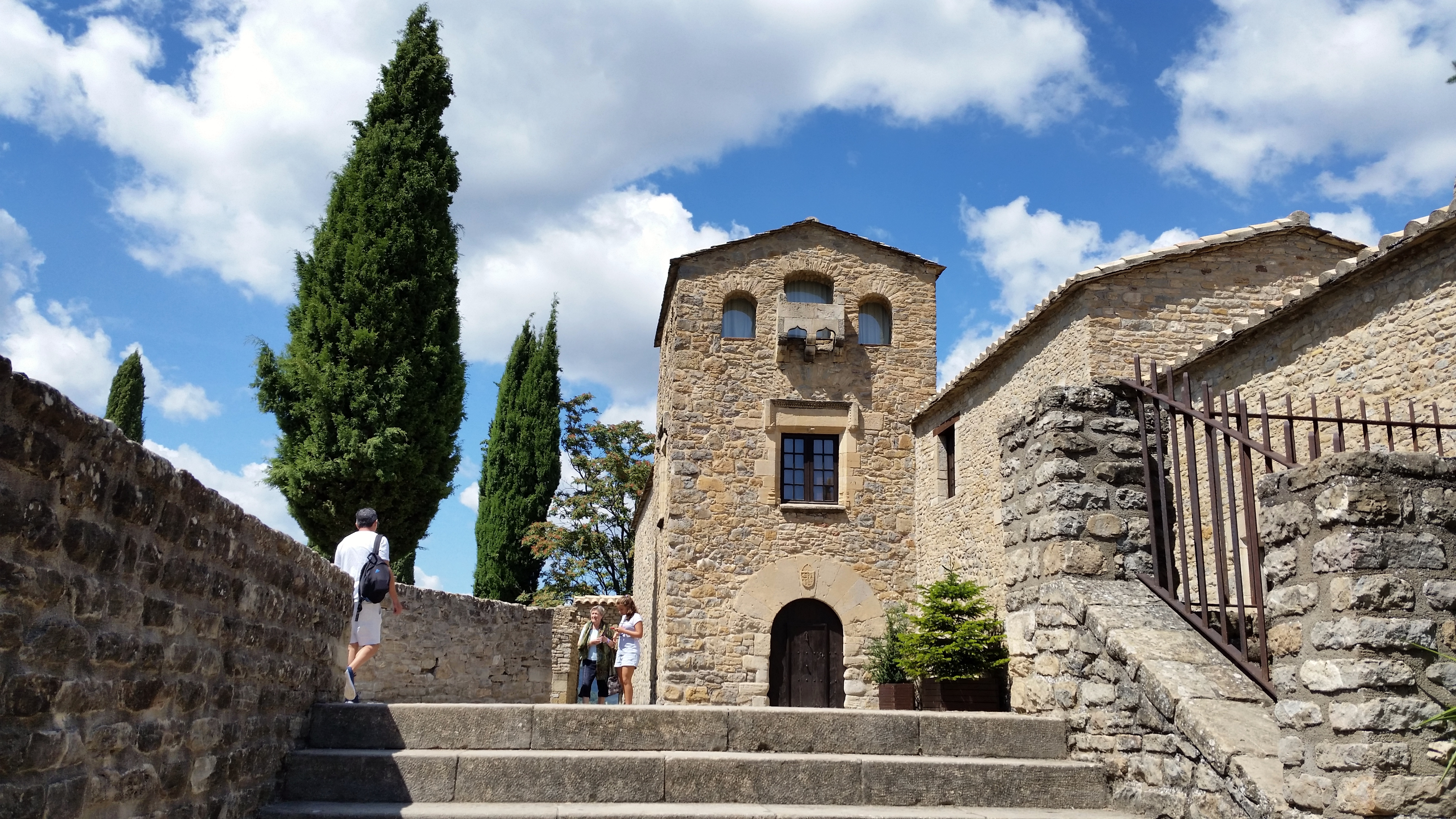
Palace Roda de Isábena

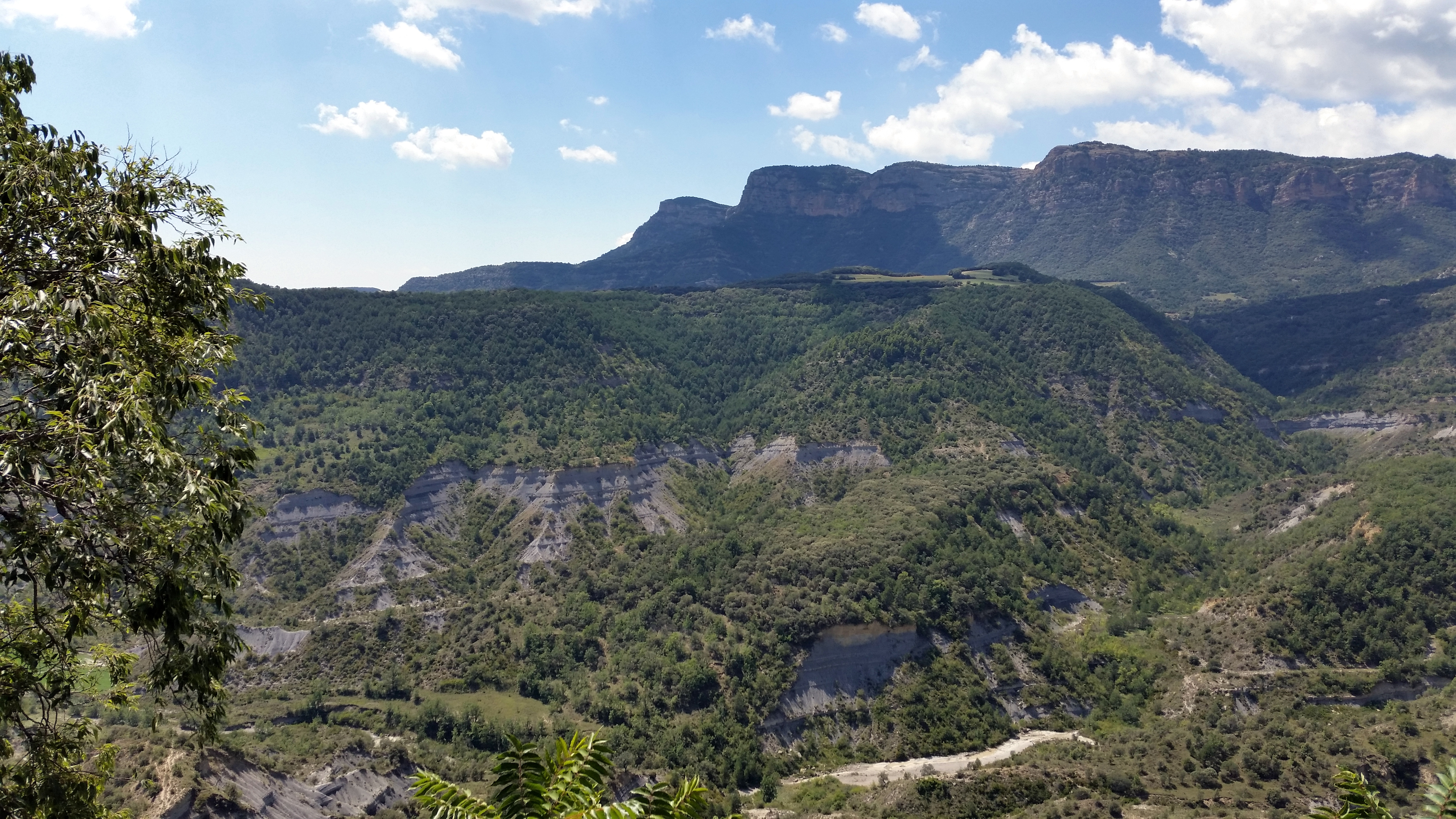
Morrons de Güel from Roda de Isábena

Roda de Isábena is a village in the municipality of Isábena, in the region of Ribagorza, in the province of Huesca, Spain.

It was the capital of the county of Ribagorza and site of a diocese, the reason why the Romanesque Cathedral of Roda was built between the 11th and 12th century. Located near the Isábena river, the county of Ribagorza was one of the founding domains from which was built the Kingdom of Aragon. The village of Roda rises over a mountain which dominates the access to the valley of Isábena. During the 10th century, it was a fortified village which served as a vigilance point between the Muslim Taifa of Zaragoza and the Christian county of Ribagorza, which would ultimately become part of the Kingdom of Aragon.

== Episcopal see ==
About the middle of the tenth century, Roda de Isábena became an episcopal see, with the inauguration of the Cathedral of San Vicente de Roda de Isábena, and the political capital of the county of Ribagorza. The removal of the see, first to Lleida and then to the diocese of Barbastro-Monzón reduced the importance of the locality. The Spanish desamortización (a long historical process in which "unused" territories, generally owned by the Church, were publicly auctioned) and the predation of the 20th-century art thief René Alphonse van den Berghe despoiled it of some of its rich cultural heritage.

== Today ==
Nowadays, Roda has the distinction of being the smallest Spanish village with a (former) cathedral, and has a hotel in a 17th-century palace.
