= Theodore Laskaris =

Theodore Laskaris or Lascaris may refer to:

- Theodore I Komnenos Laskaris, Byzantine Nicene emperor from 1205 to 1221
- Theodore II Doukas Laskaris, Byzantine Nicene emperor from 1254 to 1258
- Teodoro Láscaris-Comneno (1921–2006), Spanish professor and pretender
