= Abbey of Santa María de Alaón =

Abbey in Sopeira, Spain

Coordinates: 42°19′05.34″N 0°44′59″E

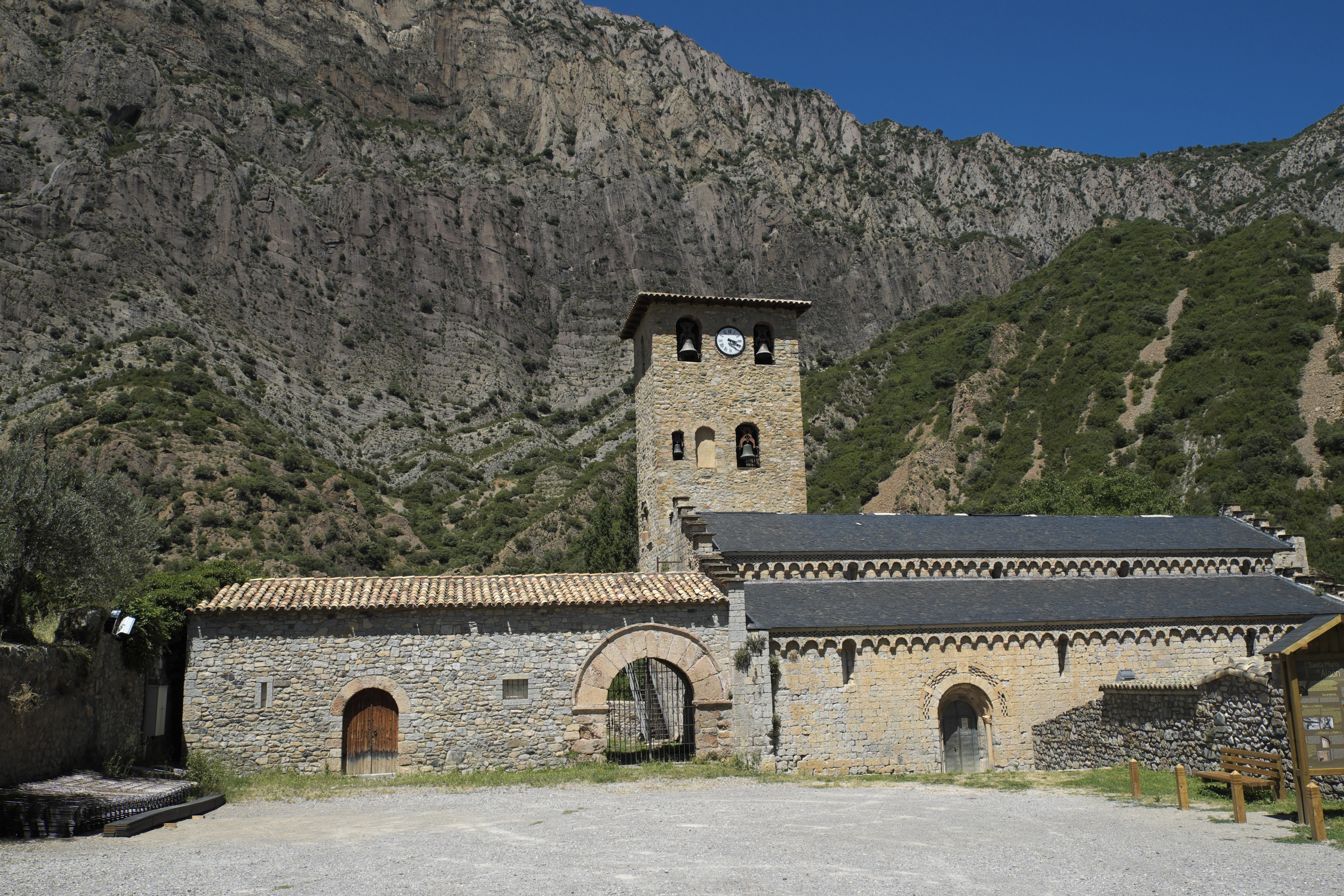

The Royal Abbey of Santa María de Alaón (Spanish: Monasterio de Santa María de Alaón, Catalan: Monestir de Santa Maria d'Alaó) is a former Benedictine abbey, earlier a Cluniac priory, in Sopeira in the Pyrenean county of Ribagorza, Aragon, Spain, established in the late 11th or early 12th century over a 6th or 7th century foundation. The monastery is notable for its Lombard Romanesque architectural style.

Monastic life continued until the Ecclesiastical Confiscations of Mendizábal in 1836, when the monastery was abandoned, and the abbey was relegated to the status of parish church of the town of Sopeira. A hundred years later, during the Spanish Civil War, a fire destroyed part of the monastic buildings and what little content had remained. The church has since been restored, along with such other structures as survived, and continues to serve the community.

The groundplan of the temple is that of a basilica with three aisles and semi-cylindrical apses with blind arcades and a square bell tower of four storeys. The main doorway has voussoirs, a pointed arch and archivolts, and a chrismon above it, depicting the Trinity. The monastery formerly had a cloister, of which now only the bases of a few columns remain.

Beneath the main sanctuary area 2 stairways lead down to a crypt. Recent archaeological examination has determined that the crypt was originally a small Visigothic temple upon which the abbey was subsequently constructed. Modern stucco was partially removed from the vaulted ceiling area leading down to the crypt and 2 sets of inscriptions were found - the first set of writing dedicating the church to Saints Peter and Paul, and a second inscription in red visigothic characters dedicating the small sanctuary to Saints Nereus and Achilleus.

The abbey's cartulary (which includes a short historical text, Fragmentum historicum ex cartulario Alaonis) contains various documents related to its foundation, privileges and ecclesiastical rights amongst which are a record of various genealogies and Medieval events chronicling the years 806 and 814 through 1245. The charter is believed to have been compiled in the second half of the 12th century (transcribed largely from an earlier 10th or 11th-century cartulary), with its latest document dating from 1121, though documents of the thirteenth century were added at some point. It is believed that around the 15th century an anonymous writer, presumably a monk of the abbey, inserted entries providing additional or supplemental information concerning events related to the County of Ribagorza in the 11th/12th centuries.

The Abbey's cartulary records that Bernard Unifred, Count of Ribagorza and his wife are buried there. Indeed, recent archaeological excavations have found a tombstone on the northern wall of the temple memorializing the venerable Count Unifred, "Venerabilis Unifredus Comes".
