= Zaragüelles =

Traditional Baggy trousers of Spain

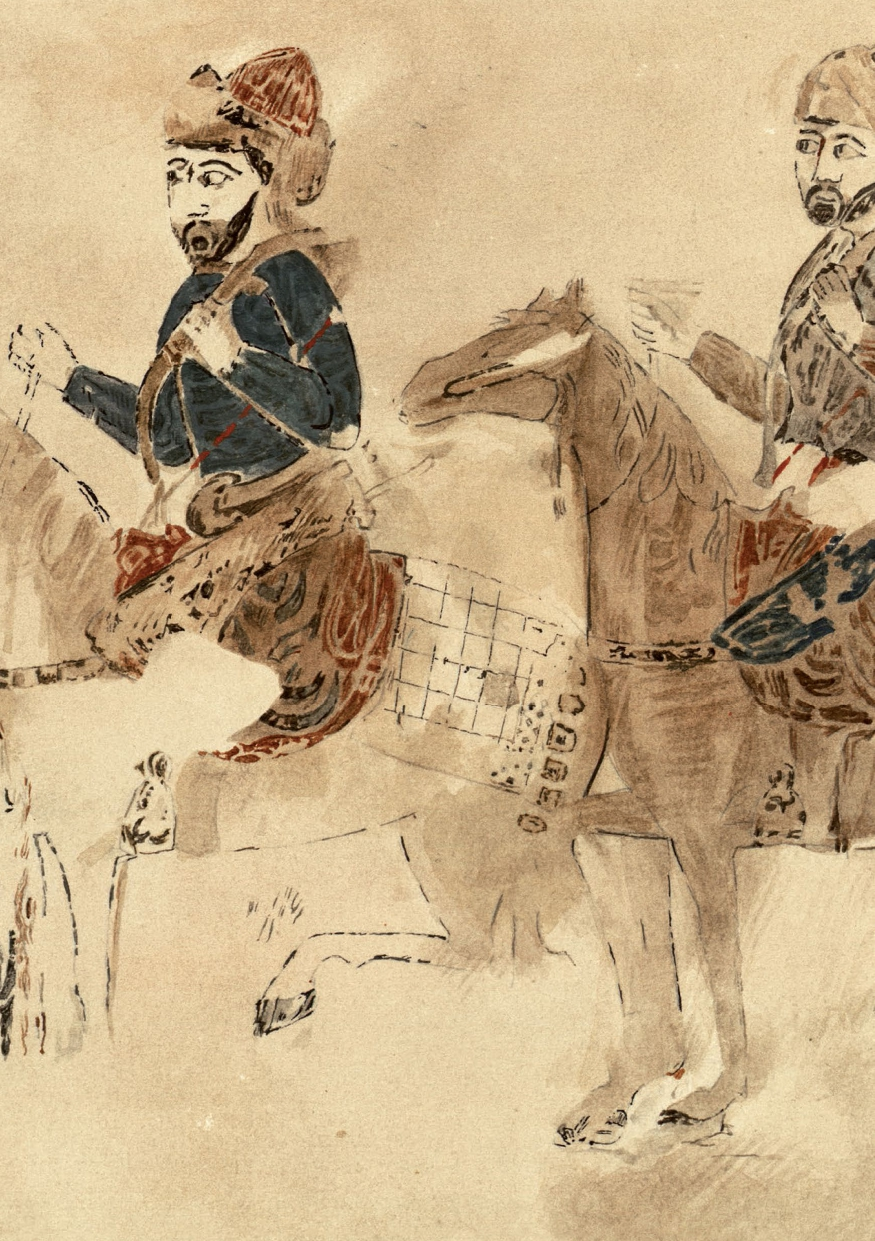
Detail of the watercolor reproducing scenes from the Nasrid paintings of the Partal Palace, 14th century AD, reconstructed in a watercolor made by Isidoro Marín between 1921 and 1922.

Zaragüelles (Andalusi Arabic: sarāwīl, Spanish: Zaragüelles) are a type of trousers or breeches of Andalusian origin. Present in the clothing of common people in Spain since the Middle Ages. they are preserved today as part of traditional dress in various Spanish regions such as the Valencian Community, the Region of Murcia, the Balearic Islands, Aragon, the Province of Almería, and neighboring areas of Granada.

== Typology ==
Zaragüelles are generally defined as “very wide and voluminous breeches,” which were widely worn among the Spanish peasantry from the 13th century onward, reflecting their origins in Islamic dress. The earliest forms were characterized by a gathered waist, created through a series of Pleats, and a notably low crotch, often extending nearly to the knee, to enhance comfort and mobility. The garment's legs extended below the knees and, in some cases, reached as far as the ankles.

== Popular culture ==
At the beginning of Rinconete y Cortadillo, Miguel de Cervantes describes the character Monipodio as wearing linen Zaragüelles, characterized as wide garments extending down to the ankles.

The Spanish novelist Benito Pérez Galdós also refers to zaragüelles in Chapter XVIII of Tristana (novel), where they appear in a passage from a letter written by Tristana to Horacio, in which she describes scenes involving individuals wearing this traditional garment.

== In regional dress ==
In the Valencian Community, these garments are known as saragüells and form an important element of traditional regional dress. They are typically characterised by their white colour, wide cut, and pleated structure. Designed for both comfort and practicality, they are fitted at the waist and are commonly made from lightweight natural fabrics such as linen or cotton. In some traditional ensembles, they may be worn beneath shorter black outer garments, reflecting regional variations in style and layering.

In the Huerta de Murcia, as well as in other areas of the Seira plain, a closely related form of the garment is traditionally worn. The Murcian zaragüelles closely resemble their Valencian counterparts in both cut and material, being most often made of white linen. Within the cultural context of Murcia, they hold particular significance as part of ceremonial and festive attire. Notably, they are recognised as an official component of traditional dress during the Bando de la Huerta festival, one of the most important cultural celebrations in the city of Murcia.

Beyond Spain, the use of similar garments has also been preserved in Morocco. There, zaragüelles continue to be worn primarily as a practical and comfortable undergarment beneath the Djellaba
