= Villanova, Aragon =

Villanova (Spanish) Bilanoba (Benasquese) Vilanova d'Éssera (Catalan)
- Municipality
- Coat of arms

- Location in Spain
- Coordinates: 42°32′45″N 0°27′39″E
- Country: Spain
- Autonomous community: Aragon
- Province: Huesca
- Comarca: Ribagorza (comarca)
- Municipality: Villanova

Area
  - Total: 7.05 km^{2} (2.72 sq mi)
- Elevation: 982 m (3,222 ft)

Population (2025-01-01)
  - Total: 171
  - Density: 24.3/km^{2} (62.8/sq mi)
- Time zone: UTC+1 (CET)
  - Summer (DST): UTC+2 (CEST)
- Postal code: 22467
- Official language(s): Spanish, Benasquese, Ribagorçan

Villanova (Spanish: [ˌbiʎaˈnoβa]), in Benasquese: Bilanoba or Billanoba, in Catalan: Vilanova d'Éssera (locally [ˌbilaˈnɔβa ˈðeseɾa]), in Aragonese: Vilanova, is a municipality located in the Ribagorza comarca, province of Huesca, Aragon, Spain. According to the 2010 census (INE), the municipality has a population of 154 inhabitants.

The town is located at the foot of the Sierra de Chía range. There are yearly religious celebrations on April 29 in honor of Saint Peter Martyr.

== See also ==
- Ésera/Éssera River
- List of municipalities in Huesca
