= William Isarn =

Count of Ribagorza (d. 1017/1018)

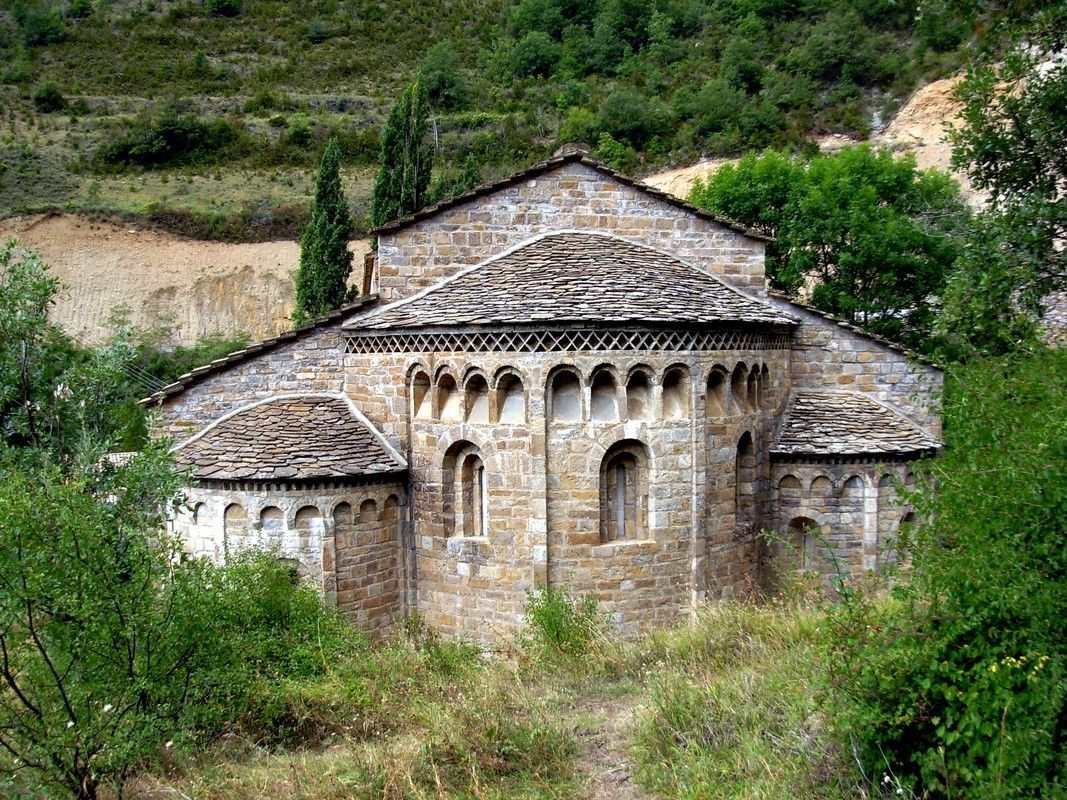
The monastery of Obarra in the valley of the Isábena was liberated from the Muslims by William

William Isarn (Guillermo Isárnez) was the Count of Ribagorza from 1010 until his death in 1017 or 1018. He was a young man when he became party to a power-sharing agreement between his cousin and her husband, sponsored by the Count of Castile. He used a Castilian army to remove the Muslim garrisons from the valley of the Isábena, but before his work of Reconquista could be completed, he was assassinated while trying to reestablish his family's rights in the Val d'Aran. His death provoked a succession crisis that ended in the absorption of Ribagorza into the domains of the King of Navarre.

== Education and succession ==
William was the illegitimate son of Count Isarn Raymond. He spent his childhood in the household of his paternal grandmother, Garsenda of Fezensac, but at puberty was sent to the court of his cousin, Count Sancho García of Castile, the son of his father's sister Ava, in order to learn the art of war. Isarn died in 1003 while fighting off an invasion by the Córdoban hajib Abd al-Malik al-Muzaffar, and was succeeded by his sister Toda. In 1006, another invasion of Ribagorza by Abd al-Malik forced Toda to find a husband in her kinsman Sunyer, count of neighbouring Pallars.

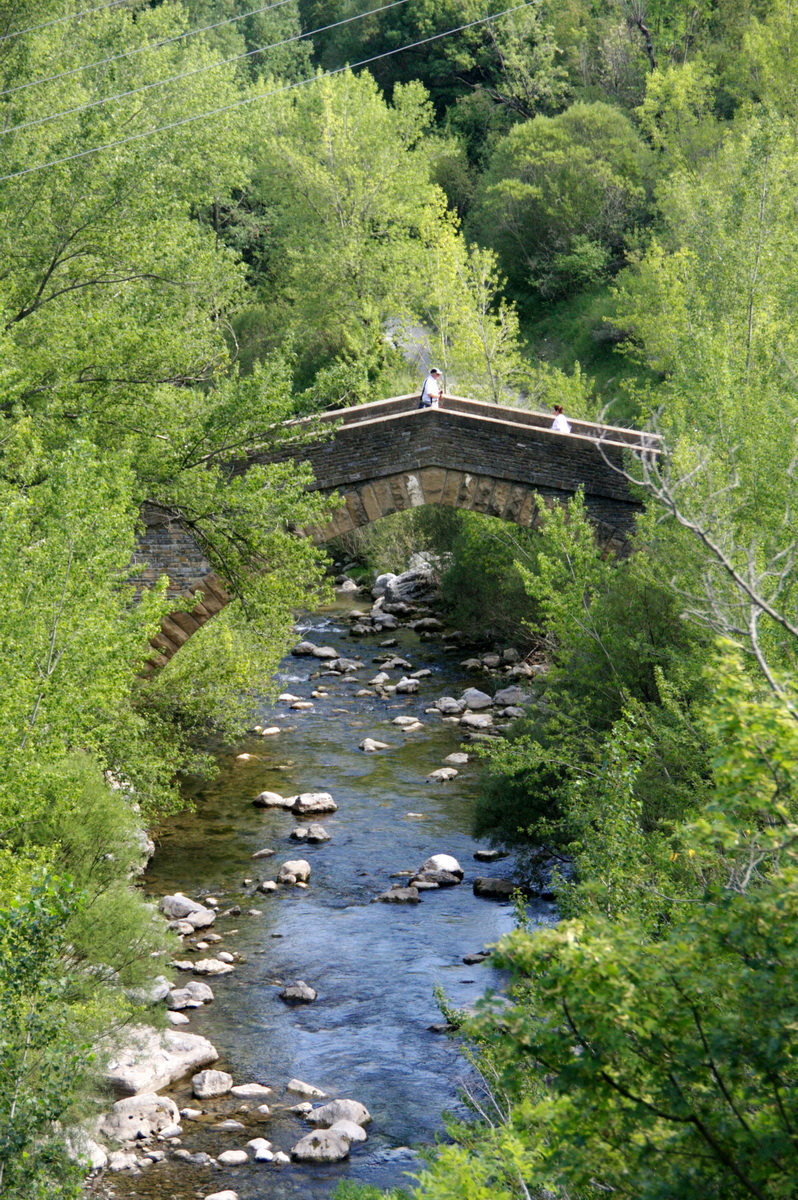
The Isábena as it runs by Obarra

The sudden rise in influence of Pallars over Ribagorza alarmed Toda's relatives in Castile, and the countess sent a missive to her nephew Sancho asking for military assistance in conserving the independence of Ribagorza. The count of Castile sent his sister, Mayor García, who was married to Sunyer's eldest son, the future Raymond III. Toda proclaimed her heir and abdicated in her favour. Sancho also sent the young William, who was given a part in the comital government, with a Castilian army under his command.

The date of the beginning of the rule of Mayor and Raymond III with William Isarn can be narrowed to between 29 March and 3 August 1010. On the fourth kalends of April (29 March) of 1016, William issued a granted alms to the monastery of Santa Maria de Lavaix, and the charter Bishop Borrell of Vic subsequently had drawn up, was subscribed by William as "count, by the grace of God, . . .in his sixth year [of reigning]". The formula "by the grace of God" suggests a claim to sovereignty or independence. On 3 August that year, Raymon and Mayor granted the village of Suert to the same monastery "in the seventh year of their reign".

== Reconquista ==
The Crónica de Alaón renovada, written about 1154, records that Sancho gave his cousin "a great army". With it William proceeded to expel the Córdoban garrisons occupying the valley of the Isábena, and especially the episcopal seat of Roda. According to the Crónica, however, William and his Castilians were unable to liberate the Valle Magna, the Great Valley, of the lower stretch of the river Ésera. His role in the reestablishment of comital authority in lands conquered by the Córdobans was so significant that the monks of Santa María de Obarra in a document dated 6 August, probably from 1012, calculated it to be "the second year of Count William happily reigning, amen". William himself signed the document along with a small number of seniores (lords) or tenentes (lieutenants) who probably comprised his retinue.

== Final campaign and death ==
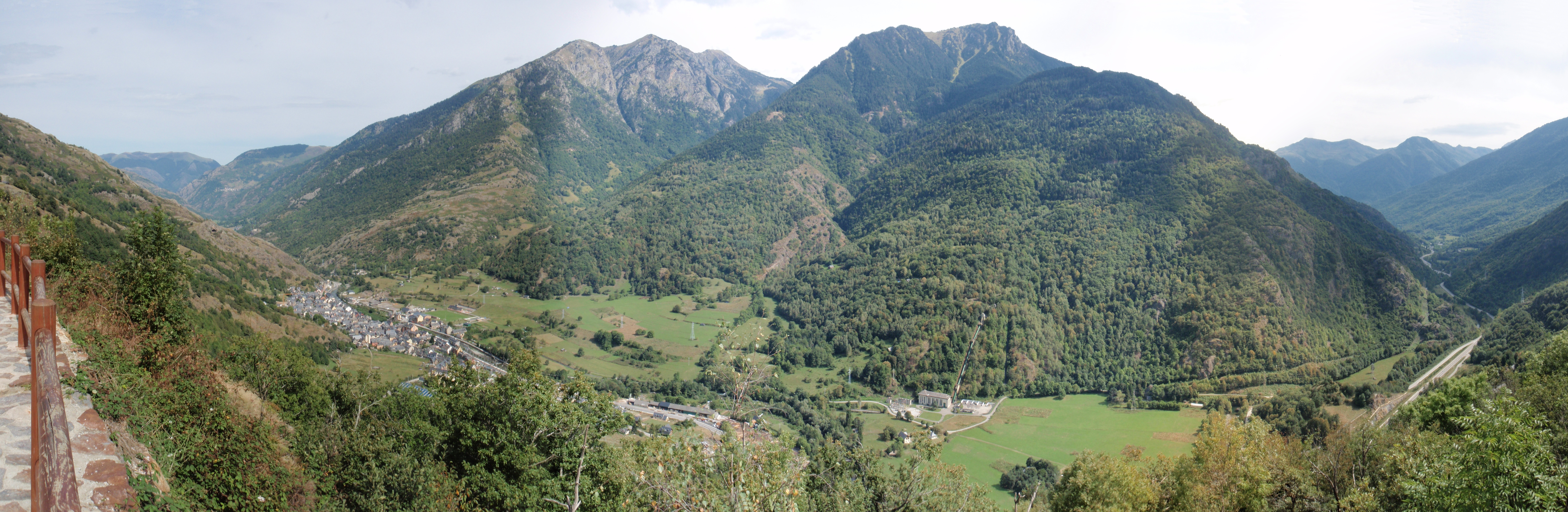
Panoramic view of the Val d'Aran today

On 24 November 1017, in his last known act, William and his optimates (magnates) witnessed the consecration of Borrell, whose election he had confirmed three days earlier (21 November), as the Bishop of Roda. Shortly afterwards, either in that same year or early in 1018, William led an expedition into the Val d'Aran, probably to claim his hereditary rights there. When the domains of his great-great-grandfather, Raymond I, the first independent count of Pallars and Ribagorza, had been divided between his sons, William's great-grandfather Bernard Unifred received Ribagorza, while Bernard's brother Bishop Atto of Roda received the Val d'Aran. According to the Crónica de Alaón, when William tried to reclaim it in the name of his father and grandfather, Raymond II, apparently claiming that it had reverted to his line with the death of Atto, the inhabitants of the valley assassinated him:

This one [William Isarn] the men killed in Aran, [because he was] reclaiming that land, alleging that it had belonged to his father [Isarn] and his grandfather [Raymond II] and above all the bishop Atto, brother of Count Bernard. Upon hearing that he was reclaiming the aforesaid land according to hereditary right, they said among themselves, "This is the heir, come, let us kill him and his inheritance will remain with us".

William's death and that of his protector Count Sancho of Castile only a short while earlier on 5 February 1017 left a vacuum of power in Ribagorza, which was quickly filled by King Sancho III of Pamplona, who had married the count of Castile's daughter Muniadona.
