= Pociello =

- Locality
- Location within Aragon Location within Spain
- Coordinates: 42°12′7″N 0°26′32″E
- Country: Spain
- Autonomous community: Aragon
- Province: Province of Huesca
- Municipality: Capella, Aragon
- Elevation: 567 m (1,860 ft)

Population
  - Total: 12

Pociello is a locality located in the municipality of Capella, Aragon, in Huesca province, Aragon, Spain. As of 2020, it has a population of 12.

== Geography ==
Pociello is located 96km east of Huesca.
