= Llaguarres =

- Locality
- Laguarres
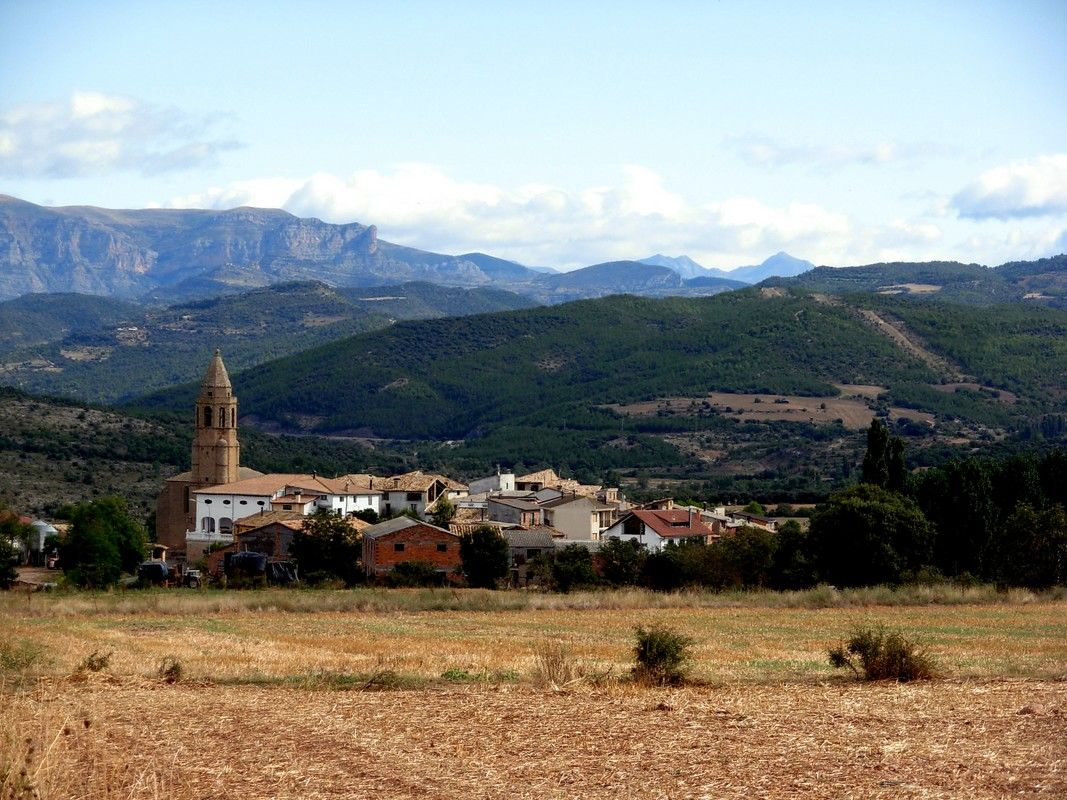

- Location within Aragon Location within Spain
- Coordinates: 42°12′2″N 0°28′3″E
- Country: Spain
- Autonomous community: Aragon
- Province: Province of Huesca
- Municipality: Capella, Aragon
- Elevation: 609 m (1,998 ft)

Population
  - Total: 65

Llaguarres or Laguarres is a locality located in the municipality of Capella, Aragon, in Huesca province, Aragon, Spain. As of 2020, it has a population of 65.

== Geography ==
Llaguarres is located 99km east of Huesca.

== Notable natives ==
- Ramiro Grau Morancho (1957)
