= Roda de Isábena Cathedral =

Church in Roda de Isábena, Spain

Coordinates: 42.291457°N 0.528248°E

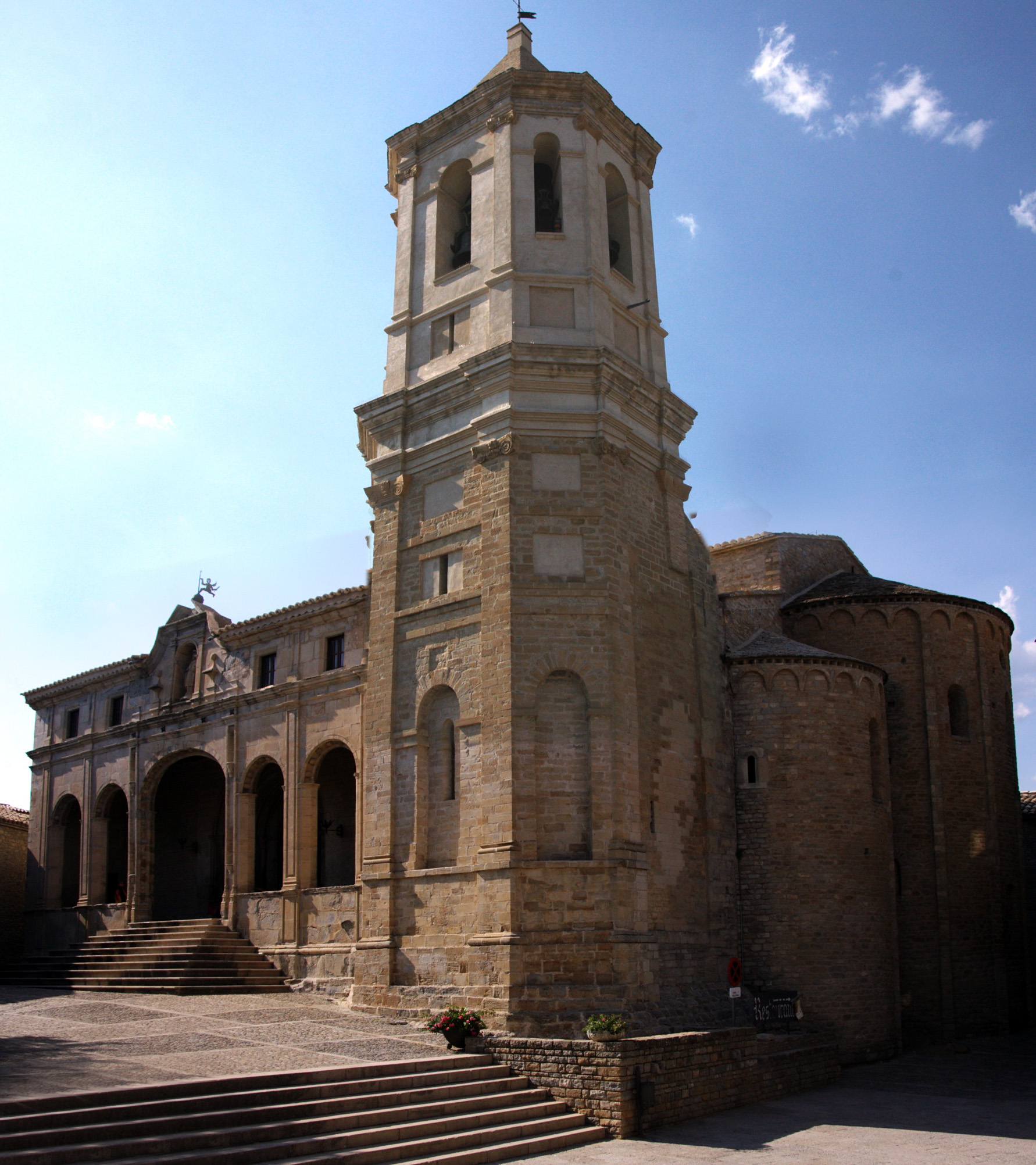
Cathedral of San Vicente

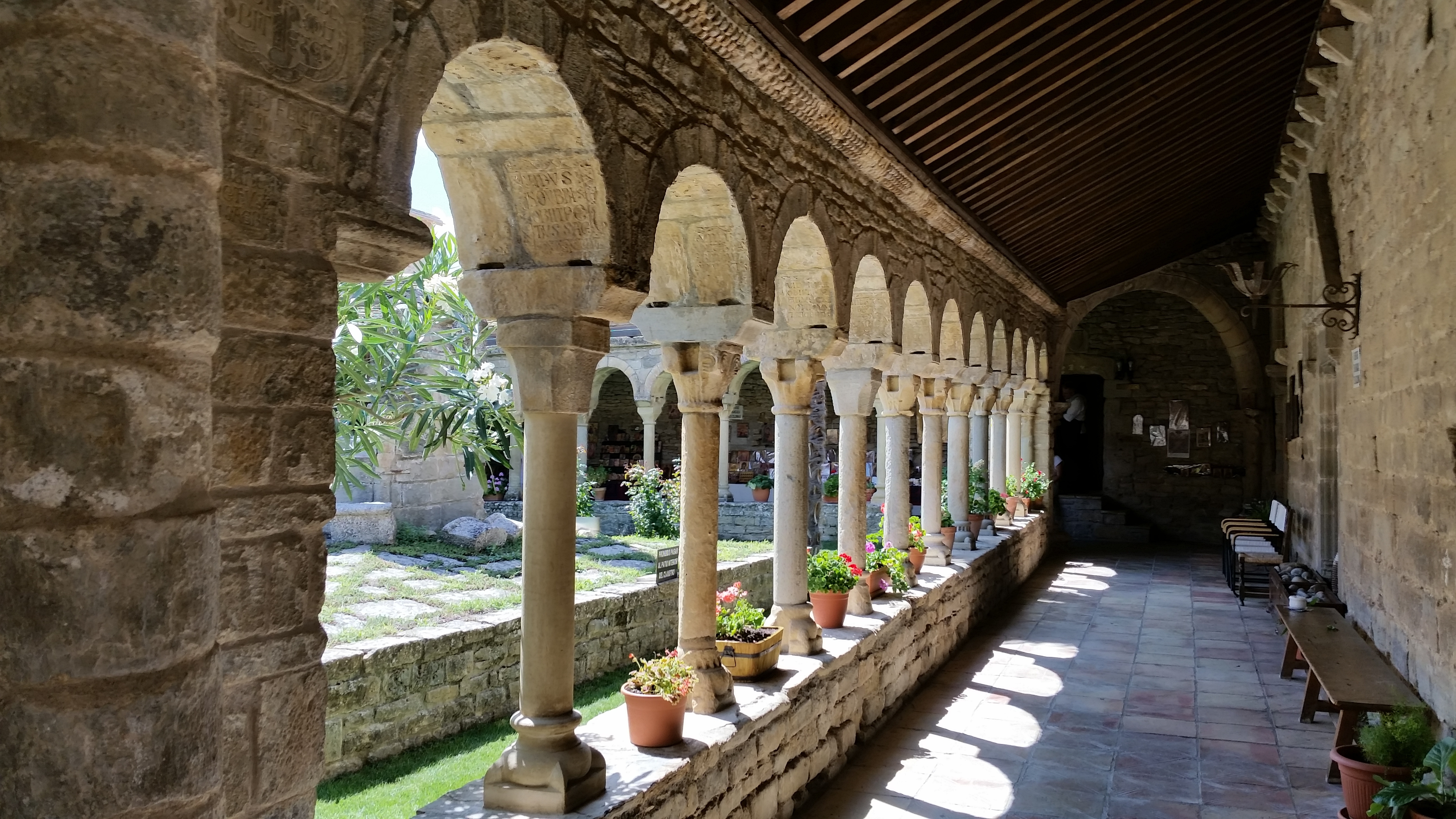
Cloister, Cathedral, Roda de Isabena

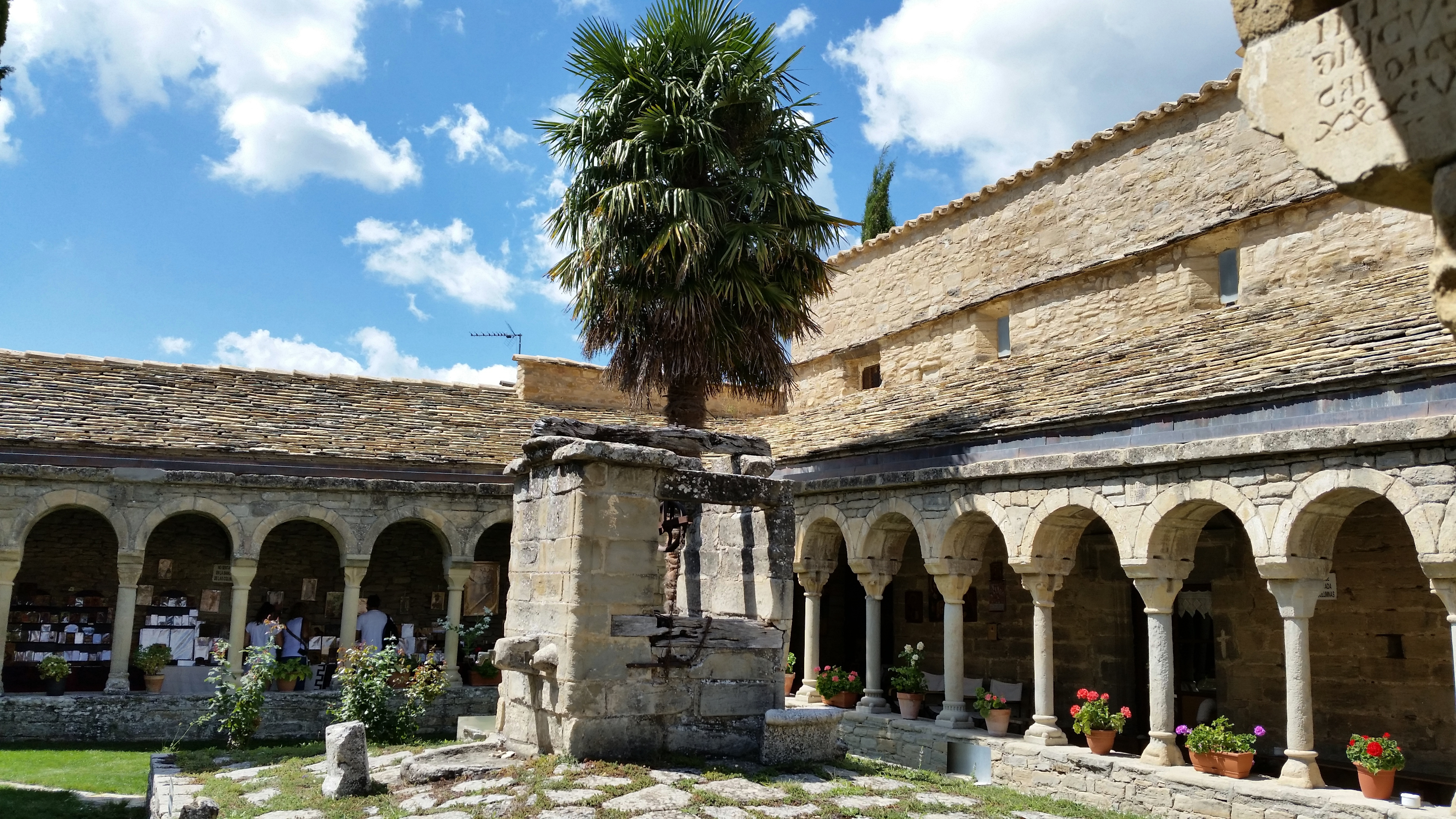
Cloister, Cathedral, Roda de Isabena

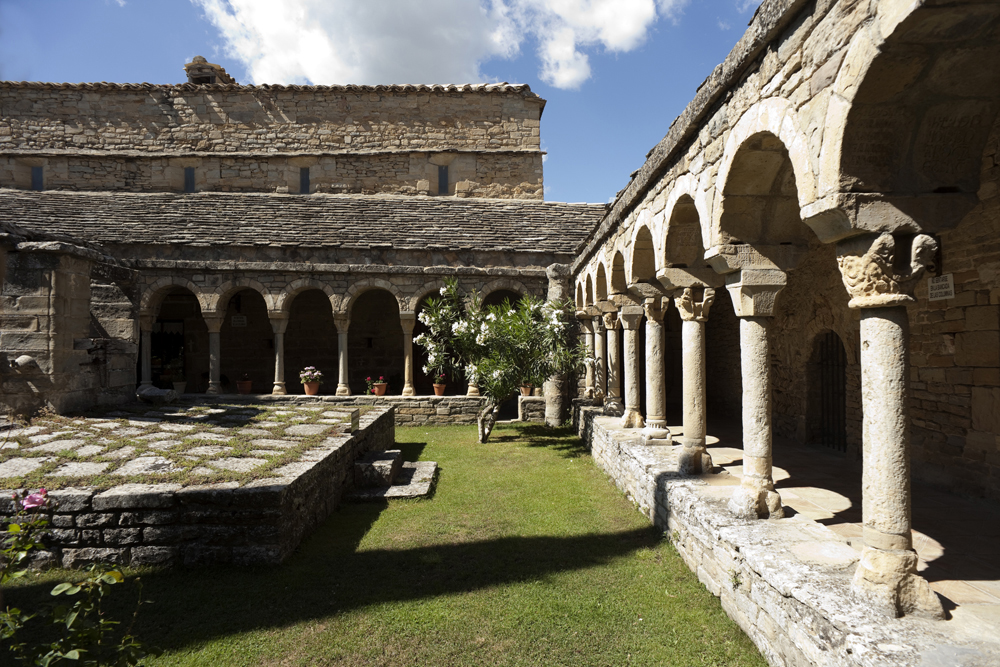

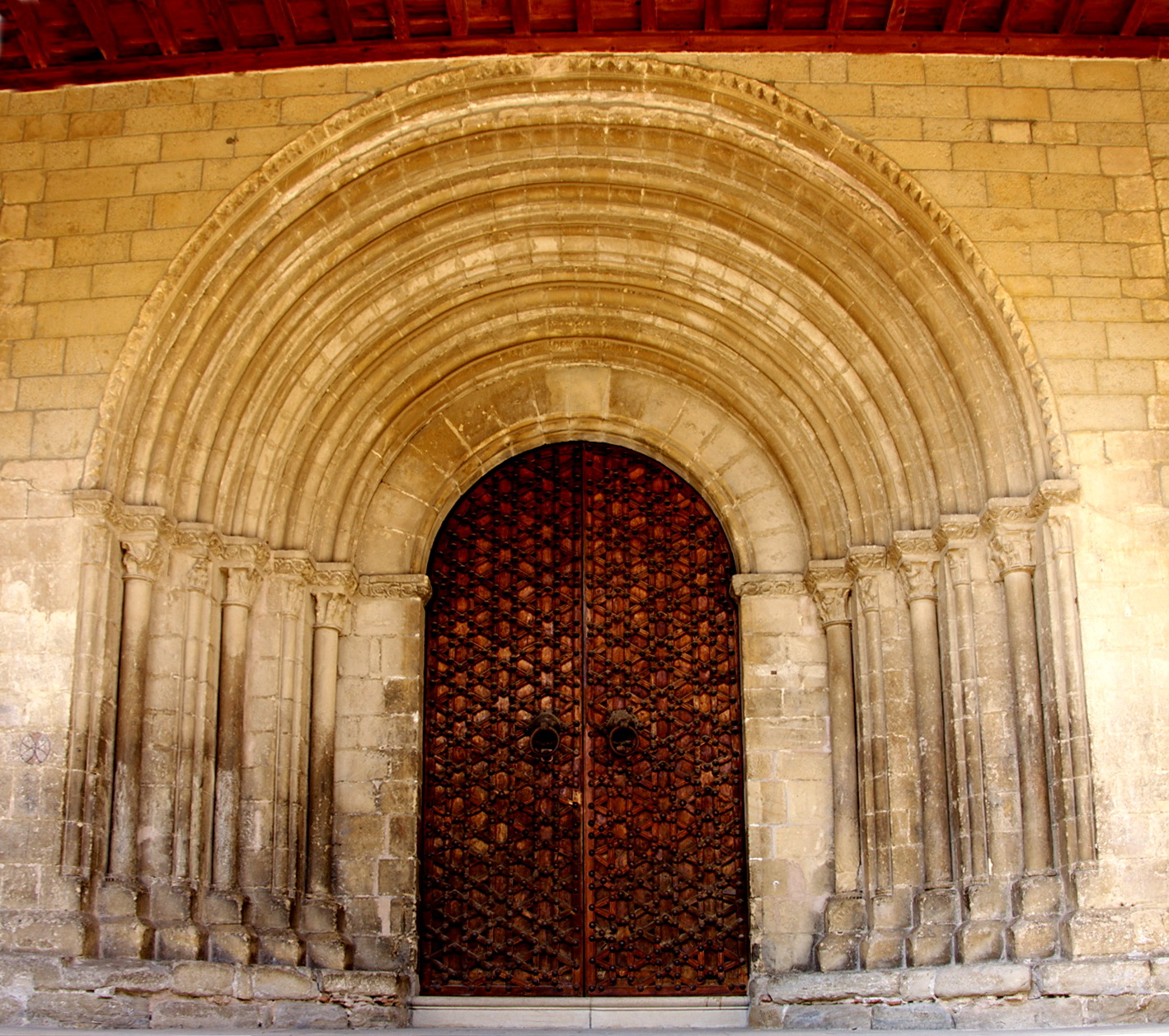
Cathedral door

Cathedral of Saint Vincent is a Roman Catholic church, and former cathedral in Roda de Isábena.

== See also ==
- Catholic Church in Spain
