= Tota of Ribagorza =

Tota or Toda (died 1019) was the suo jure Countess of Ribagorza between 1003 and 1010 and possibly in 1017–1019. She was also Countess of Pallars by marriage to Count Sunyer I of Pallars.

Tota was born to Count Raymond II of Ribagorza and Garsenda de Fezensac, and the sister of Unifredo de Ribagorza (r. 970 - 979), Arnaldo of Ribagorza (r. 979 - 990) and Isarno of Ribagorza (r. 990 - 1003).

Her three brothers succeeded her father one after another. Her first two brothers had no heirs, and were therefore succeeded by their younger brother. Her youngest brother Isarno did leave a son when he died in 1003, William Isarn, but he was illegitimate and lived in Castile, and therefore, Tota of Ribagorza succeeded her brother as ruling countess.

When she succeeded the County of Ribagorza was under threat of the forces of Abd al-Malik al-Muzaffar, and Tota allied with the County of Pallars by a marriage alliance with Count Sunyer I of Pallars. The marriage was childless. As was the custom at the time, her spouse was made co-regent and Count of Ribagorza jure uxoris.

The increasing dominance of the County of Pallars in the County of Ribagorza made Tota contact Sancho García of Castile, son of her sister Ava of Ribagorza, Countess of Castile, and asked for his help against her husband. Sancho García of Castile sent military forces under leadership of Tota's illegitimate nephew William Isarn to intervene. This operation ended in 1010 with the abdication of Tota in favor of her nephew William Isarn, who partitioned the county with his cousin Mayor García of Castile, daughter of Ava of Ribagorza, who also had claim to Ribagorza.

Tota's own position after her abdication in 1010 is not clear. After the death of William Isarn in 1017, she is again noted in official documents as ruling countess of Ribagorza. She attended a ceremony in the church Santos Juan i Pablo de Tella in 1019.
