= José María de Palacio y de Palacio =

Spanish historian, physician, and aristocrat (1915–1997)

José María de Palacio y de Palacio (13 April 1915 – 5 December 1997) was a Spanish physician, historian, and aristocrat.

== Family and education ==
He studied medicine at the Universities of Valencia and Madrid, specializing in psychiatry. In 1945, his father, José María de Palacio y de Velasco, died, making the son 3rd Marquess of Villareal de Álava and 9th Marquess of Casa Palacio. In that same year he was married to María Sacramento de Oriol y Urquijo, sister of the prominent entrepreneur and politician José María Oriol Urquijo.

== Historical research ==
Palacio dedicated most of his career, not to medicine, but to historical scholarship based on the research that he conducted in the National Historical Archive in Madrid, the Archive of the Royal Chancellery of Valladolid, and the General Archive of the Indies in Seville.

=== Genealogy and orders of chivalry ===
Interested in genealogy and nobility, Palacio actively participated in a campaign launched by the Holy See in the early 1950s against unauthorized orders of chivalry. Palacio himself was a member of both the Sovereign Military Order of Malta and the Order of the Holy Sepulchre. As part of his campaign against what he regarded as false orders, in 1954 Palacio published a detailed article in the journal Hidalguía exposing as fraudulent the claims by the Spanish lawyer Eugenio Lascorz (known as "Eugenio Láscaris Comneno") to be the heir to the throne of the Byzantine Empire. This revelation caused a minor scandal within the high society of Madrid at that time.

Palacio was for many years a regular contributor of Hidalguía, a learned journal of genealogy, nobility, and heraldry founded and directed by Vicente de Cadenas y Vicent. In 1964, Palacio published a book on the House of Bourbon-Two Sicilies and of its orders of chivalry: the Constantinian Order of Saint George and the Order of Saint Januarius. This appeared in Spanish, Italian, and French. In 1960, the head of the House of Bourbon-Two Sicilies, Prince Ferdinand Pius, Duke of Castro, had died without male descendants, precipitating a succession dispute that continues to this date. (Note: The Kingdom of the Two Sicilies was abolished in 1861, upon the Proclamation of the Kingdom of Italy, and is extremely unlikely to be restored, as all of Italy has been a republic since 1946. In practice, the more pressing dispute is over the hereditary Grand Mastership of the orders associated with the extinct Kingdom of the Two Sicilies, rather than over the claim to the throne.) Palacio supported the claims of Infante Carlos, Duke of Calabria (the so-called "senior line"), which is also the official position of the current Spanish monarchy.

=== Jews of the Kingdom of Valencia ===
As a historian, Palacio studied the lives of Jews in the Kingdom of Valencia in relationship to Christopher Columbus, the Spanish Inquisition, and the Valencian Bible. With Fr. Miguel de la Pinta y Llorente, he published in 1964 a critical edition of the Inquisitorial proceedings against the converso family of the Renaissance humanist scholar Juan Luis Vives (1493 – 1540).

Although both Pinta and Palacio were very conservative Catholics, their research on Vives's family shocked the Spanish academic world at the time. Vives's biographer and editor Gregorio Mayans (1699 – 1781) had attributed to him a genealogy that connected him to the Valencian aristocracy. Although Américo Castro (exiled in the United States since 1938 because of the Spanish Civil War and its outcome) had suggested in print in 1948 and in 1954 that Vives had actually been of Jewish origins, Castro had not published any detailed evidence on the subject. Meanwhile Spanish nationalist intellectuals in the 1920s–1960s had continued to offer Vives as an examplar of an organic "Hispanicity", following Mayans's account.

The research of Pinta and Palacio established definitively not only that Vives's ancestry was entirely Jewish, but also that several members of his family had been prosecuted by the Inquisition as Judaizers. Vives's father was burned at the stake, while his mother's body was disinterred and burned posthumously. The revelation of Vives's Jewish ancestry and of the fact that both of his parents had been condemned as marranos led Josep Pla to ask in a journalistic piece, published in Destino in 1966,

How is it possible that scholars did not frame the figure of J. L. Vives in his time, in his race, in the circumstances of his life, and in his true nature? Why such mendacity?

Pinta and Palacio published the Inquisitorial proceedings against Vives's mother, Blanquina March. In the critical essay included with that publication, Palacio promised a second volume dedicated to the proceedings against Vives's father. For reasons that are unclear, that volume never appeared.

== Death and succession ==
Palacio died in Madrid in 1997, at the age of 82. He was succeeded in his titles of nobility by his eldest son, José María de Palacio y Oriol.

== Selected works ==
- De Palacio, José María (1954). "Las falsas Órdenes de Caballería. Reflexiones en torno de un Porfyrogénito y Emperador de Byzancio de... vía estrecha, Gran Maestre de la Soberana Orden Imperial de Constantino el Grande y de la Corona Real Eslava de los Wendos (El curioso caso del doctor Lascorz)" [The False Orders of Chivalry. Reflections upon a Porphyrogenitus and Emperor of Byzantium of... narrow gauge, Grand Master of the Sovereign and Imperial Order of Constantine the Great and of the Royal Slavic Crown of the Wends (The Curious Case of Doctor Lascorz)] (PDF). Hidalguía (in Spanish). 2 (4): 73–102.
- De Palacio, José María (1957). "Contribución al estudio de los burgueses y ciudadanos honrados de Cataluña" [Contribution to the study of the burghers and honest citizens of Catalonia]. Hidalguía (in Spanish). 5 (22, 24): 305–320, 661–700.
- De la Pinta, Miguel; de Palacio, José María (1964). Procesos inquisitoriales contra la familia judía de Juan Luis Vives: I Proceso contra Blanquina March, madre del humanista [Inquisitorial proceedings against the Jewish family of Juan Luis Vives: I Trial of Blanquina March, mother of the humanist]. Madrid and Barcelona: Instituto Arias Montano (CSIC).
- De Palacio, José María (1964). La Maison royale des deux Siciles, l'ordre constantinien de Saint Georges et l'ordre de Saint Janvier [The Royal House of the Two Sicilies, the Constantinian Order of Saint George, and the Order of Saint Januarius] (in French). Madrid: Altamira, Talleres Gráficos.

== Sources ==
- Noreña, Carlos G. (1970). Juan Luis Vives. The Hague: Martinus Nijhoff. ISBN 978-94-01-03220-9.
- Calero, Francisco (1995). "Lluis Vives i Roc Chabàs" [Luis Vives and Roque Chabás]. Aguaits (in Catalan) (11): 43–50.
- González González, Enrique (2008). "Juan Luis Vives. Works and Days". In Fantazzi, Charles (ed.). A Companion to Juan Luis Vives. Leiden: Brill. pp. 15–64. doi:10.1163/ej.9789004168541.i-431.6. ISBN 978-90-04-16854-1.
- González González, Enrique (2008). "Fame and Oblivion". In Fantazzi, Charles (ed.). A Companion to Juan Luis Vives. Leiden: Brill. pp. 359–413. doi:10.1163/ej.9789004168541.i-431.45. ISBN 978-90-04-16854-1.
- Unsigned (2013). "José María de Palacio y de Palacio". Gran enciclopèdia catalana (in Catalan). Grup Enciclopèdia.
- Sancho Domingo, Carlos (2017). Eugenio Láscaris-Comneno: el aragonés que pretendió el trono de Grecia [Eugenio Láscaris-Comneno: the Aragonese who Claimed the Throne of Greece] (PDF) (in Spanish). Zaragoza: Institución Fernando el Católico. ISBN 978-8499114651.
- Sainty, Guy Stair (2018). The Constantinian Order of Saint George. Madrid: Boletín Oficial del Estado. ISBN 978-84-340-2506-6.
- Hernández de la Fuente, David (2019). "El fin de Constantinopla y las supuestas herencias nobiliarias bizantinas". In Barrios, Feliciano; Alvarado, Javier (eds.). Aires de grandeza: Hidalgos presuntos y nobles de fantasía [Appearance of Greatness: Alleged Noblemen and Fantasy Nobles] (in Spanish). Madrid: Dykinson. pp. 245–262. ISBN 978-84-1324-092-3.
- Archivos Españoles (2023). "Person - Palacio de Palacio, José María de (1915-1997)". PARES (in Spanish). Ministerio de Cultura y Deporte, Gobierno de España.
