= Capella, Aragon =

Coordinates: 41°11′45″N 00°23′42″E

Capella
- municipality
- Coat of arms
- Interactive map of Capella
- Country: Spain
- Autonomous community: Aragon
- Province: Huesca
- Comarca: Ribagorza

Area
  - Total: 60.7 km^{2} (23.4 sq mi)
- Elevation: 526 m (1,726 ft)

Population (2025-01-01)
  - Total: 361
  - Density: 5.95/km^{2} (15.4/sq mi)
- Time zone: UTC+1 (CET)
  - Summer (DST): UTC+2 (CEST)

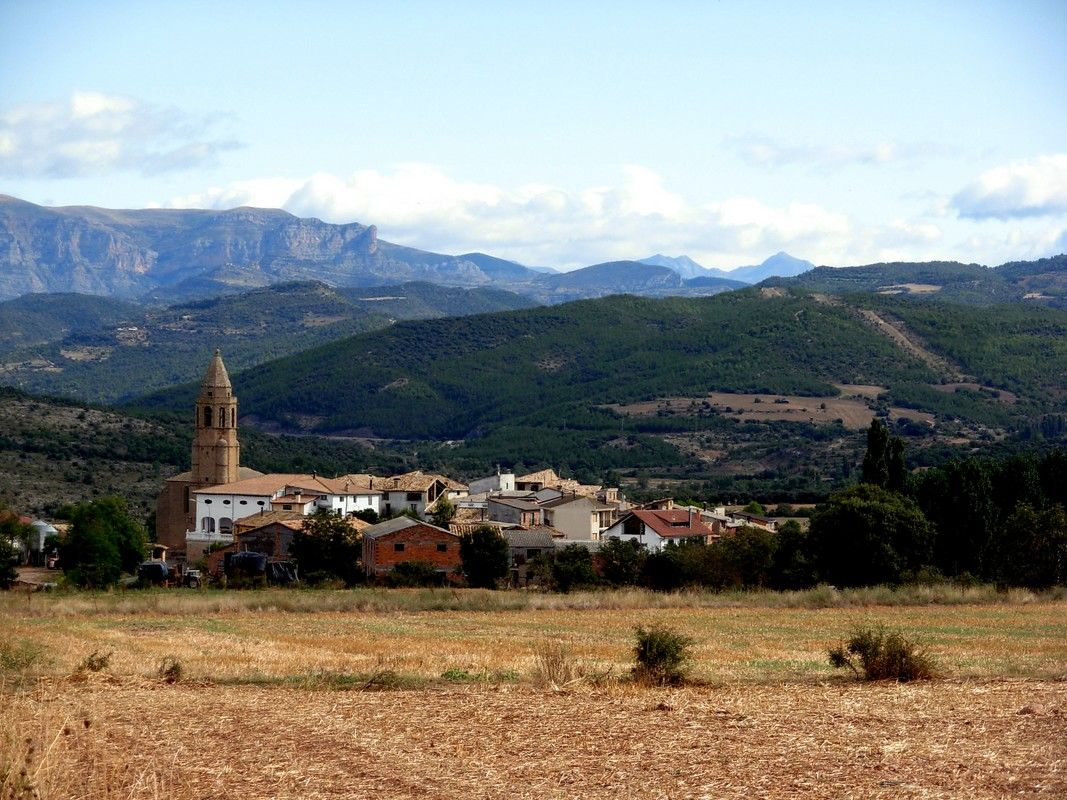
Llaguarres village

Capella (Spanish: [kaˈpeʎa], Aragonese: [kaˈpeʎa], Catalan: [kəˈpeʎə]) is a municipality located in the province of Huesca, Aragon, Spain. According to the 2009 census (INE), the municipality has a population of 382 inhabitants.

== Villages ==
- Capella, 312
- Llaguarres, 75
- Pociello, 17

== See also ==
- List of municipalities in Huesca
