= La Puebla de Castro =

- Municipality
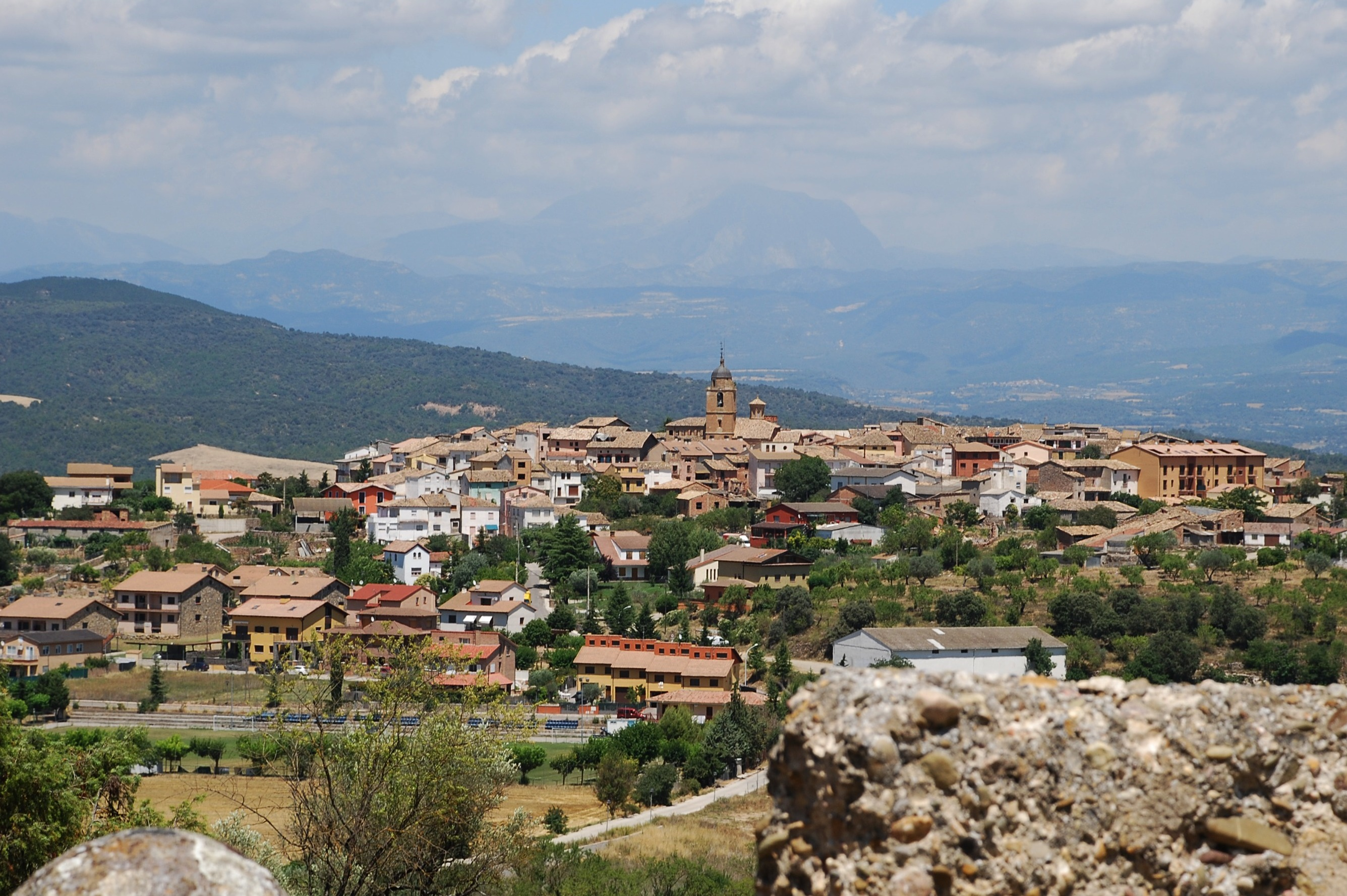

- Coat of arms

- Location of El Pueyo de Araguás within Aragon Location of El Pueyo de Araguás within Spain
- Coordinates: 42°09′N 0°18′E
- Country: Spain
- Autonomous community: Aragon
- Province: Huesca
- Comarca: Ribagorza

Area
  - Total: 29 km^{2} (11 sq mi)

Population (2025-01-01)
  - Total: 430
  - Density: 15/km^{2} (38/sq mi)
- Time zone: UTC+1 (CET)
  - Summer (DST): UTC+2 (CEST)
- Website: lapuebladecastro.com

La Puebla de Castro (Spanish: [la ˈpweβla ðe ˈkastɾo]) is a municipality located in the province of Huesca, Aragon, Spain. According to the 2004 census (INE), the municipality has a population of 372 inhabitants.

== See also ==
- List of municipalities in Huesca
