= Marquess of Villareal de Álava =

Spanish nobility title

Marquessate of Villareal de Álava
- Creation date: 14 November 1889
- Created by: Maria Christina of Austria
- Peerage: Peerage of Spain
- First holder: María del Carmen de Velasco y Palacios, 1st Marchioness of Villareal de Álava
- Present holder: José María de Palacio y Oriol, 4th Marquess of Villareal de Álava

Marquess of Villareal de Álava (Spanish: Marqués de Villareal de Álava) is a hereditary title in the peerage of Spain, granted in 1889 by Maria Christina of Austria, the queen regent, to María del Carmen de Velasco y Palacios, daughter of Juan de Velasco y Fernández de la Cuesta and of María Antonia de Palacios y Gaytán de Ayala.

The title makes reference to the town of Villareal de Álava (known in Basque as Legutio), province of Álava.

== Marquesses of Villareal de Álava (1889) ==
- María del Carmen de Velasco y Palacios, 1st Marchioness of Villareal de Álava (1859–1919)
- José María de Palacio y de Velasco, 2nd Marquess of Villareal de Álava (1882–1945), eldest son of the 1st Marchioness
- José María de Palacio y de Palacio, 3rd Marquess of Villareal de Álava (1915–1997), eldest son of the 2nd Marquess
- José María de Palacio y Oriol, 4th Marquess of Villareal de Álava (b. ?), eldest son of the 3rd Marquess

== See also ==
- Velasco

== Bibliography ==
- Hidalgos de España, Real Asociación de (2018). Elenco de Grandezas y Títulos Nobiliarios Españoles. Ediciones Hidalguía. ISBN 978-84-94841-02-6.
