= Fragmentum historicum ex cartulario Alaonis =

The Fragmentum historicum ex cartulario Alaonis ("historical fragment from the cartulary of Alaón"), also called the Crónica de Alaón renovada ("revised chronicle of Alaón"), is a short, anonymous chronicle of the County of Ribagorza. According to most scholars, it was written in the early fifteenth century by a monk of Alaón, but at least one places its main composition towards 1154. It was first edited and published under the current description by José de la Canal in España Sagrada (46:323–29).

On folio 106r of the cartulary in which the Fragmentum was found is preserved a marginal notice, in a thirteenth-century hand, indicating that a certain presbiter vel monacus (presbyter and monk) named Domingo wrote this codex during the episcopate of Raimundo Dalmacio, Bishop of Roda from 1078 to 1094, during the reign of Sancho Ramírez. From this, Joaquín Traggia Uribarri inferred that Domingo was the author of the Fragmentum and the first historian of Ribagorza, though the Fragmentum is written in a hand of the early fifteenth century. Whoever copied it into the cartulary left only one blank page (folio 104r), which was not sufficient for the whole text, even though the last paragraphs are written in very small letters. The conclusion of the Fragmentum had to be placed on the bottom half of the previous page (folio 103v), leading José de la Canal to incorrectly begin his edition with the text from folio 103v (which begins Adhuc de Episcopis).

The Fragmentum, unlike the near-contemporary Canónica de San Pedro de Taberna (1415), was written in good faith, although its author may have intended to lend it greater credibility by copying it into the generally much older cartulary. Internal evidence also suggests that the historian was a learned man of the fifteenth, not the twelfth, century. He gives the correct etymology (inconceivable in the twelfth century) of Sobrarbe (from super Arbem, above mount Arbe) and notes correctly that Ribagorza was called Barbitania in ancient times. He incorrectly asserts that Sancho the Great passed on the kingdom of Sobrarbe and Ribagorza to his son Ramiro I, while in fact it was Gonzalo. His chronology of the counts of Ribagorza indicates that he had access to the archives of Alaón and Obarra, and he notifies the reader that the act of consecration of bishop Borrell can be found in the archives of the Cathedral of Urgell. In his dependence on archival material the anonymous historian Fragmentum was writing on the cusp of modernity.
