= Chía, Aragon =

Chía
- Municipality
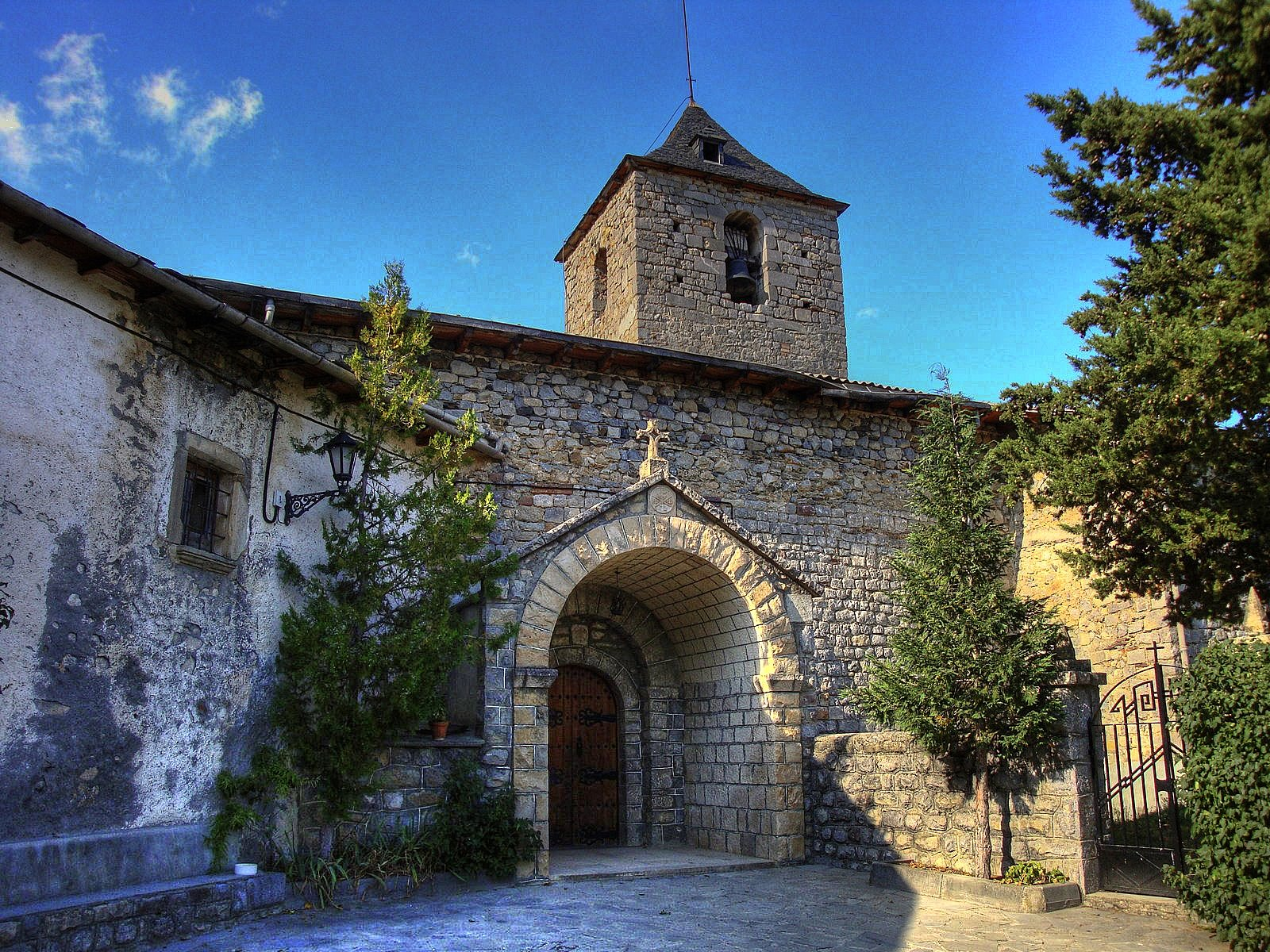

- Location in Spain
- Coordinates: 42°31′15″N 0°27′57″E
- Country: Spain
- Autonomous community: Aragon
- Province: Huesca
- Comarca: Ribagorza

Government
  - Mayor: Enrique Barrau Pallaruelo (PP de Aragón)

Area
  - Total: 25.95 km^{2} (10.02 sq mi)
- Elevation: 1,195 m (3,921 ft)

Population (2025-01-01)
  - Total: 90
  - Density: 3.5/km^{2} (9.0/sq mi)
- Demonym: Chianos/chienses
- Time zone: UTC+1 (CET)
  - Summer (DST): UTC+2 (CEST)
- Postal code: 22465

Chía (Spanish: [ˈtʃi.a]); locally [ˈtʃi.a]) is a municipality in Aragon in the province of Huesca, with an area of 25.95 km^{2} and a population of 86 inhabitants (2018).

== See also ==
- List of municipalities in Huesca
