= Teodoro Láscaris =

20th century Spanish pretender to Byzantine throne

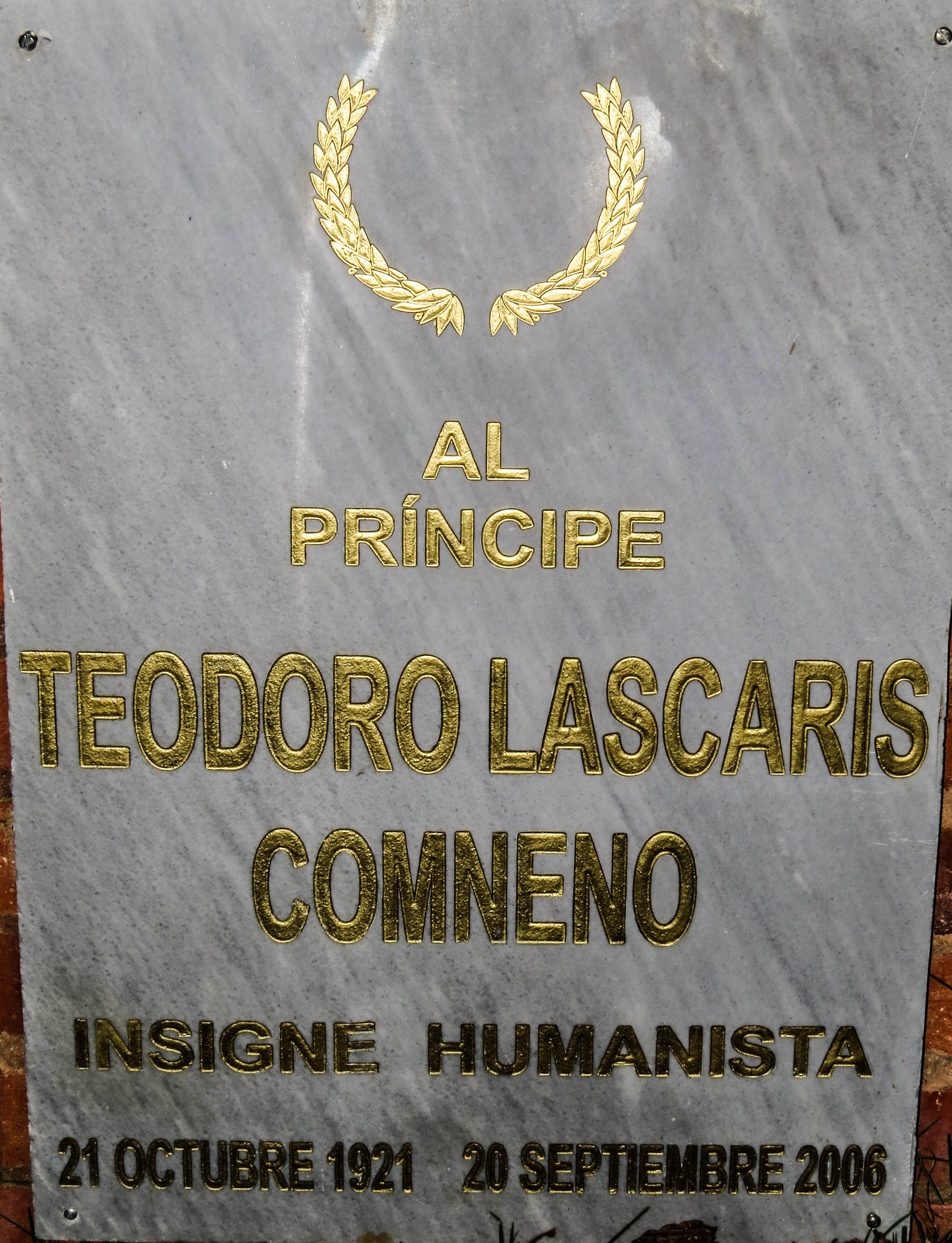
Commemorative plaque in Colombia dedicated to Teodoro Láscaris

Teodoro Láscaris-Comneno (27 October 1921 – 20 September 2006), or just Teodoro Láscaris, was a Spanish Professor of Philosophy and the eldest son of Eugenio Láscaris, a Spanish lawyer who forged documents claiming connections to the medieval Laskaris dynasty, which ruled the Byzantine Empire of Nicaea from 1204 to 1261. After Eugenio's death in 1962, Teodoro continued his father's pretensions, claiming to be the titular Emperor of Constantinople as Theodore IX Lascaris Comnenus, as well as the Grand Master of the Constantinian Order of Saint George.

Láscaris, and several of his siblings, left Spain after the death of their father due to the numerous controversies the family had become embroiled in. Accompanied by his brothers Eugenio and Constantino, Láscaris moved to Latin America and taught at universities in Costa Rica, Venezuela and Colombia. Though he maintained the legitimacy of his father's, and his own, claims, Teodoro was more interested in researching law, history and philosophy and maintaining the orders of Constantine the Great and Saint Helene (an invented order) than he was in pressing the invented claim to the throne of the Kingdom of Greece or Constantinople.

After having taught in Colombia for several years, Láscaris moved to Venezuela, where he became a professor of philosophy at the University of Carabobo. Láscaris propagated the idea that the Americas represent "New Byzantium" and the "Fourth Rome"; where Christian faith, Western thought and Greek civilization will continue to survive. After Teodoro's death in 2006, his son Eugenio (born on 10 October 1975) took the regnal name Eugene III Theodore Emmanuel Lascaris Comnenus, maintaining his family's claims.

== See also ==
- Succession to the Byzantine Empire
