= County of Ribagorza =

Medieval county

County of Ribagorza: Condato de Ribagorza (Aragonese); Comtat de Ribagorça (Catalan); Comitatus Ripacurtiae (Latin)
- 872–1598
- Eastern Spain in 1083
- Capital: Benabarre
- Common languages: Ribagorçan; Old Catalan
- Religion: Roman Catholicism
- Government: Feudal, County
- Count of Ribagorza
  - 872-920: Raymond I (first)
  - 1592-1598: Francis (last)
- Historical era: Middle Ages
  - Established: 872
  - Disestablished: 1598
Preceded by	Succeeded by
Al-Andalus	Crown of Aragon; Kingdom of Navarre
- Today part of: Spain

The County of Ribagorza or Ribagorça (Aragonese: Condato de Ribagorza; Catalan: Comtat de Ribagorça; Latin: Comitatus Ripacurtiae) was a medieval county on the southern side of the Pyrenees, including the northeast of modern Aragón and part of the northwest of modern Catalonia, both in Spain. It was originally the independent creation of a local dynasty, later absorbed into the Kingdom of Navarre and then into the Crown of Aragon. It had a strong historical connection with the neighboring counties of Sobrarbe (to the west) and Pallars (to the east). Its territory consisted of the valleys of the rivers Ésera, Isábena, and Noguera Ribagorzana. The seat of its counts was at Benabarre. Other notable towns include Benasque, Graus and Pont de Suert. Today the western portion of the county roughly corresponds to the Aragonese comarca of Ribagorza, with its administrative centre in Graus; the eastern portion roughly corresponds to the Catalan comarca of Alta Ribagorça.

The first history of the region was written in the early fifteenth century and preserved in a fragmentum historicum ex cartulario Alaonis (historical fragment from a cartulary of Alaon), though a genealogy of the ruling dynasty of counts perhaps dating from the early 11th century appears in the Códice de Roda.

== List of counts ==
- Raymond I of Pallars and Ribagorza (872–920), son of Lupe, count of Bigorre. After his death his lands were divided among his four sons, two ruling jointly in Pallars, two in Ribagorza
- Miro (920–?), son of Raymond I, jointly with brother Bernard I
- Bernard I Humfred (I) (920 – 950/955), son of Raymond I, jointly with brother Miro. Through his marriage to Toda Galíndez of Aragon he and his successors were (sometimes only nominally) also counts of Sobrarbe.
- Raymond II (950/955 – 970), son of Bernard I
- Humfred (II) (970–979), son of Raymond II
- Arnold (979–990), son of Raymond II
- Isarn (990–1003), son of Raymond II
- Tota (1003–1010), daughter of Raymond II
- Partitioned following intervention by Sancho García of Castile
  - William Isarn (1010–1018), illegitimate son of Isarn
  - Mayor García (1010–1025), granddaughter of Raymond II and sister of Sancho García of Castile, until 1019/20 she claimed the county jointly with her husband
  - Raymond III of Pallars, (1010–1025), distant cousin (both descended from Raymond I) and husband of Mayor García, he was co-claimant until their 1019/20 divorce, then counter-claimant
- Sancho III of Pamplona (1018–1035), ruler first of William Isarn's portion, then of the entire county by conquest and submission, he married Muniadona of Castile, niece and eventual heiress of Mayor García and great-granddaughter of Raymond II
- Gonzalo (1035–1045), son of Sancho III, ruled as regulus (petty king) or rex (king) of Ribagorza and Sobrarbe
- Absorbed into the territories of his brother Ramiro I of Aragon on Gonzalo's death, on occasion created as an appanage.
  - Sancho Ramírez, illegitimate son of Ramiro I and half-brother of king Sancho Ramírez.
  - Peter I of Aragon and Navarre appeared as King of Ribagorza and Sobrarbe during the reign of his father, king Sancho Ramírez.
  - Peter (1322–1381), a younger son of James II of Aragon.
  - Alfonso of Aragon and Foix (1381–1412), son of Peter
  - Alfonso of Aragon and Eiximenis (1412–1425), son of Alfonso, following his death the county reverted to the crown of Aragon
  - Alfonso (1469–1485), illegitimate son of John II of Aragon
  - John (1485–1512), illegitimate son of predecessor Alfonso
  - Alfonso (1512–1533), son of John
  - Martin (1533–1565 and 1573–1581), son of Alfonso
  - John Alfonso (1565–1573), son of Martin
  - Ferdinand (1581–1592), son of Martin
  - Francis (1592–1598), son of Martin

== See also ==
- Ribagorçan dialect
