= Sopeira =

Coordinates: 42.317°N 0.747°E

- municipality
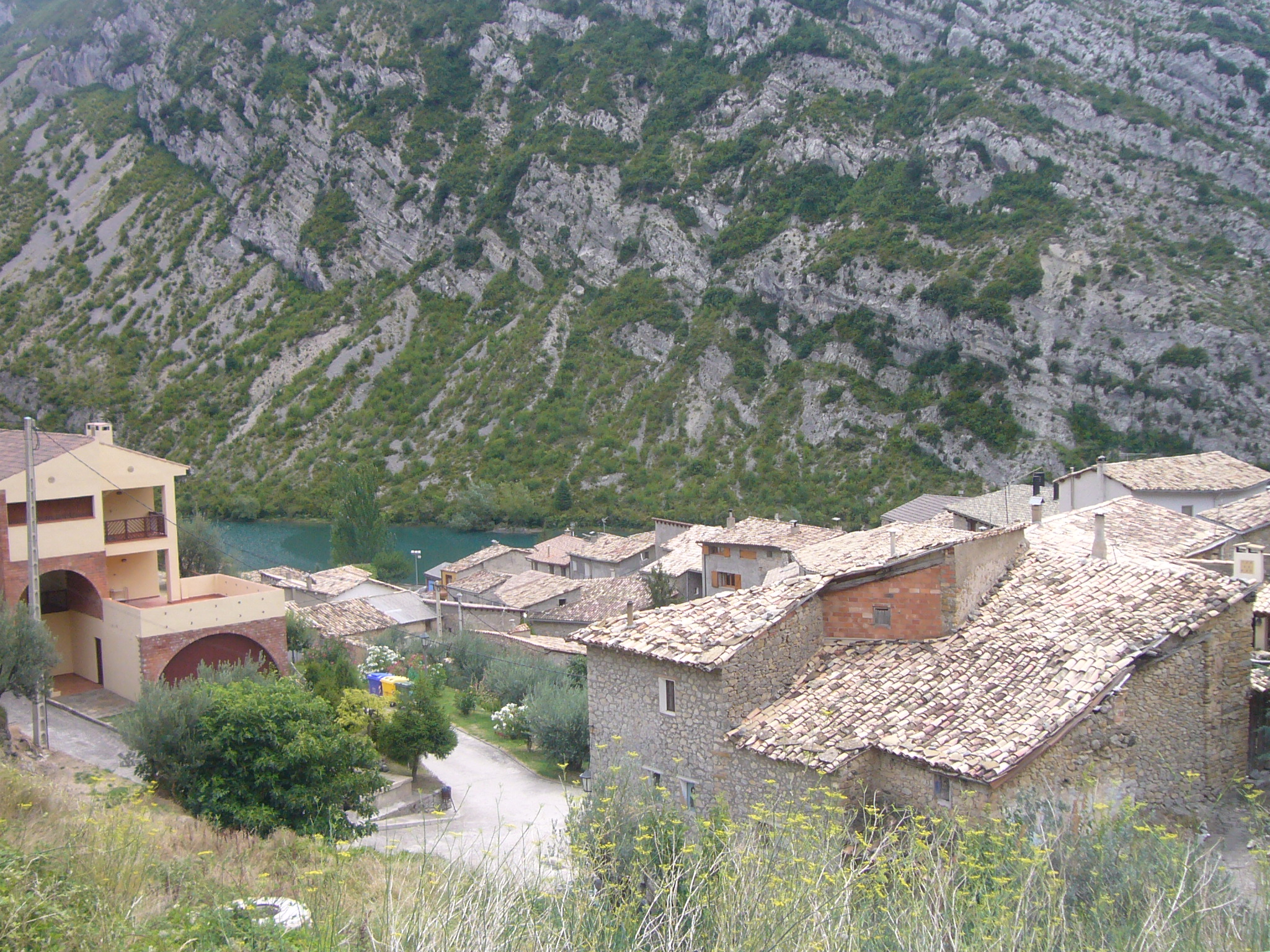
- A picture of Sopeira as seen from the road, with the Noguera Ribagorzana at the background

- Coat of arms
- Interactive map of Sopeira
- Country: Spain
- Autonomous community: Aragon
- Province: Huesca
- Municipality: Sopeira

Area
  - Total: 44 km^{2} (17 sq mi)

Population (2025-01-01)
  - Total: 84
  - Density: 1.9/km^{2} (4.9/sq mi)
- Time zone: UTC+1 (CET)
  - Summer (DST): UTC+2 (CEST)

Sopeira (Spanish: [soˈpejɾa]; locally [soˈpejɾa]) is a municipality located in the province of Huesca, Aragon, Spain. According to the 2004 census (INE), the municipality has a population of 100 inhabitants.

The restored Romanesque Abbey of Santa María de Alaón, a former Benedictine monastery of the 12th century, is located here.
