= Seira, Aragon =

Coordinates: 42°28′49″N 00°25′48″W

Seira
- Interactive map of Seira
- Country: Spain
- Autonomous community: Aragon
- Province: Huesca
- Comarca: Ribagorza (comarca)

Area
  - Total: 69.4 km^{2} (26.8 sq mi)
- Elevation: 810 m (2,660 ft)

Population (2025-01-01)
  - Total: 149
- Demonym(s): Seirano, Seirana
- Time zone: UTC+1 (CET)
  - Summer (DST): UTC+2 (CEST)

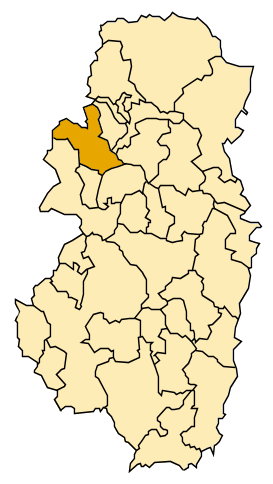
Location of Seira in the Ribagorza comarca

Seira (Spanish: [ˈsejɾa]; locally [ˈsejɾa]) is a municipality located in the Ribagorza comarca, province of Huesca, Aragon, Spain. According to the 2018 census the municipality has a population of 150 inhabitants. Its postal code is 22463.

The town is located on the left side of the Ésera River in a very mountainous place.

== See also ==
- List of municipalities in Huesca
