= Ribagorza (comarca) =

Coordinates: 42°27′N 00°32′E

Ribagorza / Ribagorça
- Comarca
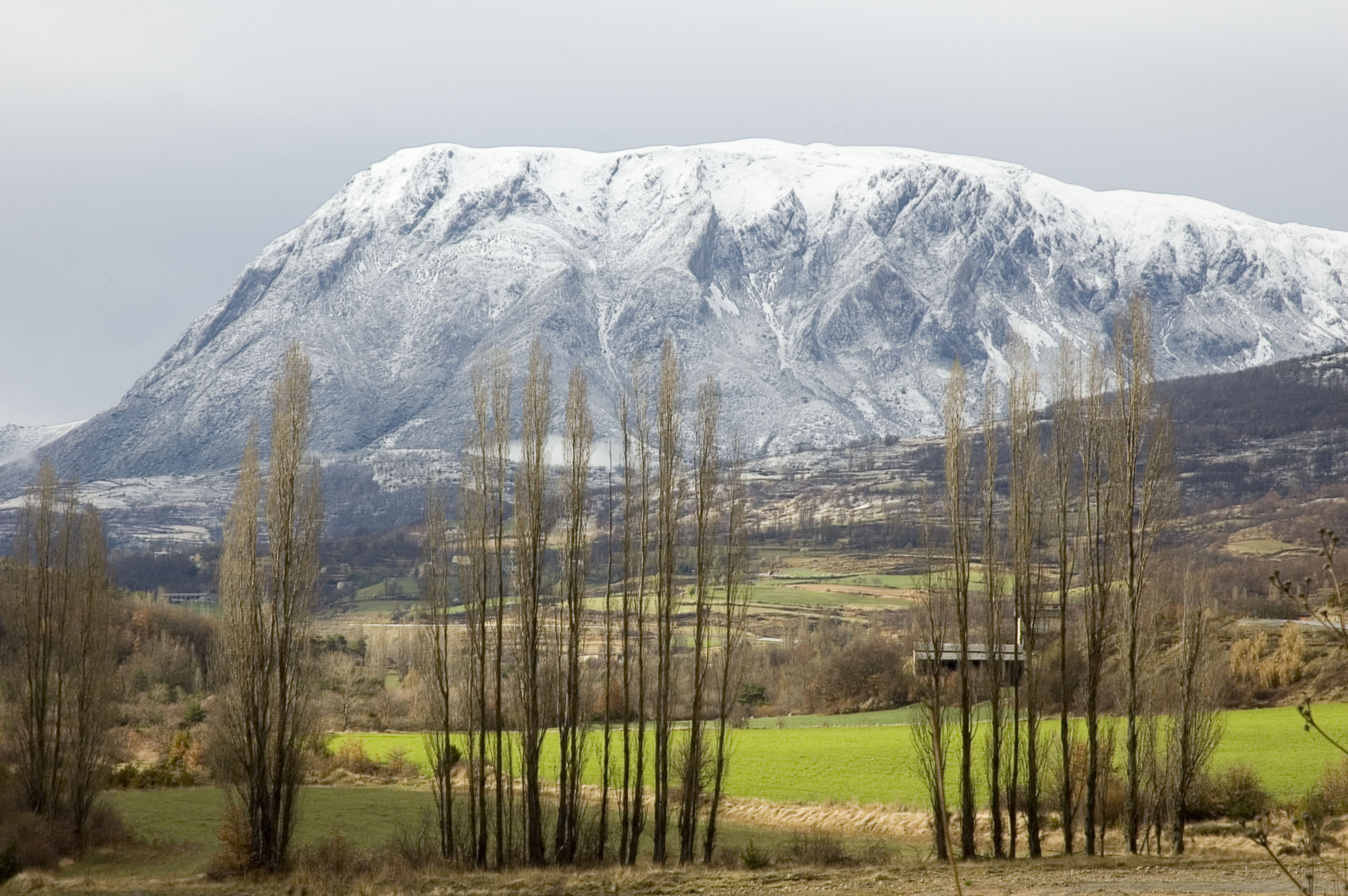
- El Turbón

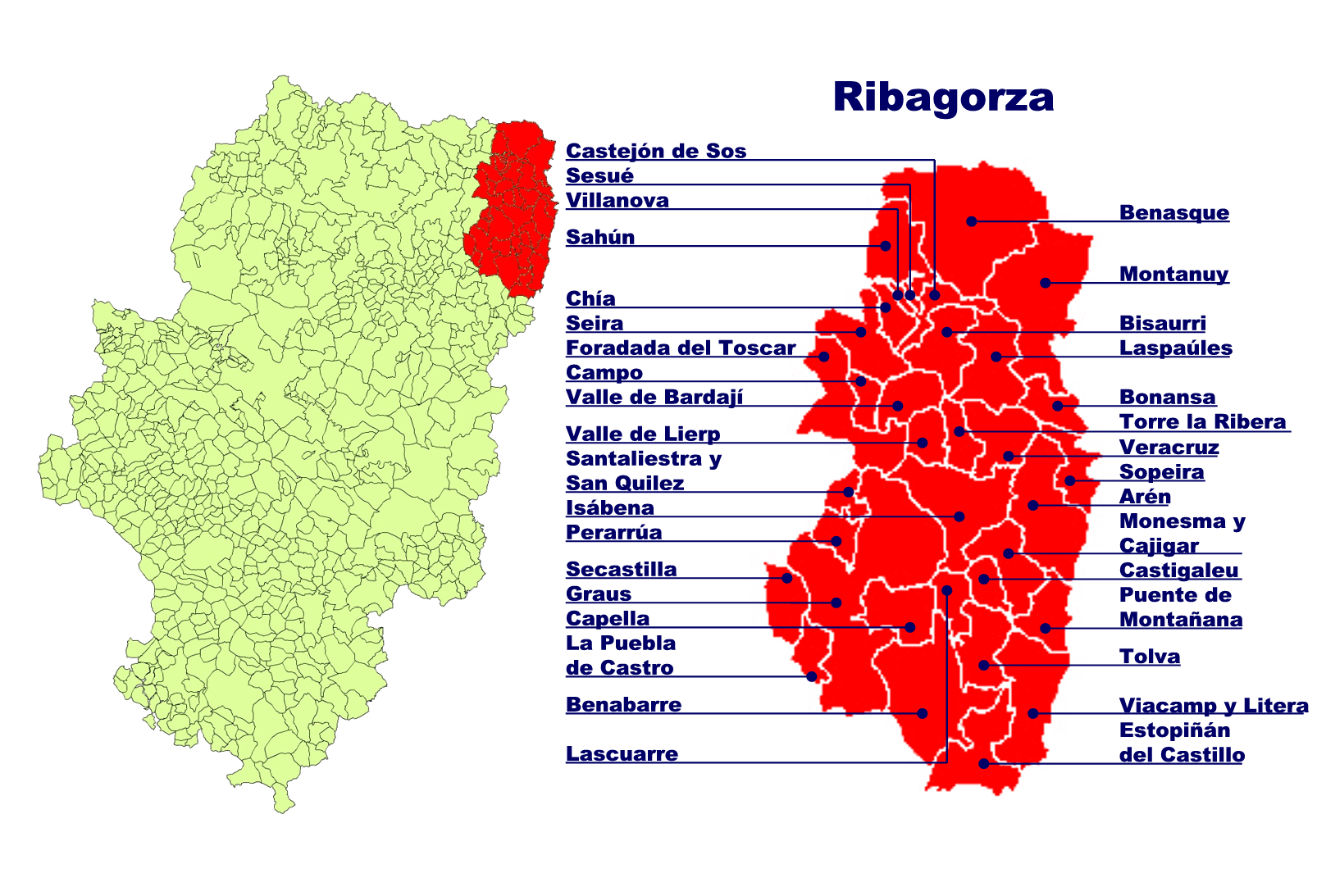
- Country: Spain
- Autonomous community: Aragon
- Province: Huesca
- Capital city: Graus
- Municipalities: List: See text

Area
  - Total: 2,459.8 km^{2} (949.7 sq mi)

Population
  - Total: 12,811
  - Density: 5.2081/km^{2} (13.489/sq mi)
- Demonym(s): ribagorzano, -a
- Time zone: UTC+1 (CET)
  - Summer (DST): UTC+2 (CEST)

The Aneto, the highest peak in the Pyrenees, is located in this comarca

Ribagorza (Spanish: [riβaˈɣoɾθa], Aragonese: [ɾiβaˈɣoɾθa]) or Ribagorça (Western Catalan: [riβaˈɣɔɾsa]; French: Ribagorce) is a comarca (administrative subdivision) in Aragon, Spain, situated in the north-east of the province of Huesca. It borders the French département of the Haute-Garonne to the north and Catalonia (the comarques of Val d'Aran, Alta Ribagorça, Pallars Jussà, and Noguera) to the east. Within Aragon its neighboring comarcas are Sobrarbe, Somontano de Barbastro, and La Litera. It roughly corresponds to the Aragonese part of the medieval County of Ribagorza. The administrative capital of Ribagorza is Graus, although the historical capital of the county was at Benabarre.

The Ribagorçan dialect is a transitional Aragonese–Catalan dialect spoken in the western part of the comarca. Municipalities in the eastern part, bordering Catalonia, are part of La Franja, a geolinguistic area, where the local language is a variety of Catalan. However, Aragonese and Catalan form a dialect continuum here and the geographical limit of both languages cannot be drawn in a clear-cut manner.

== Municipalities ==
The Catalan version of the names of the towns are in brackets.

- Arén (Areny de Noguera)
- Benabarre (Benavarri)
- Benasque (Benasc)
- Beranuy
- Bisaurri (Bissaürri)
- Bonansa
- Campo
- Capella
- Castejón de Sos (Castilló de Sos)
- Castigaleu
- Chía (Gia)
- Estopiñán del Castillo (Estopanyà)
- Foradada del Toscar
- Graus
- Isábena (Isàvena)
- Lascuarre (Lasquarri)
- Laspaúles (Les Paüls)
- Monesma y Cajigar (Monesma i Queixigar)
- Montanuy (Montanui)
- Perarrúa (Perarrua)
- La Puebla de Castro (La Pobla del Castre)
- Puente de Montañana (El Pont de Montanyana)
- Sahún (Saünc)
- Santaliestra y San Quílez (Santa Llestra i Sant Quilis)
- Secastilla (Secastella)
- Seira
- Sesué (Sessué)
- Sopeira
- Tolva (Tolba)
- Torre la Ribera (Tor-la-ribera)
- Valle de Bardají (La Vall de Bardaixí)
- Valle de Lierp (La Vall de Lierp)
- Viacamp y Litera (Viacamp i Lliterà)
- Villanova (Vilanova d'Éssera)
