= Isábena =

Coordinates: 42.310°N 0.527°E

Isábena (Spanish) Isàvena (Catalan) Isabana (Aragonese)
- municipality
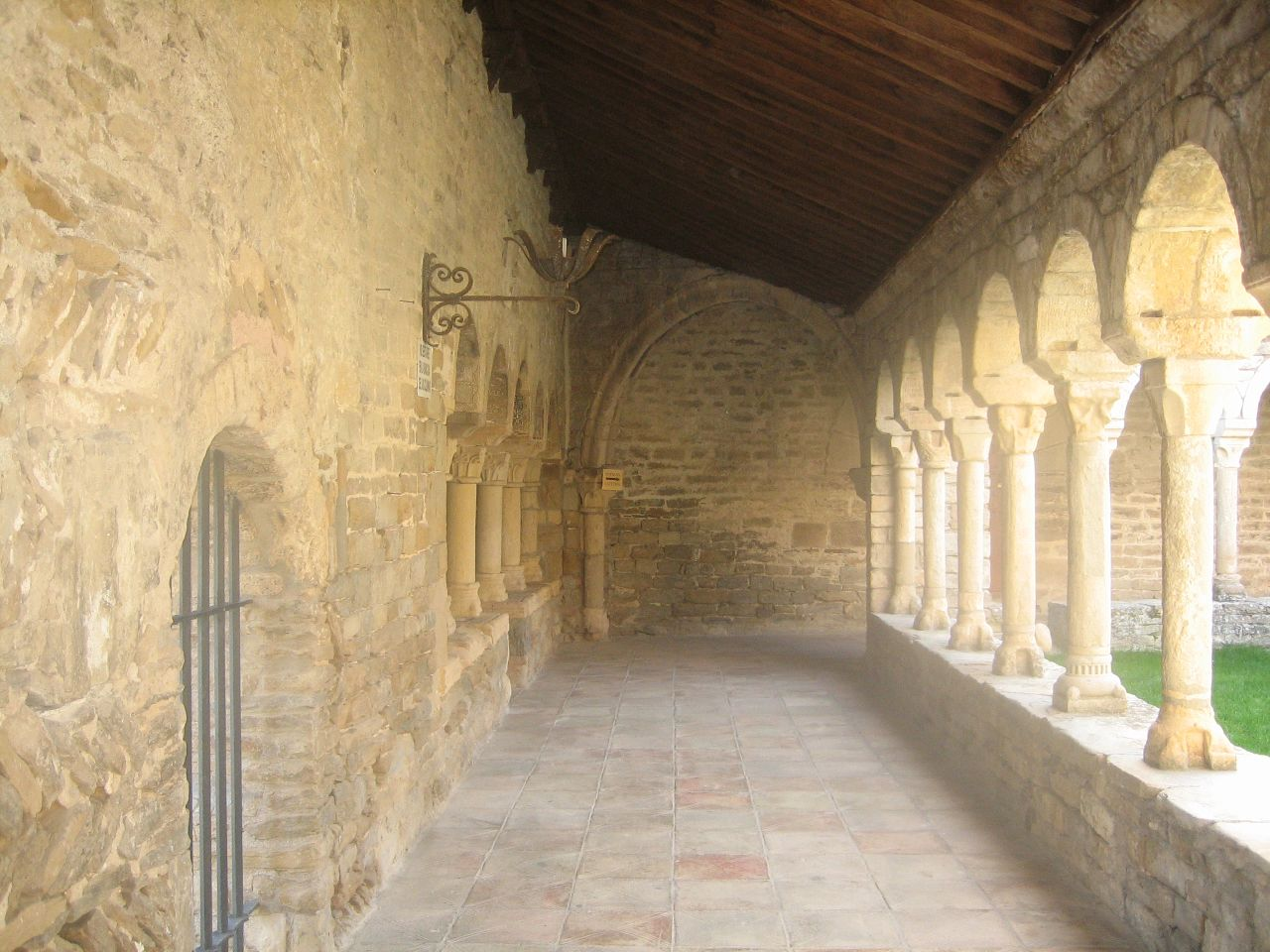
- Interactive map of Isábena (Spanish)
- Country: Spain
- Autonomous community: Aragon
- Province: Huesca
- Comarca: Ribagorza (comarca)

Area
  - Total: 118 km^{2} (46 sq mi)

Population (2025-01-01)
  - Total: 234
  - Density: 1.98/km^{2} (5.14/sq mi)
- Time zone: UTC+1 (CET)
  - Summer (DST): UTC+2 (CEST)

Isábena (Spanish: [iˈsaβena]), in Catalan: Isàvena (locally [iˈzaβena]), or in Aragonese: Isabana, is a municipality located in the province of Huesca, Aragon, Spain. According to the 2004 census (INE), the municipality has a population of 278 inhabitants.

The town is situated at the foot of the rocky Morrón de Güell mountain range.

== Twin towns ==
- (France) Saint-Bertrand-de-Comminges, 2018

== See also ==
- Isábena River
- List of municipalities in Huesca
