= Masonry =

Building of structures from individual units of stone, bricks, or blocks

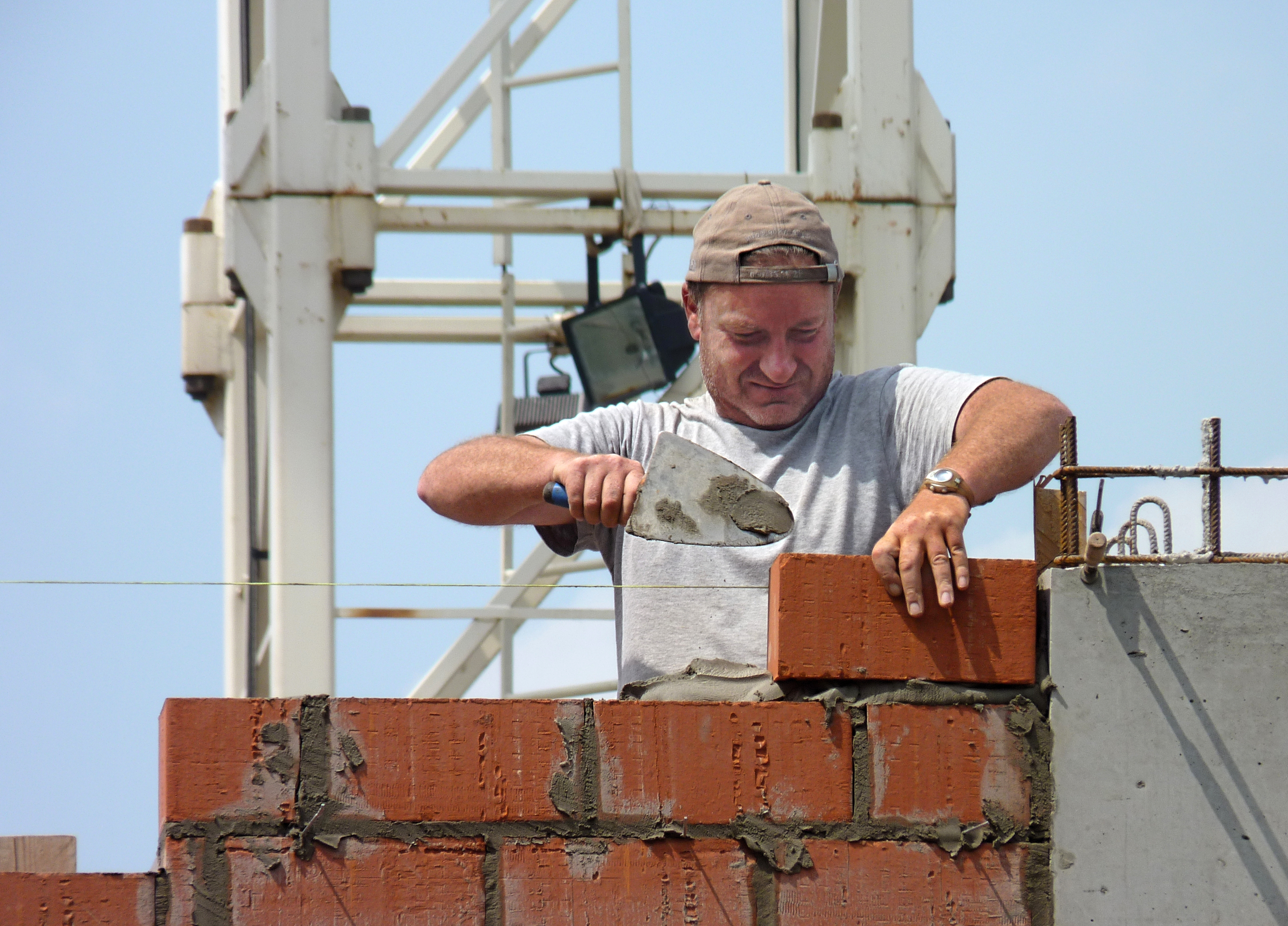
A mason laying a brick on top of the mortar

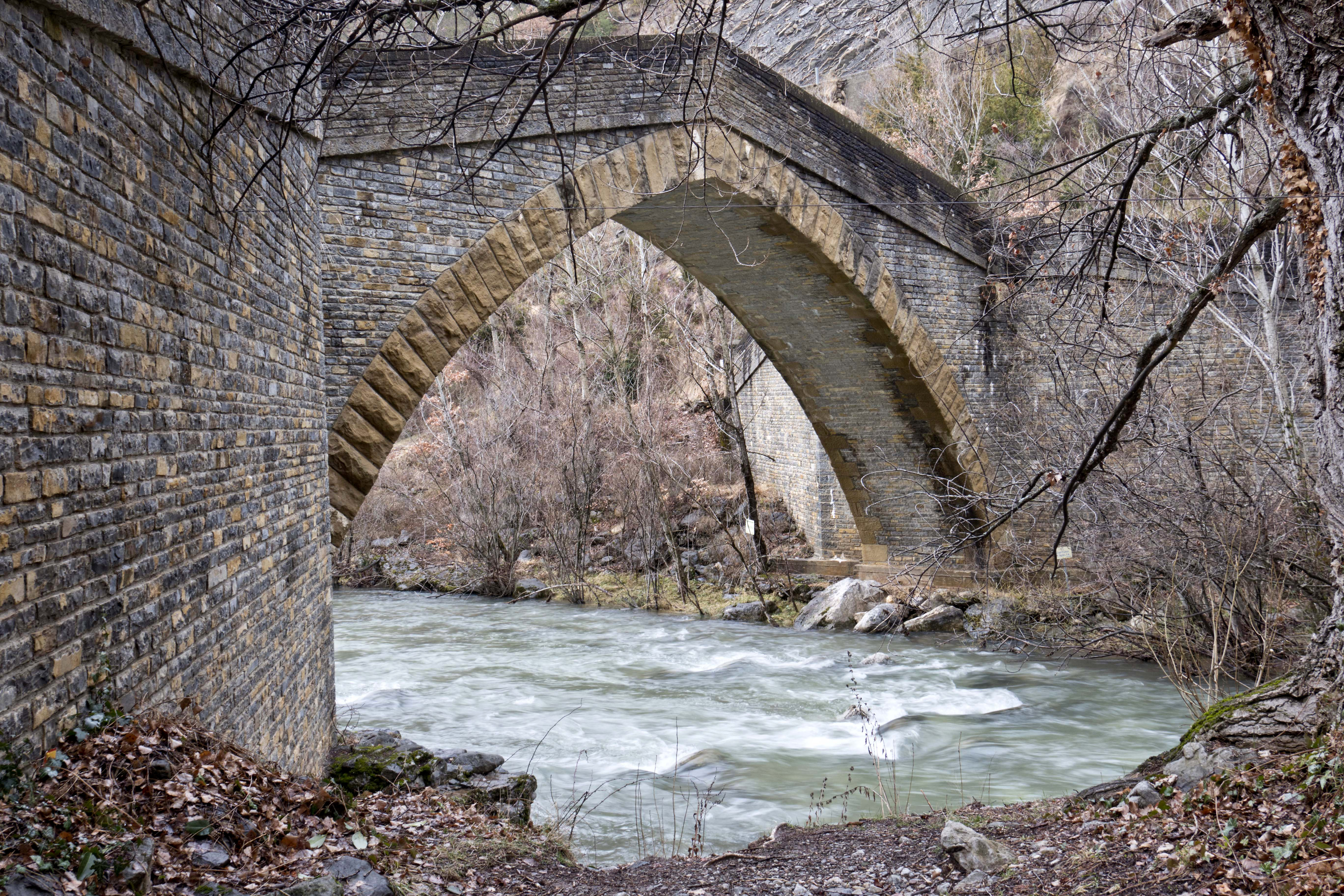
Bridge over the Isábena river in the Monastery of Santa María de Obarra, masonry construction with stones

Masonry is the craft of building a structure with stone, brick, concrete, or similar material, including mortar plastering, which are often laid in, bound, and pasted together by mortar. The term masonry can also refer to the building units (stones, bricks, concrete blocks, etc.) themselves.

The common materials of masonry construction are bricks and building stone; rocks such as granite, marble, and limestone; cast stone, concrete blocks, glass blocks, and adobe. Masonry is generally a highly durable form of construction. However, the materials used, the quality of the mortar and workmanship, and the pattern in which the units are assembled can substantially affect the durability of the overall masonry construction.

A person who constructs masonry is called a mason or bricklayer, or in some places colloquially a "brickie". These are both classified as construction trades.

== History ==
Masonry is one of the oldest building crafts, even predating written history. The construction of Egyptian pyramids, Roman aqueducts, and medieval cathedrals are all examples of masonry. Early structures used the weight of the masonry itself to stabilize the structure against lateral movements. The types and techniques of masonry used evolved with architectural needs and cultural norms. Since the mid-20th century, masonry has often featured steel-reinforced elements to help carry the tension force present in modern thin, light, tall building systems.

== Applications ==
Masonry has both structural and non-structural applications. Structural applications include walls, columns, beams, foundations, load-bearing arches, and others. On the other hand, masonry is also used in non-structural applications such as fireplaces, chimneys and veneer systems.

Brick and concrete block are the most common types of masonry in use in industrialized nations and may be either load-bearing or non-load-bearing. Concrete blocks, especially those with hollow cores, offer various possibilities in masonry construction. They generally provide great compressive strength and are best suited to structures with light transverse loading when the cores remain unfilled. Filling some or all of the cores with concrete or concrete with steel reinforcement (typically rebar) offers much greater tensile and lateral strength to structures.

=== Advantages ===
- The use of materials such as bricks and stones can increase the thermal mass of a building.
- Masonry is a non-combustible product and can protect the building from fire.
- Masonry walls are more resistant to projectiles, such as debris from hurricanes or tornadoes.

=== Disadvantages ===
- Extreme weather, under certain circumstances, can cause degradation of masonry due to expansion and contraction forces associated with freeze-thaw cycles.
- Masonry tends to be heavy and must be built on a stable ground made of either undisturbed or mechanically-compacted soil, otherwise cracking may occur.
- Unlike concrete, masonry construction does not lend itself well to mechanization, and requires more skilled labor.

=== Structural limitations ===
One problem with masonry walls is that they rely mainly on their weight to keep them in place; each block or brick is only loosely connected to the next via a thin layer of mortar. This is why they do not perform well in earthquakes, when entire buildings are shaken horizontally. Many collapses during earthquakes occur in buildings that have load-bearing masonry walls. Besides, heavier buildings having masonry suffer more damage.

== Bonds and patterns ==
In masonry and bricklaying, bonds define the specific structural arrangements in which the stones or bricks and the mortar are laid. Patterns are the visual arrangements on the face of the masonry resulting from their geometric alignment, texture, or colour.

A stretcher is a brick or rectangular cut stone (in its ideal form, an ashlar) laid horizontally with its long, narrow side facing out.

A header is a brick or ashlar laid horizontally with its short end facing out, which ties together the front and back of a thick wall.

A course is a single horizontal row of bricks or cut stones.

=== Headers and stretchers ===
The stonework or brickwork type in which headers are laid alternatingly to stretchers, is called "headers and stretchers" (also "header and stretcher", "header-and-stretcher masonry", "header-and-stretcher construction", "header-stretcher style" etc.).

English bond is a pattern featuring alternating courses of stretchers and headers.

Flemish bond is a pattern where headers and stretchers alternate within the same individual course.

== Dry set masonry ==
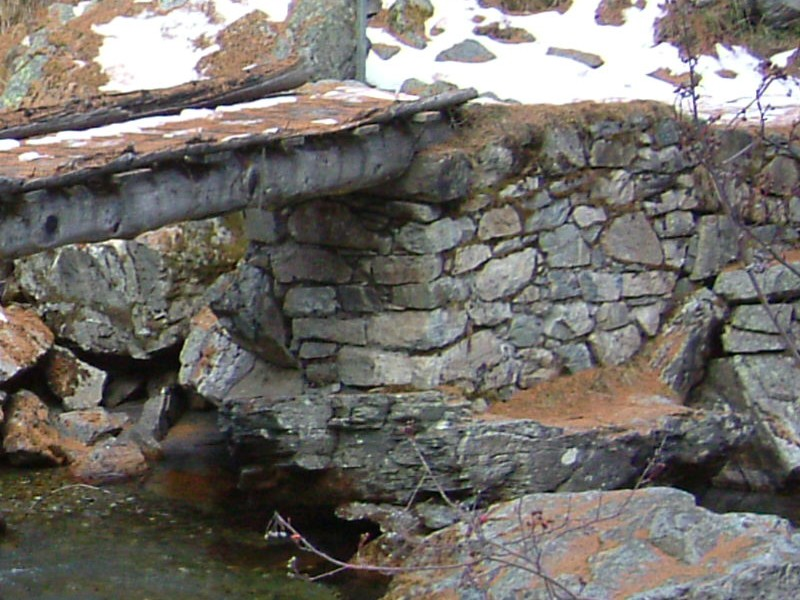
Dry set masonry supports a rustic log bridge, where it provides a well-drained support for the log (which will lengthen its service life).

The strength of a masonry wall is not entirely dependent on the bond between the building material and the mortar; the friction between the interlocking blocks of masonry is often enough to provide a great deal of strength on its own. The blocks sometimes have grooves or other surface features added to enhance this interlocking, and some dry set masonry structures forgo mortar altogether.

== Stonework ==
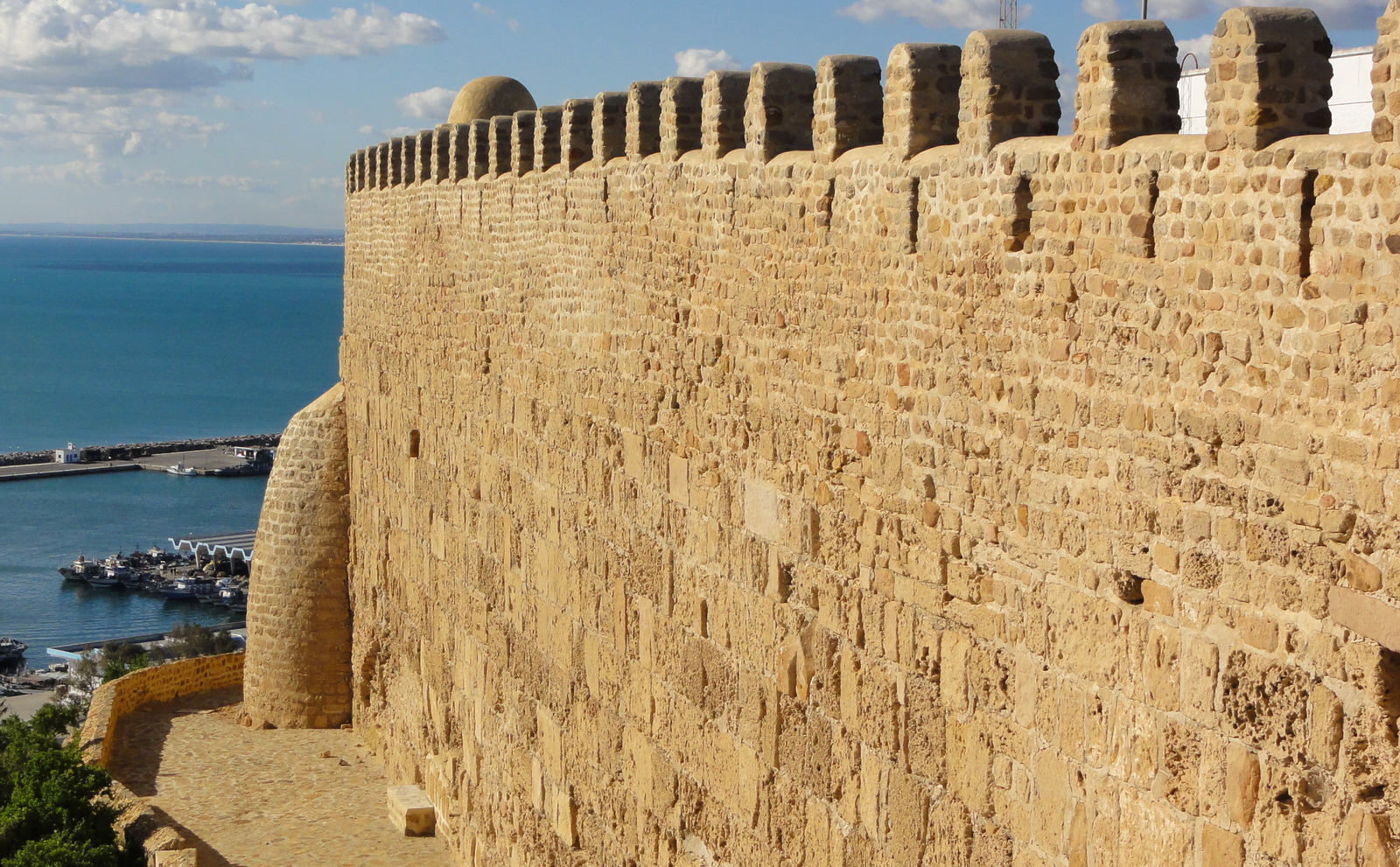
Stone masonry

Stone blocks used in masonry can be dressed or rough, though in both examples corners, door and window jambs, and similar areas are usually dressed. Stonemasonry utilizing dressed stones is known as ashlar masonry, whereas masonry using irregularly shaped stones is known as rubble masonry. Both rubble and ashlar masonry can be laid in coursed rows of even height through the careful selection or cutting of stones, but a great deal of stone masonry is uncoursed.

- Slipform stonemasonry produces a hybrid wall of reinforced concrete with a rubble stone face.
- Natural stone veneers over CMU, cast-in-place, or tilt-up concrete walls are widely used to give the appearance of stone masonry.
- Sometimes river rock of smooth oval-shaped stones is used as a veneer. This type of material is not favored for solid masonry as it requires a great amount of mortar and can lack intrinsic structural strength.
- Manufactured-stone, or cultured stone, veneers are popular alternatives to natural stones.
- Manufactured-stone veneers are typically made from concrete.
- Natural stones from quarries around the world are sampled and recreated using molds, aggregate, and colorfast pigments.
- To the casual observer there may be no visual difference between veneers of natural and manufactured stone.

== Brick ==
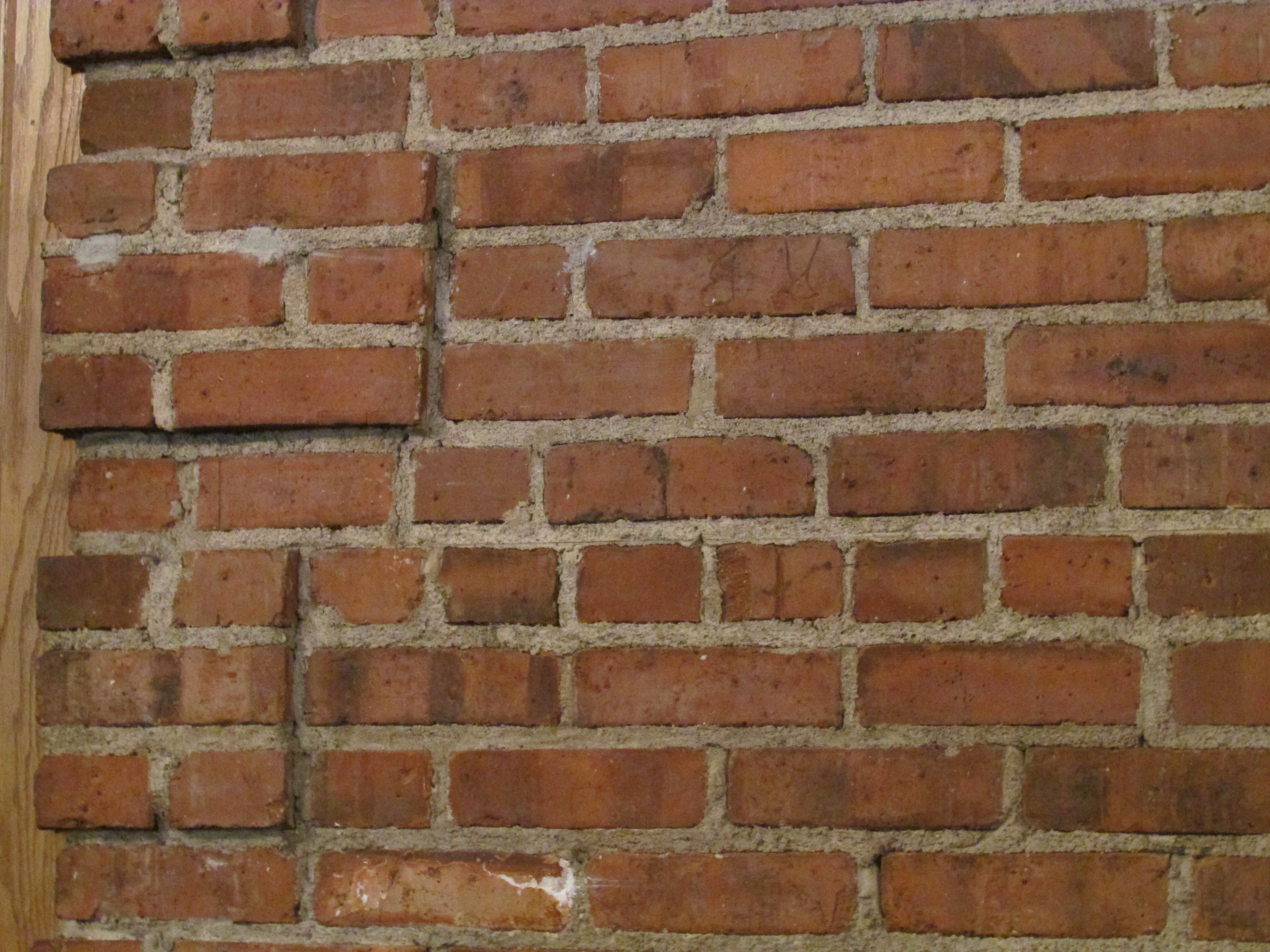
Brick work

A solid brickwork wall is made of two or more vertical layers (wythes) of bricks with those running horizontally (stretcher bricks) bound together with those running transverse to the wall (header bricks). Each row of bricks is known as a course. The pattern of headers and stretchers employed gives rise to different bonds such as the common bond (with every sixth course composed of headers), the English bond, and the Flemish bond (with alternating stretcher and header bricks present on every course). Bonds can differ in strength and in insulating ability. Vertically staggered bonds tend to be somewhat stronger and less prone to major cracking than a non-staggered bond.

=== Uniformity and rusticity ===
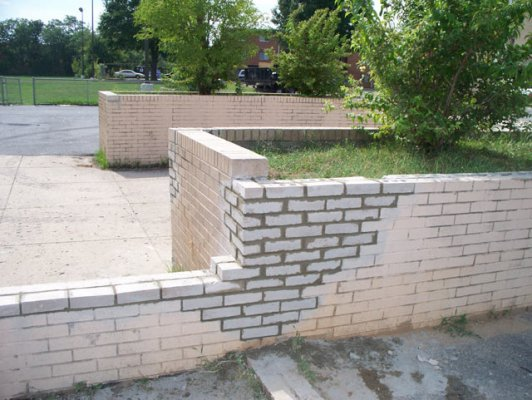
Masonry repair work done to a brick wall

The wide selection of brick styles and types generally available in industrialized nations allow much variety in the appearance of the final product. In buildings built during the 1950s–1970s, a high degree of uniformity of brick and accuracy in masonry was typical. In the period since then this style was thought to be too sterile, so attempts were made to emulate older, rougher work. Some brick surfaces are made to look particularly rustic by including burnt bricks, which have a darker color or an irregular shape. Others may use antique salvage bricks, or new bricks may be artificially aged by applying various surface treatments, such as tumbling. The attempts at rusticity of the late 20th century have been carried forward by masons specializing in a free, artistic style, where the courses are intentionally not straight, instead weaving to form more organic impressions.

=== Serpentine masonry ===
A crinkle-crankle wall is a brick wall that follows a serpentine path, rather than a straight line. This type of wall is more resistant to toppling than a straight wall; so much so that it may be made of a single wythe of unreinforced brick and so despite its longer length may be more economical than a straight wall.

== Concrete block ==
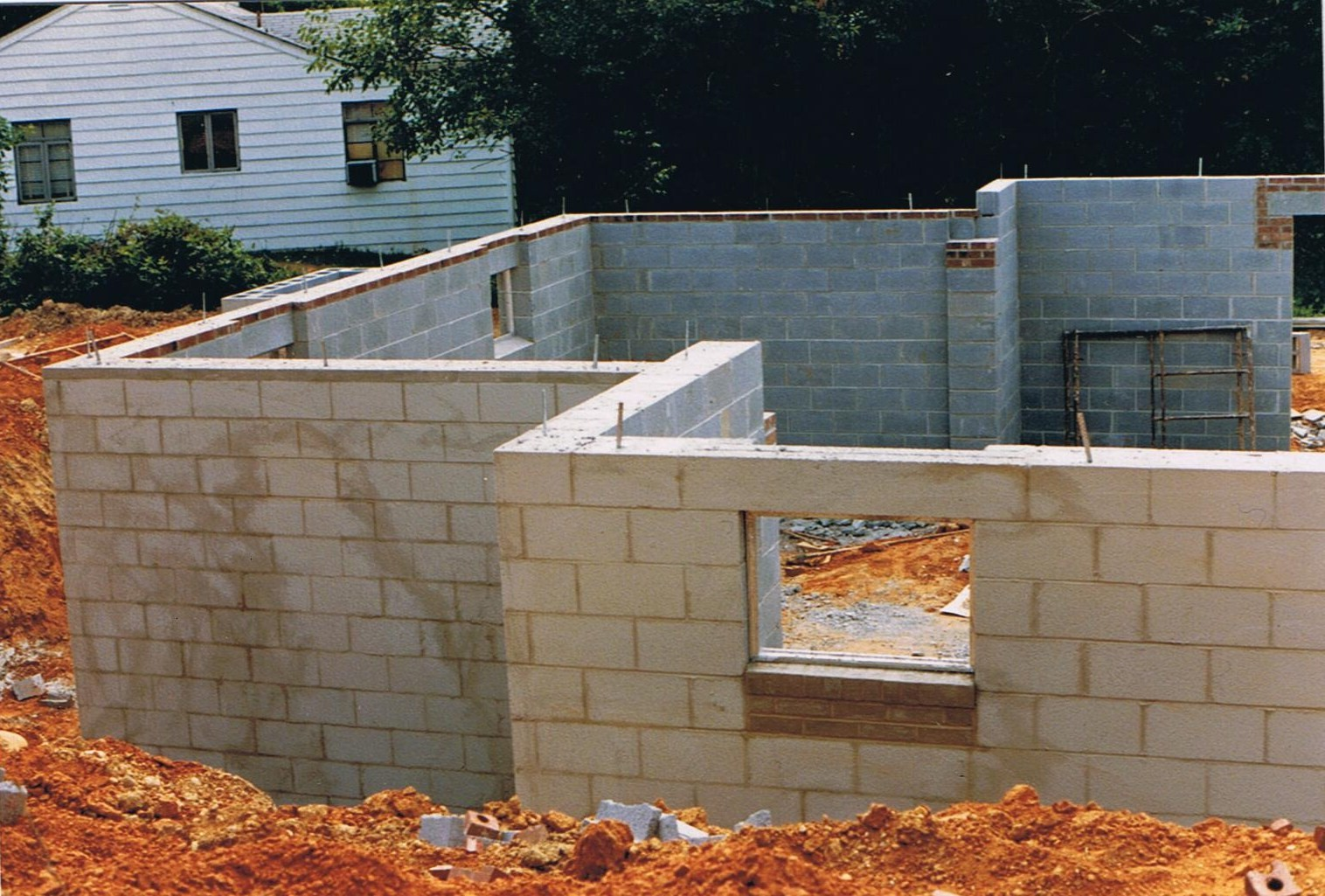
Concrete masonry units (CMUs) or blocks in a basement wall before burial

Blocks of cinder concrete (cinder blocks or breezeblocks), ordinary concrete (concrete blocks), or hollow tile are generically known as Concrete Masonry Units (CMUs). They usually are much larger than ordinary bricks and so are much faster to lay for a wall of a given size. Furthermore, cinder and concrete blocks typically have much lower water absorption rates than brick. They often are used as the structural core for veneered brick masonry or are used alone for the walls of factories, garages, and other industrial-style buildings where such appearance is acceptable or desirable. Such blocks often receive a stucco surface for decoration. Surface-bonding cement, which contains synthetic fibers for reinforcement, is sometimes used in this application and can impart extra strength to a block wall. Surface-bonding cement is often pre-colored and can be stained or painted thus resulting in a finished stucco-like surface.

The primary structural advantage of concrete blocks in comparison to smaller clay-based bricks is that a CMU wall can be reinforced by filling the block voids with concrete with or without steel rebar. Generally, certain voids are designated for filling and reinforcement, particularly at corners, wall-ends, and openings while other voids are left empty. This increases wall strength and stability more economically than filling and reinforcing all voids. Typically, structures made of CMUs will have the top course of blocks in the walls filled with concrete and tied together with steel reinforcement to form a bond beam. Bond beams are often a requirement of modern building codes and controls. Another type of steel reinforcement referred to as ladder-reinforcement can also be embedded in horizontal mortar joints of concrete block walls. The introduction of steel reinforcement generally results in a CMU wall having much greater lateral and tensile strength than unreinforced walls.

Architectural concrete masonry units (CMUs) are standard concrete masonry blocks manufactured with surface finishes — such as split-face, ground-face, or scored textures — that provide aesthetic appeal alongside structural function. CMUs can be manufactured to provide a variety of surface appearances. They can be colored during manufacturing or stained or painted after installation. They can be split as part of the manufacturing process, giving the blocks a rough face replicating the appearance of natural stone, such as brownstone. CMUs may also be scored, ribbed, sandblasted, polished, striated (raked or brushed), include decorative aggregates, be allowed to slump in a controlled fashion during curing, or include several of these techniques in their manufacture to provide a decorative appearance.

"Glazed concrete masonry units are manufactured by bonding a permanent colored facing (typically composed of polyester resins, silica sand and various other chemicals) to a concrete masonry unit, providing a smooth impervious surface."

== Glass block ==
Glass block or glass brick are blocks made from glass and provide a translucent to clear vision through the block.

== Veneer masonry ==
A masonry veneer wall consists of masonry units, usually clay-based bricks, installed on one or both sides of a structurally independent wall usually constructed of wood or masonry. In this context, the brick masonry is primarily decorative, not structural. The brick veneer is generally connected to the structural wall by brick ties (metal strips that are attached to the structural wall, as well as the mortar joints of the brick veneer). There is typically an air gap between the brick veneer and the structural wall. As clay-based brick is usually not completely waterproof, the structural wall will often have a water-resistant surface (usually tar paper) and weep holes can be left at the base of the brick veneer to drain moisture that accumulates inside the air gap. Concrete blocks, real and cultured stones, and veneer adobe are sometimes used in a very similar veneer fashion.

Most insulated buildings that use concrete block, brick, adobe, stone, veneers or some combination thereof feature interior insulation in the form of fiberglass batts between wooden wall studs or in the form of rigid insulation boards covered with plaster or drywall. In most climates this insulation is much more effective on the exterior of the wall, allowing the building interior to take advantage of the aforementioned thermal mass of the masonry. This technique does, however, require some sort of weather-resistant exterior surface over the insulation and, consequently, is generally more expensive.

== Gabions ==
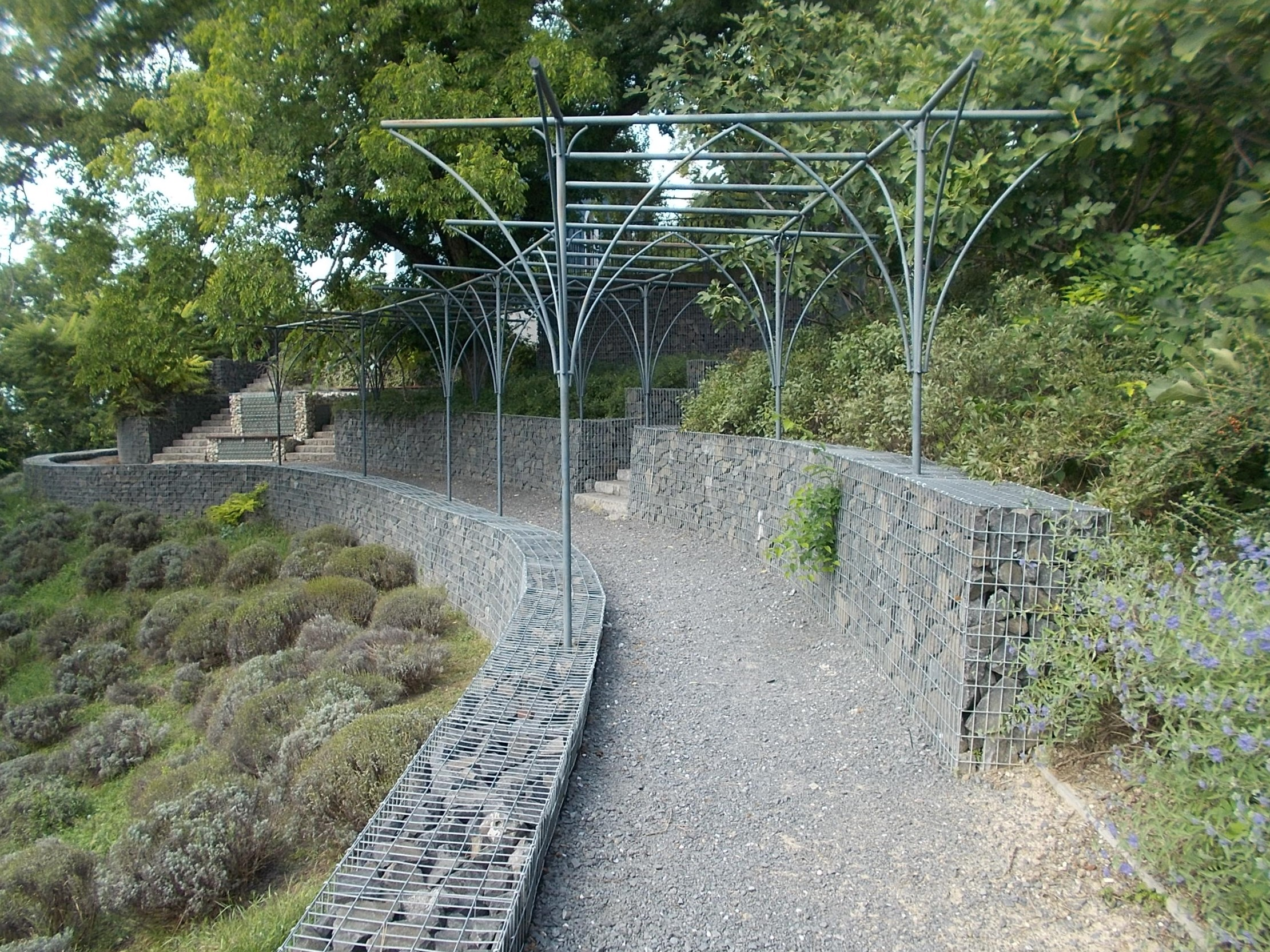
Gabion Wall

Gabions are baskets, usually now of zinc-protected steel (galvanized steel) that are filled with fractured stone of medium size. These will act as a single unit and are stacked with setbacks to form a revetment or retaining wall. They have the advantage of being well drained, flexible, and resistant to flood, water flow from above, frost damage, and soil flow. Their expected useful life is only as long as the wire they are composed of and if used in severe climates (such as shore-side in a salt water environment) must be made of appropriate corrosion-resistant wire. Most modern gabions are rectangular. Earlier gabions were often cylindrical wicker baskets, open at both ends, used usually for temporary, often military, construction.

Similar work can be done with finer aggregates using cellular confinement.

== Passive fire protection (PFP) ==
Masonry walls have an endothermic effect of its hydrates, as in chemically bound water, unbound moisture from the concrete block, and the poured concrete if the hollow cores inside the blocks are filled. Masonry can withstand temperatures up to 1,000 °F (538 °C) and it can withstand direct exposure to fire for up to 4 hours. In addition to that, concrete masonry keeps fires contained to their room of origin 93% of the time. For those reasons, concrete and masonry units hold the highest flame spread index classification, Class A.

Fire cuts can be used to increase safety and reduce fire damage to masonry buildings.

== Mechanical modeling of masonry structures ==
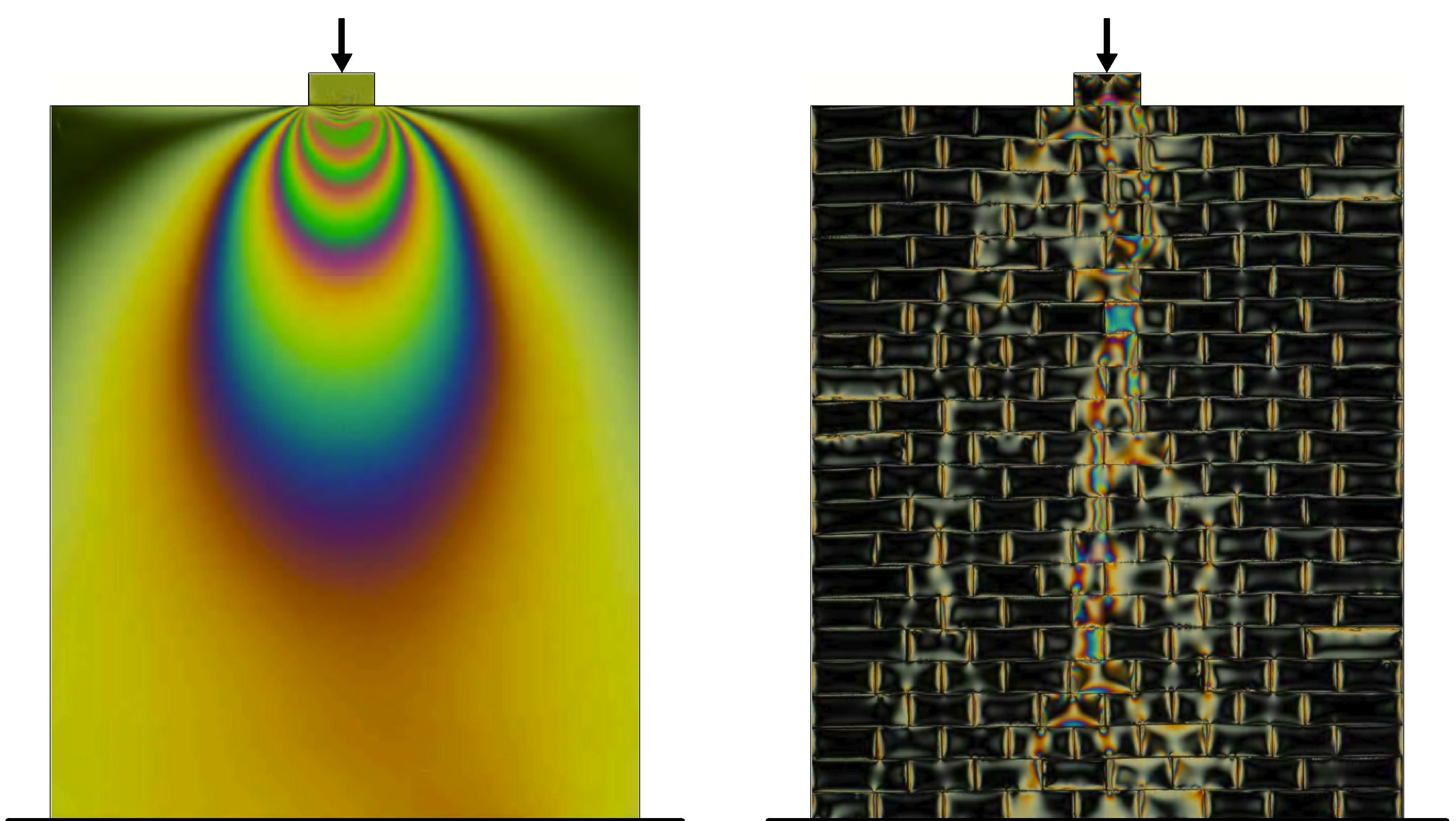
A comparison (using transmission photoelasticity) between the stress diffusion in an elastic body (on the left) and a model of masonry (on the right). A highly localized stress percolation is visible on the right.

From the point of view of material modeling, masonry is a special material of extreme mechanical properties (with a very high ratio between strength in compression and in tension), so that the applied loads do not diffuse as they do in elastic bodies, but tend to percolate along lines of high stiffness.

== See also ==
- Castle – Fortified structure
- Clay panel – Building material made of clay with some additives
- Concrete finisher – Tradesperson
- CEN/TC 125 – European Union technical committee
- Defensive wall – Fortification used to protect an area from potential aggressors
- Dry-stone wall – Construction method
- Fire protection – Measures that prevent or mitigate unwanted fire
- Galleting – Architectural technique
- List of decorative stones
- NIST stone test wall
