= Beranuy =

Beranuy Beranui (in Catalan)
- Municipality
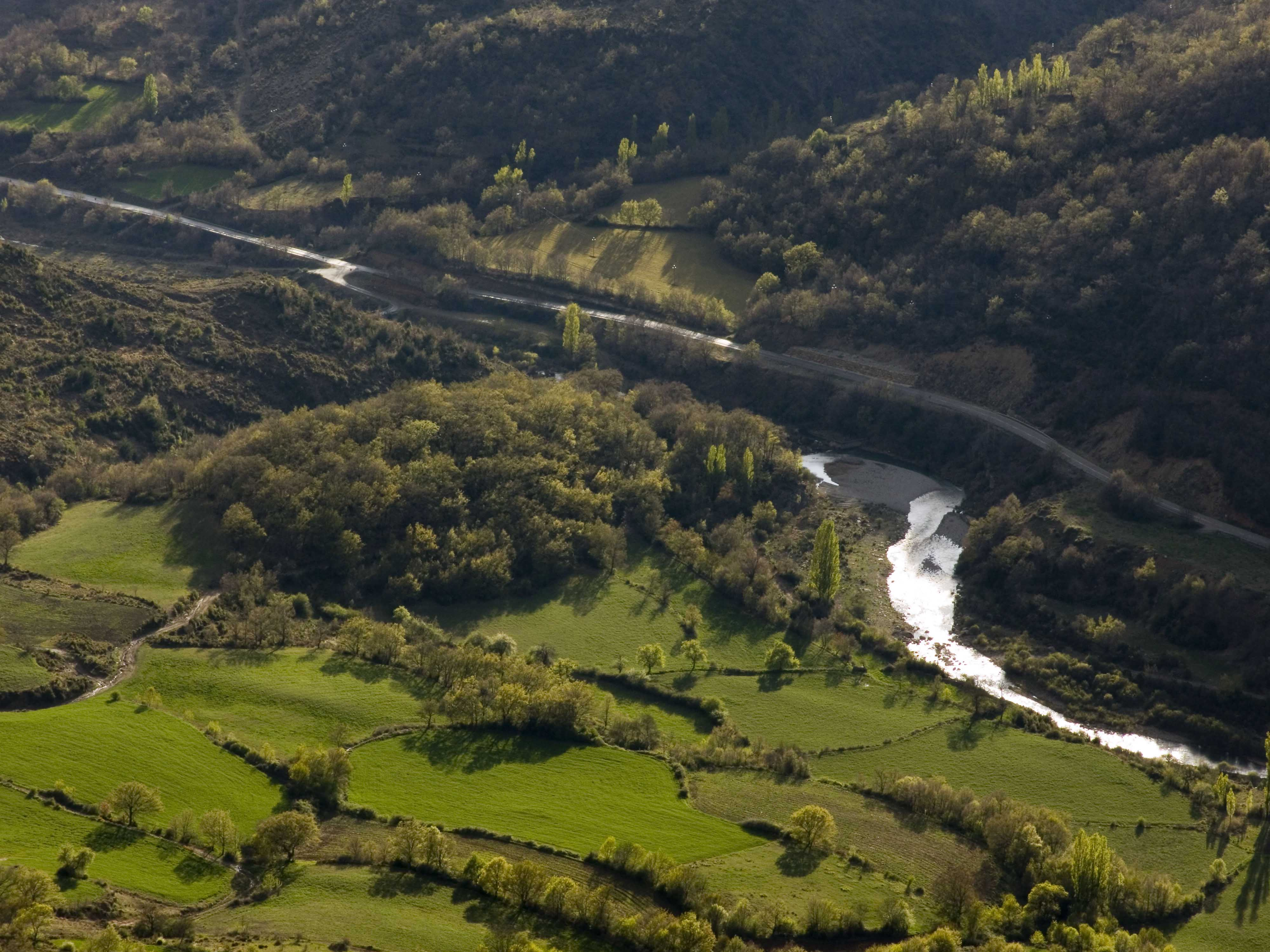
- Isábena Valley of Beranui

- Location of Beranuy within Aragon Location of Beranuy within Spain
- Coordinates: 42°22′51″N 0°36′07″E
- Country: Spain
- Autonomous community: Aragon
- Province: Huesca
- Comarca: Ribagorza

Area
  - Total: 63.75 km^{2} (24.61 sq mi)
- Elevation: 1,160 m (3,810 ft)

Population (2025-01-01)
  - Total: 68
  - Density: 1.1/km^{2} (2.8/sq mi)
- Time zone: UTC+1 (CET)
  - Summer (DST): UTC+2 (CEST)
- Postal code: 22485
- Official language(s): Spanish, Catalan

Beranuy, in Catalan and Aragonese: Beranui (locally [beɾaˈnuj]) is a municipality located in the Ribagorza (comarca) comarca, province of Huesca, Aragon, Spain. According to the 2010 census (INE), the municipality has a population of 104 inhabitants.

The municipality was created in 1966 with the union of municipalities of Beranui and Calvera, in a concentration process in the State.

Since 2011 the official name of the municipality is Beranuy (Catalan: [beɾaˈnuj]), which is an adaptation of Catalan name (Beranui) (Catalan: [beɾaˈnuj]) in Spanish. In 1966 the municipality received the name of "Veracruz" (Spanish: [beɾaˈkɾuθ]). The paronym Veracruz (Spanish: [beɾaˈkɾuθ]) is a Hispanicization too of the traditional name Beranui, that disregarded the natural linguistic correspondence.

The 9th - 11th century monastery of Santa María de Obarra is located within the municipal term at the foot of the Mountains of Sis.

== Villages ==
The following villages within the municipal term of Beranuy

- Ballabriga
- Biascas de Obarra
- Calbera
- Les Ferreries de Calvera
- Morens
- Santa María de Obarra
- Pardinella

=== Uninhabited villages ===
- Formons
- Ralui

== Gallery ==
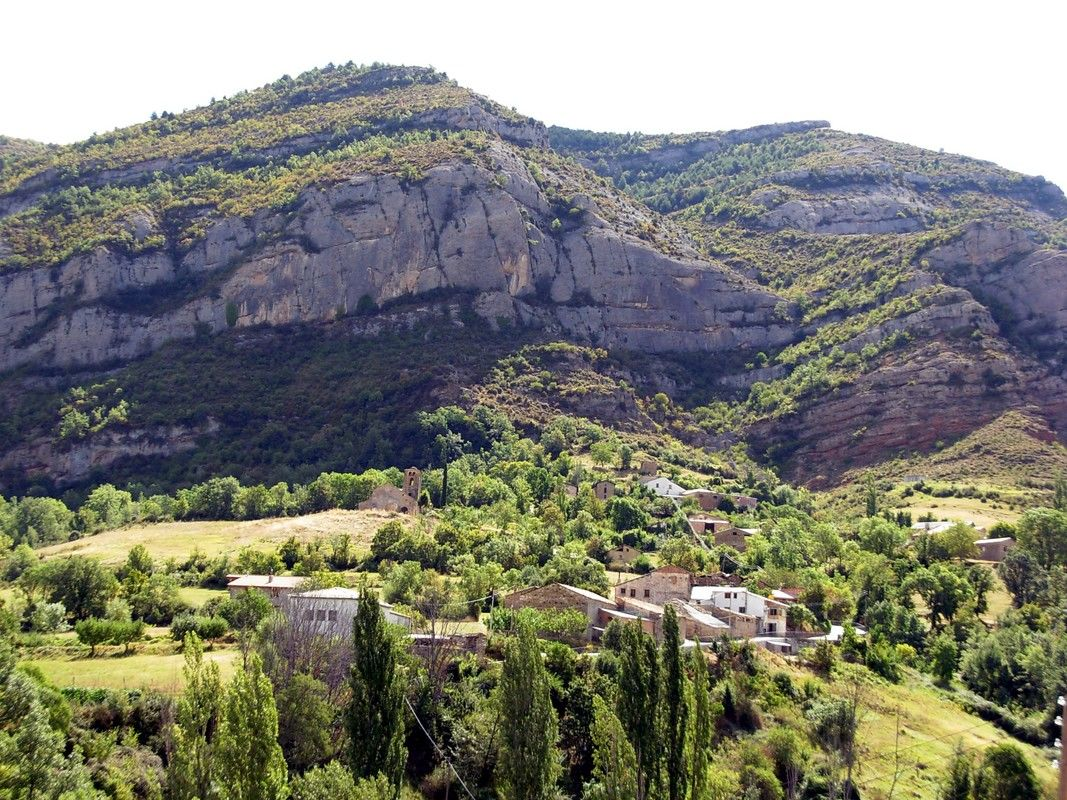
View of Beranui

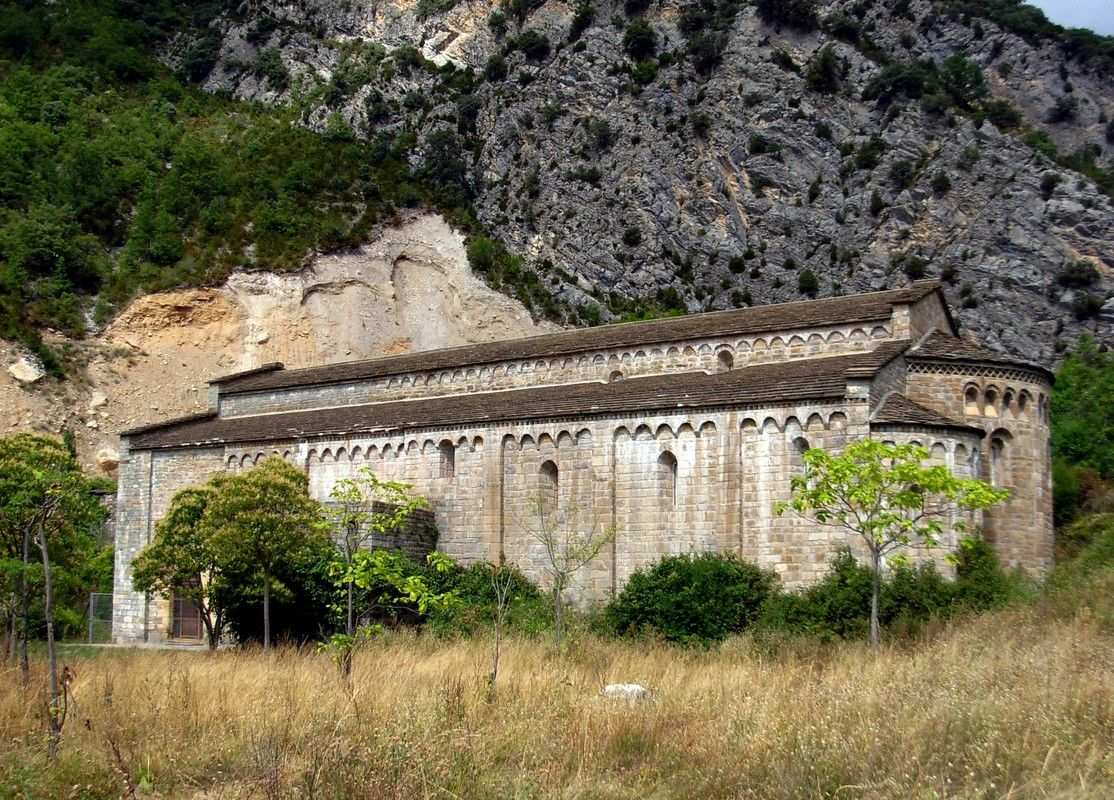
View of the Santa María de Obarra Monastery

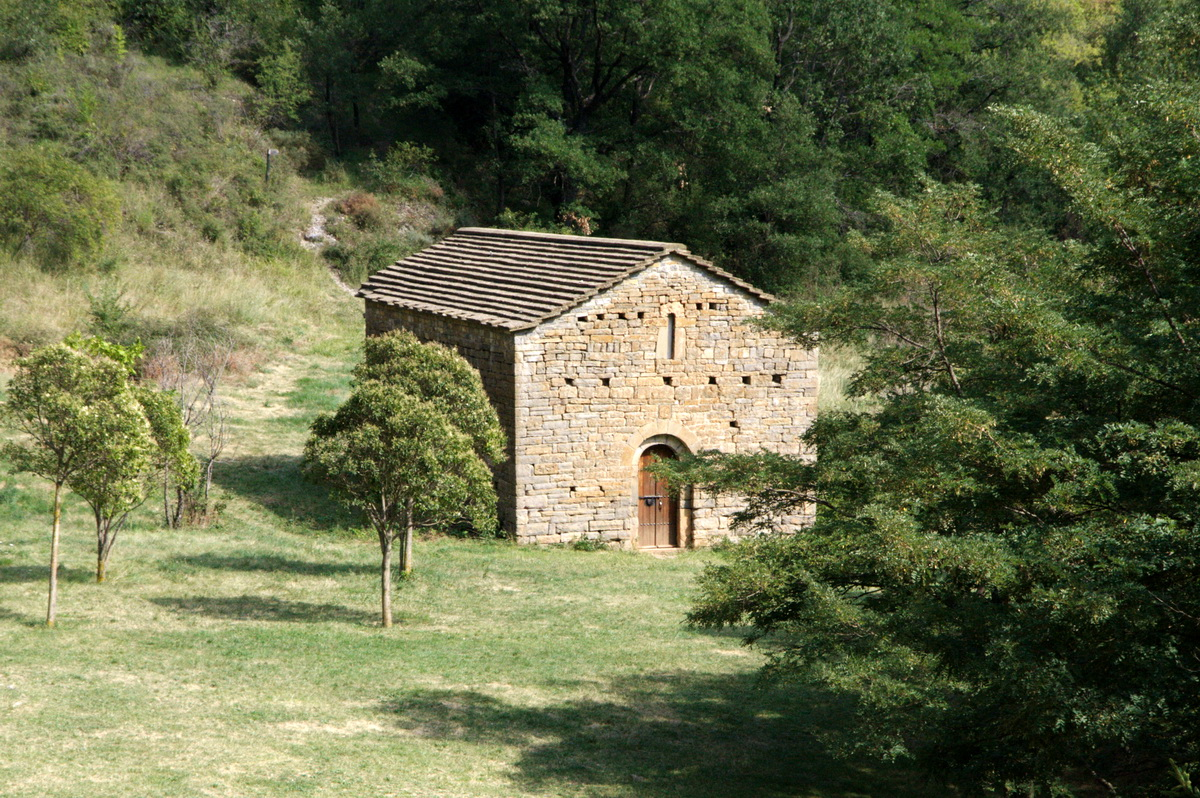
View of Saint Paul church near Obarra Monastery

== See also ==
- Isábena River
- El Turbón
- List of municipalities in Huesca
