= Ribagorça (disambiguation) =

Ribagorça or Ribagorza may refer to:

- Ribagorça or Ribagorza, a historical and natural region of Aragon and Catalonia
- County of Ribagorza or Ribagorça, a medieval county in Spain
- Ribagorza (comarca) or Ribagorça, a territorial unit in modern Aragon, Spain
- Alta Ribagorça, a territorial unit in modern Catalonia, Spain
