= Benasque and Ballabriga rolls =

Start of the Ballabriga roll

The Benasque and Ballabriga rolls are two sets of legal charters from 11th-century Spain. They formed the private archive of a laywoman named Sancha from the County of Ribagorza. The parchment documents were sewn together to form two rotuli (rolls), wound around a wooden spindle. There are 70 charters in the Benasque roll and 27 in the Ballabriga. The rolls concern properties in the Benasque and Ballabriga valleys acquired by Sancha and her two husbands, Enardo (m. 1006–1019) and Apo Galindo (m. 1020–1045). When the properties were acquired by the monastery of Santa María de Obarra later in the century, the monks preserved the rolls rather than copying the contents into their cartulary. They are now kept in Madrid and Zaragoza, respectively.

The survival of a private archive from this place and time is extremely rare. The documents, written in Latin by local priests, contain many linguistic particularisms. They are also contain perhaps "the last traces of a structuring of society once more general throughout the Pyrenees". Most of the actors in the charters are male, but they are often identified by matronymic. Moreover, women engage in transactions without reference to male relatives at a much higher rate than is visible in comparable evidence from elsewhere in Spain.

== Bibliography ==
- Collins, Roger (2012). Caliphs and Kings: Spain, 796–1031. London: Wiley Blackwell. ISBN 978-1-118-73001-0.
- Mateu Ibars, Josefina; Mateu Ibars, María Dolores (1980). Colectánea paleográfica de la Corona de Aragón: Siglos IX–XVIII. Universitat Barcelona. ISBN 978-84-7528-694-5.
- Martín Duque, Ángel J. [in Spanish], ed. (1965). Colección diplomática de Obarra, siglos XI–XIII. Consejo Superior de Investigaciones Científicas, Instituto de Estudios Pirenaicos.
- Martín Duque, Ángel J. (2002). "El monasterio de Obarra en los siglos XI a XIII" (PDF). Príncipe de Viana. 63 (227): 583–598.
