= Morens =

Morens can refer to:

- Morens, Fribourg, Switzerland, former municipality
- Morens, Huesca, Spain, unpopulated locality
- David Morens (born 1947), American medical scientist

== See also ==
- Moren
