= Calbera =

- Locality
- Calvera
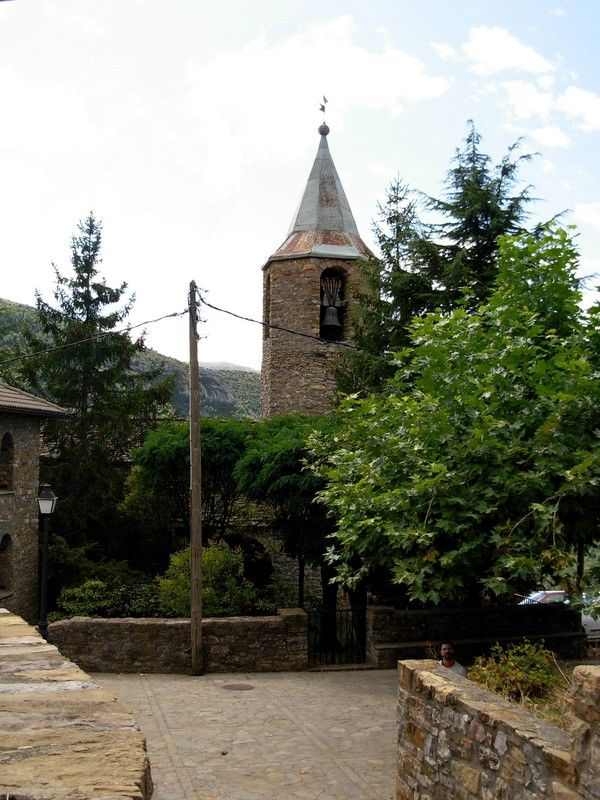

- Location within Aragon Location within Spain
- Coordinates: 42°23′16″N 0°36′48″E
- Country: Spain
- Autonomous community: Aragon
- Province: Province of Huesca
- Municipality: Beranuy
- Elevation: 1,212 m (3,976 ft)

Population
  - Total: 16

Calbera or Calvera is a locality located in the municipality of Beranuy, in Huesca province, Aragon, Spain. As of 2020, it has a population of 16.

== Geography ==
Calbera is located 128km east-northeast of Huesca.
