= Les Ferreries de Calvera =

- Locality
- Las Herrerías
- Location within Aragon Location within Spain
- Coordinates: 42°22′44″N 0°35′54″E
- Country: Spain
- Autonomous community: Aragon
- Province: Province of Huesca
- Municipality: Beranuy
- Elevation: 963 m (3,159 ft)

Population
  - Total: 11

Les Ferreries de Calvera or Las Herrerías is a locality located in the municipality of Beranuy, in Huesca province, Aragon, Spain. As of 2020, it has a population of 11.

== Geography ==
Les Ferreries de Calvera is located 125km east-northeast of Huesca.
