= Mountains of Sis =

Mountain in Spain

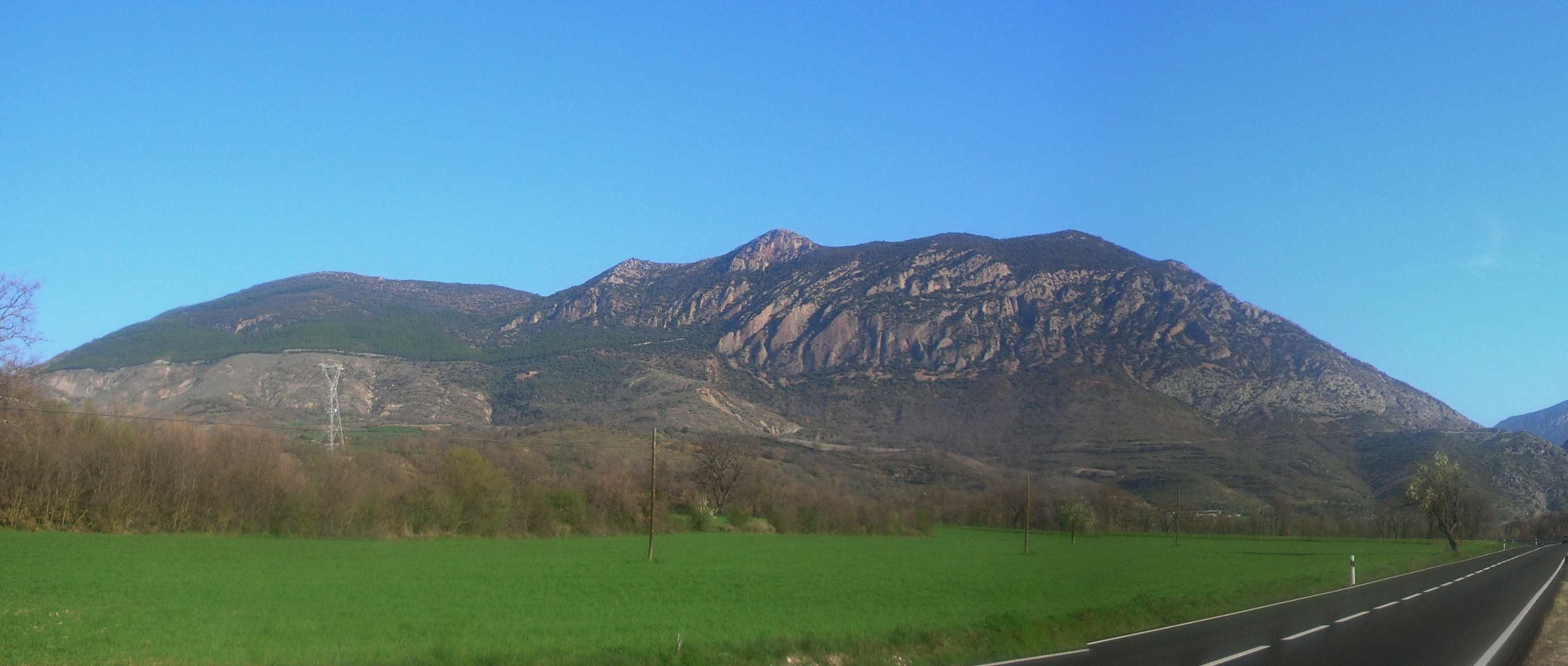
- The Mountains of Sis seen from the south

Highest point
- Elevation: 1,791 m (5,876 ft)
- Listing: List of mountains in Aragon
- Coordinates: 42°24′41″N 00°38′39″E

Geography
- Location within Pyrenees
- Location: Ribagorza (Aragon)
- Parent range: Pre-Pyrenees

Geology
- Mountain type: Conglomerate

Climbing
- Easiest route: Drive from Beranui, Sopeira or Arén

The Mountains of Sis (Catalan: Serra de Sis, or Serra del Cis; Spanish: Sierra de Sis) is a 28 km (17 mi) long mountain range of the Pre-Pyrenees. They are located between the valleys of rivers Isábena and the Escales Reservoir, Noguera Ribagorzana, in the Ribagorza comarca, Aragon, Spain. The ridge's highest summits are Pico de l'Amorriador (1791 m) and Puialto (1782 m). Other important summits are 1765 m high La Creu de Bonansa, 1490 m high Altaió d'Aulet and 1066 m high Tossal de Cornudella.

== Geography ==
This mountain chain rises abruptly from a plain and looks quite impressive from certain angles, therefore in ancient geographic works this range was also referred to as "the Great Mountains of Sis" (Spanish: la gran sierra de Sis) owing to the massive appearance of its mountains, abruptly rising as mighty foothills of the Pyrenees.

The summits of this mountain chain offer an excellent lookout point to have a view of some of the main peaks of the Pyrenees from the south, as well as of the magnificent El Turbón in the west. Some of the steep rocky cliffs of the range are popular with rock climbers.

The 9th - 11th century Santa María de Obarra monastery is located at the foot of the western end of the Sierra de Sis range. There are also abandoned villages and church buildings, as well as many ancient cattle farmers' buildings known as borda in the area.

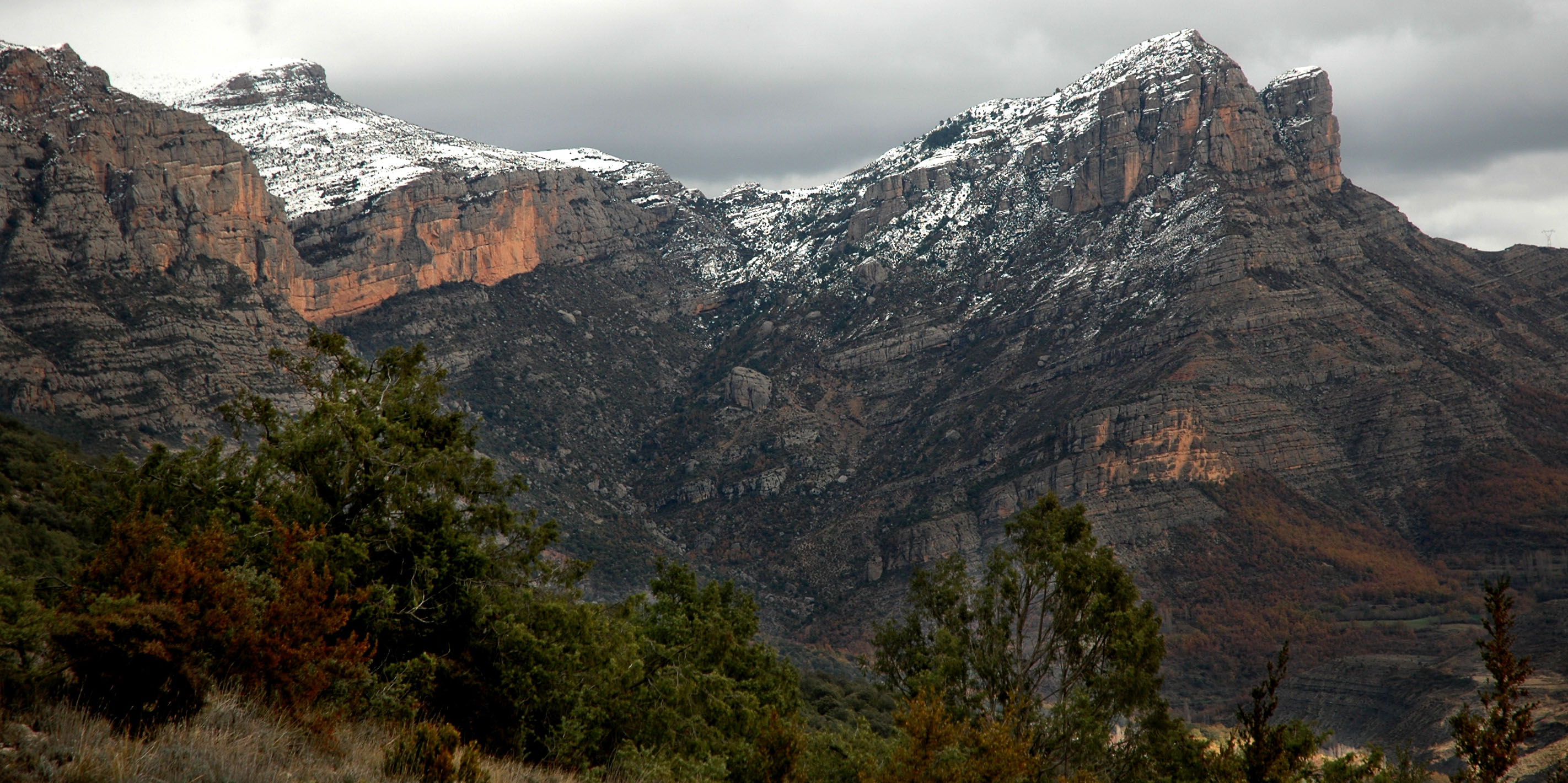
Some of the mighty cliffs of the range

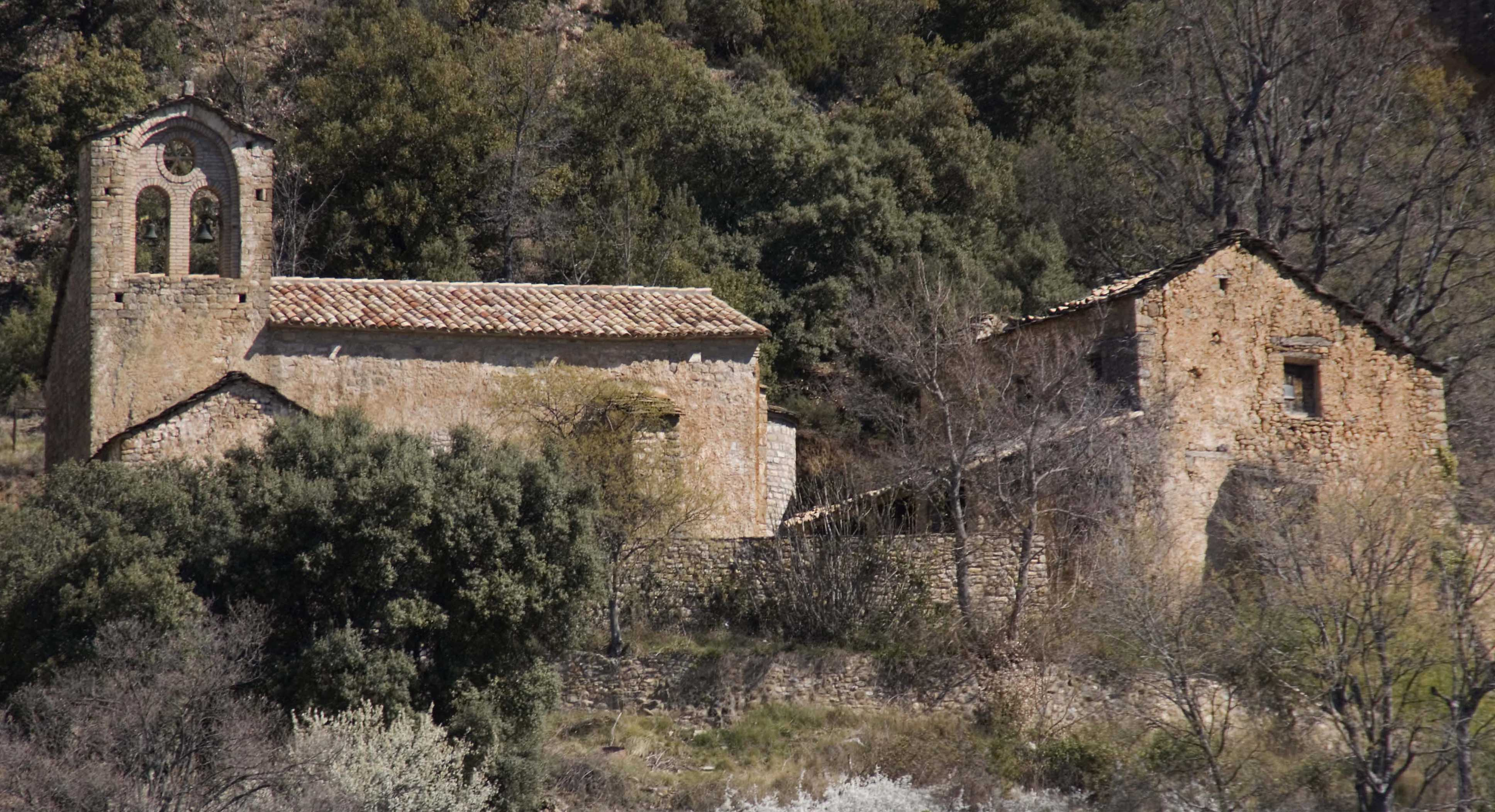
Ermita de la Feixa

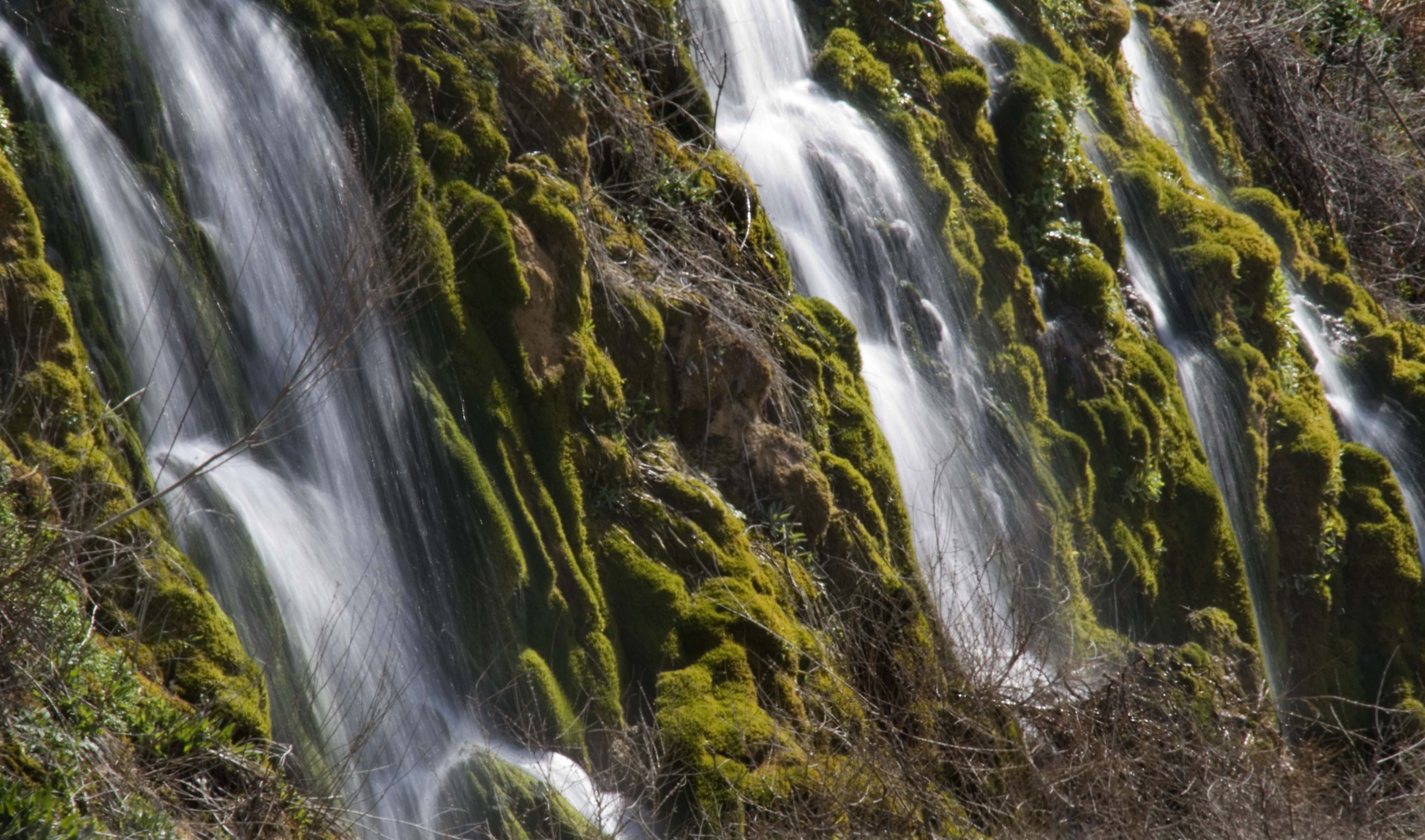
View of the Font de Sant Cristòfol waterfalls

== See also ==
- Santa María de Obarra
- List of mountains in Aragon
- Ribagorça
