= Pardinella =

- Locality
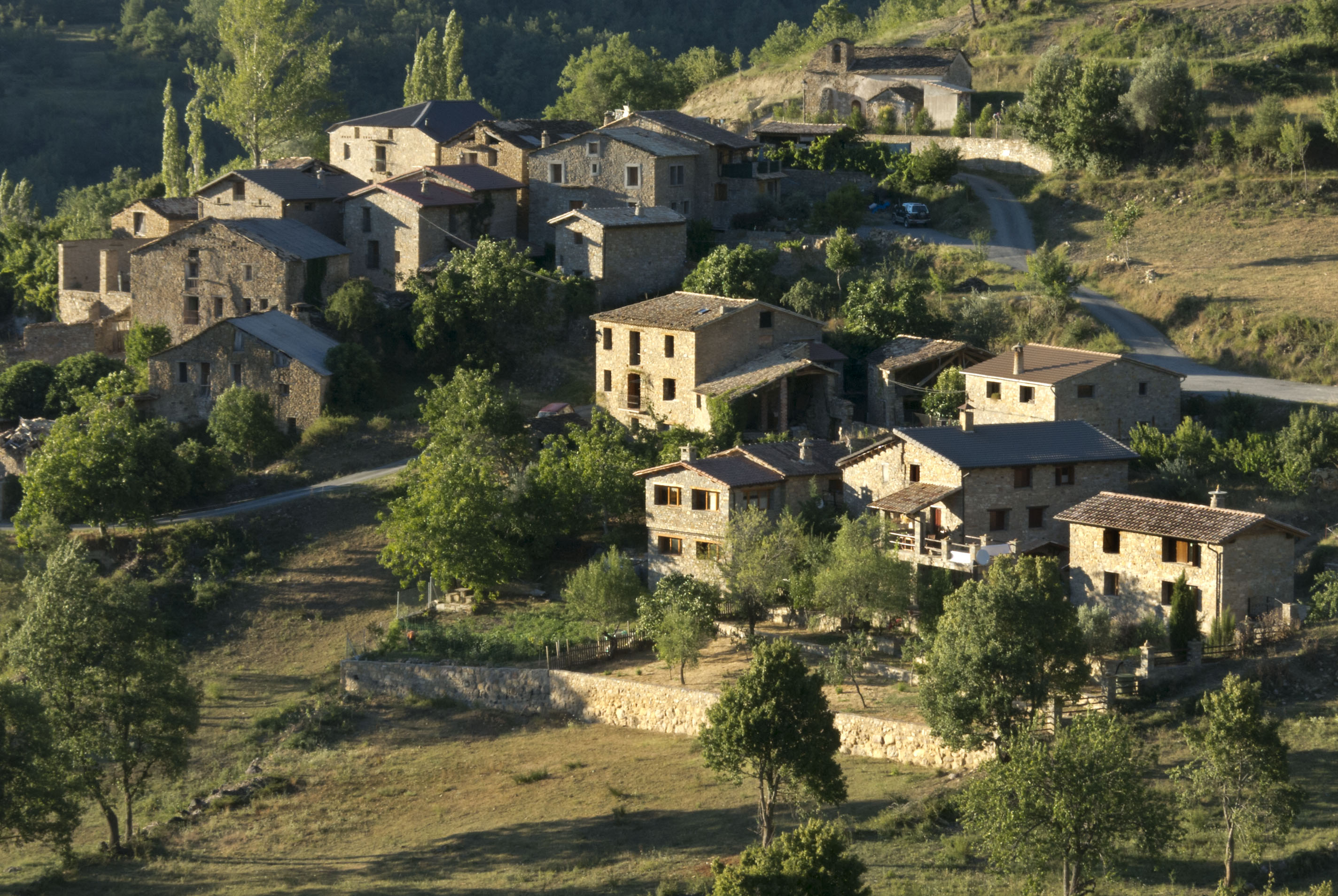

- Location within Aragon Location within Spain
- Coordinates: 42°21′14″N 0°34′42″E
- Country: Spain
- Autonomous community: Aragon
- Province: Province of Huesca
- Municipality: Beranuy
- Elevation: 971 m (3,186 ft)

Population
  - Total: 15

Pardinella is a locality located in the municipality of Beranuy, in Huesca province, Aragon, Spain. As of 2020, it has a population of 15.

== Geography ==
Pardinella is located 123km east-northeast of Huesca.
