= Ballabriga =

- Locality
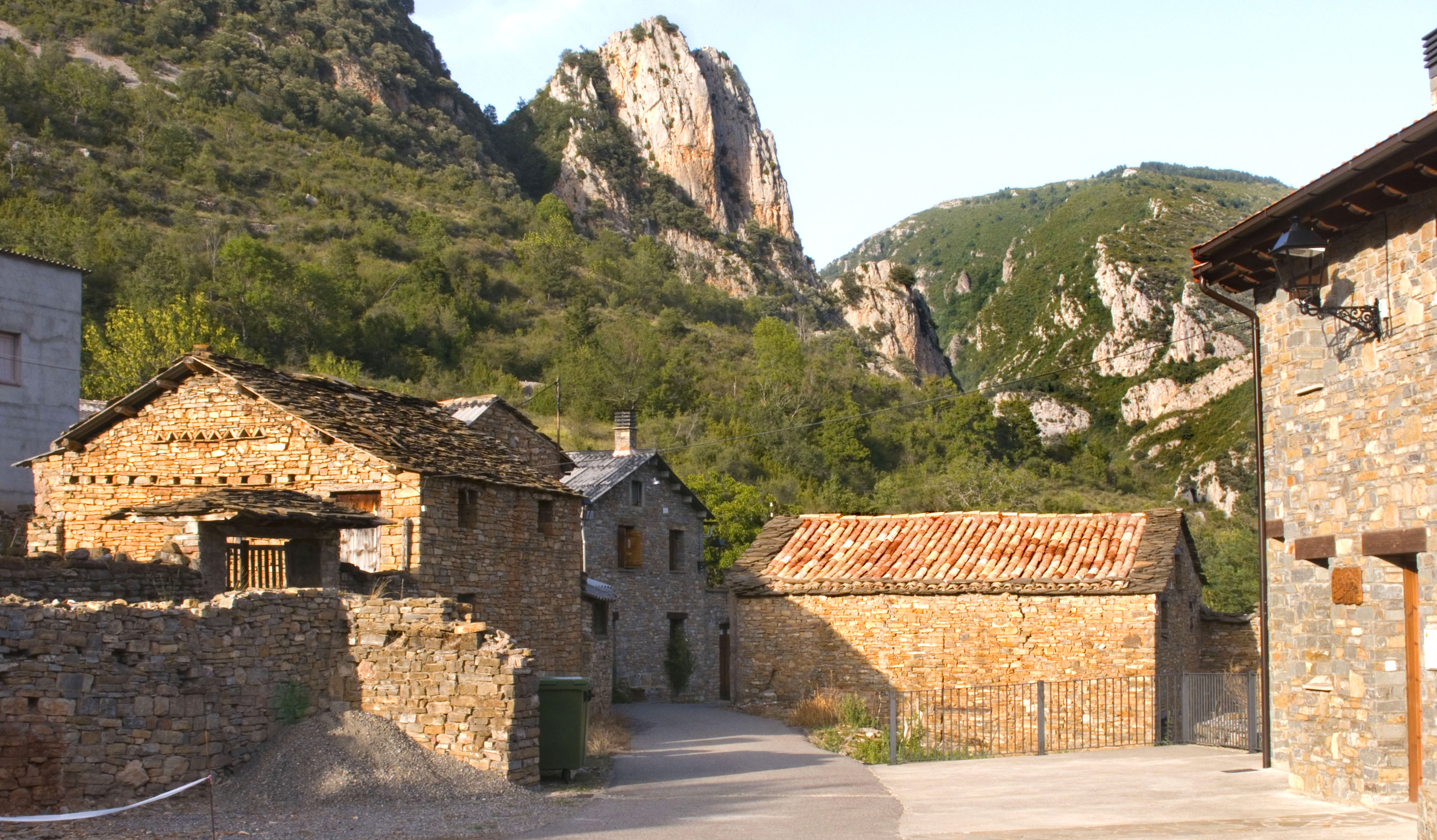

- Location within Aragon Location within Spain
- Coordinates: 42°23′54″N 0°35′13″E
- Country: Spain
- Autonomous community: Aragon
- Province: Province of Huesca
- Municipality: Beranuy
- Elevation: 1,181 m (3,875 ft)

Population
  - Total: 4

Ballabriga is a locality located in the municipality of Beranuy, in Huesca province, Aragon, Spain. As of 2020, it has a population of 4.

== See also ==
- Benasque and Ballabriga rolls
