= Ribagorça =

Ribagorça Ribagorza / Rives Gorces
- Natural region
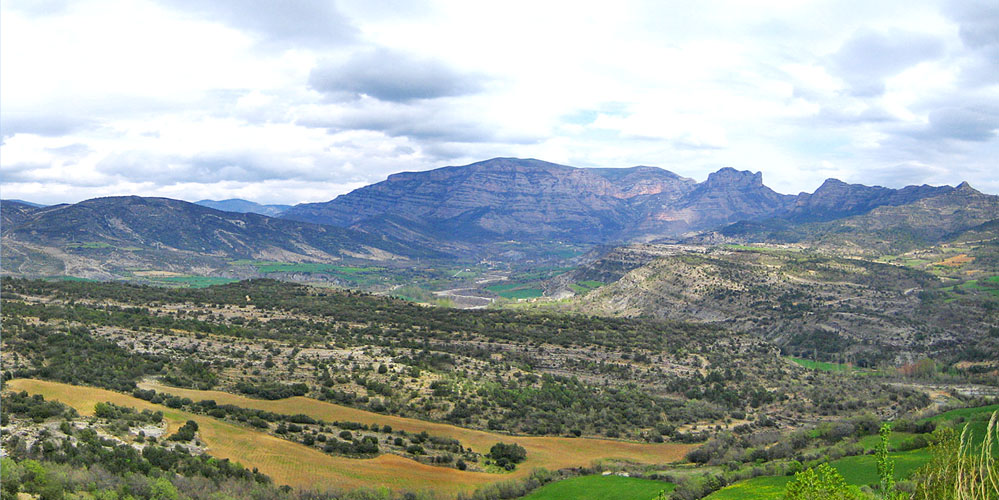
- Landscape of the region at the Isábena Valley.

- Location within Spain
- Coordinates: 42.1875°N 0.334167°E
- Country: Spain
- Elevation: 780 m (2,560 ft)

Ribagorça (Western Catalan: [riβaˈɣɔɾsa]) or Ribagorza (Spanish: [riβaˈɣoɾθa], Aragonese: [ɾiβaˈɣoɾθa]; French: Rives Gorces) is a historical and natural region of Aragon and Catalonia. Located in the Pre-Pyrenees and Pyrenees area, most of its territory is mountainous. The region has been steadily losing population since mid 20th century.

The Noguera Ribagorçana river is named after this region.

== Geography ==
The region is located south of the French border with the Pallars in the east and the Sobrarbe in the west. The physiography of the Ribagorça natural region includes the Ésera, Isábena and Noguera Ribagorçana river basins with their tributaries. The region also encompasses the mountain ranges spanning the Pyrenees and Pre-Pyrenees area that surrounds the basins of these south-flowing rivers.

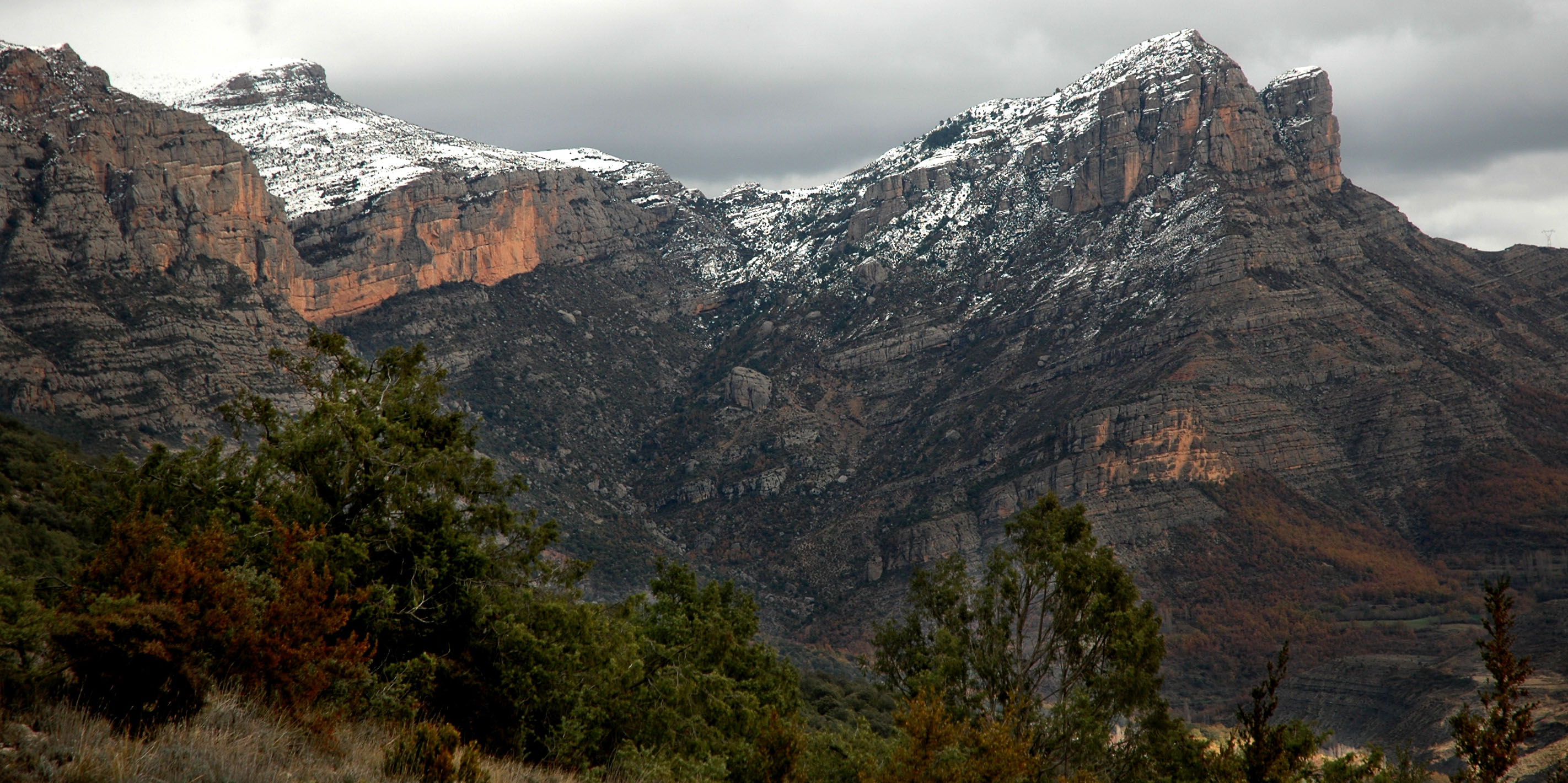
The Mountains of Sis, one of the mighty ranges of Ribagorça.

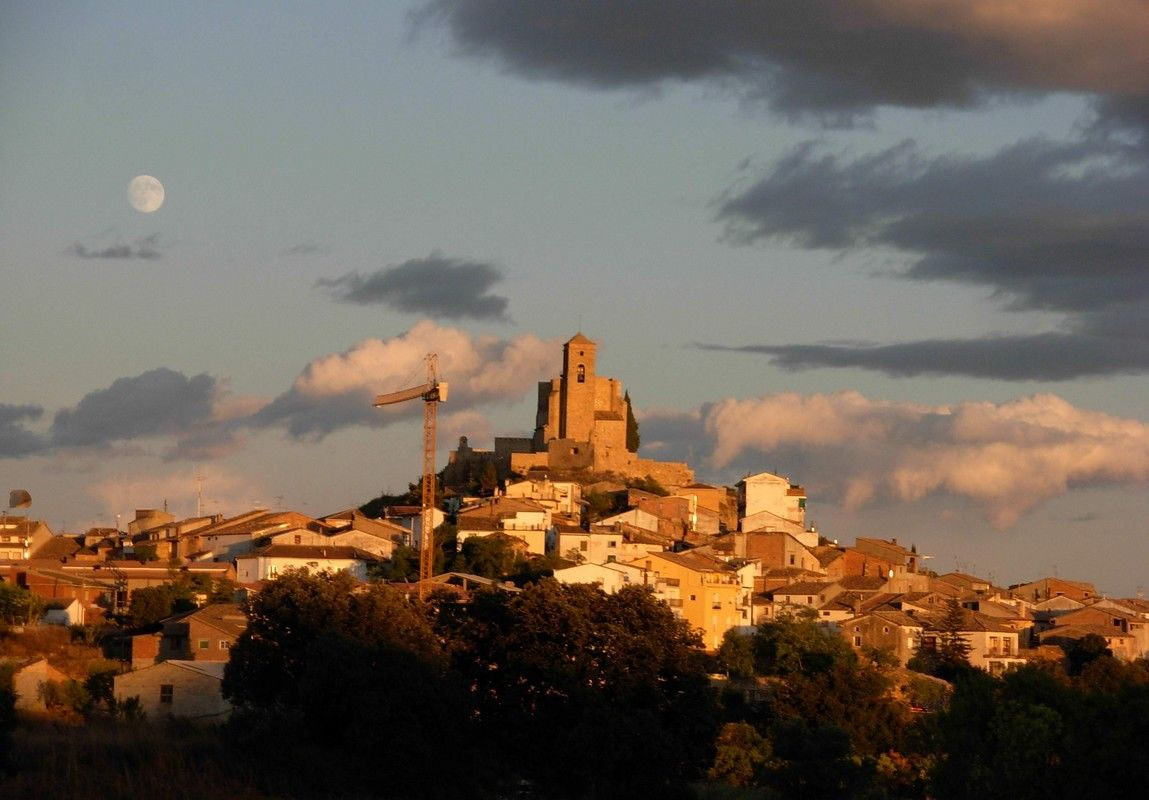
View of Benabarre (Benavarri), the former capital of the region.

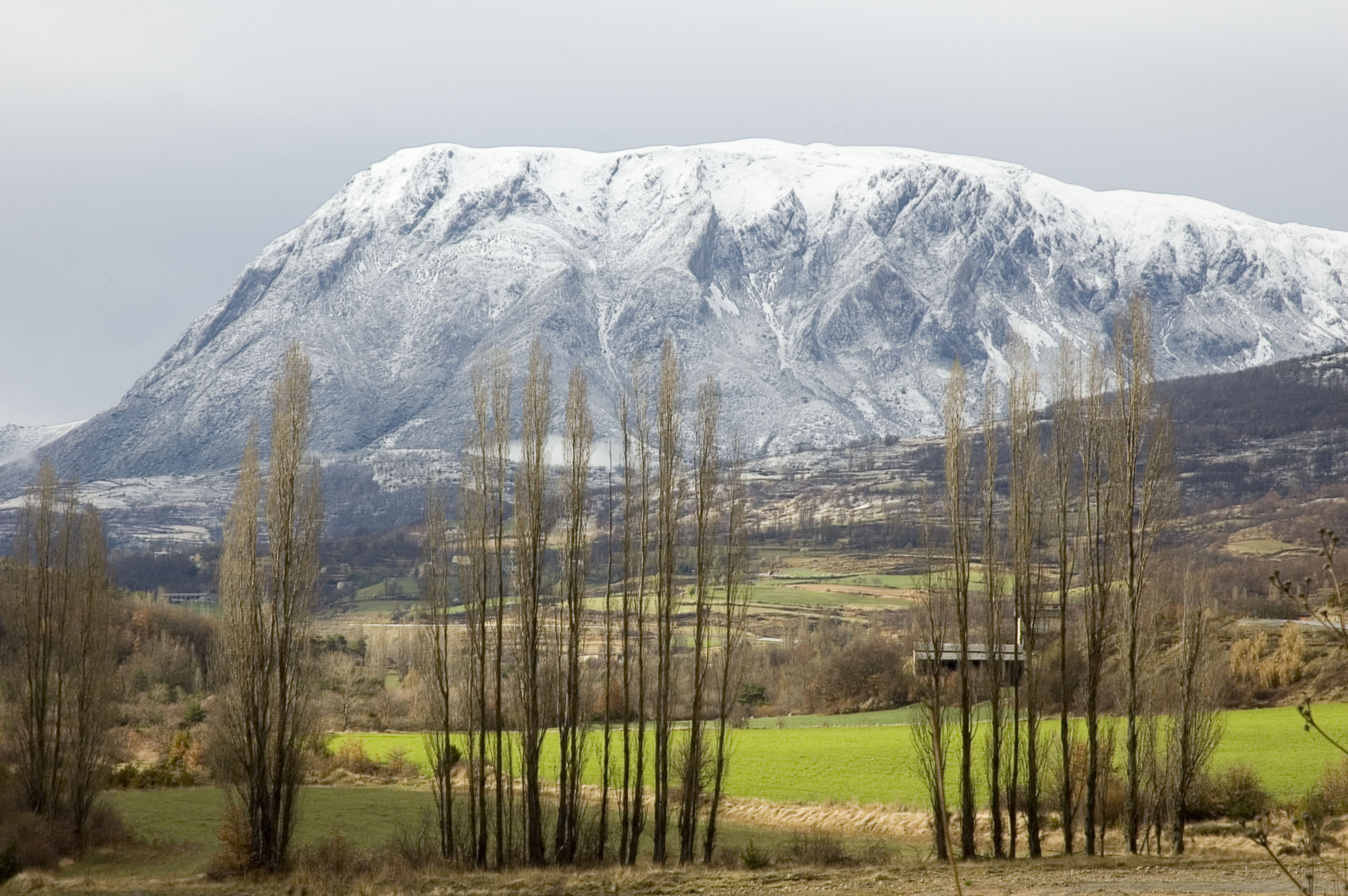
El Turbón

=== Municipalities ===
The traditional capital of the region was Benabarre (Catalan: Benavarri); according to the 2014 census, the municipality has a population of 1,153 inhabitants. In present times, however, the most important town of the Ribagorça is Graus with a population of 3,429 in 2014.

=== Present-day administrative divisions ===
==== Ribagorza/Ribagorça ====
Ribagorza/Ribagorça is a comarca of Aragon established in 2002. It forms the northeastern part of Huesca Province. It borders the French département of the Haute-Garonne to the north, the Aran Valley, Alta Ribagorça, Pallars Jussà, and Noguera to the east, Sobrarbe to the west, as well as Somontano de Barbastro and La Litera/La Llitera to the south. The territory of the modern Aragonese comarca was traditionally known as Baixa Ribagorça in Catalan.

==== Alta Ribagorça ====
Present-day Alta Ribagorça is one of the comarques of Catalonia. Its capital is Pont de Suert. Other municipalities are Vall de Boí and Vilaller.

== History ==
The County of Ribagorça was a historic county with its own dynasty between 872 and 1017. It became a county of the Kingdom of Aragon from 1018 to 1322, year in which it was joined to Aragon as an appanage or estate. Ribagorça became part of the Spanish Crown in 1591 under Philip II.

== Linguistics ==
Ribagorçan (ribagorzano, ribagorsano) is a transitional Aragonese and Catalan dialect spoken in the area of Aragon and Catalan Ribagorçan (ribagorçà) is a Catalan dialect spoken in the Alta Ribagorça, Catalonia. Speakers of Pont de Suert use a Catalan variant transitional to Aragonese with some traits of Aranese Occitan. However, Aragonese and Catalan form a dialectal continuum in the region and it is not possible to draw the geographical limit of both languages in a clear-cut manner.

== See also ==
- Comarcas of Aragon
- Comarques of Catalonia
- Pallars
