= Biascas de Obarra =

- Locality
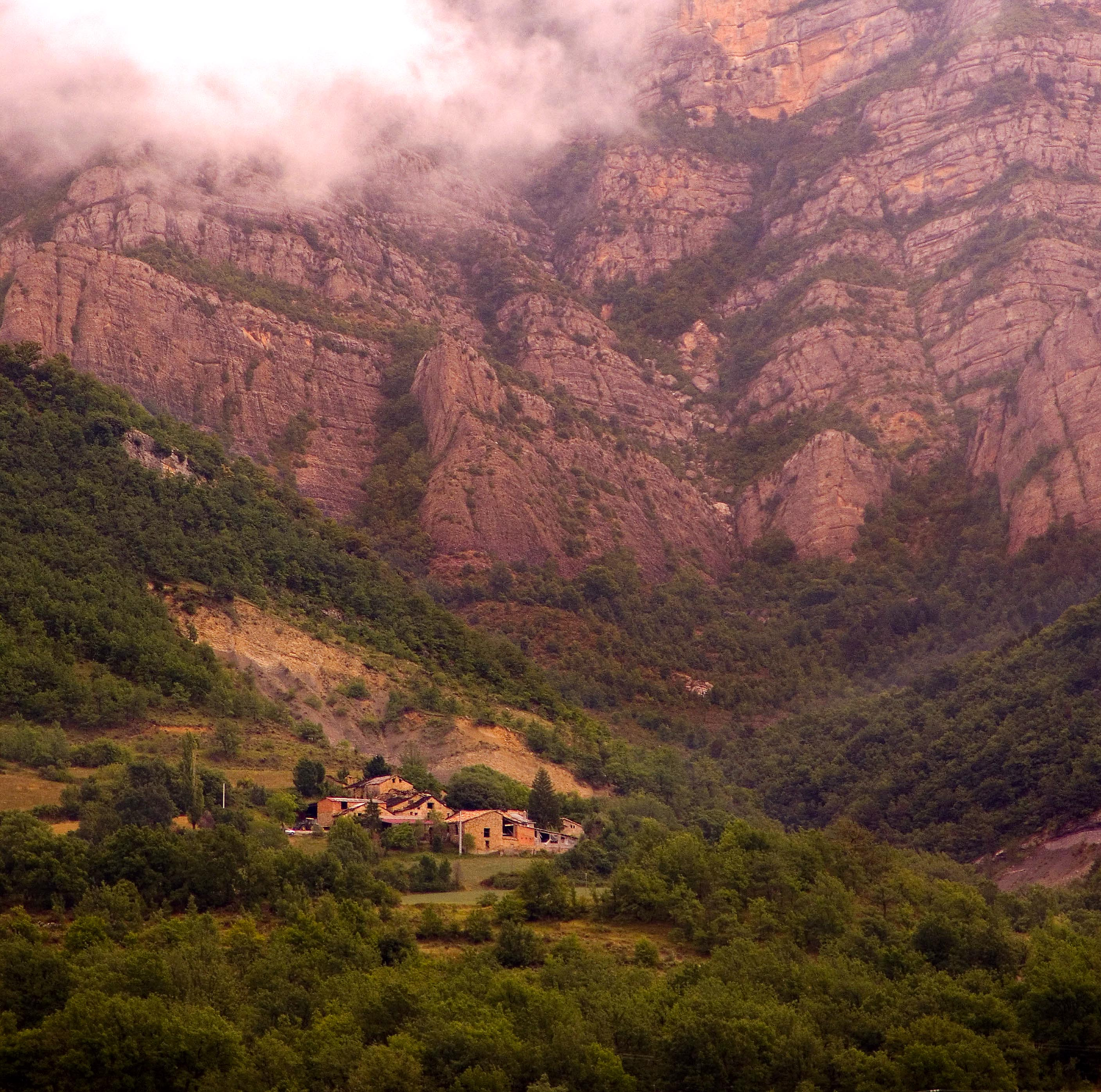

- Location within Aragon Location within Spain
- Coordinates: 42°20′25″N 0°34′31″E
- Country: Spain
- Autonomous community: Aragon
- Province: Province of Huesca
- Municipality: Beranuy
- Elevation: 953 m (3,127 ft)

Population
  - Total: 10

Biascas de Obarra is a locality located in the municipality of Beranuy, in Huesca province, Aragon, Spain. As of 2020, it has a population of 10.

== Geography ==
Biascas de Obarra is located 121km east-northeast of Huesca.
