= El Turbón =

Mountain massif in Aragon, Spain

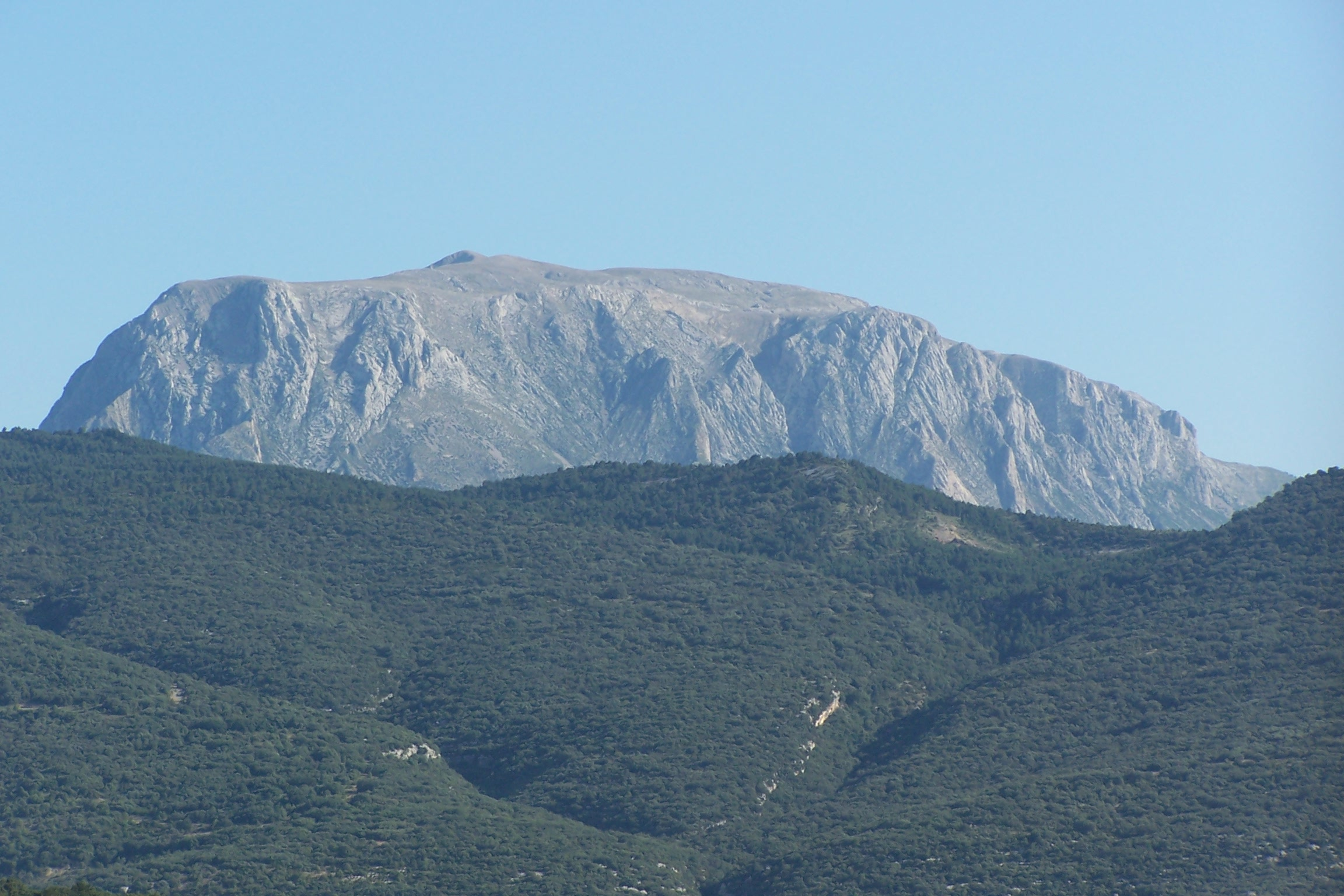
- View of El Turbón

Highest point
- Elevation: 2,492 m (8,176 ft)
- Prominence: 1,020 m (3,350 ft)
- Listing: List of mountains in Aragon, Ribu
- Coordinates: 42°25′N 0°30′E

Geography
- Location within Pyrenees
- Location: Ribagorza (comarca), Aragon
- Parent range: Pre-Pyrenees

Geology
- Mountain type: Marl (Cretaceous)

Climbing
- Easiest route: From the Merendero de la Muria, between Pont de Suert and Castejón de Sos

El Turbón is a mountain massif of the Pre-Pyrenees, located in the province of Huesca, the most northerly province in the autonomous community of Aragon, Spain. This 6.3 km (4 mi) long mountain is aligned N - S.

It is fairly easy to climb El Turbón, but it is better not to do so in mid summer when this great expanse of naked rock can reach very high temperatures.

== Geology ==
El Turbón has a massive rocky limestone outcrop at its centre made of Cretaceous marl. There are caves and shafts in the mountain. The Isábena River flows on the eastern side, separating El Turbón massif from the Mountains of Sis range.

== Features ==
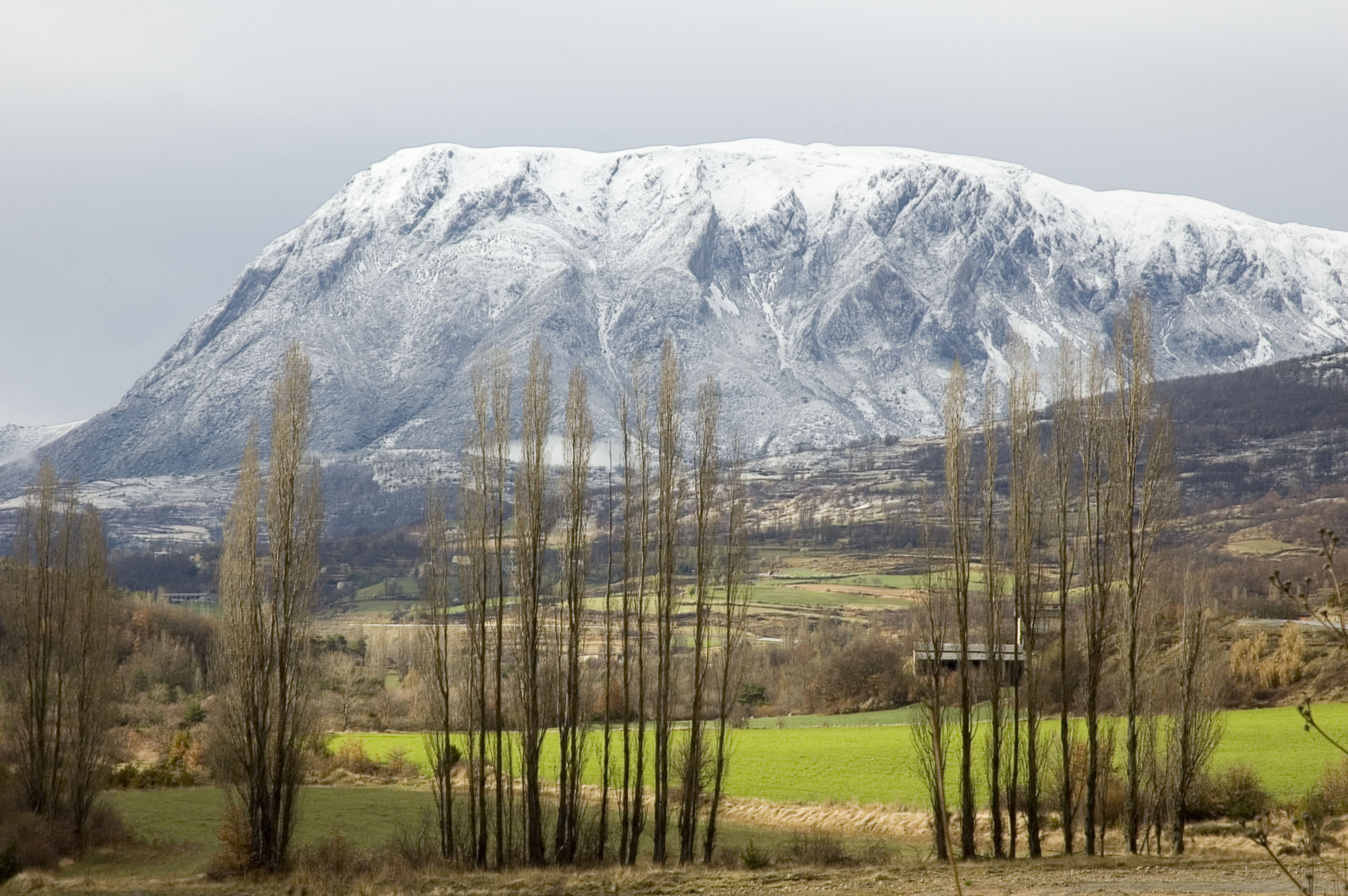
View of El Turbón with snow in the winter.

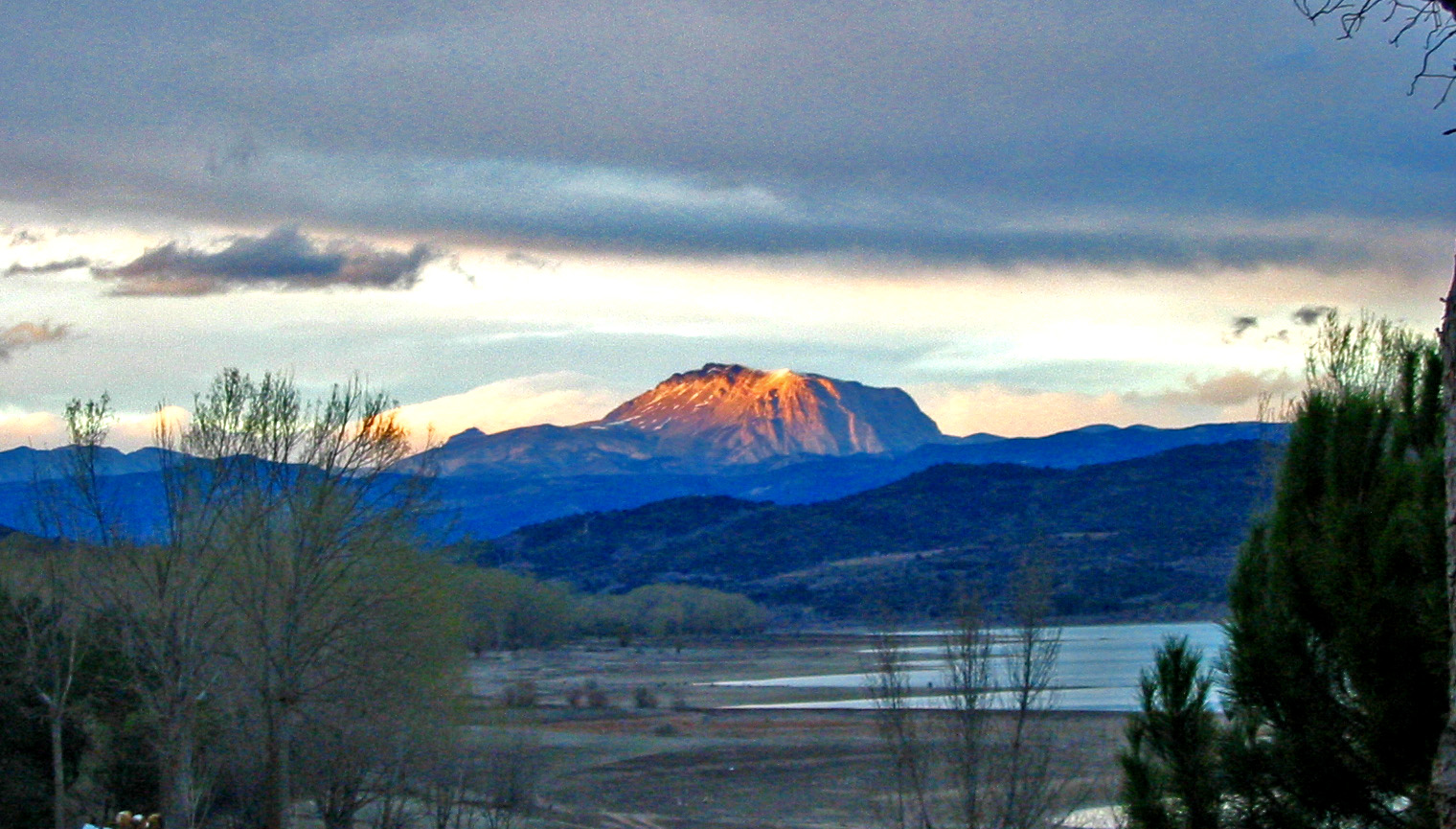
El Turbón seen from the Barasona dam

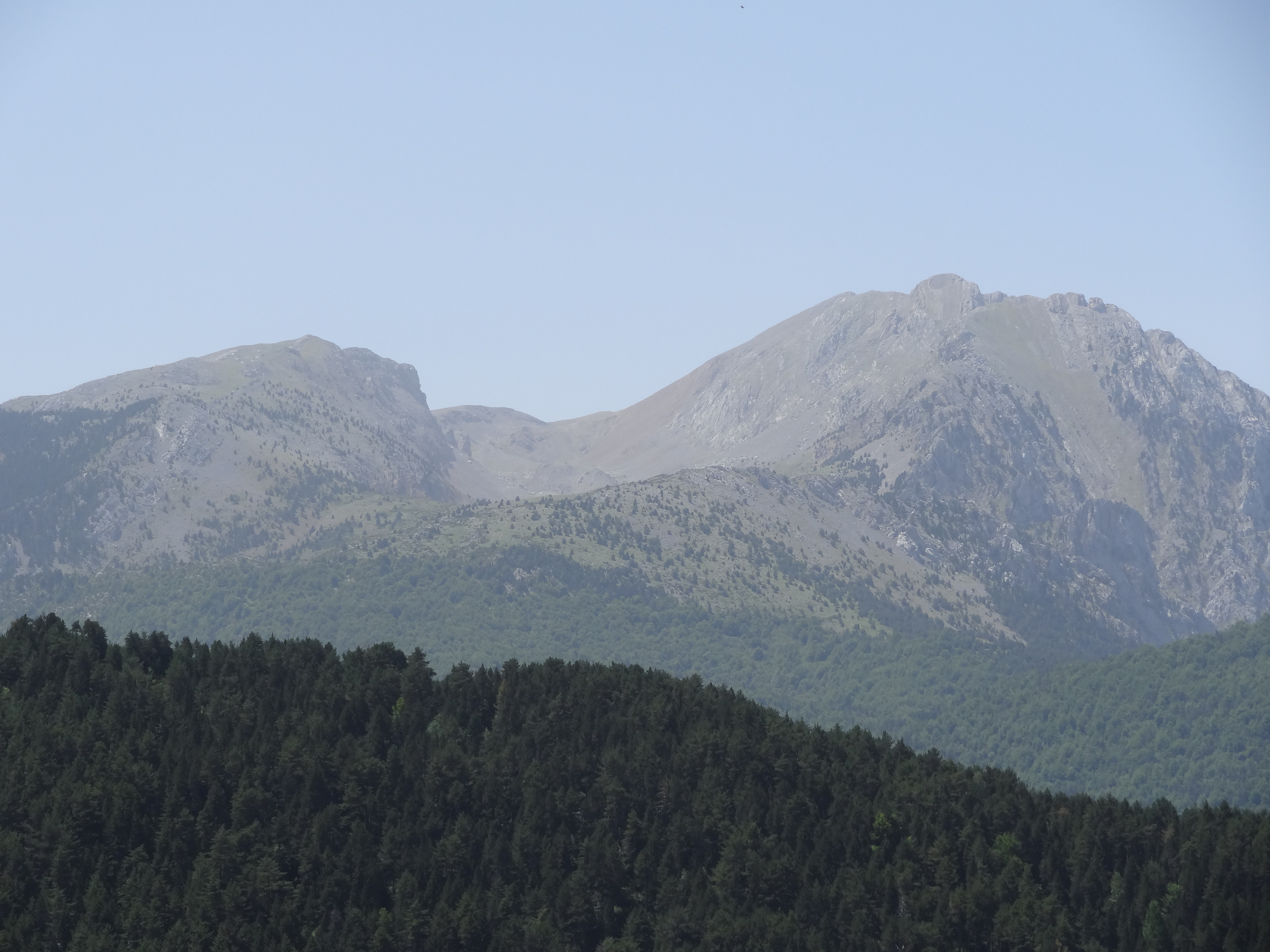
El Turbón seen from the north.

== See also ==
- List of caves in Spain
- List of mountains in Aragon
- Ribagorça
