= Santa María de Obarra =

Monastery in Beranui, Spain

Coordinates: 41°23′23″N 0°35′48″E

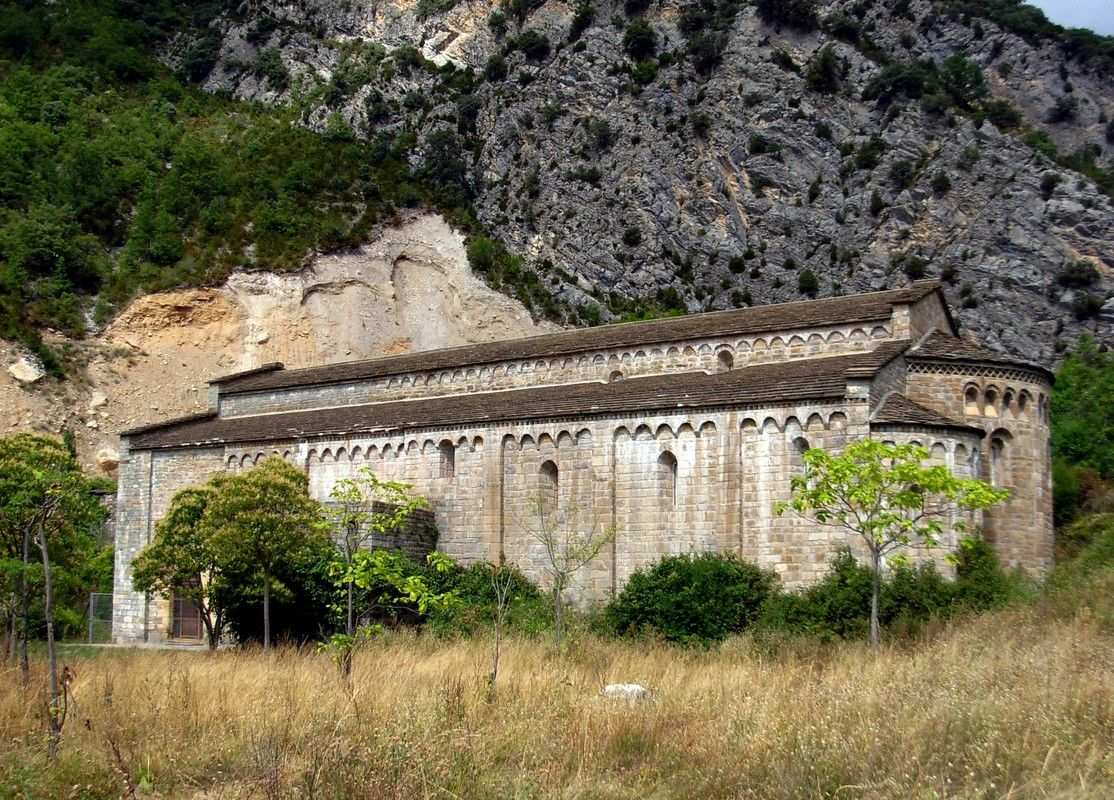
View of the monastery

The Monastery of Santa María de Obarra is a monastery in Beranui, Aragon, Spain. It was established in the 9th century.

This monastery is located in the Pre-Pyrenees at the foot of the Mountains of Sis, close to the Isábena River.
