= Morens, Huesca =

Morens
- Locality
- Moréns
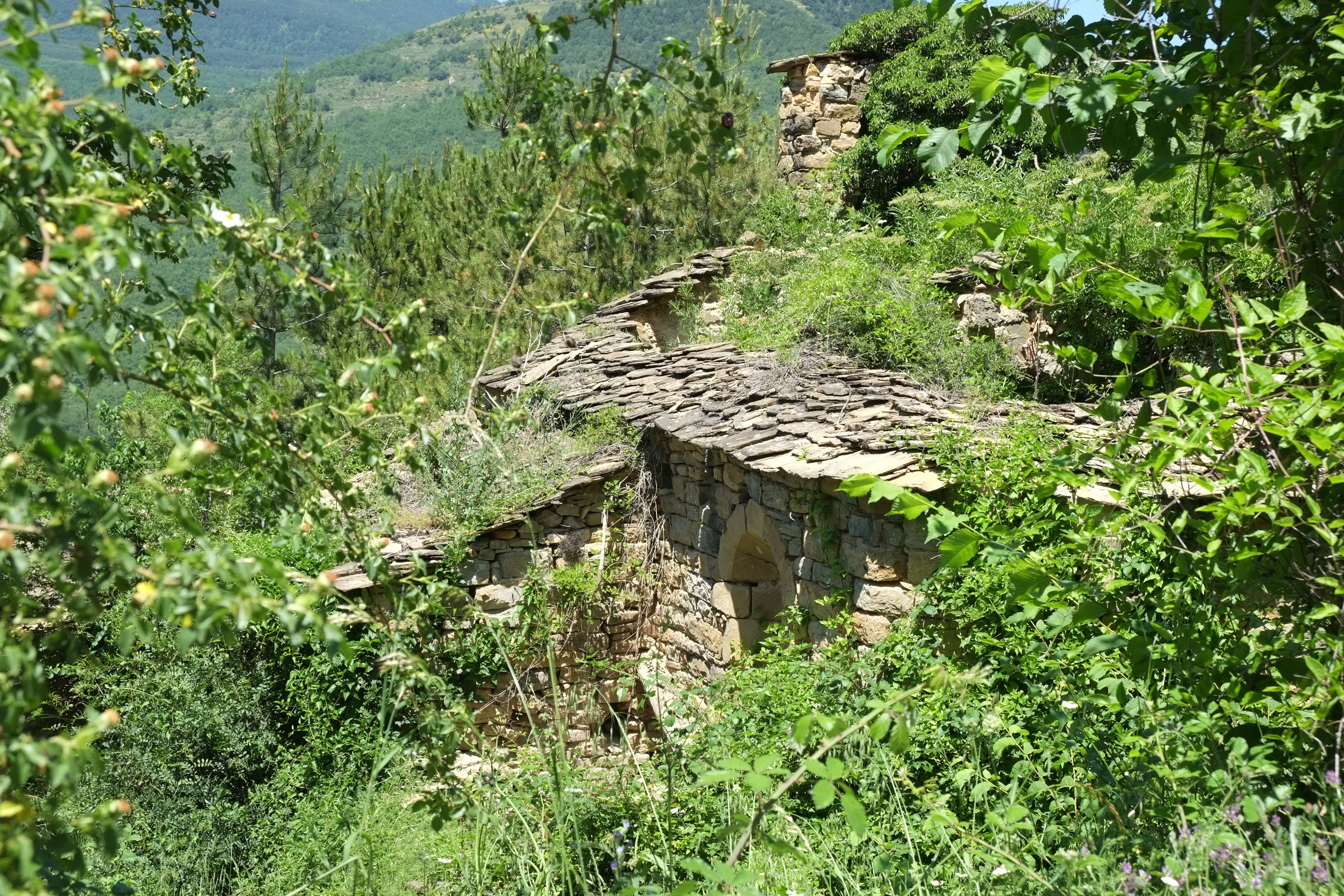

- Location within Aragon Location within Spain
- Coordinates: 42°22′23″N 0°36′7″E
- Country: Spain
- Autonomous community: Aragon
- Province: Province of Huesca
- Municipality: Beranuy
- Elevation: 1,086 m (3,563 ft)

Population
  - Total: 0

Morens or Moréns is a locality located in the municipality of Beranuy, in Huesca province, Aragon, Spain. As of 2020, it has a population of 0.

== Geography ==
Morens is located 126 km east-northeast of Huesca.
