= Isábena (river) =

River in Spain

Coordinates: 42°11′N 0°20′E

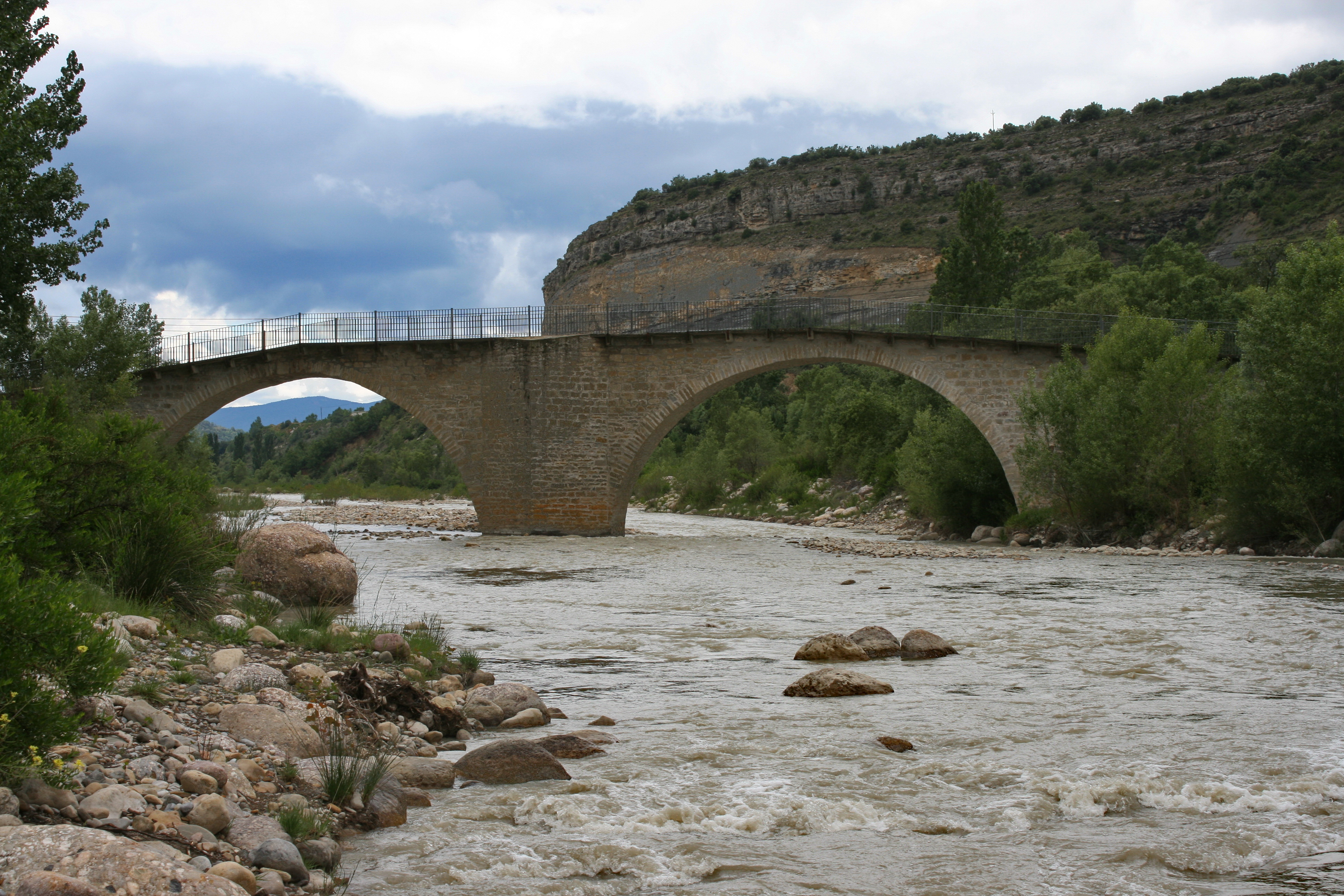
Bridge over the Isábena

The Isábena is the principal tributary of the river Ésera, itself a tributary of the Cinca, which flows into the Ebro and thence to the Mediterranean Sea. Its head is 2,400 metres above sea level at a place called Es Sebollés, between the peaks Gallinero and Cibollés in the Pyrenees of High Aragon. Its valley lies primarily in the comarca of Ribagorza.

The Isábena flows between the massive El Turbón mountain and the Mountains of Sis range.
