= Plaza of Our Lady of the Pillar =

Square in Zaragoza, Spain

Coordinates: 41.6563°N 0.8787°W

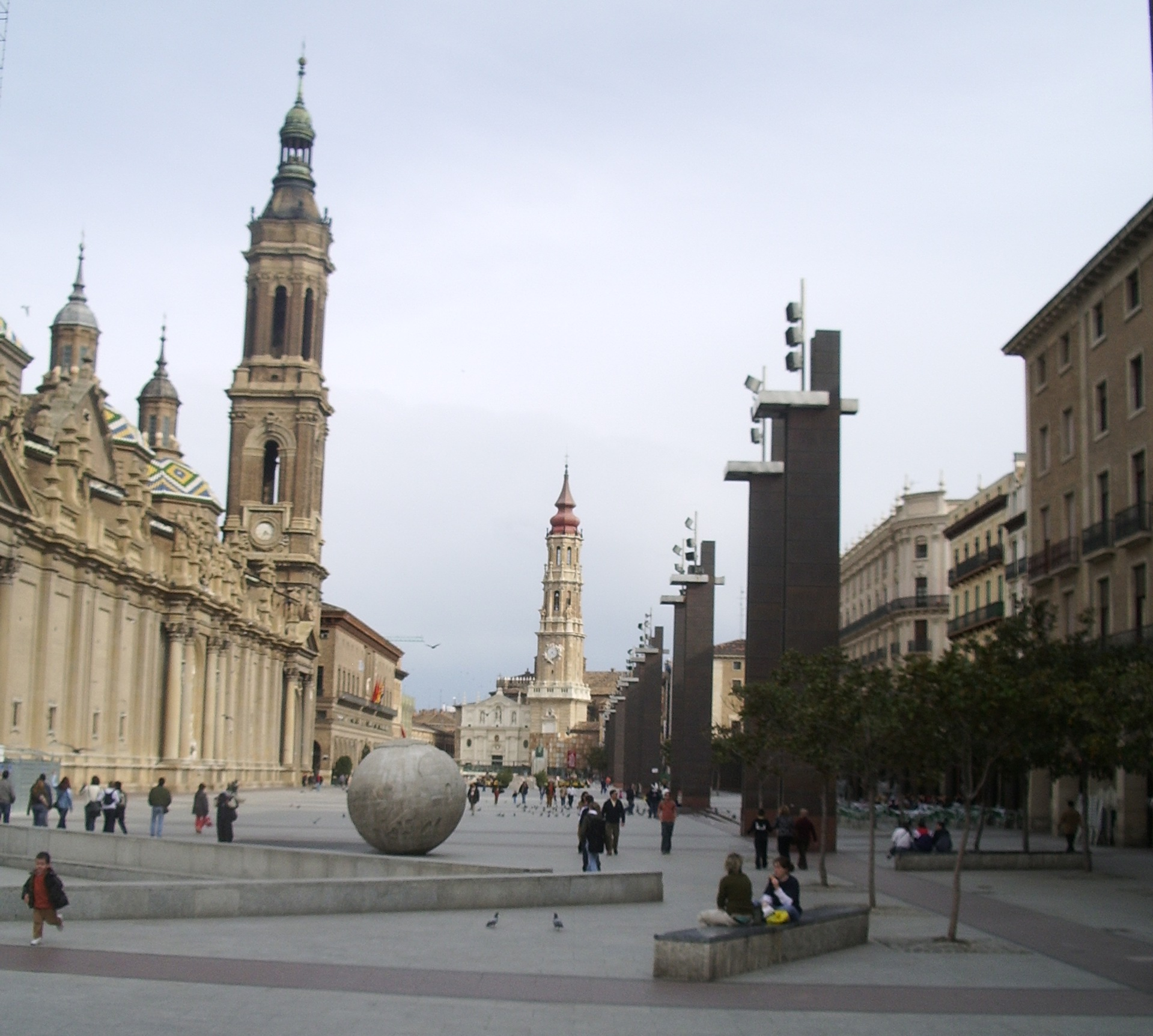
The plaza, with the cathedral to the left

The Plaza of Our Lady of the Pillar (in Spanish: Plaza de Nuestra Señora del Pilar or simply Plaza del Pilar) is one of the busiest popular places in Zaragoza, Spain. In it is the Cathedral-Basilica of Our Lady of the Pillar, where the homonymous Marian invocation is venerated. It is known by the nickname of "El salón de la ciudad" (in English: the hall of the city), since many public parties are held there.

Plaza del Pilar is the largest pedestrian plaza in the European Union and the second largest on the continent only behind Red Square in Moscow. It is also called Plaza de las Catedrales (in English: Plaza of the Cathedrals), because it has the two cathedrals of Zaragoza: the Seo and the Pilar. It is the only one in Spain with two cathedrals in the same square.

In this plaza are, in addition to the Basilica del Pilar, buildings such as the city hall, the Fountain of Hispanicity, the Cathedral of El Salvador (La Seo) and a monument to Goya.
