= Fuente de la Hispanidad =

Coordinates: 41.6571°N 0.8807°W

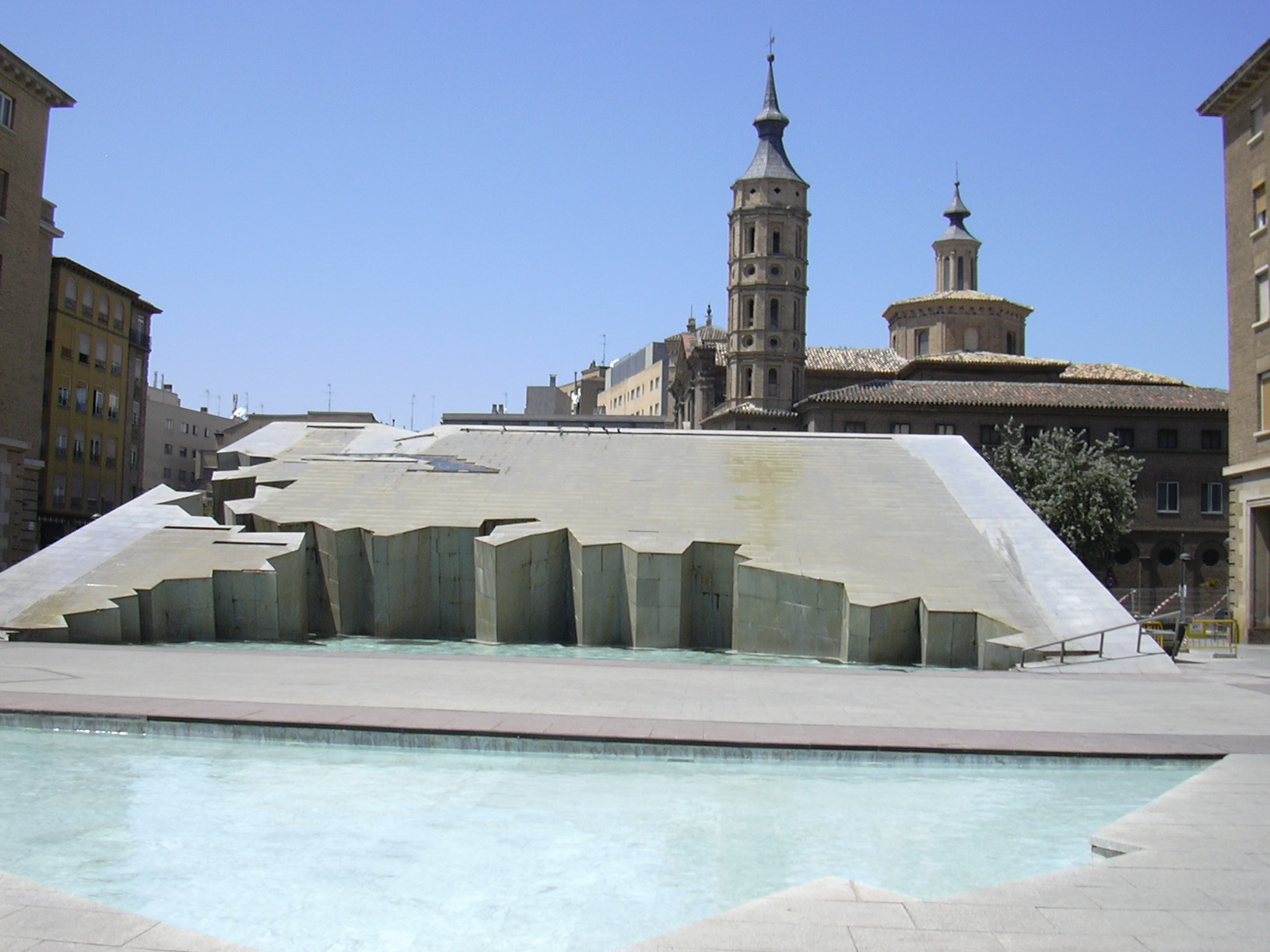
Fuente de la Hispanidad

The Fountain of Hispanicity (Fuente de la Hispanidad) is located on the eastern end of the Plaza Del Pilar (2026).

The Fuente de la Hispanidad (translatable into English as Fountain of Hispanicity) is located in the Plaza del Pilar near the Cathedral of Our Lady of the Pillar in the Spanish city of Zaragoza. As part of the renovations made to the plaza in 1991, this fountain was built in honor of Hispanicity.

His figure draws the map of Latin America. In the northern part, a groove forms the map of the Yucatán Peninsula and Central America. A waterfall falls into the pond that simulates the shape of South America.

The fountain is complemented by 3 prismatic blocks of different concrete dimensions covered with white marble, which evoke the 3 caravels on which Christopher Columbus embarked, and with a concrete-made globe.
