= Zaragoza =

Capital of Aragon, Spain

Zaragoza Saragossa
- Municipality
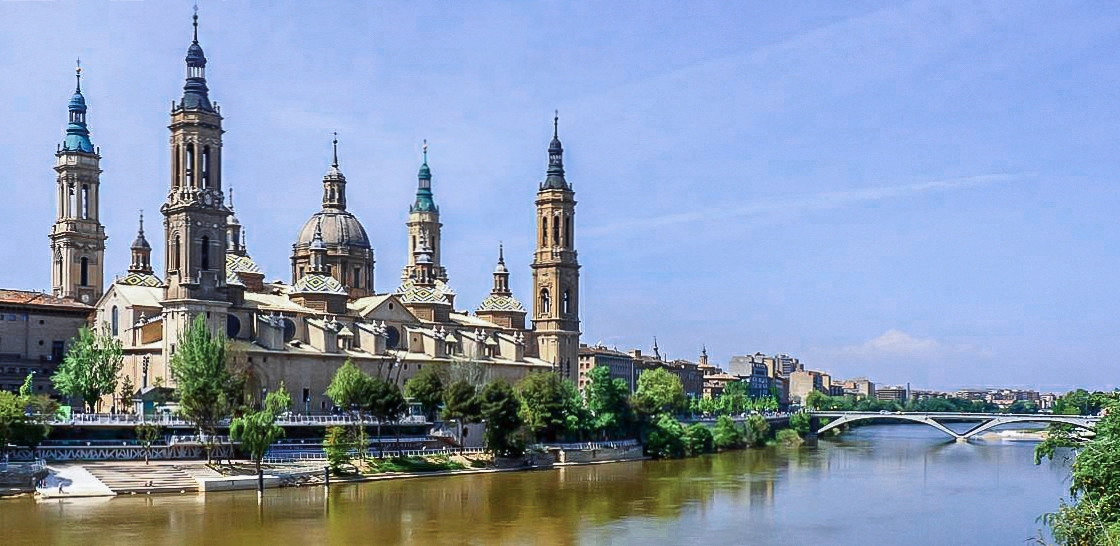
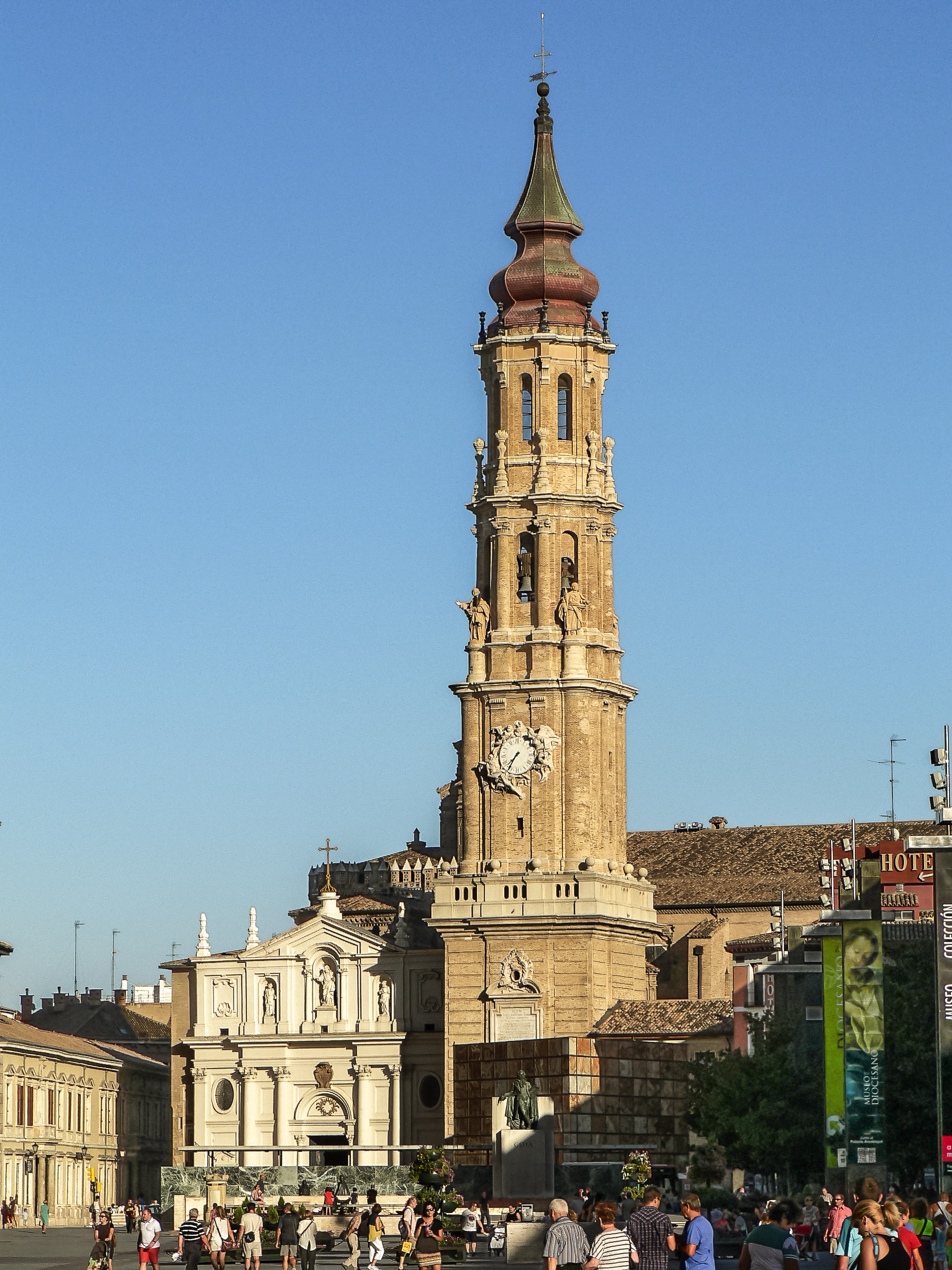
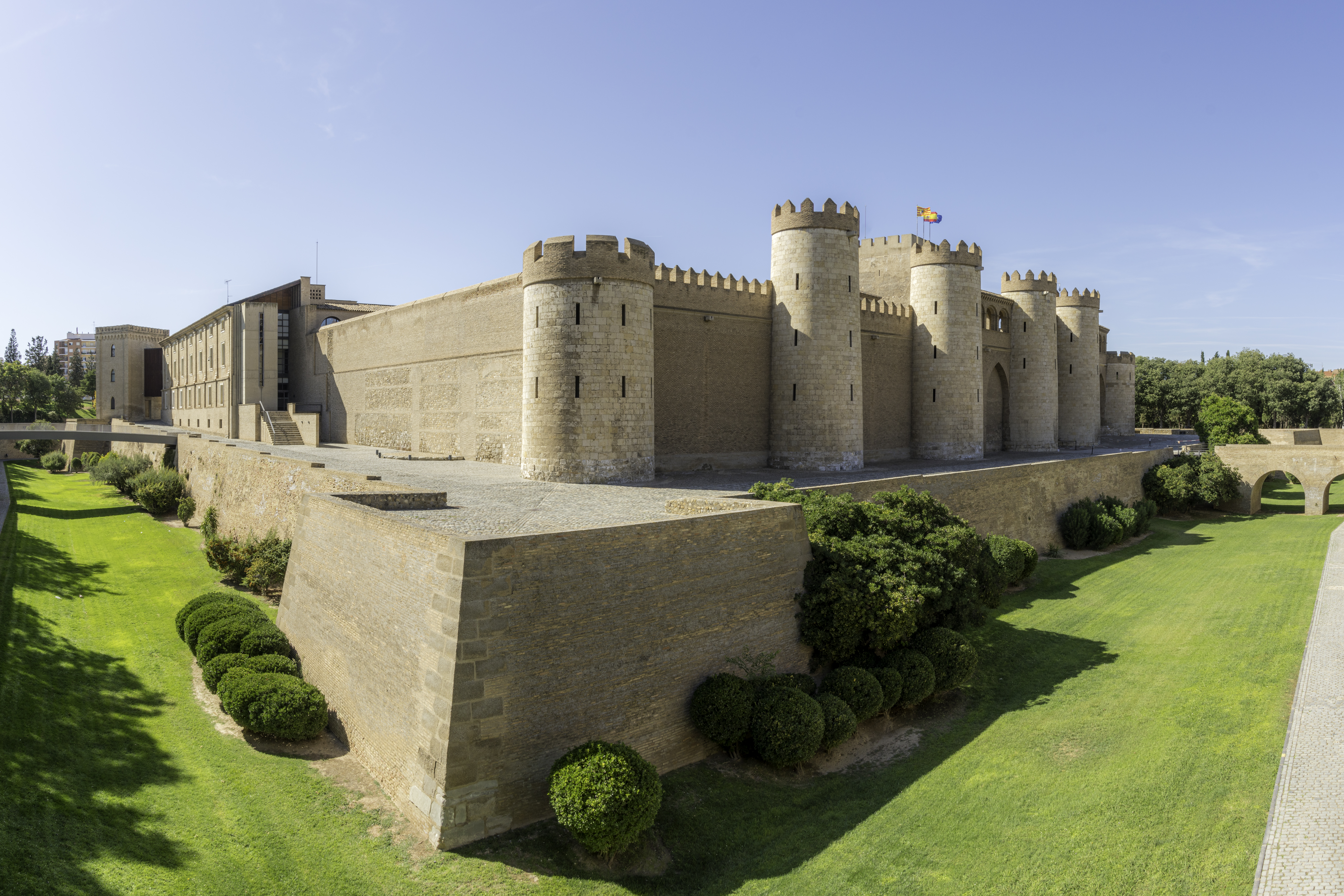
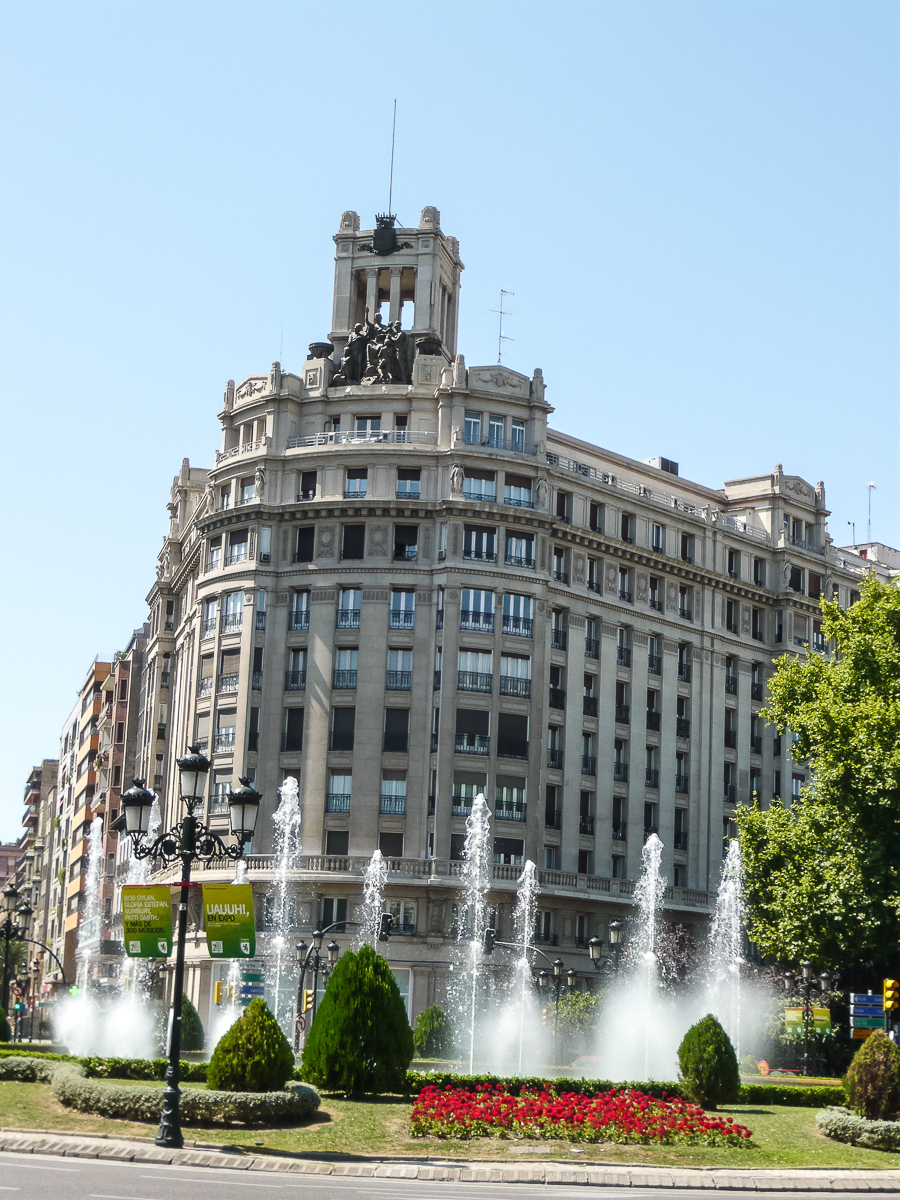
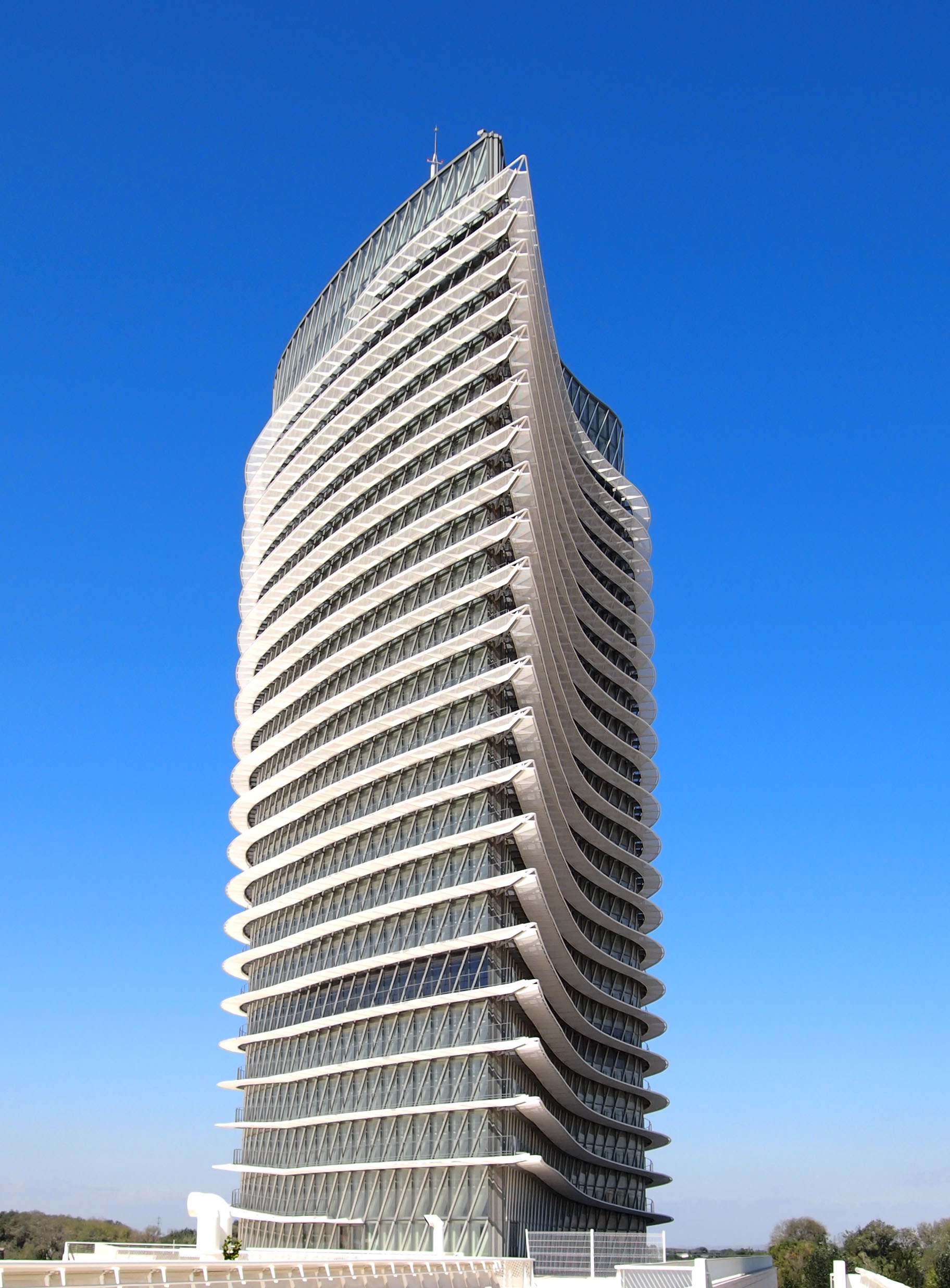
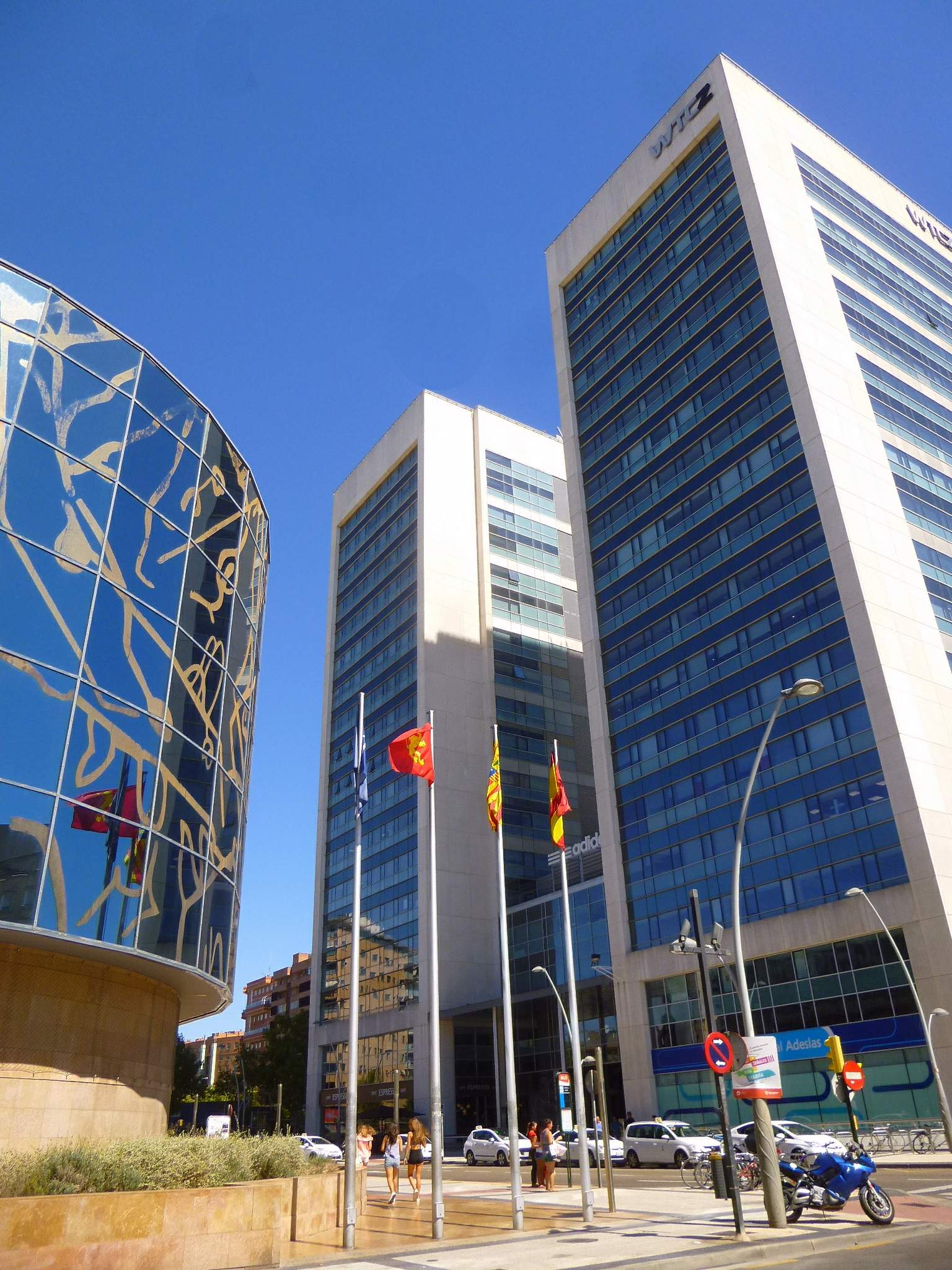
- Cathedral-Basilica of Our Lady of the Pillar La Seo Aljafería Gran Vía Torre del Agua WTCZ

- Flag Coat of arms
- Nickname: The Florence of Spain
- Interactive map of Zaragoza
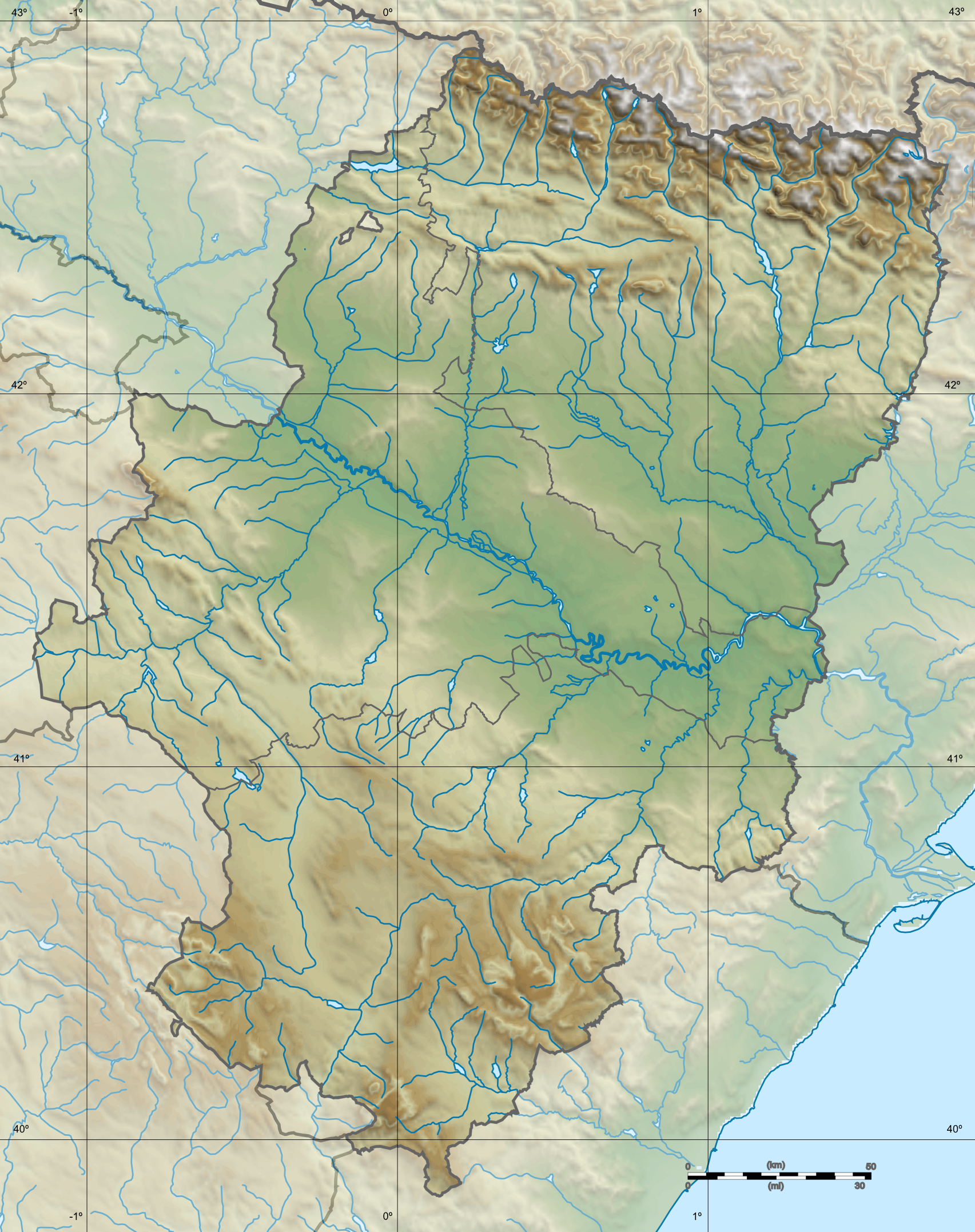
- Location within Spain Location within Aragon Location within Europe
- Coordinates: 41°39′N 0°53′W
- Country: Spain
- Autonomous community: Aragon
- Province: Zaragoza
- Comarca: Zaragoza
- Districts: Centro, Casco Histórico, Delicias, Universidad, San José, Las Fuentes, La Almozara, Oliver-Valdefierro, Torrero-La Paz, Actur-Rey Fernando, El Rabal, Casablanca, Santa Isabel, Miralbueno, Sur, Distrito Rural

Government
  - Type: Ayuntamiento
  - Body: Ayuntamiento de Zaragoza
  - Mayor: Natalia Chueca (PP)

Area
  - Municipality: 974.00 km^{2} (376.06 sq mi)
- Elevation: 243 m (797 ft)
- Highest elevation (Cabezo Armijo): 652 m (2,139 ft)

Population (2025)
  - Municipality: 699,007
  - Rank: 4th in Spain; 1st in Aragon
  - Density: 717.67/km^{2} (1,858.7/sq mi)
  - Urban: 754,695
  - Metro: 765,168
  - Seat/Locality: 666,453
- Demonym(s): Zaragozan, Saragossan, zaragozano (m.), zaragozana (f.)

GDP
  - Metro: €26.004 billion (2020)
- Time zone: UTC+01:00 (CET)
  - Summer (DST): UTC+02:00 (CEST)
- Postal codes: 50001–50022
- INE code: 50297
- Website: zaragoza.es

Zaragoza (Spanish: [θaɾaˈɣoθa]), traditionally known in English as Saragossa (/ˌsærəˈɡɒsə/ SARR-ə-GOSS-ə), is the capital city of the autonomous community of Aragon and the province of Zaragoza in Spain. It lies by the Ebro river and its tributaries, the Huerva and the Gállego, roughly in the centre of both Aragon and the Ebro basin.

As of 2025, Zaragoza had a population of 699,007, making it the 4th most populous city in Spain, on a land area of 974.00 square kilometres (376.06 square miles) and is the centre of a metropolitan area of around 760,000. The municipality is home to more than 50% of the Aragonese population. The city lies at an elevation of about 208 metres (682 feet) above sea level.

In the 1st century BCE, Romans founded the colony of Caesaraugusta over the Sedetani settlement of Salduie. The city was the capital of the Upper March of Al-Andalus under Umayyad rule, later thriving as a capital of a rump state ruled by the Banu Hud, the taifa of Zaragoza. It swiftly became the political and spiritual centre of the Kingdom of Aragon after the 1118 Christian conquest, and its inhabitants managed to preserve and consolidate initially granted privileges over the course of the Late Middle Ages.

Zaragoza hosted Expo 2008 in mid-2008, a world's fair on water and sustainable development. It was also a candidate for the European Capital of Culture in 2016.

The city is famous for its folklore, local cuisine, and landmarks such as the Basílica del Pilar, La Seo Cathedral and the Aljafería Palace. Together with La Seo and the Aljafería, several other buildings form part of the Mudéjar Architecture of Aragon which is a UNESCO World Heritage Site. The Fiestas del Pilar are among the most celebrated festivals in Spain.

== Etymology ==
The Iberian town that preceded Roman colonisation was called Salduie or Salduba. The Romans called the ancient city Caesaraugusta (in Greek Καισαραυγοῦστα, Kaisaraugoûsta), from which derive the Arabic name سرقسطة Saraqusṭa (used during the Al-Andalus period), the old romance Çaragoça, and the modern Zaragoza.

== History ==
The Sedetani, a tribe of ancient Iberians, populated a village called Salduie (Salduba in Roman sources).

=== Roman Caesaraugusta ===
Roman Caesaraugusta 1.- Decumano; 2.- Cardo; 3.- Forum; 4.- Port; 5.- Thermal baths; 6.- Theatre; 7.- Walls

Augustus founded the city as Caesaraugusta between 25 BC and 11 BC as a colony to settle army veterans from the Cantabrian wars. As a Roman city, it had all the typical public buildings: forum, baths, theatre, and was an important economic centre. Many Roman ruins can still be seen in Zaragoza today.

It is thought it might have been the Apostle James who had built a chapel on the site of the Cathedral-Basilica of Our Lady of the Pillar.

On the spot where Saint Engratia and her companions were said to have been martyred on Valerian's orders was the Church of Santa Engracia de Zaragoza. Only the crypt and the doorway survived the Peninsular War. Around the early 20th century it was rebuilt, and is now a functioning parish church.

=== Middle Ages ===
Map of Zaragoza (Saraqusta) during the Muslim rule, superimposed on the current city (light grey)

Despite the general decline of the last centuries of the Roman empire, Zaragoza suffered little. Capture by the Goths in the fifth century AD was without significant bloodshed or destruction.

In the eighth century, following the Umayyad conquest of the Iberian Peninsula, Zaragoza became the capital of the Upper March of al-Andalus.

In 1018, amid the collapse of the Caliphate of Córdoba, Zaragoza became an independent Taifa of Zaragoza, initially controlled by the Tujibid family, then ruled by the Banu Hud from 1039. The taifa greatly prospered in a cultural and political sense in the late 11th century, and being later governed by Ahmad al-Muqtadir, Yusuf al-Mu'taman ibn Hud and Al-Musta'in II. It fell to the Almoravids in 1110.

On 18 December 1118, Alfonso I of Aragon conquered the city from the Almoravids, and made it the capital of the Kingdom of Aragon. The aforementioned monarch created a jurisdictional dominion in the city, which was gifted to Gaston of Béarn. The city remained a lordship up until the early 13th century.

==== Jewish community ====
There was a Jewish community in medieval Zaragoza, a notable center where yeshivas also incorporated the study of philosophy alongside Talmud studies. In the 11th century, the city was home to several notable Jewish physicians, including Menahem ibn al-Fawwal and Jonah ibn Janah, the latter of whom also gained renown as a Hebrew grammarian. Ibn Janah authored Kitāb al-Talkhīṣ, which included detailed descriptions of drugs, weights and measures used in medicine. Another prominent figure was Jonah ibn Biklārish, who served as court physician to Sultan Al-Musta'in II and authored Kitāb al-Musta'īnī, a drug manual written in table form that included names and properties of drugs.

The Jewish community of Zaragoza had seven synagogues, two of which are known by location today: Le Mayor (the main synagogue) and the synagogue "de los Callizos" or "de Cehán." The community was spared from the 1391 pogroms, in large part due to the presence of the king and the intervention of the prominent Jewish leader Ḥasdai Crescas. In 1481, the Crown appointed the monk Miguel Ferrer to enforce the segregation of Jewish households in Zaragoza, but his extreme cruelty led King Ferdinand II to remove him from the post. On 29 April 1492, the Crown's decision to expel the Jews was announced in Zaragoza to the kingdom's procurators, two days before the Edict of Expulsion was formally proclaimed in Castile. The city's rabbi, Açach Chaqon, was ordered on 13 May to leave the Jewish quarter within a day and the kingdom within three. Most of the Jewish community eventually departed Zaragoza between 27 and 29 July, traveling to the port of Sagunto to go into exile.

In the months following the expulsion, the Crown and the Inquisition supervised the confiscation and transfer of communal property, including Torah scrolls, silver crowns, decorative cloths, and other ritual objects, many of which were dismantled, redistributed, or given to city authorities and religious institutions. In late 1493, Zaragoza formally received the Jewish quarter and its associated buildings.

=== Early modern history ===
An outbreak of bubonic plague decimated the city in 1564. It reportedly killed about 10,000 people out of an estimated population of 25–30,000.

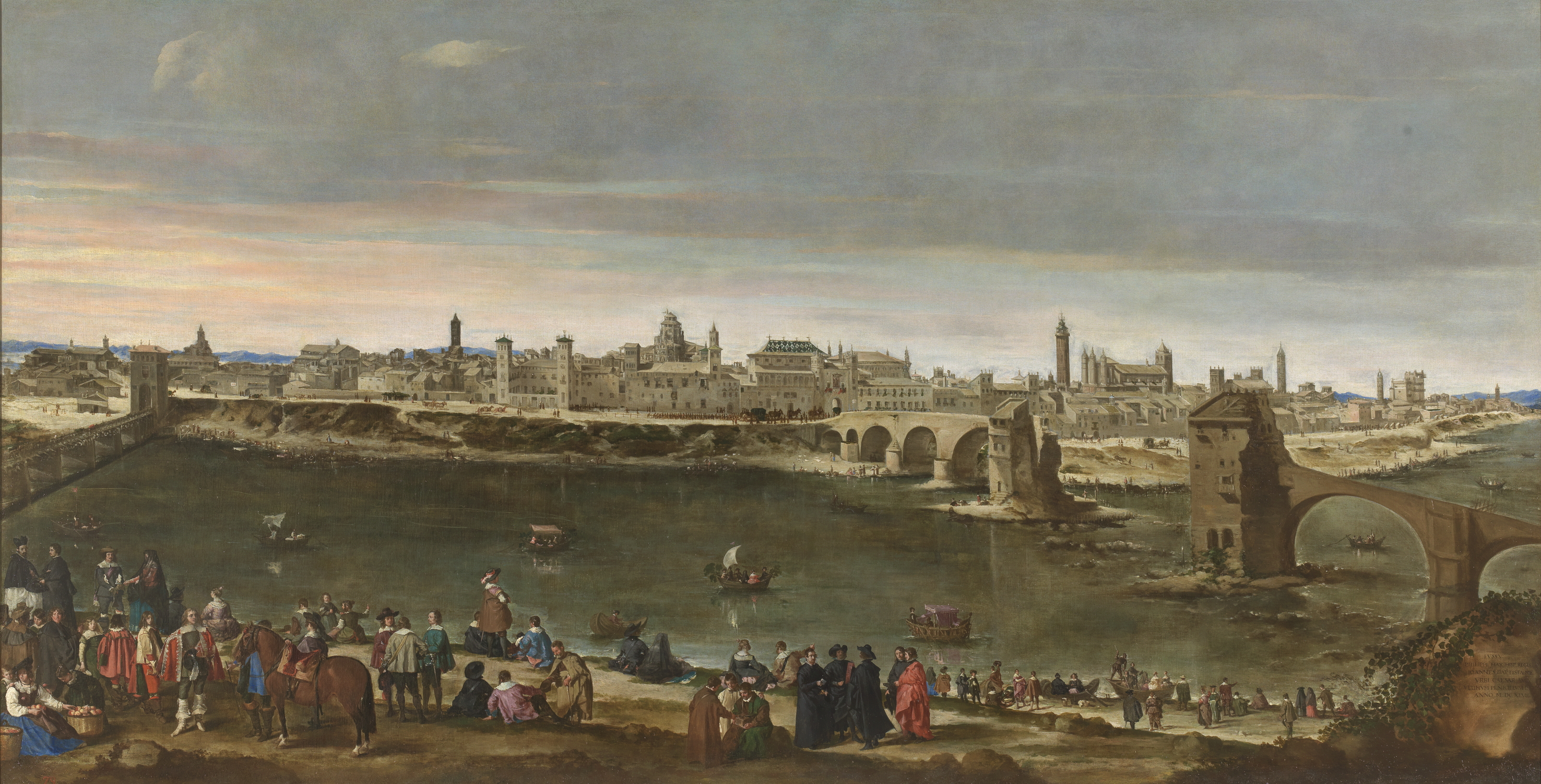
View of Zaragoza (1647) by Juan Bautista Martínez del Mazo

In the context of the 1701–1714 War of the Spanish Succession, the city rose in arms in favour of the Archduke Charles, who was proclaimed "King of Aragon" in the city on 29 June 1706, following the uprising of other parts of the Kingdom of Aragon in December 1705. Charles entered the city in July 1706, directing the attack on those places of Aragon that had sided with the Bourbon faction such as Borja or the Cinco Villas. Following the April 1707 battle at Almansa, the tide turned with the Austracist forces fleeing in disarray, and the Bourbon forces commanded by the Duke of Orléans entering the city on 26 May 1707. As he seized control of the kingdom, he began to enact the series of institutional reforms known as the Nueva Planta, abolishing the Aragonese institutions in favour of the Castilian ones. The war turned around again in 1710 after the Battle of Almenar, and, following another Bourbon defeat near Zaragoza on 20 August 1710, Archduke Charles returned to the city on the next day. This was for only a brief period, though, as following the entry of Philip V in Madrid and the ensuing Battle of Villaviciosa in December 1710, the Habsburg armies fled from Zaragoza in haste in December 1710 and Philip V proceeded to consolidate his rule over the kingdom of Aragon, resuming administrative reforms after a period of institutional void.

An important food riot caused by the high price of bread and other necessity goods took place in the city in April 1766, the so-called motín de los broqueleros, named after the repressive agents, volunteer farmers and craftsmen who wielded swords and bucklers (broqueles). The repression left about 300 wounded, 200 detainees and 8 deaths and it was followed by 17 public executions, and an indeterminate number of killings at the dungeons of the Aljafería.

=== Late modern history ===
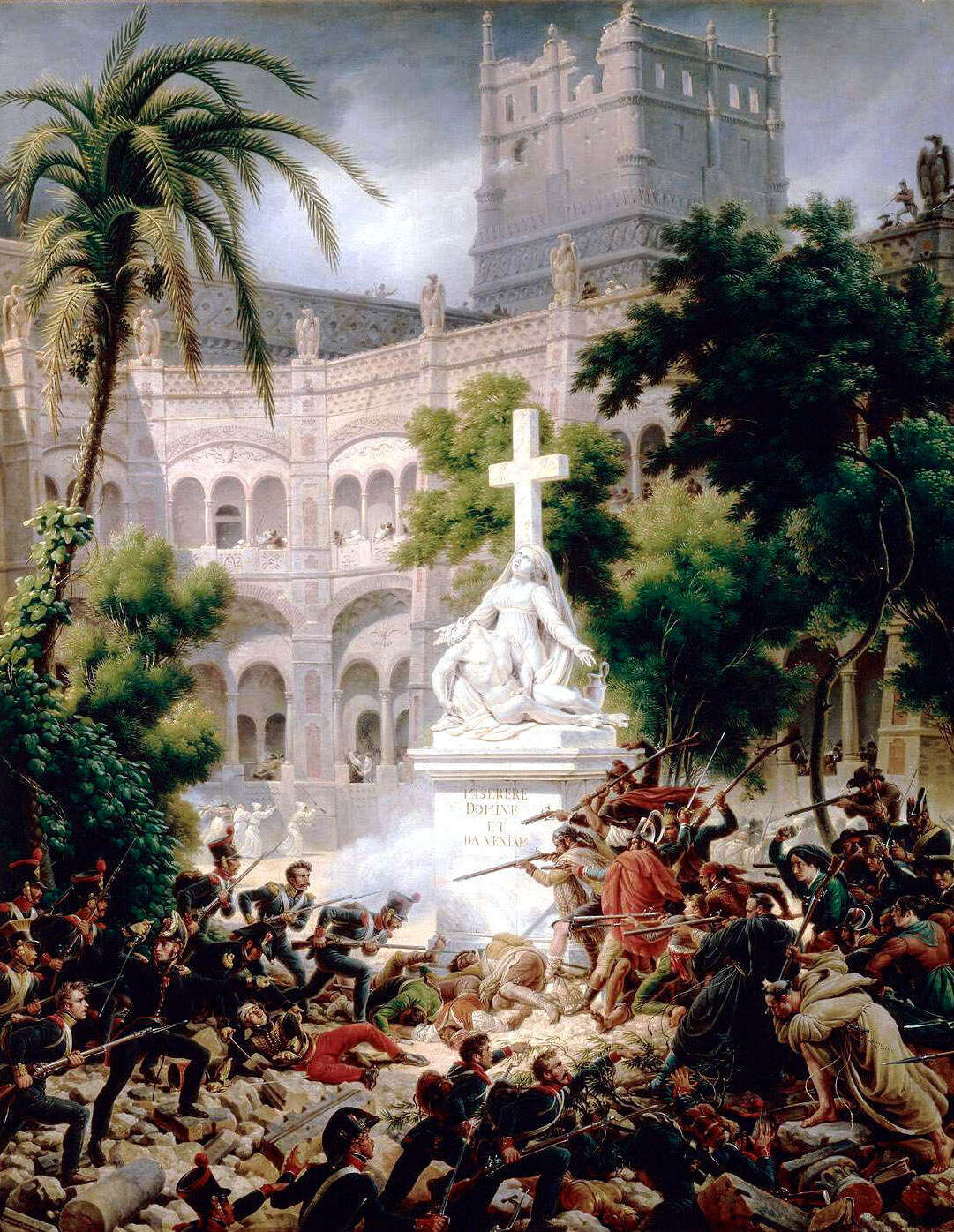
French troops assaulting the Abbey of Santa Engracia during the 1809 siege of Zaragoza

Zaragoza suffered two famous sieges during the Peninsular War against the Napoleonic army: a first from June to August 1808; and a second from December 1808 to February 1809, surrendering only after some 50,000 defenders had died.

Railway transport came to Zaragoza on 16 September 1861 with the inauguration of the Barcelona–Zaragoza line with the arrival of a train from the former city to the Estación del Norte. The Madrid–Zaragoza line was opened a year and a half later, on 16 May 1863.

The July 1936 coup d'état (with Gen. Miguel Cabanellas, Col. Monasterio, Urrutia, Sueiro, Major Cebollero and Gen.Gregorio de Benito at the centre of the Mola-led conspiration in Zaragoza) triumphed in the city. After the military uprising in Africa on 17 July, the military command easily attained its objectives in Zaragoza in the early morning of 19 July, despite the city's status as stronghold of organised labour (mostly CNT anarcho-syndicalists but also UGT trade unionists), as the civil governor critically refused to give weapons to the people in time. Many refugees, including members of the provincial committees of parties and unions, fled to Caspe, the capital of the territory of Aragon, which was still controlled by the Republic.

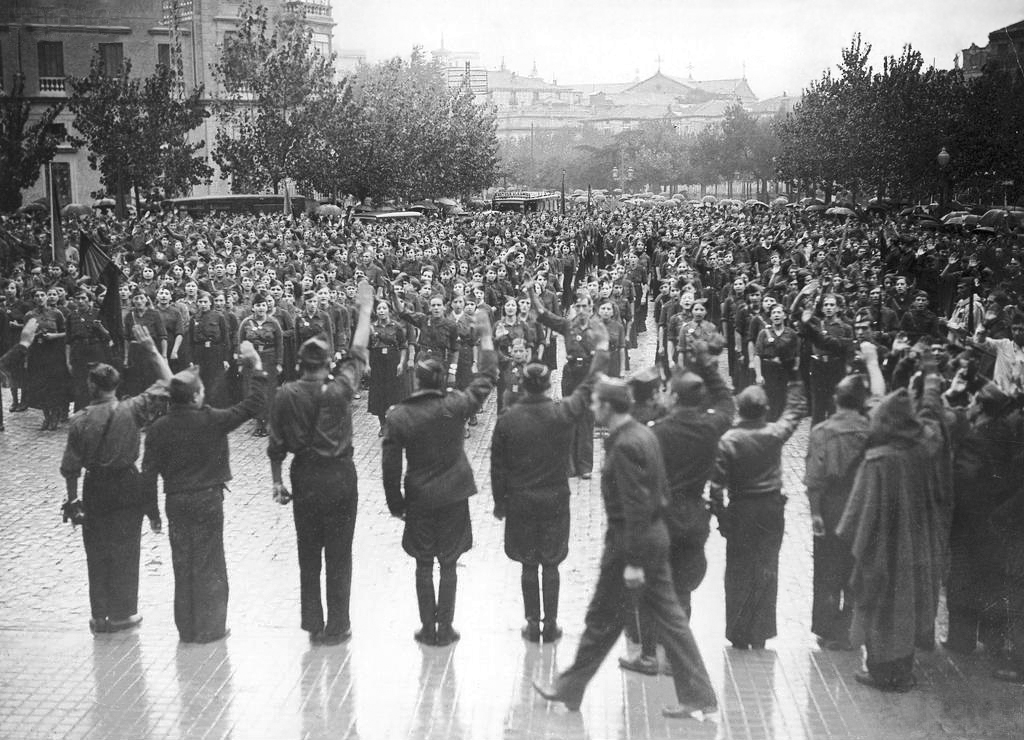
Falange members in front of the Basilica of El Pilar, 12 October 1936

The rearguard violence committed by the putschists, with at least 12 murders on 19 July, would only go in crescendo along the beginning of the conflict. Thus one of the two big cities under Rebel control since the early stages of the Spanish Civil War along with Seville, Zaragoza profited from an increasing industrial production vis-à-vis the war economy, playing a key role for the Francoist faction as ammunition manufacturer.

The General Military Academy, a higher training center of the Spanish Army, was re-established on 27 September 1940 by José Enrique Varela, the Francoist Minister of the Army.

The 1953 Accords ensued with the installment of a joint US–Spain air base in Zaragoza.

Following the declaration of Zaragoza as Polo de Desarrollo Industrial ("Pole for Industrial Development") by the regime in 1964, the city doubled in population in a short time. The increase in population ran parallel to the rural flight and depopulation in the rest of Aragon.

In 1979, a fire at the Hotel Corona de Aragón fire killed at least 80 people, including members of the family of Francisco Franco. The armed Basque nationalist and separatist organization ETA carried out the Zaragoza barracks bombing in 1987 which killed eleven people, including a number of children, leading to 250,000 people taking part in demonstrations in the city.

Since 1982, the city has been home to a large factory built by General Motors for the production of Opel cars, some of which are exported to the United Kingdom and sold under the Vauxhall brand. The city took advantage of the entry of Spain into the European Communities (later European Union).

== Geography ==
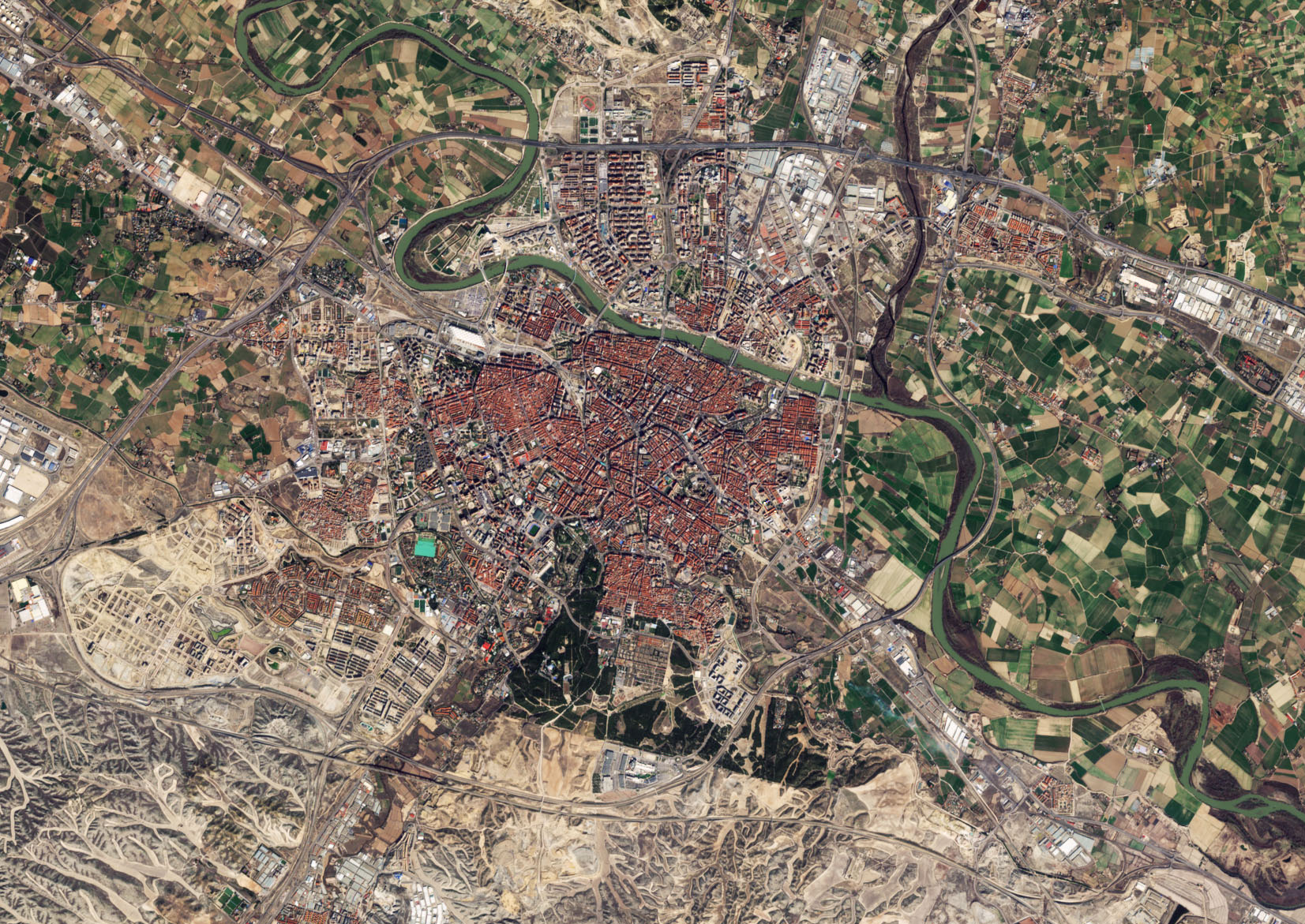
Zaragoza, as seen by the European Space Agency's Sentinel-2

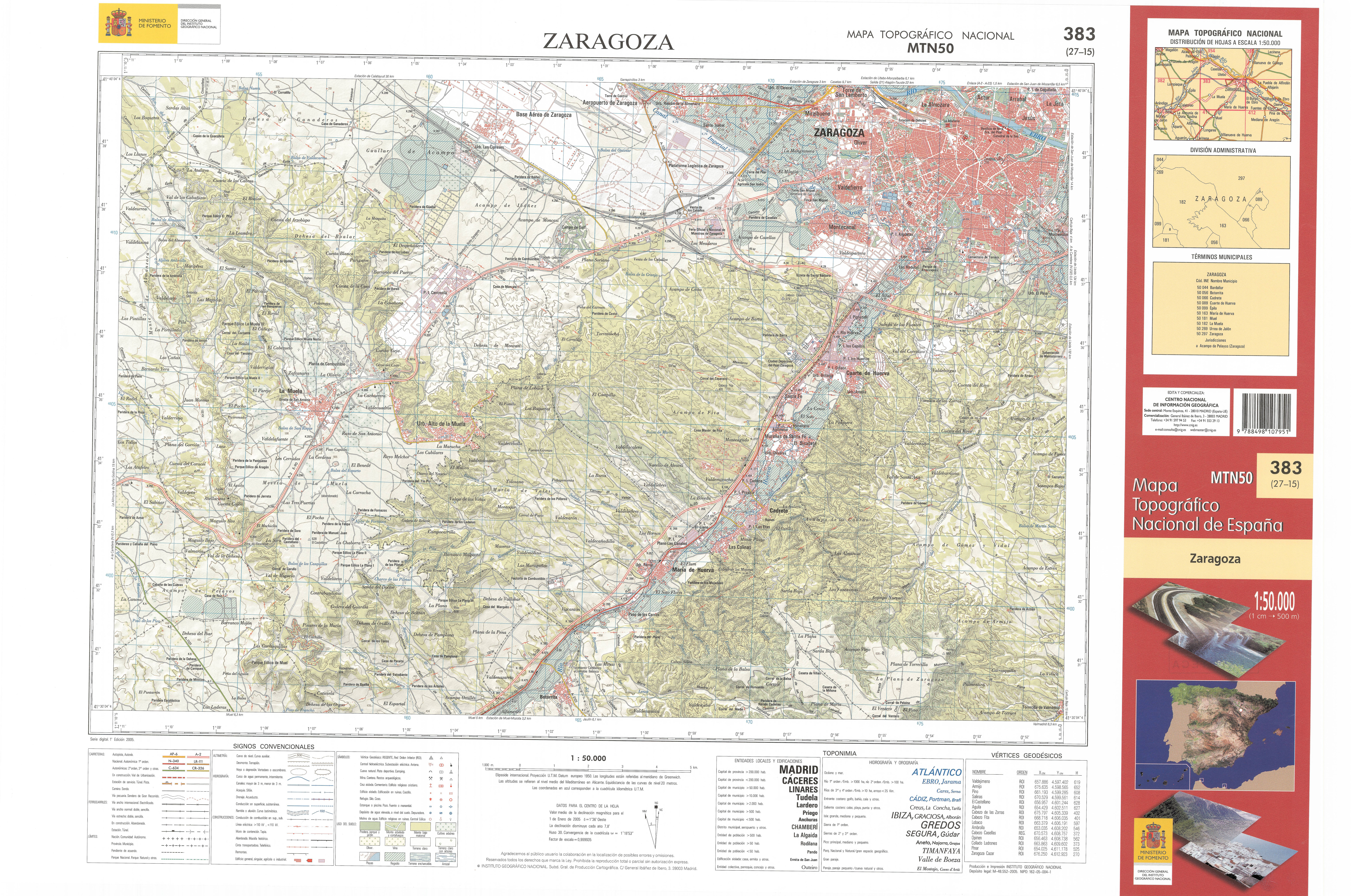
Zaragoza sheet of MTN50 (Spain's National Topographic Map at 1:50,000 scale), at its first digital edition (year 2006).

Zaragoza lies in the north-east of the Iberian Peninsula, in the rather arid depression formed by the valley of the Ebro. The Ebro cuts across the city in a west north-west by east south-east direction, entering the municipality at 205 metres above sea level and exiting the municipality at a level of 180 metres above sea level.

The city enjoys a beneficial location at the geographical centre of the rough hexagon formed by the Spanish cities of Bilbao, Madrid, Valencia and Barcelona and the French cities of Bordeaux and Toulouse.

The municipality has a surface of 973.78 km^{2} (375.98 sq mi), making it the ninth largest municipality in Spain.

While the river banks are largely flat, the territory flanking them can display a rugged terrain, featuring muelas and escarpments. The surrounding elevations rise up to heights of about 600–750 metres above sea level. The locations near the meanders of the Ebro feature some sinkholes formed upon the subsidence of the gypsum-rich soil, that can form ponds fed from irrigation water. There is also an instance of seasonal endorheic lagoon, la Sulfúrica, in the moors located in the southern part of the municipality.

The Roman core of Caesaraugusta was founded on the right bank of the Ebro, with the north-east corner limiting the confluence of the Ebro with the Huerva river, a modest right-bank tributary of the Ebro. The Huerva runs through the city buried for much of its lower course. Zaragoza is also located near the confluence of the Ebro with the Gállego, a more voluminous left-bank tributary born in the Pyrenees.

=== Climate ===
Zaragoza has a semi-arid climate (Köppen: BSk), as it lies in a wide basin entirely surrounded by mountains which block off moist air from the Atlantic and Mediterranean. The average annual precipitation is a scanty 328 millimetres (12.9 in) with abundant sunny days, and the rainiest seasons are spring (April–May) and autumn (September–November), with a relative drought in summer (July–August) and winter (December–March).

Temperatures in summer are hot, and in winter a cold and dry wind blows from the northwest, the Cierzo. Night frost is common and there is sporadic snowfall. Fog can be persistent in late autumn and early winter.

Climate data for Zaragoza Airport, altitude 263 m (1991-2020), extremes (1942-present)
Month	Jan	Feb	Mar	Apr	May	Jun	Jul	Aug	Sep	Oct	Nov	Dec	Year
Record high °C (°F)	20.6 (69.1)	25.5 (77.9)	28.7 (83.7)	32.4 (90.3)	37.5 (99.5)	43.2 (109.8)	44.5 (112.1)	42.8 (109.0)	39.3 (102.7)	33.9 (93.0)	28.4 (83.1)	22.0 (71.6)	44.5 (112.1)
Mean maximum °C (°F)	17.7 (63.9)	19.6 (67.3)	24.7 (76.5)	28.1 (82.6)	32.7 (90.9)	37.3 (99.1)	39.2 (102.6)	38.3 (100.9)	33.6 (92.5)	28.2 (82.8)	21.8 (71.2)	18.1 (64.6)	40.1 (104.2)
Mean daily maximum °C (°F)	11.0 (51.8)	13.4 (56.1)	17.5 (63.5)	20.4 (68.7)	24.9 (76.8)	30.0 (86.0)	32.8 (91.0)	32.4 (90.3)	27.4 (81.3)	21.8 (71.2)	15.0 (59.0)	11.1 (52.0)	21.5 (70.6)
Daily mean °C (°F)	7.0 (44.6)	8.5 (47.3)	11.8 (53.2)	14.4 (57.9)	18.6 (65.5)	23.1 (73.6)	25.7 (78.3)	25.6 (78.1)	21.4 (70.5)	16.6 (61.9)	10.8 (51.4)	7.2 (45.0)	15.9 (60.6)
Mean daily minimum °C (°F)	2.9 (37.2)	3.5 (38.3)	6.0 (42.8)	8.5 (47.3)	12.3 (54.1)	16.2 (61.2)	18.6 (65.5)	18.8 (65.8)	15.4 (59.7)	11.3 (52.3)	6.5 (43.7)	3.3 (37.9)	10.3 (50.5)
Mean minimum °C (°F)	−2.9 (26.8)	−2.0 (28.4)	0.3 (32.5)	3.0 (37.4)	6.8 (44.2)	11.3 (52.3)	14.2 (57.6)	14.1 (57.4)	10.0 (50.0)	4.8 (40.6)	−0.3 (31.5)	−2.9 (26.8)	−4.3 (24.3)
Record low °C (°F)	−10.4 (13.3)	−11.4 (11.5)	−6.3 (20.7)	−2.4 (27.7)	0.5 (32.9)	5.2 (41.4)	8.0 (46.4)	8.4 (47.1)	4.8 (40.6)	0.6 (33.1)	−5.6 (21.9)	−9.5 (14.9)	−11.4 (11.5)
Average precipitation mm (inches)	23.6 (0.93)	19.8 (0.78)	28.0 (1.10)	40.0 (1.57)	40.2 (1.58)	28.5 (1.12)	16.5 (0.65)	17.8 (0.70)	27.3 (1.07)	34.0 (1.34)	34.0 (1.34)	19.1 (0.75)	328.8 (12.93)
Average precipitation days (≥ 1 mm)	4.4	3.7	4.8	5.6	6.2	4.0	2.6	2.2	3.2	5.3	5.6	4.5	52.1
Average snowy days	0.5	0.6	0.3	0.0	0.0	0.0	0.0	0.0	0.0	0.0	0.1	0.4	1.9
Average relative humidity (%)	74	66	59	56	52	48	46	48	55	65	72	76	60
Mean monthly sunshine hours	143	181	226	246	294	324	363	329	258	208	156	127	2,855
Percentage possible sunshine	48	60	61	62	65	71	79	77	69	60	52	44	62
Source: Agencia Estatal de Meteorología

=== Administrative subdivisions ===
Zaragoza is administratively divided into 15 urban districts and 14 rural neighborhoods:

#	Urban district
1	Casco Histórico
2	Centro
3	Delicias
4	Universidad
5	San José
6	Las Fuentes
7	La Almozara
8	Oliver–Valdefierro
9	Torrero
10	El Rabal
11	Actur–Rey Fernando
12	Casablanca
13	Santa Isabel
14	Miralbueno
15	Distrito Sur

== Demographics ==
Historical population
Year	Pop.	±%
1842	30,000	—
1857	63,399	+111.3%
1877	86,126	+35.8%
1887	94,538	+9.8%
1900	98,125	+3.8%
1910	109,635	+11.7%
1920	140,426	+28.1%
1930	162,121	+15.4%
1940	205,094	+26.5%
1950	244,015	+19.0%
1960	303,975	+24.6%
1970	469,366	+54.4%
1981	571,855	+21.8%
1991	594,394	+3.9%
2001	614,905	+3.5%
2011	678,115	+10.3%
2021	681,430	+0.5%
Source: INE

As of 2025, the population is 699,007, of which 48.0% are males, and 52.0% are females. Minors make up 15.9% of the population, and seniors make up 22.6%.

=== Religion ===
According to a survey carried out by the Centro de Investigaciones Sociológicas (CIS) in 2019 with a sample size of 300, 51.0% of the surveyed people described themselves as non-practising Catholic, 24.0% as practising Catholic, 6.7% as indifferent/non-believer, 5.0% as agnostic, 4.3% as atheist and 2.3% as "other religions", while a 6.7% did not answer.

=== Immigration ===
As of 2025, immigrants make up 19.4% of the population. The 5 largest foreign countries of birth are Colombia, Romania, Nicaragua, Ecuador, and Morocco.

Foreign population by country of birth (2025)
Country of birth	Population
Colombia	16,329
Romania	15,671
Nicaragua	12,521
Ecuador	10,988
Morocco	9,240
Venezuela	8,516
Peru	5,060
China	4,228
Senegal	3,835
Algeria	3,468
Dominican Republic	3,383
Cuba	3,020
Honduras	3,015
Argentina	2,869
Ghana	2,477

== Sights ==
Near the basilica on the banks of the Ebro are located the city hall, the Lonja (old currency exchange), La Seo (literally 'the See' in the Aragonese language) or Cathedral of San Salvador, a church built over the main mosque (partially preserved in the 11th-century north wall of the Parroquieta), with Romanesque apses from the 12th century; inside, the imposing hall church from the 15th to 16th centuries, the Baroque tower, and finally, with its famous Museum of Tapestries near the Roman ruins of forum and port city wall.

Also in the city centre, there is the palace of the Aljafería, conceived in the third quarter of the 11th century on behalf of the Hudid dynasty, featuring in its interior one of the most rich and complex instances of ornamental Islamic art, either Western or Eastern. It currently serves as the site of the Aragonese parliament.

The churches of San Pablo, Santa María Magdalena and San Gil Abad were built in the 14th century, but the towers may be old minarets dating from the 11th century; San Miguel (14th century); Santiago (San Ildefonso) and the Fecetas monastery are Baroque with Mudéjar ceilings of the 17th century. All the churches are Mudéjar monuments that comprise a World Heritage Site.

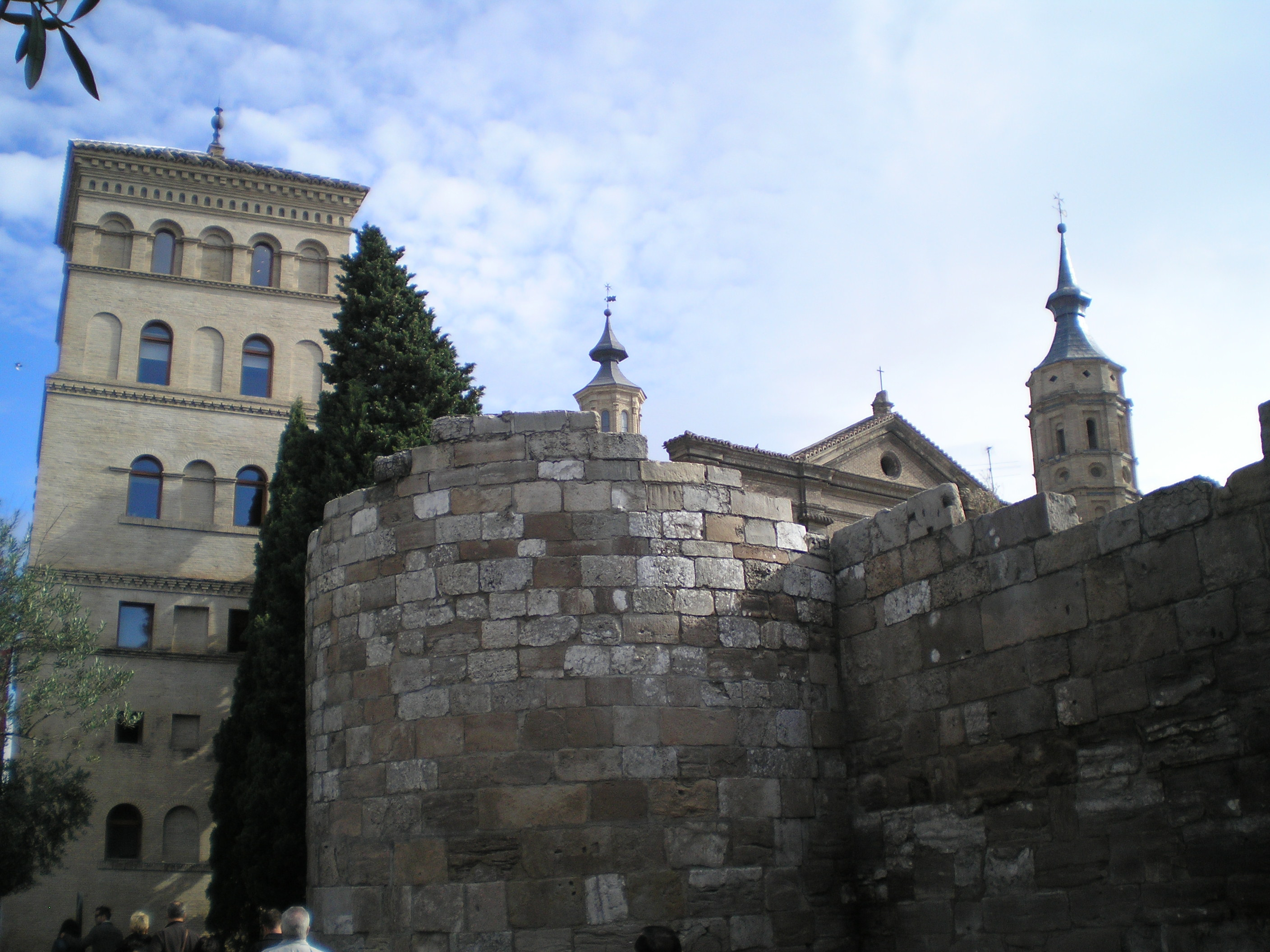
The Roman walls

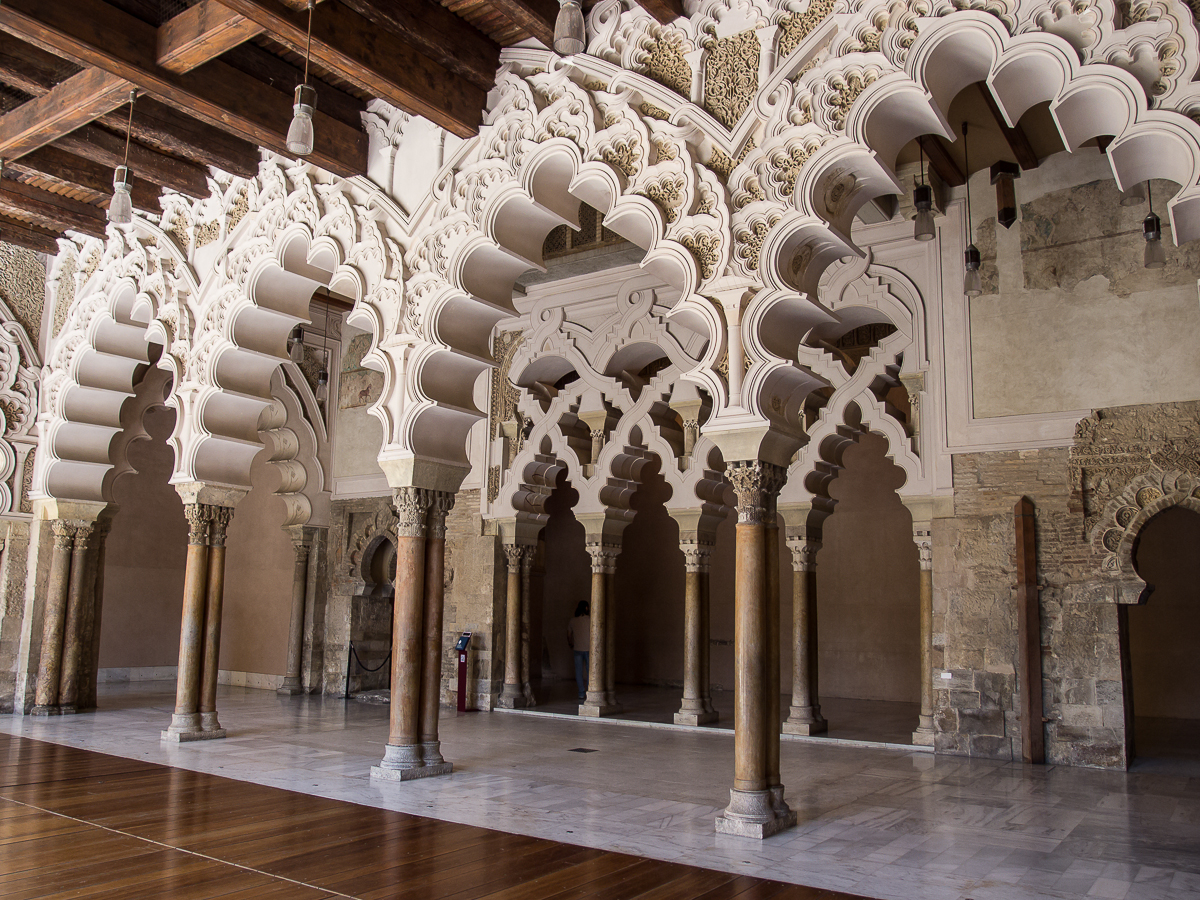
Interior of the Aljafería

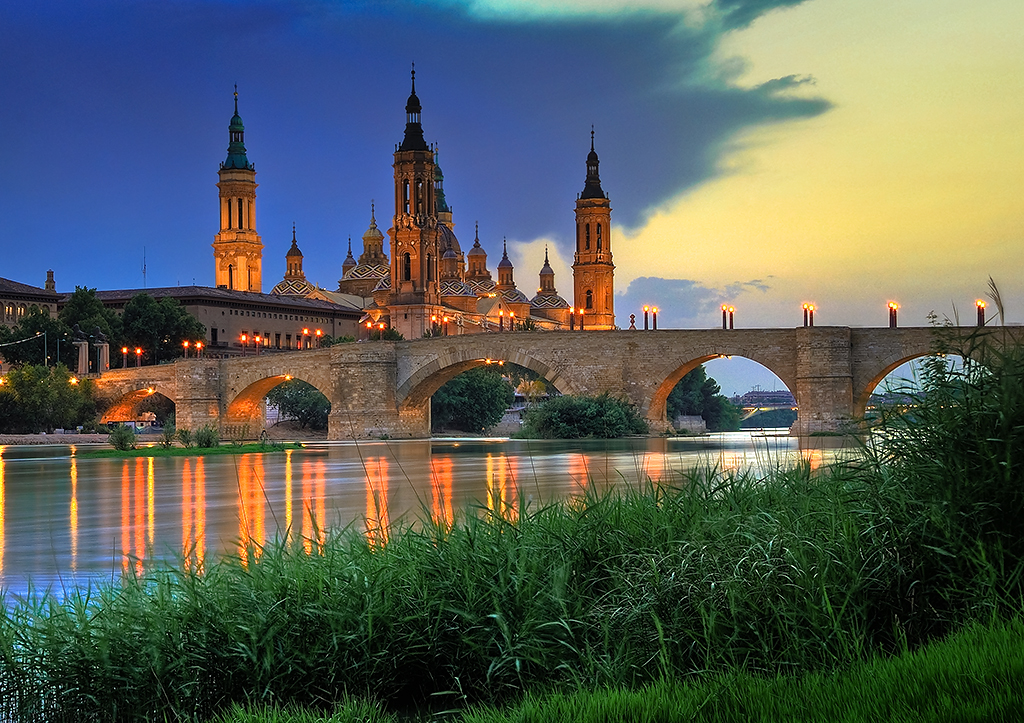
Cathedral-Basilica of Our Lady of the Pillar and the Puente de Piedra bridge on the Ebro River

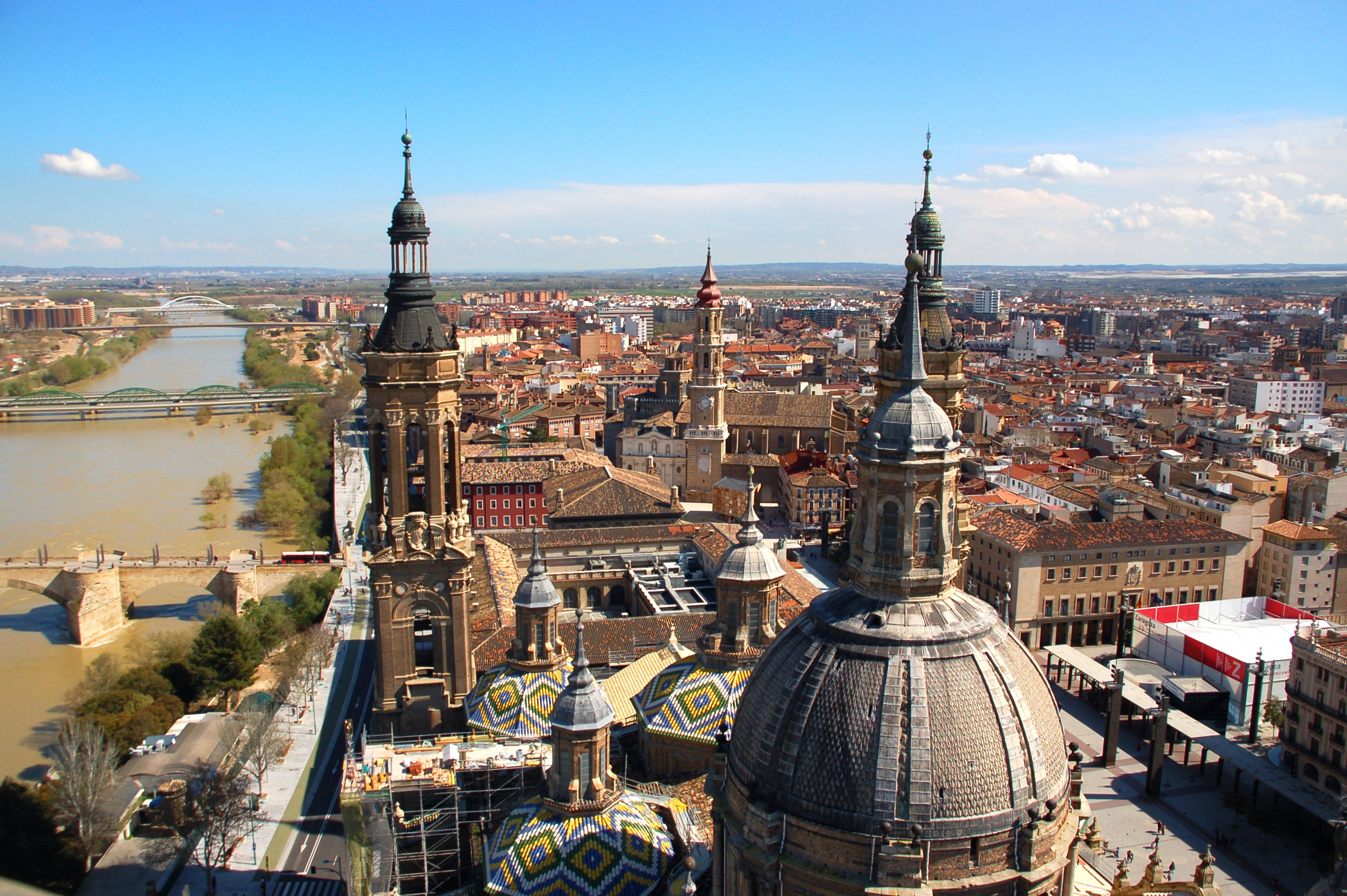
View from the Cathedral

Other important sights are the stately houses and palaces in the city, mainly of the 16th century: palaces of the count of Morata or Luna (Audiencia), Deán, Torrero (colegio de Arquitectos), Don Lope or Real Maestranza, count of Sástago, count of Argillo (today the Pablo Gargallo museum), archbishop, etc. On 14 June 2008, the site of Expo 2008 opened its doors to the public. The exhibition ran until 14 September.

=== Other sights ===
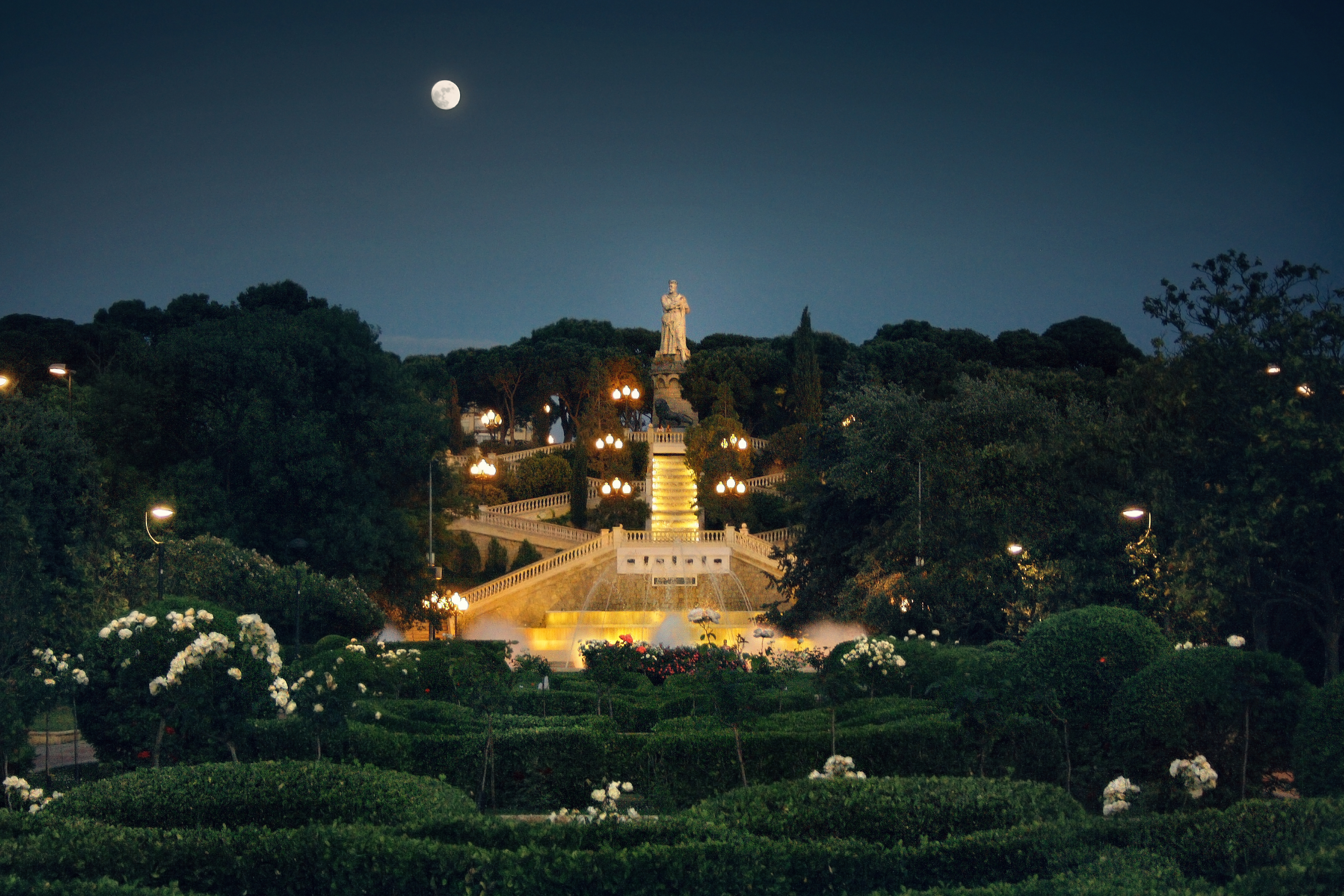
Labordeta Grand Park

- Puente de Piedra
- San Ildefonso church
- Santa Engracia Monastery
- Fuente de la Hispanidad

Museums in Zaragoza are:

- Museum of Fine Arts Zaragoza, with paintings by early Aragonese artists, 15th century, and by El Greco, Ribera and Goya.
- Museo Goya - Colección Ibercaja - Museo Camón Aznar with works by Rubens, Rembrandt, Van Dyck, Velazquez and Goya to Renoir, Manet and Sorolla.

== Culture ==
Christianity took root in Zaragoza at an early date. According to legend, St. Mary appeared miraculously to Saint James the Great in Zaragoza in the first century, standing on a pillar. This apparition is commemorated by a famous Catholic basilica called Nuestra Señora del Pilar ('Our Lady of the Pillar').

The Aragonese language, in decline for centuries and restricted mostly to northern Aragon, has recently attracted more people in the region. Thus, nowadays, in Zaragoza, up to 7,000 people speak Aragonese.

=== Festivals ===
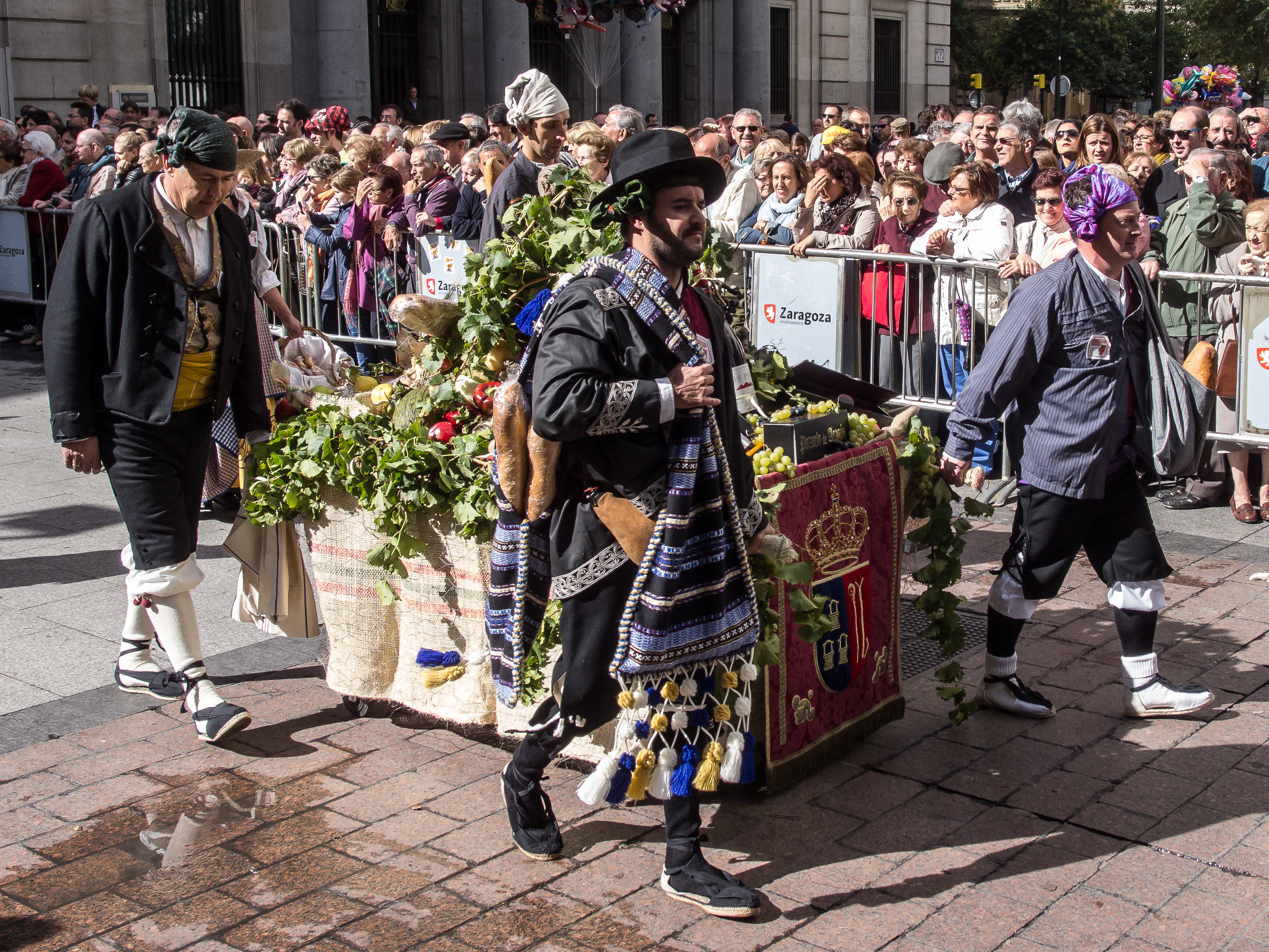
Offering of Fruits at the Fiestas del Pilar

The annual Fiestas del Pilar lasts for nine days, with its main day on 12 October. This date also coincides with Spain's national holiday, El Día de la Hispanidad (Day of Hispanicity), which celebrates Spain's cultural and historical ties with Hispanic America. October 12 also corresponds to the arrival of Christopher Columbus in the Americas.

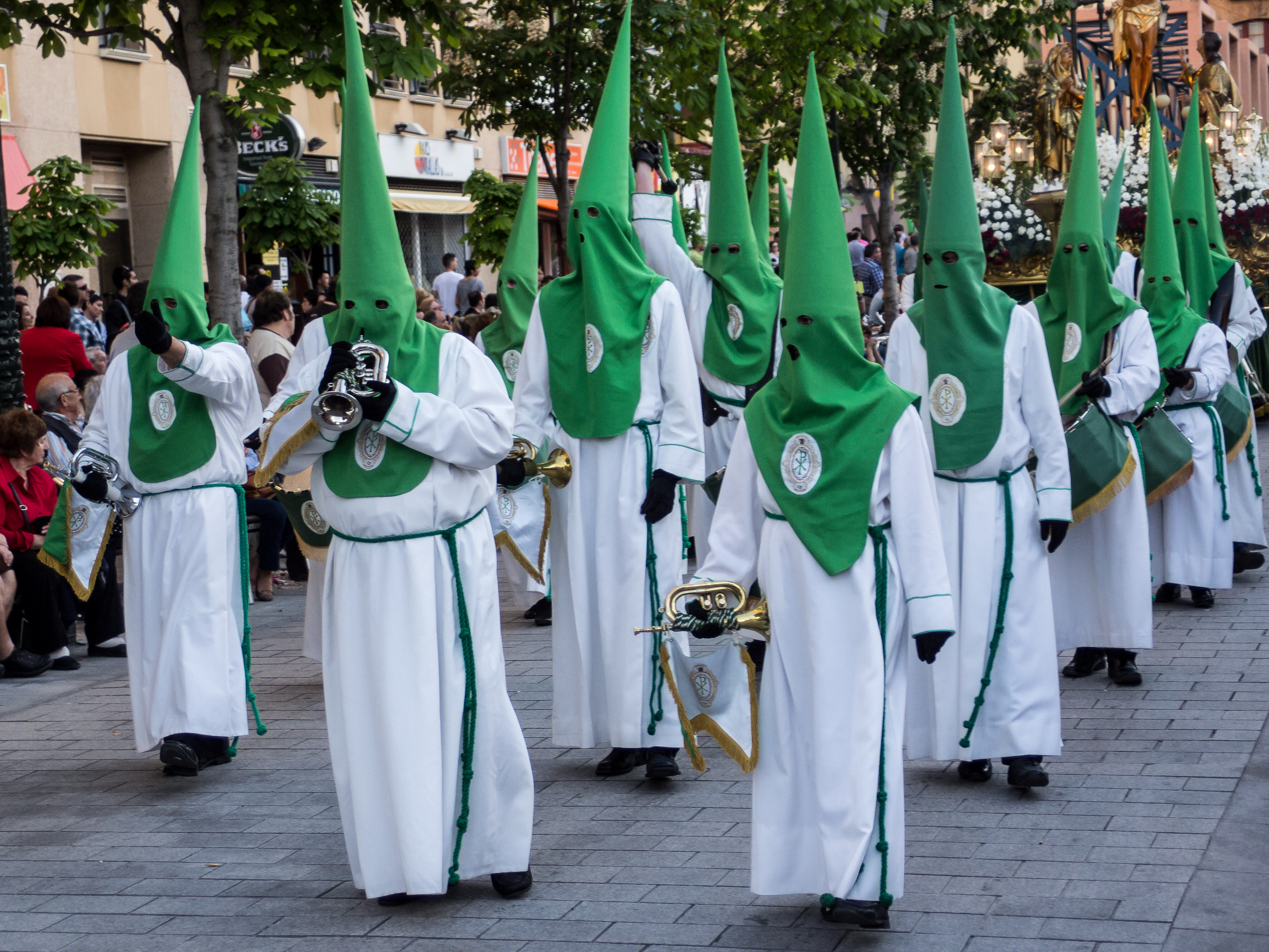
Semana Santa in Zaragoza

There are many activities during the festival, from the massively attended pregon (opening speech) to the final fireworks display over the Ebro; they also include marching bands, dances such as jota aragonesa (the most popular folk music dance), a procession of gigantes y cabezudos, concerts, exhibitions, vaquillas, bullfights, fairground amusements, and fireworks. Some of the most important events are the Ofrenda de Flores, or Flower Offering to St. Mary of the Pillar, on 12 October, when an enormous surface resembling a cloak for St. Mary is covered with flowers, and the Ofrenda de Frutos on 13 October, when all the autonomous communities of Spain offer their typical regional dishes to St. Mary and donate them to soup kitchens.

Holy Week in Zaragoza, although not as elaborate an affair as its Andalusian or Bajo Aragón counterparts, has several processions passing through the city centre every day with dramatic sculptures, black-dressed praying women and hundreds of hooded people playing drums. It has been a Festival of International Tourist Interest since 2014.

== Economy ==
World Trade Center Zaragoza

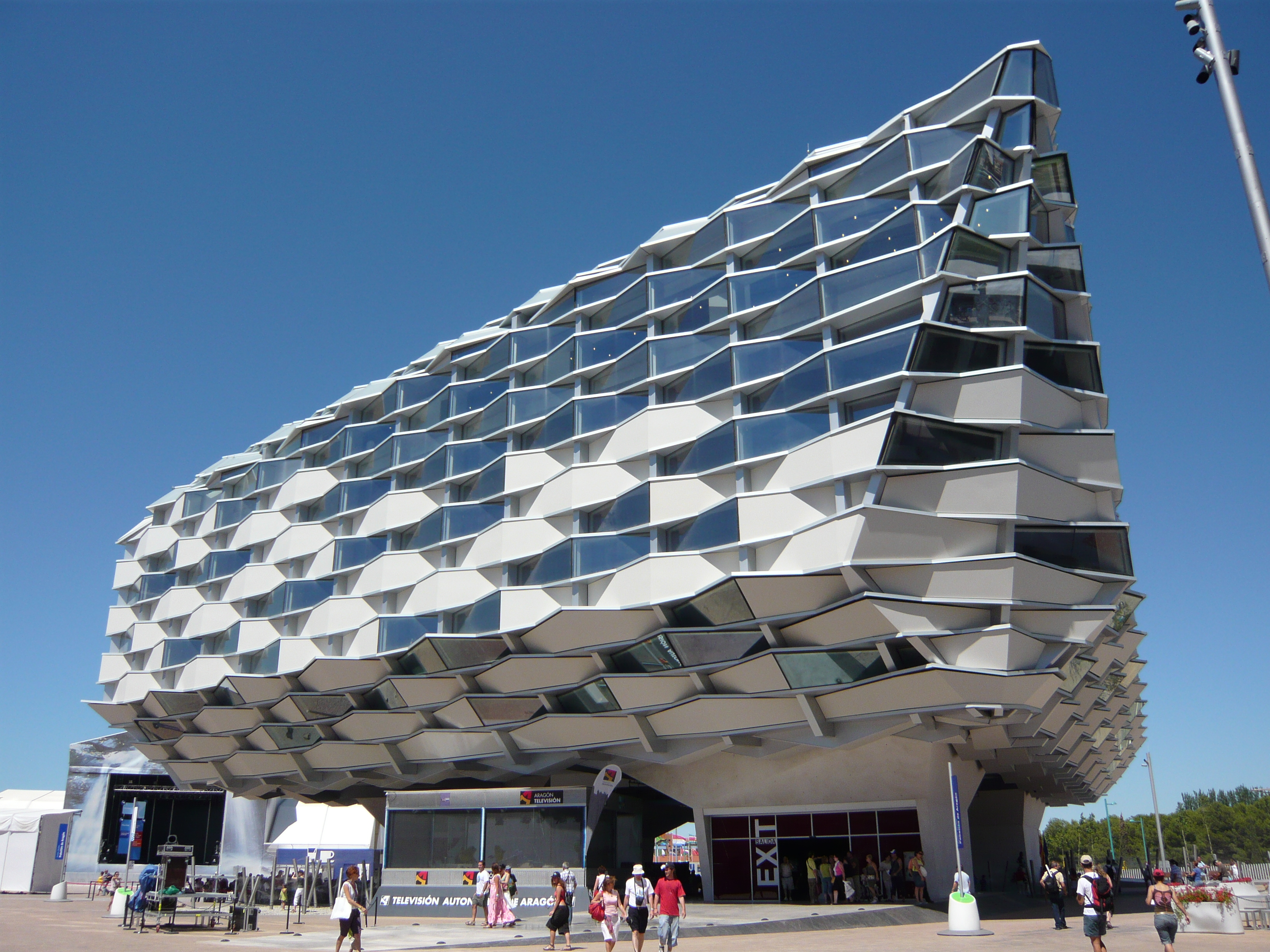
Pavilion of Aragon in the Expo 2008

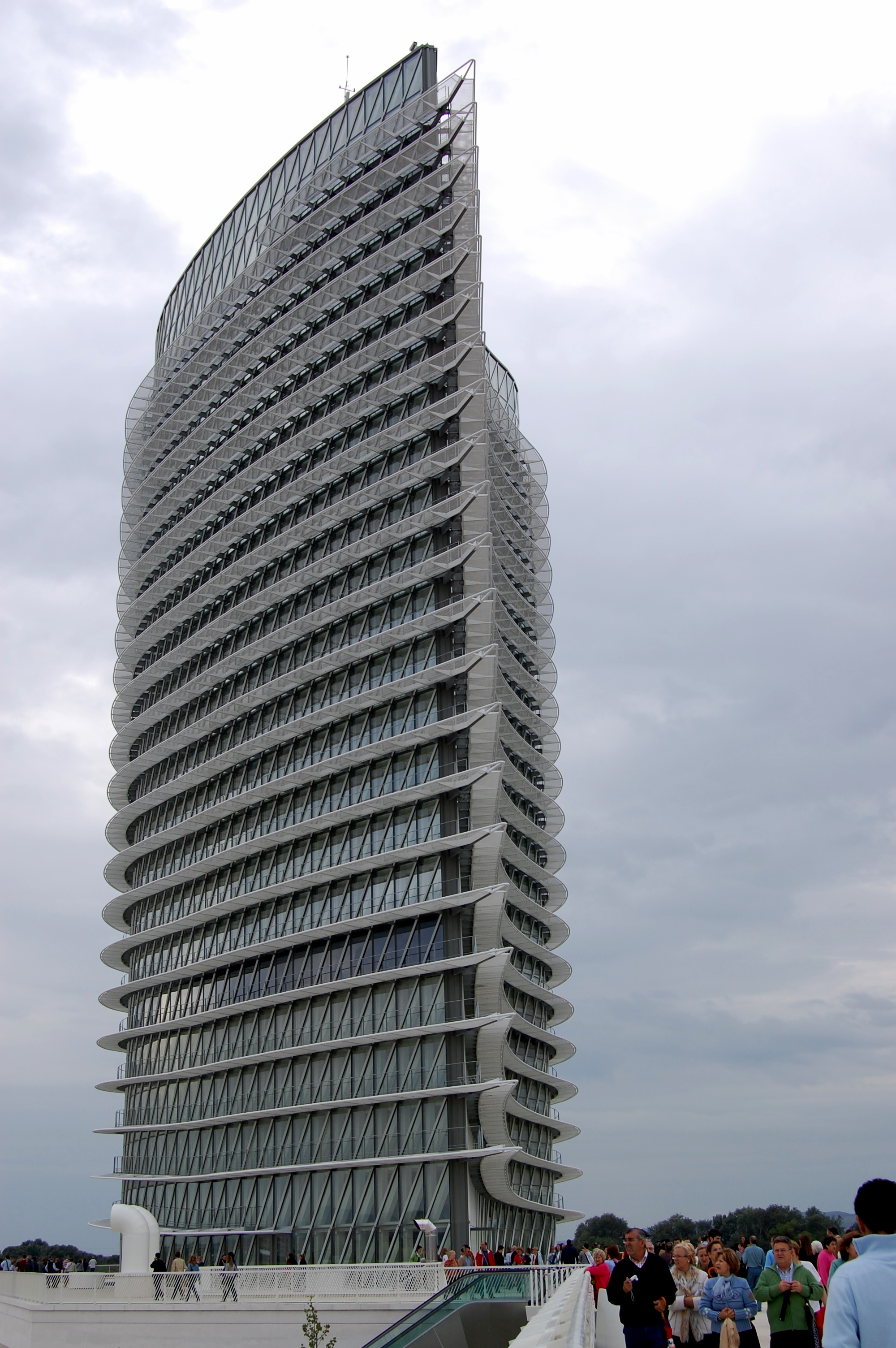
Torre del Agua at the Expo 2008 site

An Opel factory was opened in 1982 in Figueruelas, a small village nearby. The automotive industry is a main pillar of the regional economy along with Balay, which manufactures household appliances; CAF, which builds railway rolling stock for both the national and international markets; SAICA and Torraspapel in the stationery sector; and various other local companies, such as Pikolin, Lacasa, and Imaginarium SA.

The city's economy benefited from projects like the Expo 2008, the official World's Fair, whose theme was water and sustainable development, held between 14 June and 14 September 2008, Plataforma Logística de Zaragoza (PLAZA), and the Parque Tecnológico de Reciclado (PTR). Furthermore, since December 2003, it has been a city through which the AVE high-speed rail travels. Currently, Zaragoza Airport is a major cargo hub in the Iberian Peninsula, behind only Madrid, Barcelona, and Lisbon.

Zaragoza is home to a Spanish Air and Space Force base, which was shared with the U.S. Air Force until 1992. In English, the base was known as Zaragoza Air Base. The Spanish Air Force maintained a McDonnell Douglas F/A-18 Hornet wing at the base. No American flying wings (with the exception of a few KC-135s) were permanently based there, but it served as a training base for American fighter squadrons across Europe. It also hosts the main Spanish Army academy, Academia General Militar, a number of brigades at San Gregorio, and other garrisons.

== Education ==
The University of Zaragoza is based in the city. As one of the oldest universities in Spain and a major research and development centre, this public university awards all the highest academic degrees in dozens of fields. Zaragoza is also home to the MIT-Zaragoza International Logistics Program, a unique partnership between MIT, the Government of Aragon and the University of Zaragoza.

There is a French international primary and secondary school, Lycée Français Molière de Saragosse.

== Transport ==
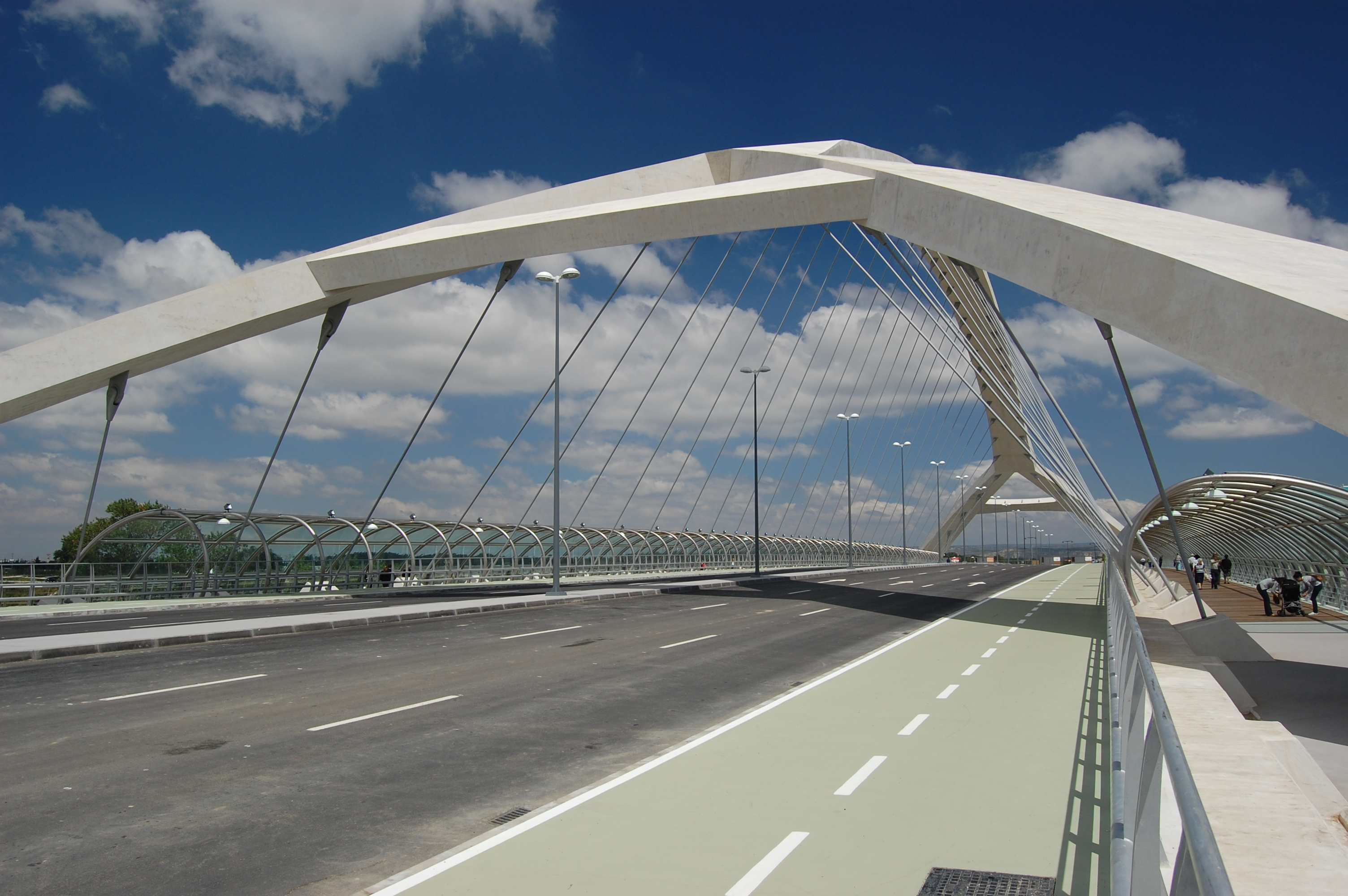
Zaragoza's Third Millennium Bridge spans the Ebro and is the world's largest concrete tied-arch bridge, with six traffic lanes, two bike lanes, and two glass-enclosed walkways for pedestrians.

=== Roads ===
Zaragoza tram in Paseo de la Independencia

The city is connected by motorway with the main cities in central and northern Spain, including Madrid, Barcelona, Valencia, and Bilbao, all of which are located about 300 kilometres (200 miles) from Zaragoza.

=== Buses ===
The city has a network of buses which is controlled by the Urban Buses of Zaragoza (AUZSA). The network consists of 31 regular lines (two of them circle lines), two scheduled routes, six shuttle buses (one free), and seven night buses operating on Fridays, Saturdays and other festivities. Zaragoza also has an interurban bus network operated by Transport Consortium Zaragoza Area (CTAZ) that operates 17 regular lines.

=== Bicycle ===
Zaragoza's bicycle lanes facilitate non-motorised travel and help cyclists to avoid running into pedestrians and motor vehicles. The city council also has a public bicycle-hire scheme, the bizi zaragoza, which has an annual charge.

=== Tram ===
The first line of the Zaragoza tram (Valdespartera-Parque Goya) is fully operational.

=== Railway ===
Zaragoza is a part of the Spanish high-speed railway operated by Renfe, AVE, which connects Madrid, Lleida, Tarragona, Barcelona and Figueres via high-speed rail. Madrid can be reached in 75 minutes, and Barcelona in approximately 90 minutes. The central station is Zaragoza–Delicias railway station, which serves both railway lines and coaches. In addition to long-distance railway lines and the high-speed trains, Zaragoza has a network of commuter trains operated by Renfe called Cercanías Zaragoza.

=== Airport ===
Zaragoza Airport

Zaragoza Airport is located in the Garrapinillos neighbourhood, 10 kilometres from the city centre.

It is a major commercial airport, its freight traffic surpassing that of Barcelona El Prat in 2012, and serves as the home of the Spanish Air Force's 15th Group. It was also used by NASA as a contingency landing site for the Space Shuttle in the case of a Transoceanic Abort Landing (TAL).

=== Public transportation statistics ===
The average amount of time people spend commuting with public transit in Zaragoza, for example to and from work, on a weekday is 48 minutes. 9% of public transit riders ride for more than two hours every day. The average amount of time people wait at a stop or station for public transit is 11 minutes, while 12% of riders wait for over 20 minutes on average every day. The average distance people usually ride in a single trip with public transit is 4.2 km (2.6 mi), while 5% travel over 12 km (7.5 mi) in a single direction.

== Sport ==
=== Football ===
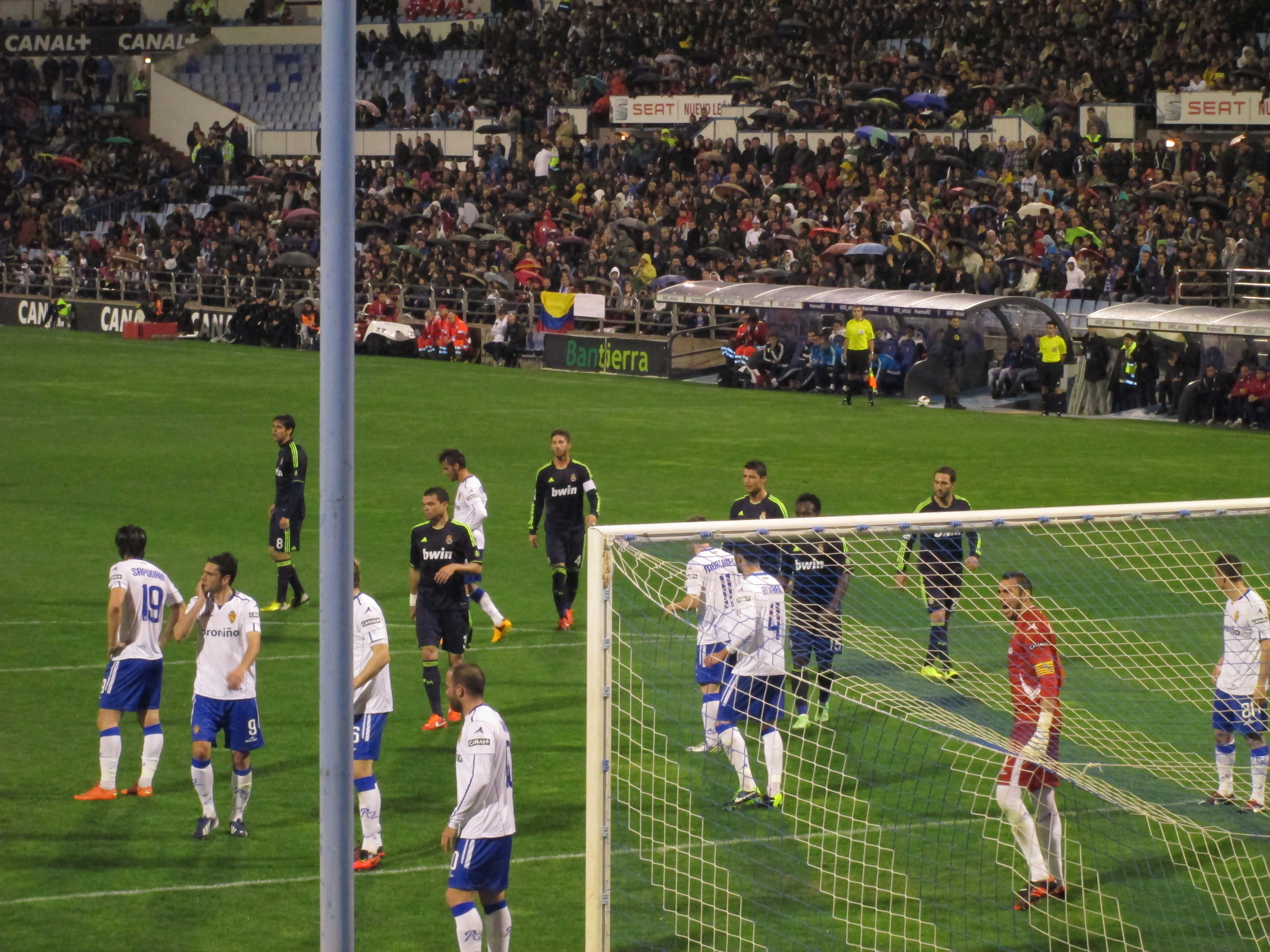
A 2013 La Liga fixture in La Romareda vs Real Madrid

Zaragoza's main football team, Real Zaragoza, plays in the Segunda División. Founded on 18 March 1932, its home games are played at La Romareda, which seats 34,596 spectators. The club has spent the majority of its history in La Liga. One of the most remarkable events in the team's recent history is the winning of the former UEFA Cup Winners' Cup in 1995. The team has also won the Spanish National Cup, Copa del Rey, six times: 1965, 1966, 1986, 1994, 2001 and 2004 and an Inter-Cities Fairs Cup (1964). A government survey in 2007 found that 2.7% of the Spanish population support the club, making them the seventh-most supported in the country.

Zaragoza's second football team is CD Ebro. Founded in 1942, it plays in Segunda División B – Group 2, holding home games at Campo Municipal de Fútbol La Almozara, which has a capacity of 1,000 seats.

Zaragoza CFF is a Spanish women's football team from Zaragoza playing in Segunda Federación Femenina, that once played in the top división.

Zaragoza was one of the Spanish cities which hosted the FIFA World Cup 1982. Three matches were played at La Romareda.

Its current stadium (La Romareda) will be demolished and a new one will be built, as Zaragoza is expected to be one of the eleven Spanish cities to host the FIFA World Cup 2030.

=== Basketball ===
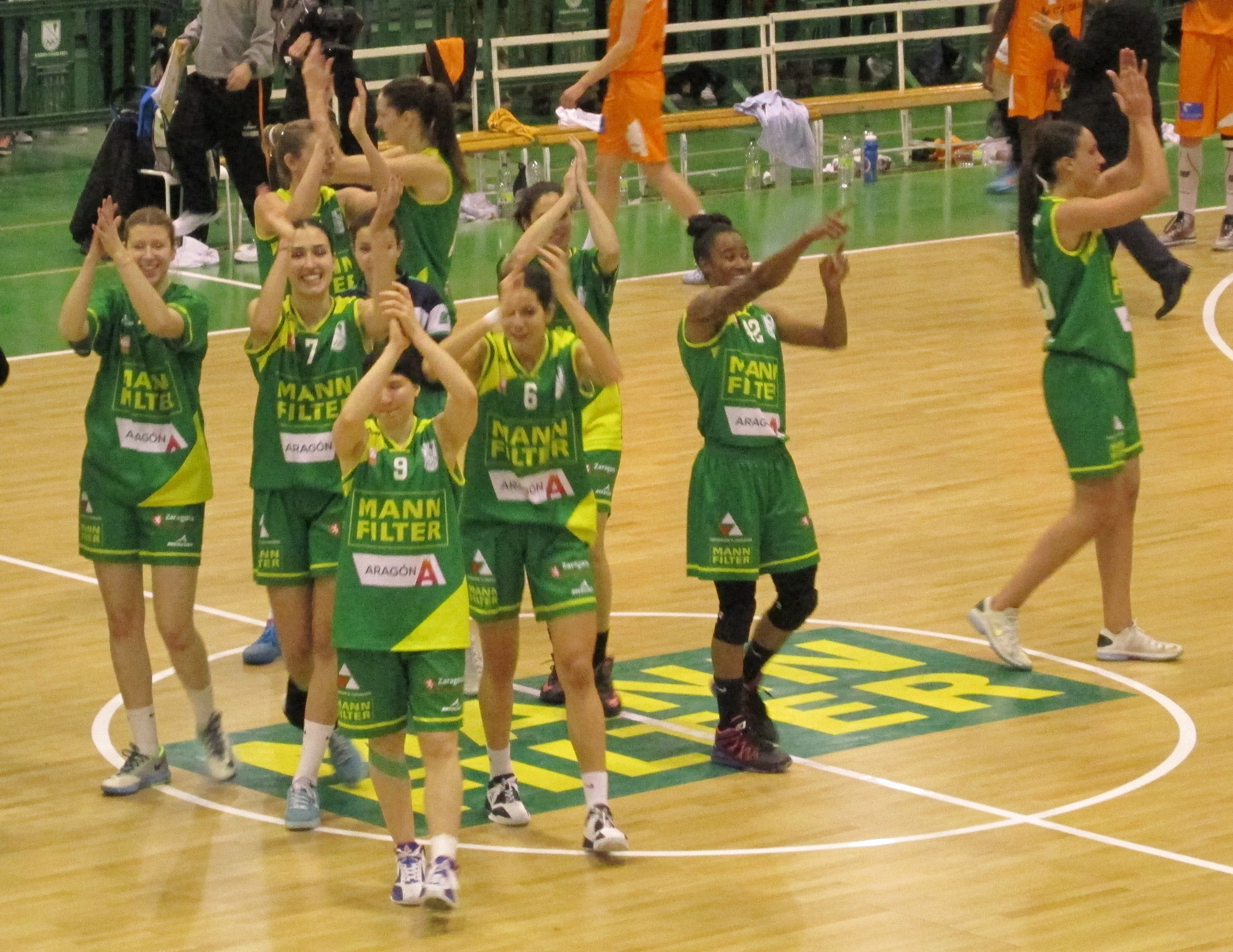
Stadium Casablanca celebrating a win in 2015

The main basketball team, Basket Zaragoza, known as Casademont Zaragoza for sponsorship reasons, plays in the Liga ACB. The Basket Zaragoza women's team also plays at the highest level in Spain, being the current finalist of the Liga Femenina Endesa. They play their home games at the Pabellón Príncipe Felipe with a capacity of 10,744. This pavilion will be the final venue for EuroLeague Women from 2025 to 2027.

Stadium Casablanca, a.k.a. Mann Filter for sponsorship reasons, is the Spanish women's basketball club from Zaragoza that plays in the Primera Division.

=== Futsal ===
The main futsal team, is Dlink Zaragoza, plays in the LNFS Primera División. They play at the Pabellón Siglo XXI with a capacity of 2,600.

=== Other sports ===
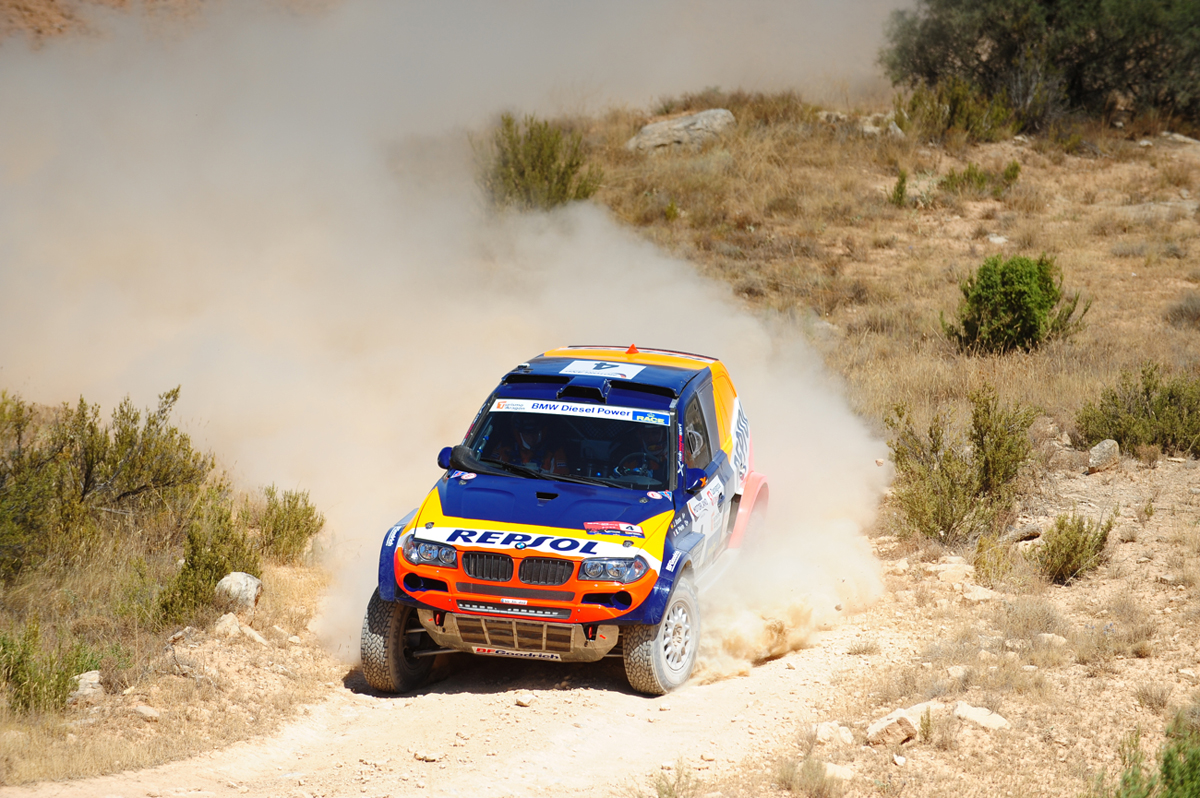
Nani Roma Baja España 2009

Zaragoza's handball team, BM Aragón, plays in the Liga ASOBAL.

The Spanish Baja or Baja Aragon is a Rally raid event held in the region of Aragon in northern Spain. This event was launched in 1983, and chose the desert of Monegros because of the scenery and availability of service infrastructure in Zaragoza.

Zaragoza was strongly associated with Jaca in its failed bid for the 2014 Winter Olympics.

There are three Rugby Union teams playing in the regional league:

1. Ibero Club de Rugby Zaragoza
2. Fénix Club de Rugby
3. Club Deportivo Universitario de Rugby

In June, 2025, Zaragoza will host the ITSF World Cup and World Championships, an international foosball tournament held by the International Table Soccer Federation.

A permanent feature built for Expo 2008 is the pump-powered artificial whitewater course El Canal de Aguas Bravas.

== Notable people ==
- Abraham Abulafia (1240–1291), founder of the school of "Prophetic Kabbalah"
- Alonso Fernández de Heredia (died 19 March 1782), Captain General and governor of Honduras (1747), Florida (1751–1758), Yucatán (in modern-day Mexico; 1758–?), the Captaincy General of Guatemala (1761–1771) and Nicaragua (1761–1771).
- Levi ibn al-Tabban (12th century), Jewish grammarian and poet
- Hasdai Crescas, a Jewish philosopher and author of Or Adonai
- Amaral (band) (established 1992), popular musical band in Spain and America.
- Félix Anaut (born 1944), painter
- Avempace (1085–1138), polymath
- Bahya ben Joseph ibn Paquda (1050–1120), Jewish philosopher and the author of Chovot HaLevavot
- Ramón Ferreñac (1763–1832), composer
- José Luis Gil (born 1957), actor
- Alejandra Andreu (born 1990), Miss International 2008
- Aday Mara (born 2005), basketball player for the Oklahoma City Thunder.
- Luis de Horruytiner (? – ?), governor of Spanish Florida (1633 – 1638), and viceroy of Sardinia
- José Antonio Jiménez Salas (1916 – 2000), geotechnical engineer, professor of civil engineering, and academic member of the Spanish Royal Academy of Sciences
- Mapi León (born 1995), footballer for the Spain national team
- David Loera (born 1998), Spanish-born soccer player
- Eliezer Mayenda (born 2005), footballer for Sunderland AFC
- Rafael Navarro (born 8 October 1940), photographer
- Salma Paralluelo (born 2003), footballer for the Spain national team
- Sebastián Pozas (1876–1946), military officer
- Al-Saraqusti (died 1143), twelfth century Andalusi lexicographer, poet, philologist
- María del Pilar Sinués de Marco (1835-1893), prolific 19th-century writer
- Zoe Rosinach Pedrol (1894–1973), Zaragoza pharmacist and the first Spanish woman to earn a doctorate in Pharmacy
- Irene Vallejo, writer
- Dino Valls (born 1959), painter.
- Ignacio García Velilla (born 1967), film director
- José María Vigil (born 1946), theologian
- St. Vincent of Saragossa (died 304), Christian proto-martyr of Spain

== International relations ==
=== Twin towns – sister cities ===
Zaragoza is twinned with:

- Pau, France, 1960
- Zaragoza, Guatemala, 1976
- Biarritz, France, 1977
- La Plata, Argentina, 1990
- Ponce, Puerto Rico, United States, 1993
- León, Nicaragua, 2002
- Bethlehem, Palestine, 2003
- Óbuda-Békásmegyer, Hungary, 2004
- Tijuana, Mexico, 2005
- Móstoles, Spain, 2005
- Coimbra, Portugal, 2005
- La Paz, Bolivia, 2008
- Zamboanga City, Philippines, 2008
- Dalian, Liaoning, China, 2008
- Yulin, Guangxi, China, 2008
- Skopje, North Macedonia, 2008
- Mdina, Malta, 2008
- Córdoba, Argentina, 2008
- Atizapan, Mexico, 2009
- Cúcuta, Colombia, 2010
- Yoro, Honduras, 2012
- Campinas, Brazil, 2012
- Zaragoza, El Salvador, 2014
- Canfranc, Spain, 2015

Zaragoza has special bilateral collaboration agreements with:

- Mostar, Bosnia and Herzegovina, 2001
- Tirana, Albania, 2002
- Ploiești, Romania, 2004
- Toulouse, France, 2008
- Zapopan, Mexico, 2010

== See also ==
- Crown of Aragon
- Roman Catholic Archdiocese of Zaragoza
- Third Millennium Bridge
- Caesaraugusta
- List of municipalities in Zaragoza
- Loggia of Zaragoza
