= Zaragoza City Hall =

Coordinates: 41.6561°N 0.8775°W

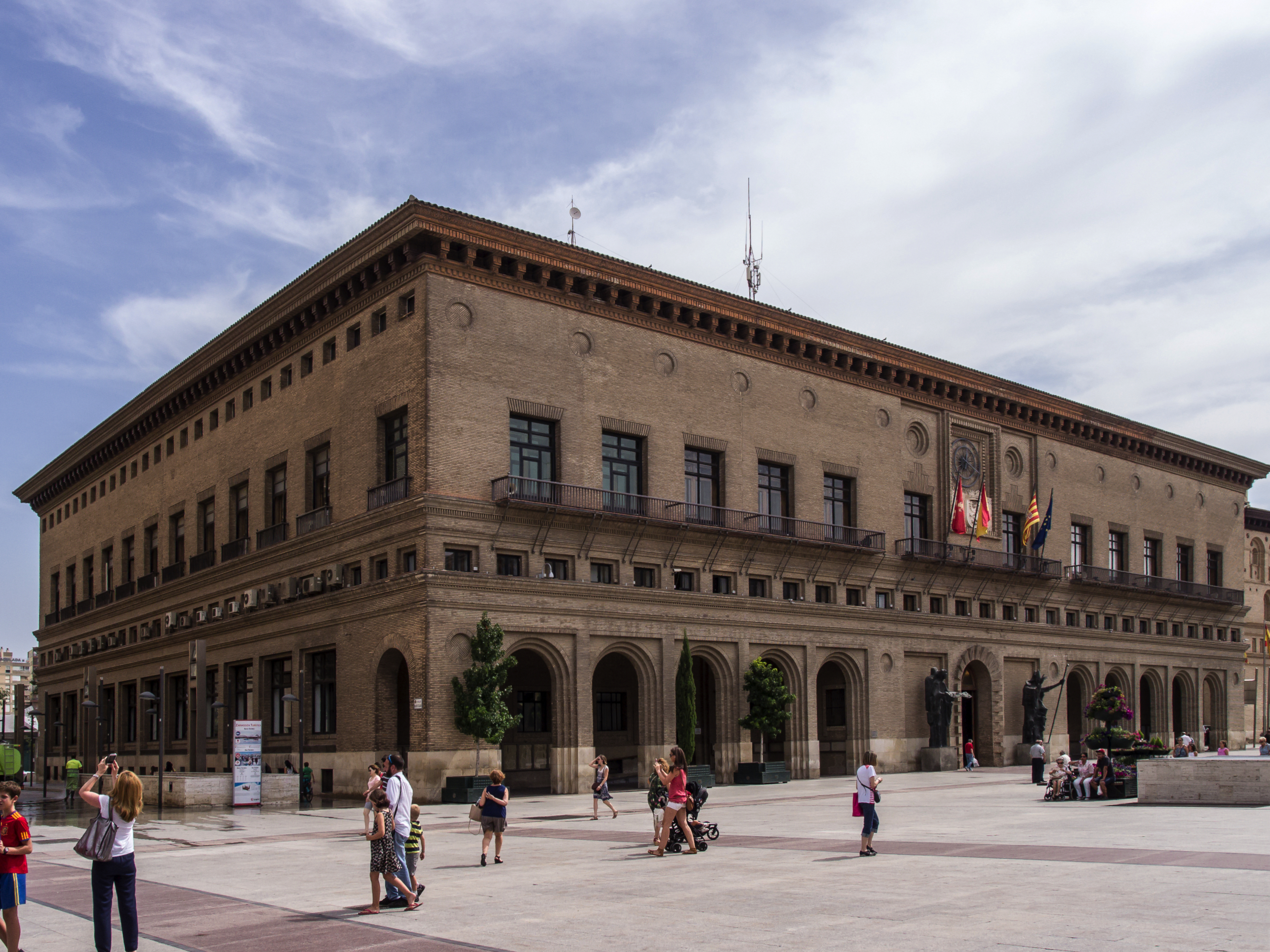
Main facade

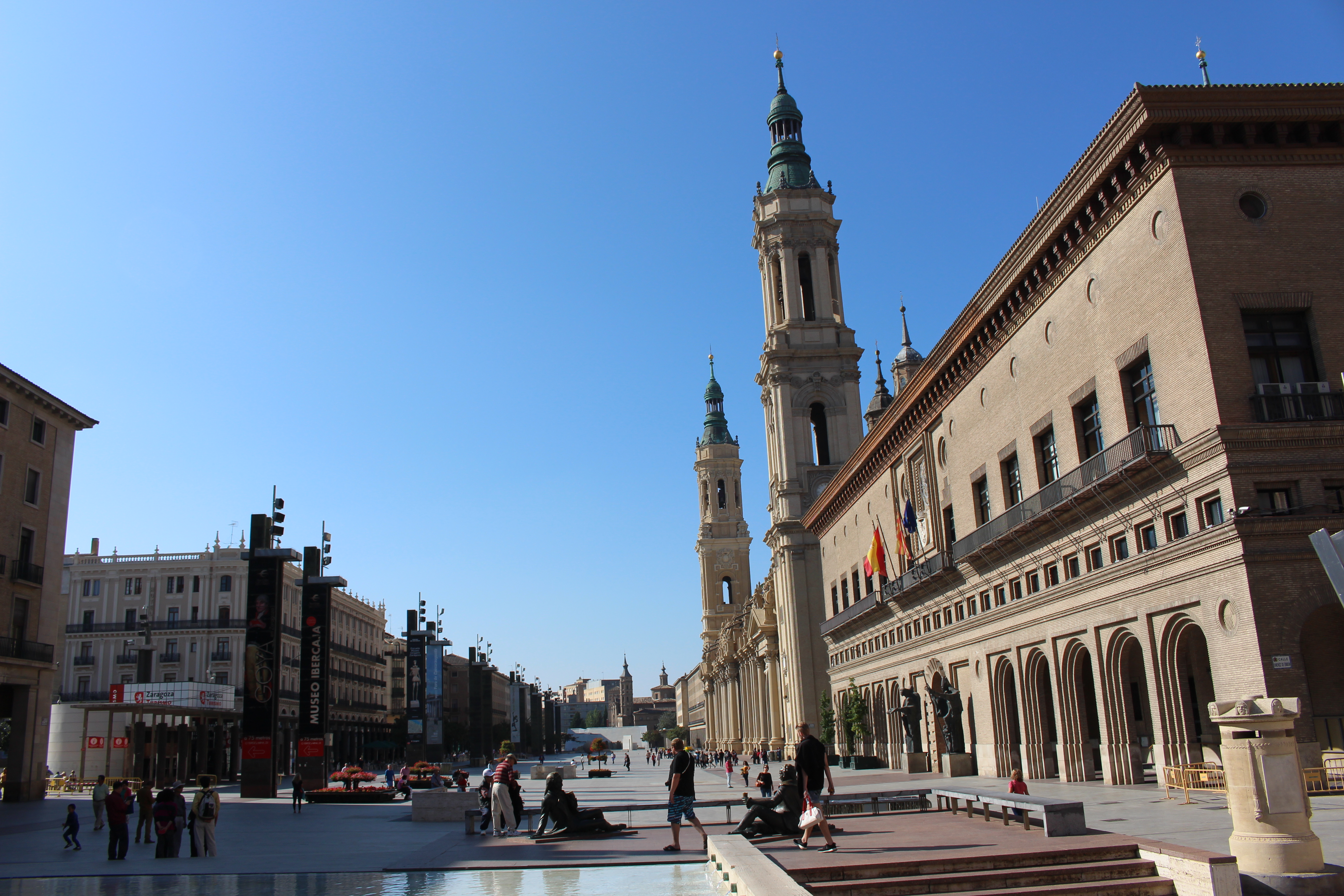
Panoramic view of the Plaza of Our Lady of the Pillar. The city hall is on the right in the foreground, with the Cathedral-Basilica of Our Lady of the Pillar rising behind it

Zaragoza City Hall (Spanish: Casa consistorial de Zaragoza) is the seat of the city council in Zaragoza, Aragon, Spain. It is located in the Plaza of Our Lady of the Pillar, and is built in the Renaissance Revival style.

The city council was held from the Middle Ages in the Casas del Puente, named for their proximity to a bridge over the river Ebro. The buildings, which were indistinct from their neighbours, were demolished in the early 20th century. The council had held the Dominican Convent since 1837 due to laws of confiscation. It then based itself there from 1912, due to the deterioration of the previous site.

A competition was held, and the design by Alberto Acha, Mariano Nasarre and Ricardo Magdalena Gayán won in 1941. In 1945, the plan was set for the foundation and frame at a price of 5 million Spanish pesetas, and work began on 2 January 1946. Construction halted in 1951 due to exhausted funds, and remained untouched until 1954 when the mayor ordered the facade to be built for the Marian Congress due to be held in the city, at a cost of 2.4 million. The bill totalled 18 million when it opened on 6 September 1965. A reason for the costs and length of construction was that it was not built by large companies, but by guilds of master craftsmen.

The city hall is also used as an art gallery.
