= José Antonio Jiménez Salas =

Spanish civil engineer (1916–2000)

- Born: 10 March 1916; Zaragoza, Spain
- Died: 15 November 2000 (aged 84); Madrid, Spain
- Education: Escuela Técnica Superior de Ingenieros de Caminos, Canales y Puertos
- Awards: Grand Cross of the Order of Civil Merit (1974); Medal of Honour for the Promotion of Invention (Spanish: Medalla de Honor al Fomento de la Invención) (1994)
- Scientific career
- Fields: Civil Engineering
- Workplaces: Sociedad Española de Mecánica del Suelo e Ingeniería Geotécnica; Sociedad Española de Mecánica de Rocas

José Antonio Jiménez Salas (10 March 1916 – 15 November 2000) was a Spanish professor of civil engineering and an elected academic of the Spanish Royal Academy of Sciences.

== Life and career ==
Jiménez Salas was born in Zaragoza in 1916. He attended a Marist Brothers (Spanish: Congregación de los Hermanos Maristas) school in Zaragoza, before completing his initial education at IES San Isidro after his family moved to Madrid. After completing his high school studies, he studied at the School of Civil Engineering (Spanish: Escuela Técnica Superior de Ingenieros de Caminos, Canales y Puertos, ETSICCP) in Madrid. His studies were interrupted by the outbreak of the Spanish Civil War in which he fought after enlisting in Zaragoza in 1936. He returned to his studies after the war and graduated as a Civil Engineer in 1942, as the second-placed student in a class of eighteen.

Between 1942 and 1943, he studied Applied Geology and Soil Mechanics at the Technical University of Munich and TU Wien on a scholarship, returning to Spain in 1943. After returning to Spain, he was assigned to the Spanish High Commissioner in Morocco until 1945, when he became Professor of Bridges, Structures and Geotechnics at the ETSICCP, before becoming a Senior Professor of Geotechnics and Foundations. Amongst his research works, he published a study on the compressibility of clays, which he presented at the International Congress of Soil Mechanics in Zurich in 1953.

In addition to his work in geotechnical engineering, he was heavily involved with the creation of the Spanish Society of Soil Mechanics, and is notable as the principal author of a series of books on geotechnical engineering and foundations, published in three volumes between 1971 and 1980:

- The first volume, Geotecnia y Cimientos I (English: Geotechnics and Foundations I), was published in two editions, the first in 1971 and a second in 1975. At 466 pages long, it focused on the properties of soils and rocks, and was well received by students and geotechnical engineering practitioners in Spain and other Spanish-speaking countries.
- Geotecnia y Cimientos II: Released in two editions (1976 and 1981), this 1187-page volume addresses the mechanics of soil and rocks, offering calculation methods and in-depth treatment of elasticity, plasticity, and other foundational concepts in geotechnics.
- Geotecnia y Cimientos III: Published in 1980 across two volumes, totalling 2115 pages, this work involved contributions from 18 authors who had worked with Jiménez Salas. It covers the practical application of the theoretical approaches of the preceding two volumes, including foundation engineering techniques such as piling and deep foundations, ground anchors, and other geotechnical engineering processes.

In 1982, he joined the Spanish Royal Academy of Sciences with an acceptance speech entitled "Spanish scientific contributions to Geotechnics". In the same year, Jiménez Salas founded the International Course on Soil Mechanics and Foundation Engineering at the Centro de Estudios y Experimentación de Obras Públicas, which was mainly aimed at educating postgraduate students from Latin America. The course has subsequently developed into a Master's Degree in Soil Mechanics and Geotechnical Engineering. He received the Grand Cross of the Order of Civil Merit in 1974, and the Medal of Honour for the Promotion of Invention (Spanish: Medalla de Honor al Fomento de la Invención) from the Spanish Government in 1994. He died in Madrid in November 2000. A plaza in the Valdebebas neighbourhood of Madrid was subsequently named for him. His son, Javier Jiménez Sendín, is a professor of engineering and a notable researcher in the field of fluid mechanics and turbulence.

== Selected bibliography ==
- Jiménez Salas, J.A. (1945) Notas sobre Mecánica de Suelo [Notes on Soil Mechanics], Revista de Obras Públicas (ROP), Vol. I, Nos. 2764-2766, pp. 341-350, 400-415, 471-481.
- Jiménez Salas, J.A. (1951) La Mecánica del Suelo y sus aplicaciones a la ingeniería [Soil Mechanics and its Engineering Applications], Madrid: Dossat.
- Jiménez Salas, J.A. and de Justo Alpañes, J.L. (1971) Geotecnia y cimientos [Geotechnics and Foundations], Spain: Editorial Rueda.
- Jiménez Salas, J.A., de Justo Alpañes, J.L., Serrano González, A. (1976) Geotecnia y Cimientos II: Mecánica del Suelo y de las Rocas [Geotechnics and Foundations II: Mechanics of Soil and Rocks], Madrid: Rueda J.M., Ediciones, S.A.
- Jiménez Salas, J.A. and de Cañizo Perate, L. (1980) Geotecnia y Cimientos III: Cimentaciones, Excavaciones y Aplicaciones [Geotechnics and Foundations III: Foundations, Excavations, and Applications], Madrid: Rueda J.M., Ediciones, S.A.
- Jiménez Salas, J.A. (1982) Aportaciones científicas españolas a la Geotecnia: discurso leído en el acto de su recepción [Spanish Scientific Contributions to Geotechnics: speech read at his reception], Madrid: Real Academia de Ciencias Exactas, Físicas y Naturales.
- Jiménez Salas, J.A. and Serrano, A. (1984) Condiciones geotécnicas del túnel bajo el estrecho de Gibraltar [Geotechnical Conditions of the Tunnel under the Strait of Gibraltar], Revista de Obras Públicas (ROP), No. 3227, pp. 533-553.
