= Third Millennium Bridge =

Third Millennium Bridge Puente del Tercer Milenio
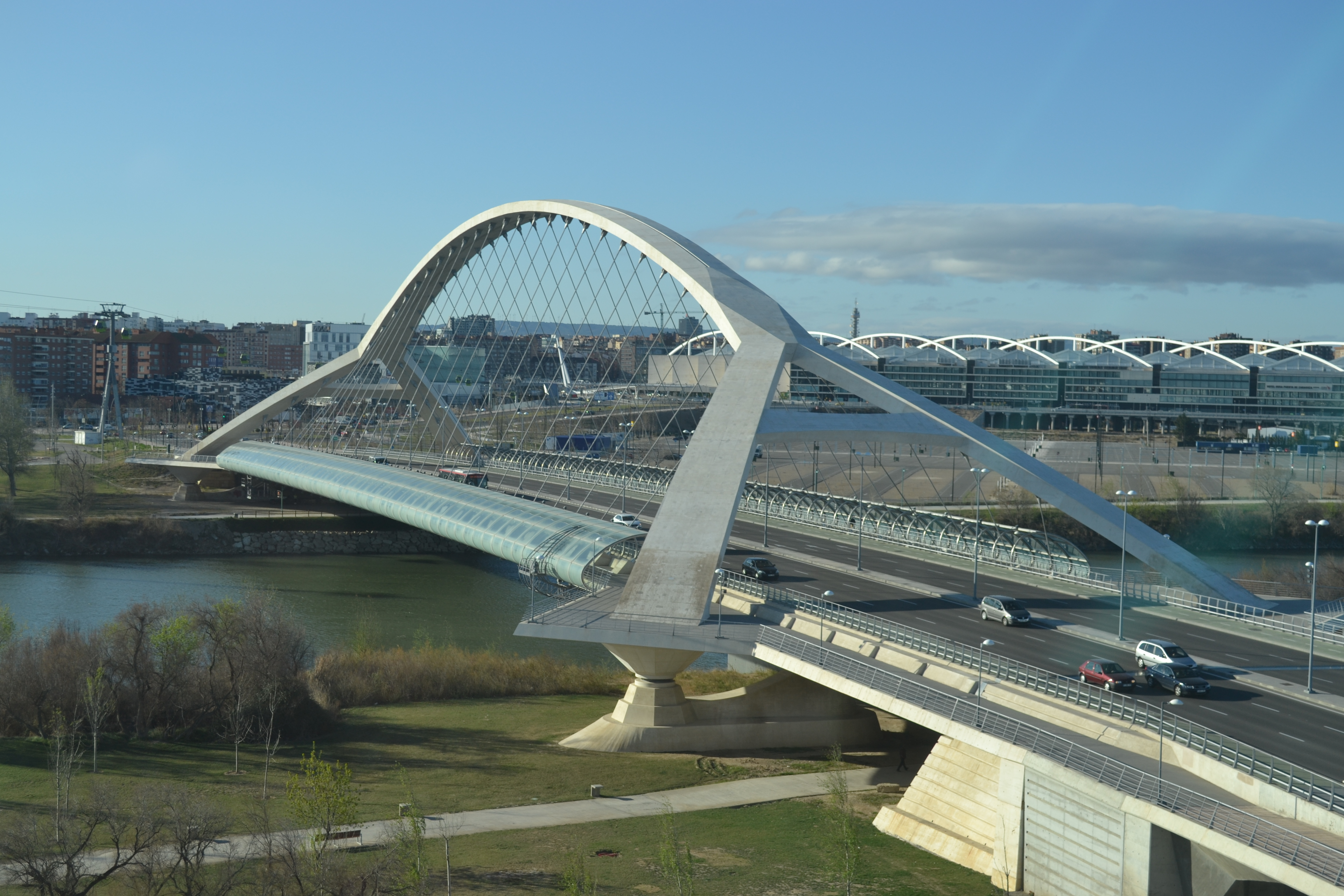
- Coordinates: 41°39′56″N 0°54′30″W
- Crosses: Ebro
- Locale: Zaragoza, Spain

Characteristics
- Design: Bow-string bridge
- Total length: 270 m
- Width: 48 m
- Longest span: 216 m

History
- Engineering design by: Juan José Arenas de Pablo
- Constructed by: Dragados
- Opened: 7 June 2008

Location
- Interactive map of Third Millennium Bridge

The Third Millennium Bridge (Spanish: Puente del Tercer Milenio) is a bow-string bridge in Zaragoza, Spain. It crosses the Ebro.

Puente del Tercer Milenio (2026).

The Third Millennium Bridge (Puente Tercer Milenio) spans the river Ebro in Zaragoza, Spain. (2026)

The Third Millennium Bridge (Puente Tercer Milenio) spans the river Ebro in Zaragoza, Spain. (2026) 02.

== History and description ==
A project by Juan José Arenas de Pablo, the final draft dates back to 2002. Building works took place between 2005 and 2008. Completing the Z-30 highway, its inception was programmed vis-à-vis the Expo 2008 in Zaragoza. Commissioned by the State-funded company Zaragoza Alta Velocidad, it was built by Dragados S.A.

It was opened on 7 June 2008.

The bridge displays a length of 270 m, a width of 48 m, and a main span of 216 m.
