= Ramón Ferreñac =

Spanish composer

Ramón Ferreñac (1763–1832) was a Spanish composer.

He has been praised for his sonatas for two and four hands by musicologists from the likes of Antonio Lozano and Felip Pedrell.
