= List of Bienes de Interés Cultural in the Province of Zaragoza =

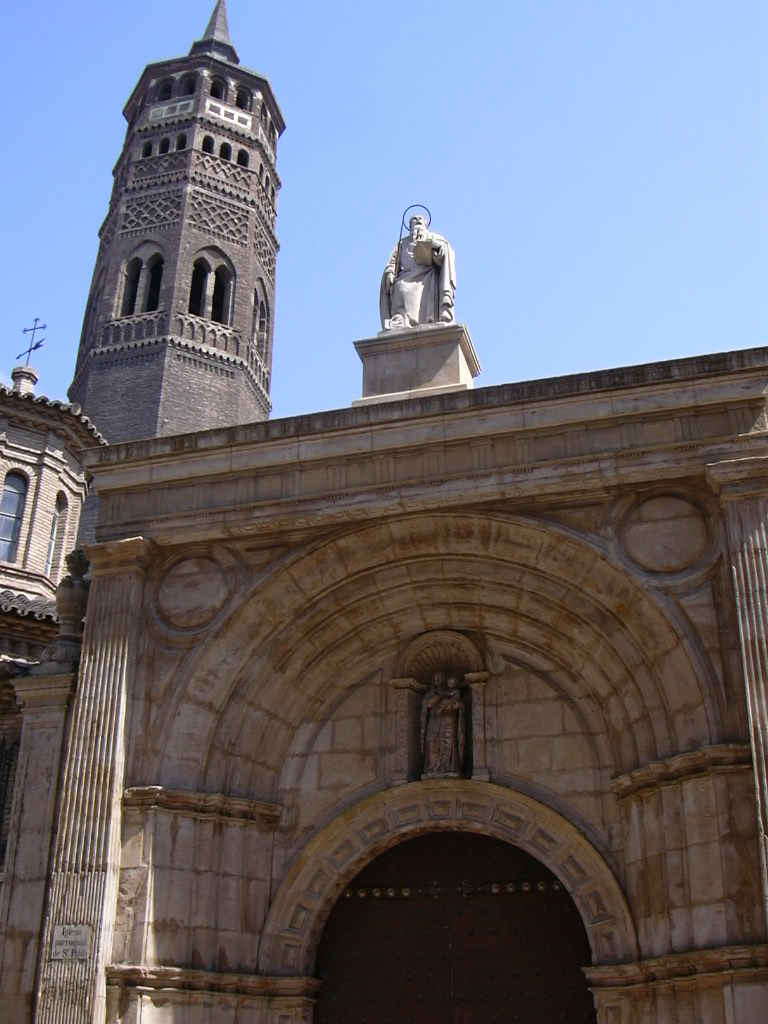
14th century Gothic−Mudéjar style facade of the Church of San Pablo.

List of Bien de Interés Cultural landmarks in the Province of Zaragoza, located in the Aragon region of northeastern Spain.

== Listed landmarks ==
- Aljafería
- Aragonese Way
- Augusta Bilbilis
- Basilica of Our Lady of the Pillar
- Calatayud
- Charterhouse of Aula Dei
- Church of San Pedro de los Francos
- Church of Santa Engracia de Zaragoza
- Colegiata de Santa María la Mayor (Caspe)
- Collegiate church of Santa María (Calatayud)
- Church of Santa María (Ateca)
- Condes de Argillo Palace
- Iglesia de Santa Tecla
- La Seo Cathedral
- Mausoleum of the Atilii
- Monasterio de Piedra
- Monastery of Comendadoras Canonesas del Santo Sepulcro
- Puerta del Carmen
- Roman mausoleum of Fabara
- Rueda Abbey
- Ruesta castle
- Sádaba Castle
- San Gil Abad (Zaragoza)
- San Miguel de los Navarros
- Santa Fe Abbey
- Santa María Magdalena, Zaragoza
- San Pablo church
- Archaeological zone of Segeda
- Tarazona Cathedral
- Veruela Abbey
- Wall of Daroca

== See also ==
- Bien de Interés Cultural landmarks in Aragon
- Buildings and structures in Zaragoza
