= List of tourist attractions in Zaragoza =

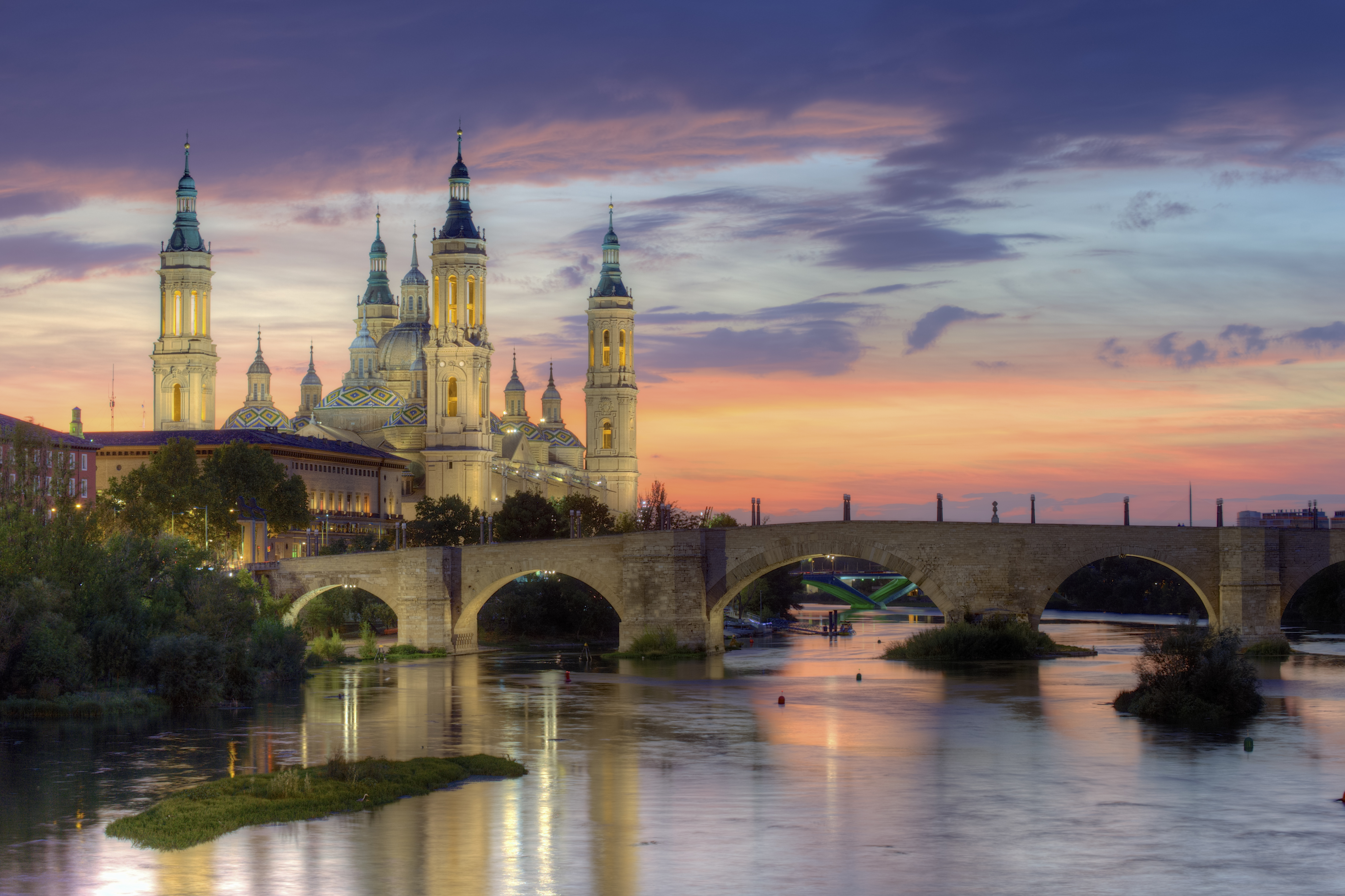
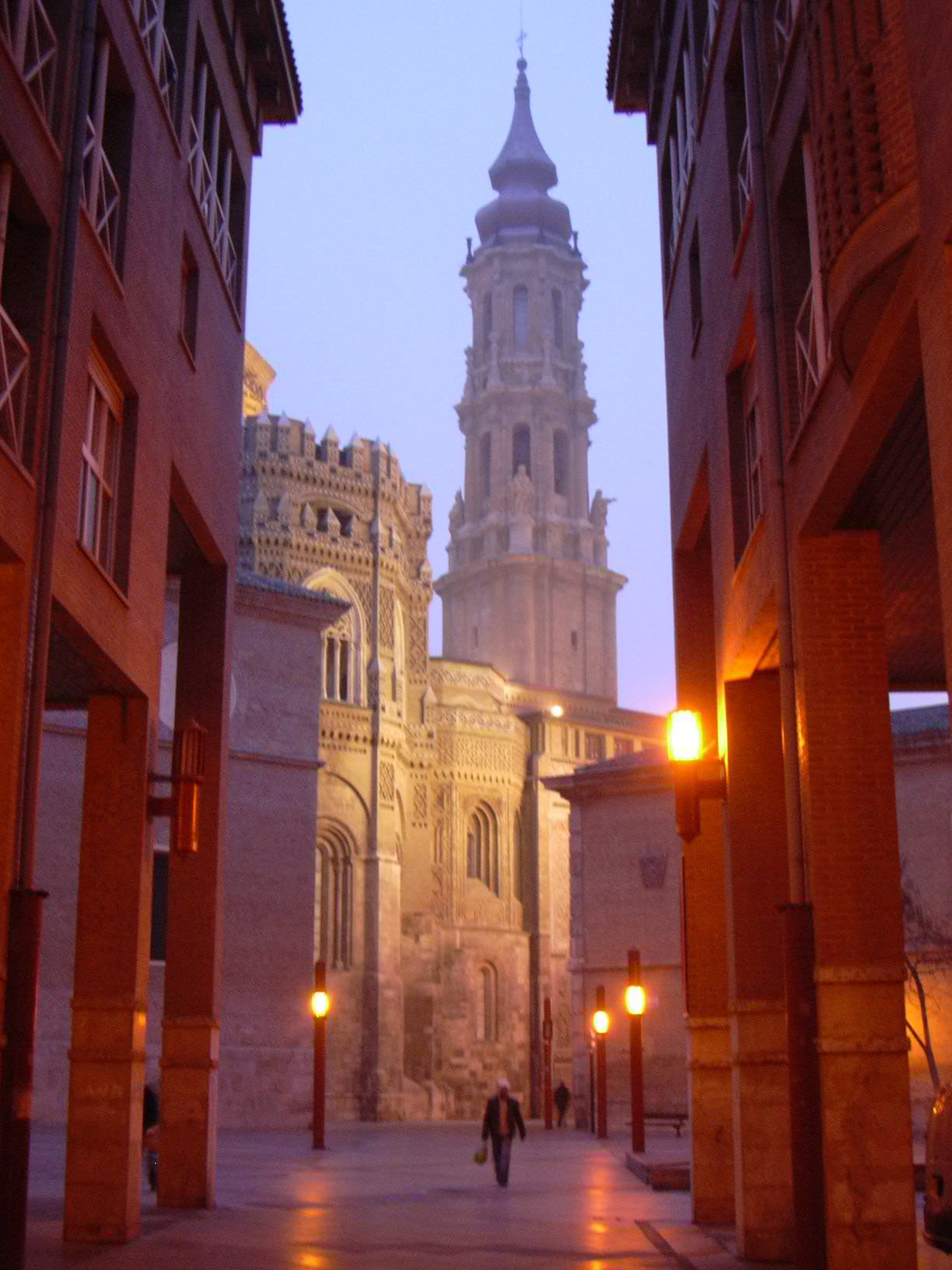
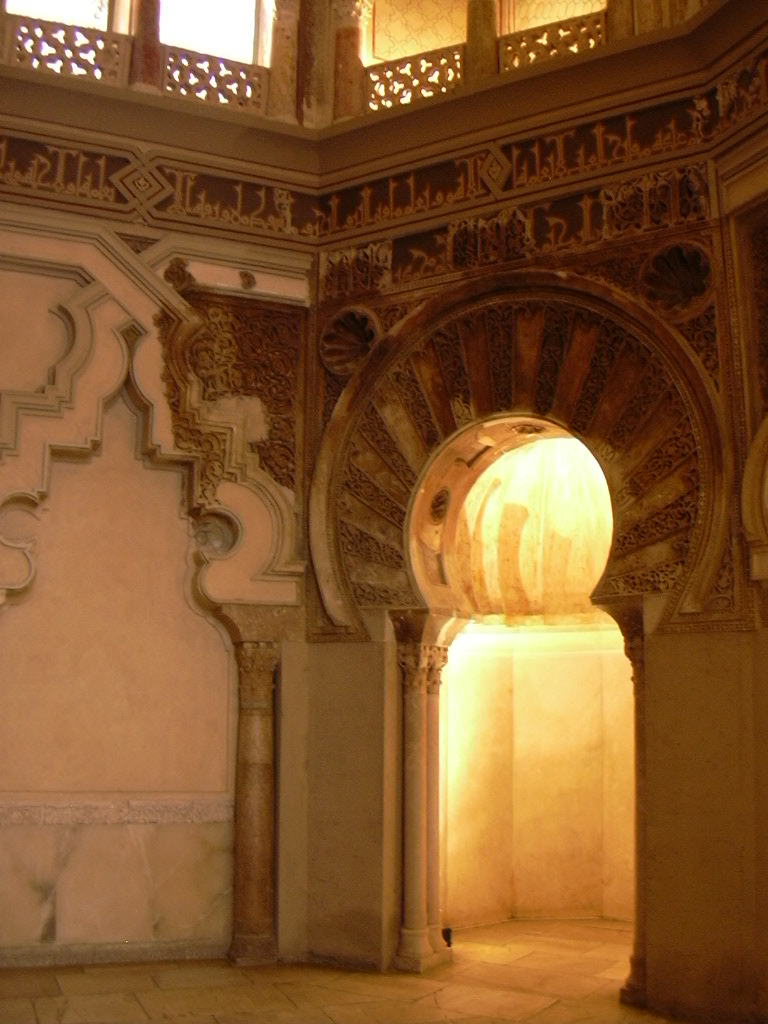
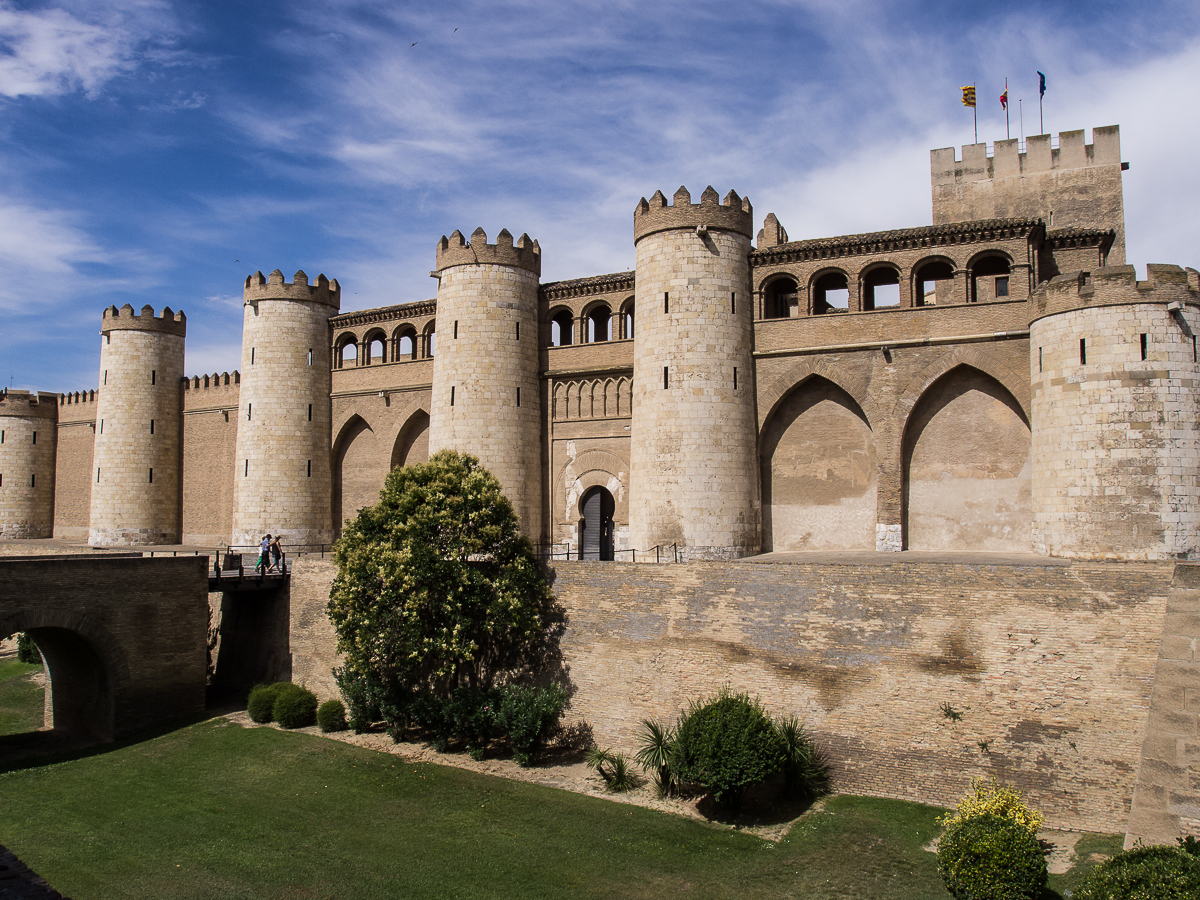
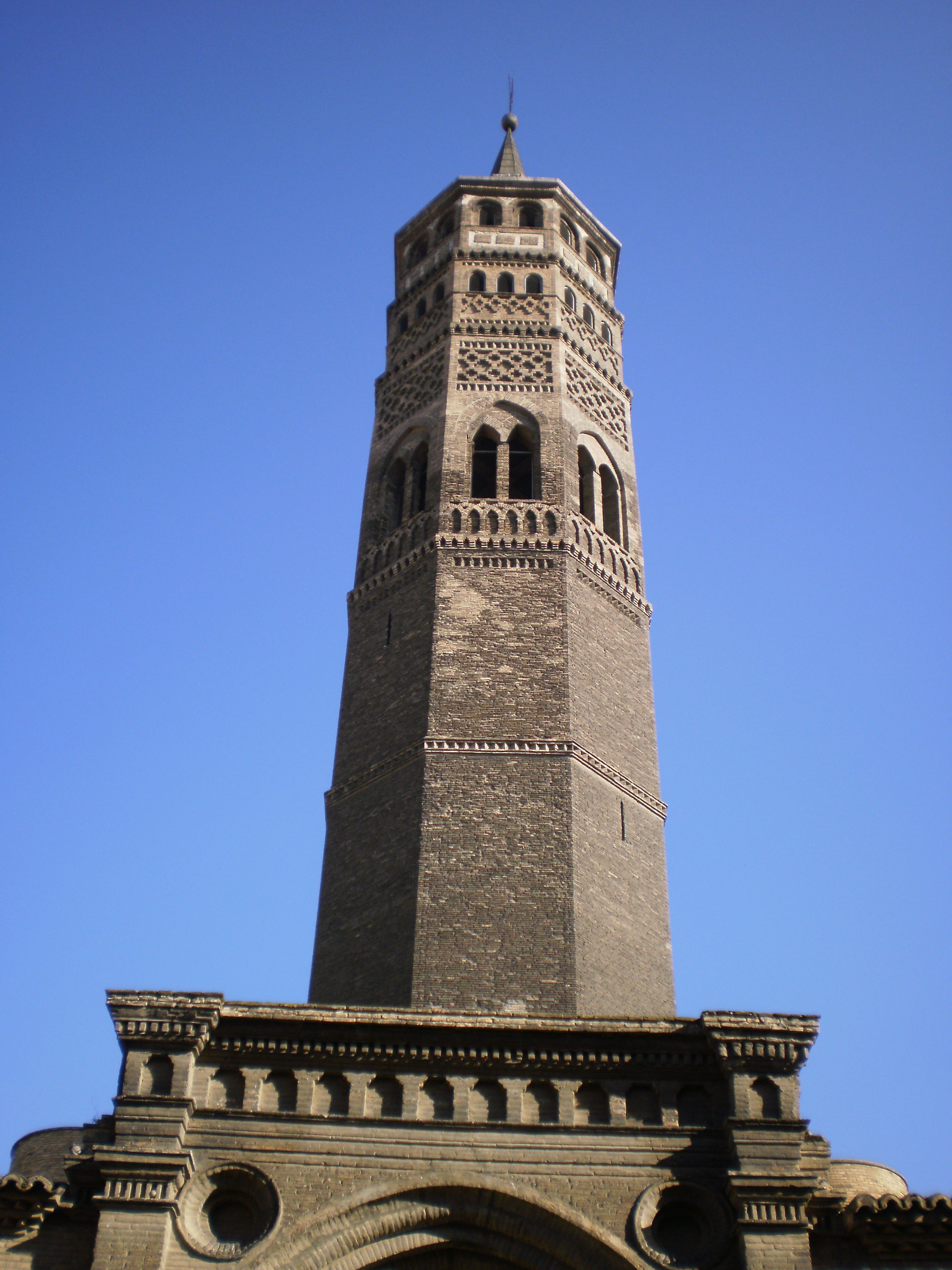
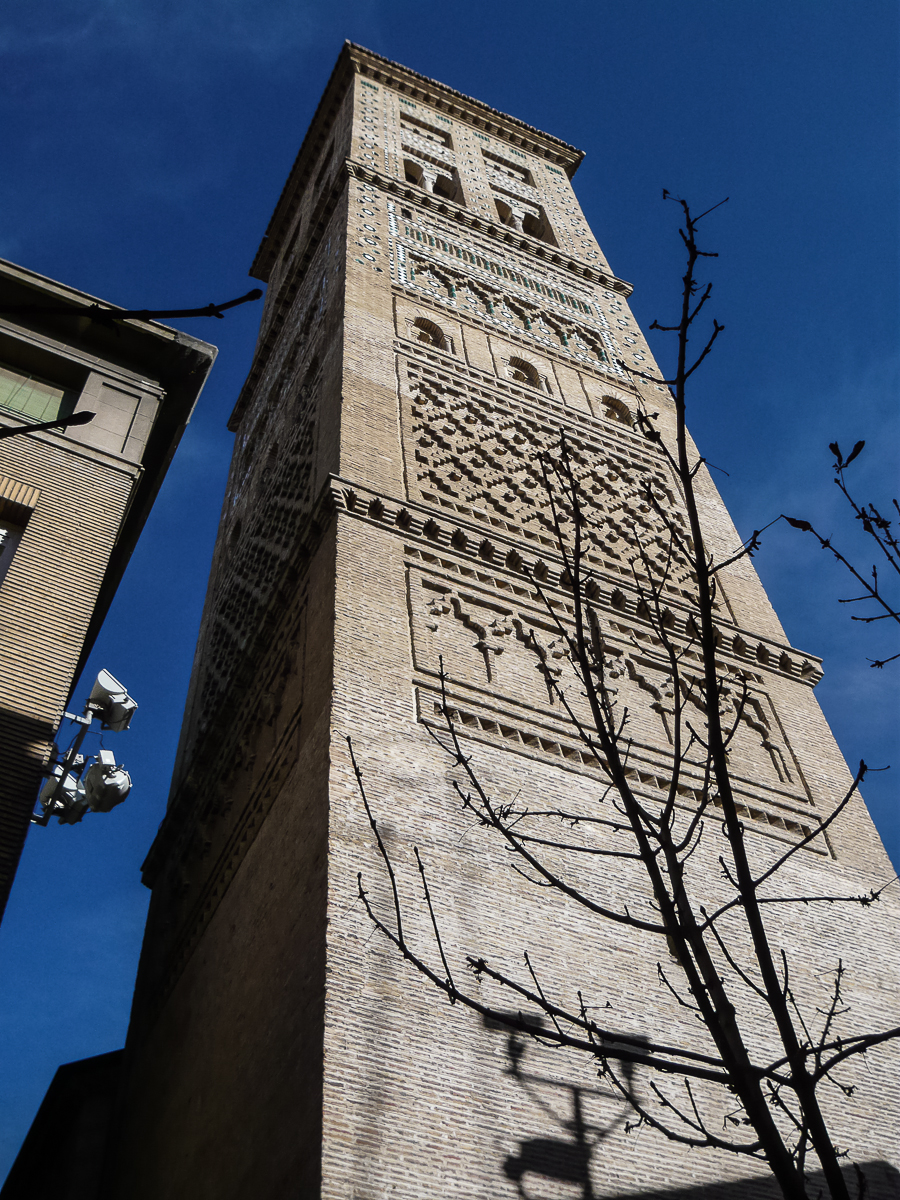
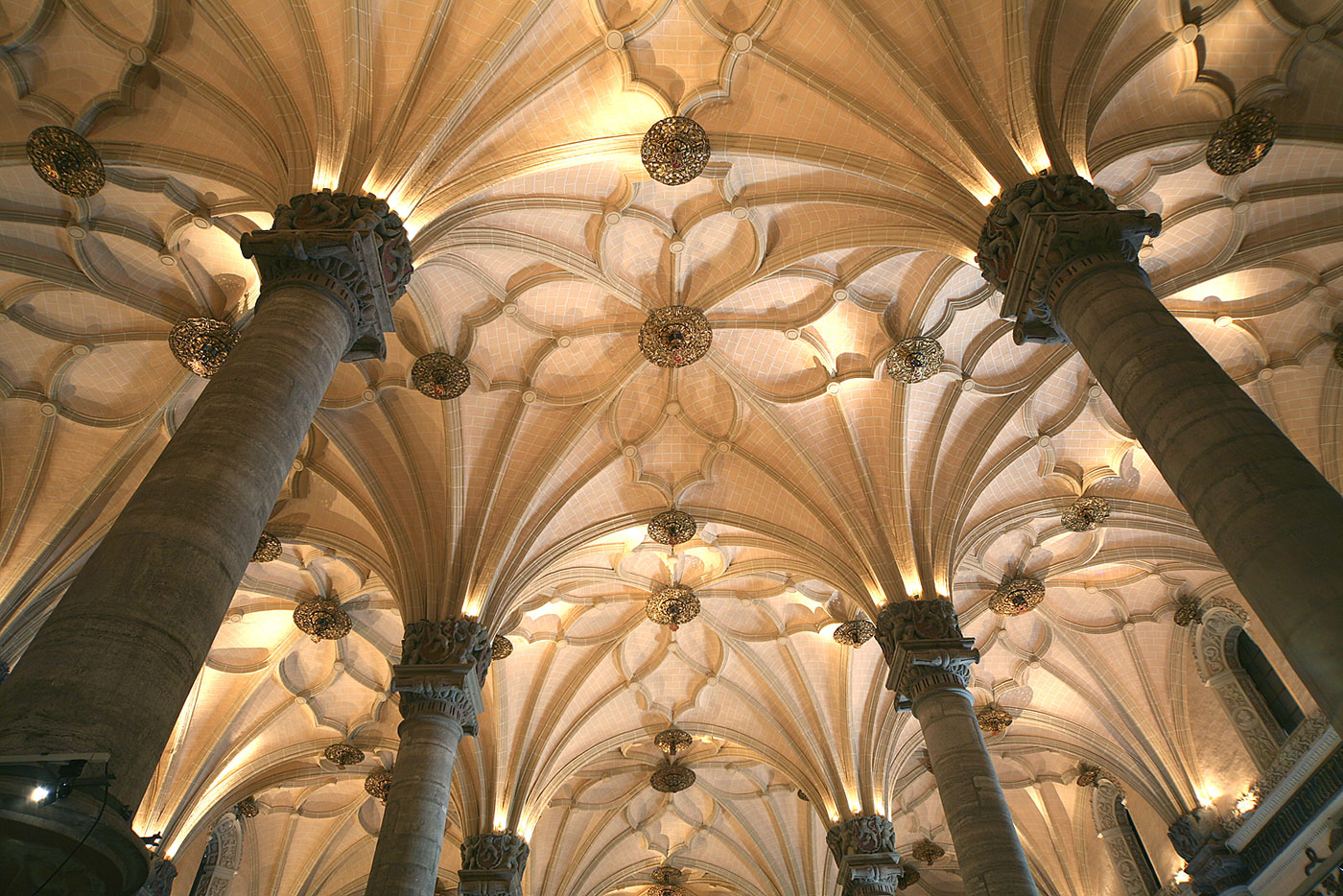
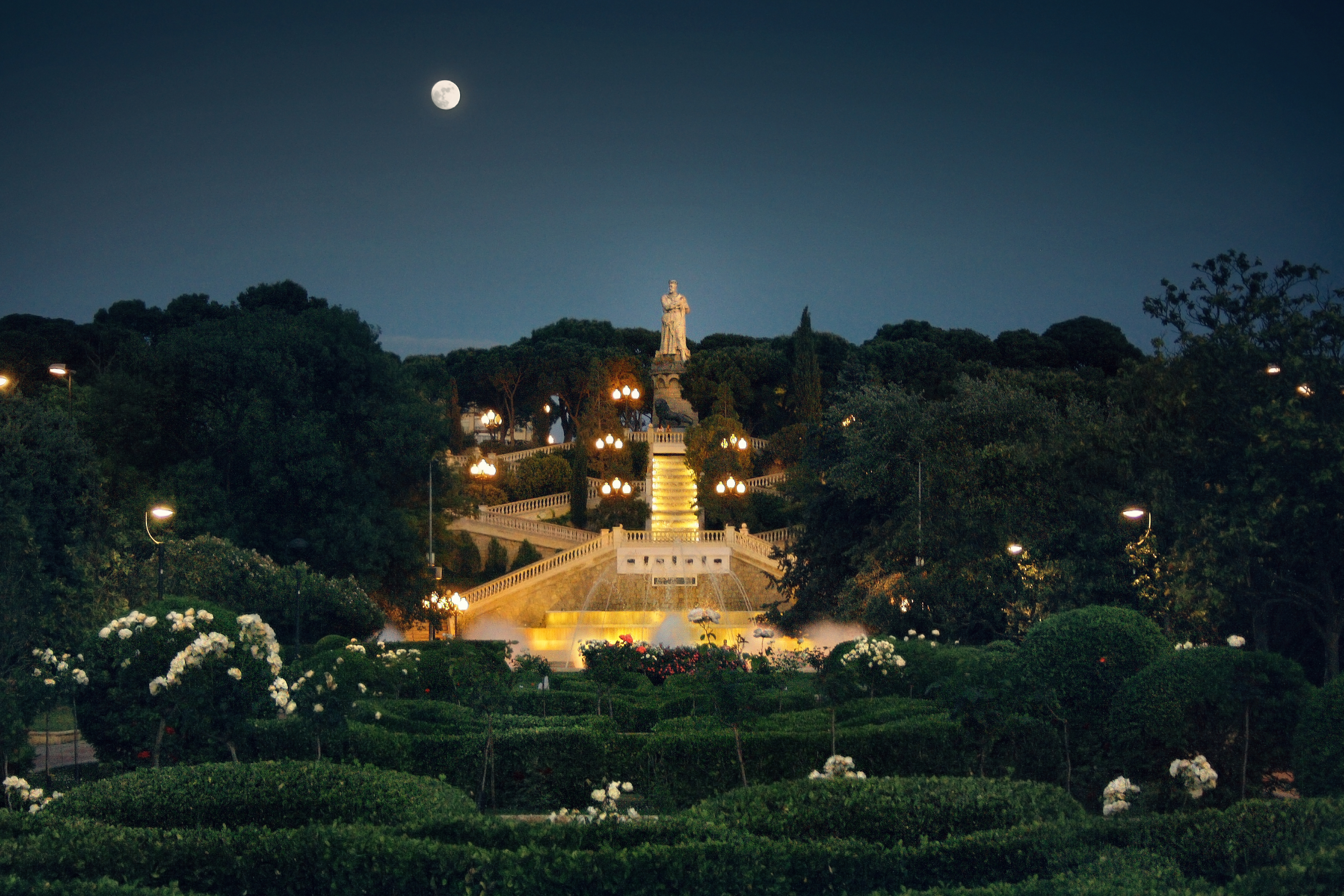

Below is a list of major tourist attractions in Zaragoza, Spain.

== Monuments ==
- Aljafería (fortified medieval palace; part of the World Heritage Site Mudéjar Architecture of Aragon)
- Old Stock Exchange (16th c.)
- Stone bridge (15th c.)

== Religious sites ==
- La Seo Cathedral -- part of the World Heritage Site Mudéjar Architecture of Aragon; gothic high altar in polychrome alabaster by Pere Johan (1394/1397 - after 1458)
- El Pilar Basilica -- high altar in alabaster by Damián Forment (1515–1518), frescoes by Francisco de Goya
- Church of San Pablo -- part of the World Heritage Site Mudéjar Architecture of Aragon; high altar by Damián Forment (1515–1518)
- Renaissance mudejar churches: San Miguel de los Navarros, San Gil Abad, Santa María Magdalena
- Church of Santa Engracia de Zaragoza (two Early Christian sarcophagi in the crypt)
- Santo Sepulcro Convent in Zaragoza

== Museums ==
- Museum of Zaragoza
- Roman Museums: Theater Museum, Baths Museum, Port Museum, Forum Museum, and Roman Walls
- Alma Mater Museum (old Diocesan Museum of Zaragoza)
- Museo Goya - Colección Ibercaja - Museo Camón Aznar
- Tapestry museum (inside La Seo Cathedral)
- Frescoes in the Cartuja de Aula Dei
- Origami Museum of Zaragoza (EMOZ; first origami museum in Europe)

== Open spaces ==
- El Pilar Square
- "Big Park" (connected to the Venice Pine Forest [Pinar de Venecia] and the amusement park)
- Luis Buñuel Park and nearby area of the Expo 2008
- Galachos de Juslibol (oxbow lakes formed by the Ebro river 2 km outside Zaragoza)

== Modern architecture ==
- Torre del Agua
- Bridge Pavilion

== Festivals and festivities ==
- El Pilar festival
- Holy Week festivities

== Other ==
- Aquarium of Zaragoza (biggest freshwater aquarium in Europe)
- El Tubo (a few narrow streets in the old part of Zaragoza, renown for their tapas and the cabaret El Plata)
