= Juan de Salas =

Juan de Salas may refer to:

- Juan de Salas (friar), Franciscan friar active in New Mexico and Texas around 1630
- Juan de Salas (sculptor), Spanish Renaissance sculptor of the early 16th century
