= Ruesta Castle =

Castle in Ruesta, Spain

Coordinates: 42°35′23″N 1°04′39″W

- Castillo de Ruesta
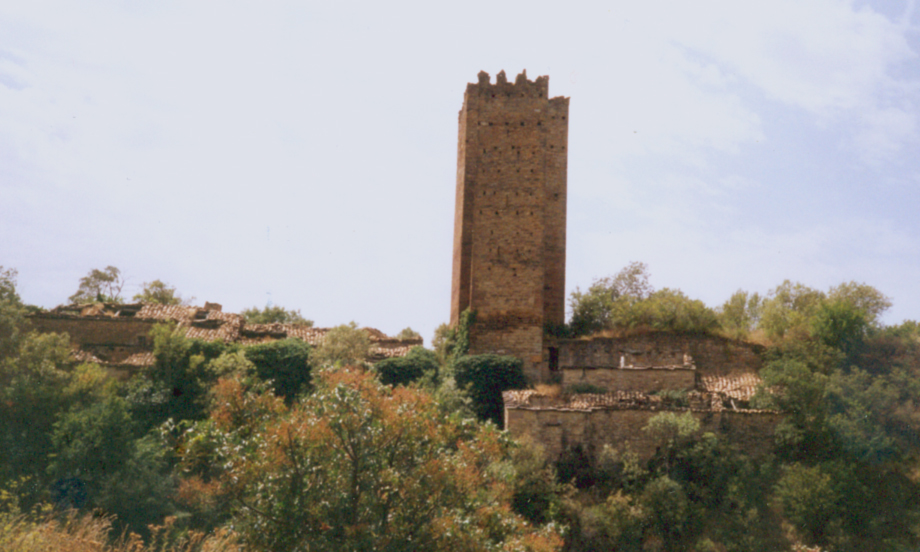
- Interactive map of Ruesta Castle

General information
- Location: Ruesta, Spain
- Year built: 11th–12th centuries

The Ruesta castle (in Spanish: Castillo de Ruesta) is a building from the 11th century which was conceived as one of the four defensive enclaves of Aragon, Spain. It is located in the uninhabited village of Ruesta, in the municipality of Sigüés, in the province of Zaragoza.

== History ==
With the kings of Navarre's territorial expansion eastward since 850 and in order to defend the territory dominated by them, they decided to build a castle in this strategic position. From 905 to 925, it already appeared as the seat of royal tenure, in the defense of the areas of Yesa and Arrés.

Between 996 and 999, the castle was destroyed by Almanzor in his campaign to reconquer territories. Almanzor made his last raid on the eastern frontiers in 999, when, after passing through Pamplona, he headed east and destroyed Manresa and Pla de Bages. In April, he had attacked the county of Pallars, which was ruled by the brother of the widow of Castilian count García Sánchez. It is estimated that it may have been an attempt by the Navarrese king and the Catalan counts to stop paying tribute to Cordoba by taking advantage of the fact that Almanzor was engaged in the crushing of Ziri ibn Atiyya, which triggered the attacks against this region.

Later, between 1016 and 1018, Sancho Garcés III of Pamplona rebuilt the castle and, upon his death, it was granted to his successor on the Navarrese throne. In 1056, the king of Navarre, Sancho Garcés IV of Pamplona, granted the town of Ruesta to his uncle Ramiro I of Aragon. In 1294, the Hebrew community appears guarding and administering the castle. In 1381, King Pedro IV of Aragon sold the castles and places of Ruesta, Artieda, Pintano and Osia to Pedro Jordán de Urriés, lord of Ayerbe and Sigüés. The sale of the places and castles of Ruesta was temporarily revoked in 1385.

On May 22nd 2006, the castle was declared a Bienes de Interés Cultural.

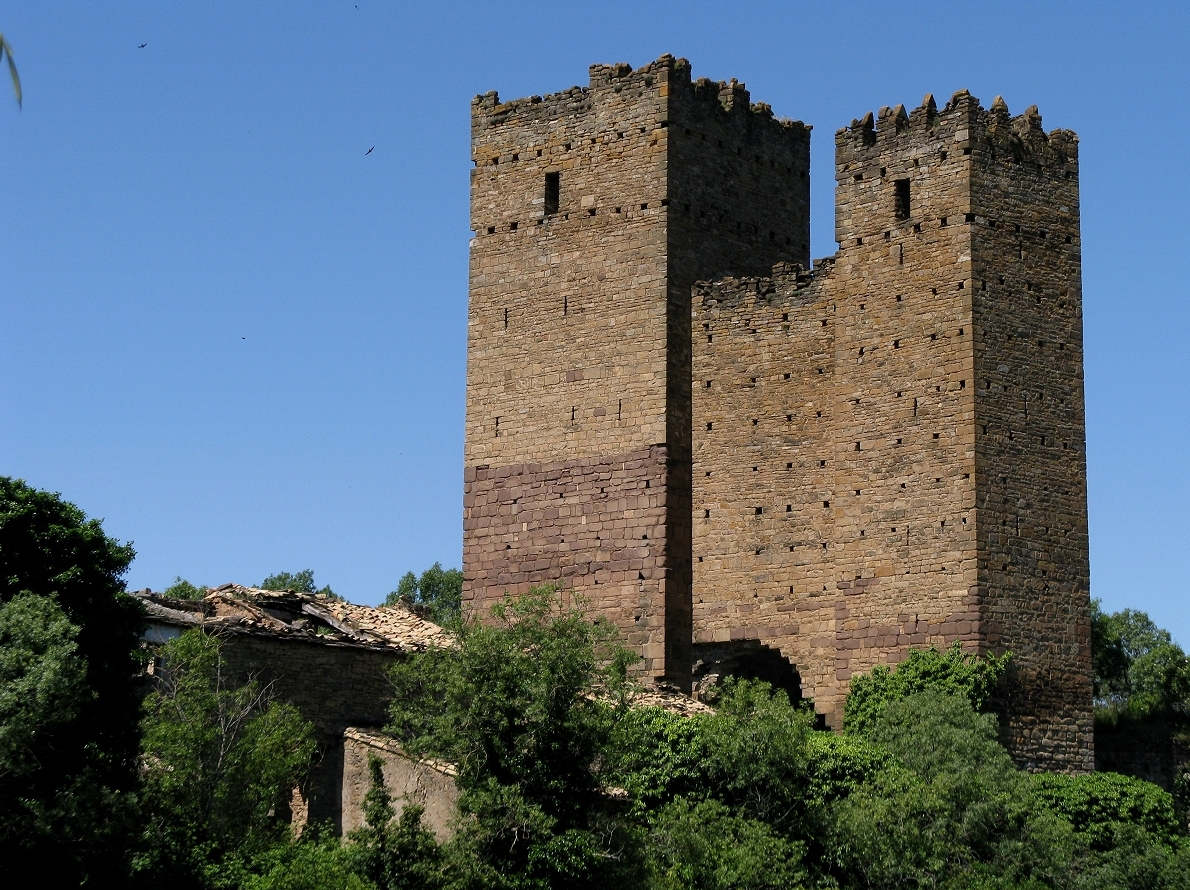
The two towers.

== Structure ==
The Ruesta castle was a rectangular building of about 45 by 20 meters. Two towers of different sizes are preserved.

The keep, which is the tallest and sturdiest tower, is partially preserved, although the upper part is missing and the rest is in ruins. The tower is estimated to have been about 25 meters high and had four floors. The access door to the tower is also preserved.

The second tower is smaller and possibly also rectangular in plan. The two towers are joined by a wall, and part of their crenellated tops is conserved.

== See also ==
- List of Bienes de Interés Cultural in the Province of Zaragoza
- List of catalogued assets of the province of Zaragoza
