= Jaca Cathedral =

- Cathedral of Saint Peter
- Catedral de San Pedro
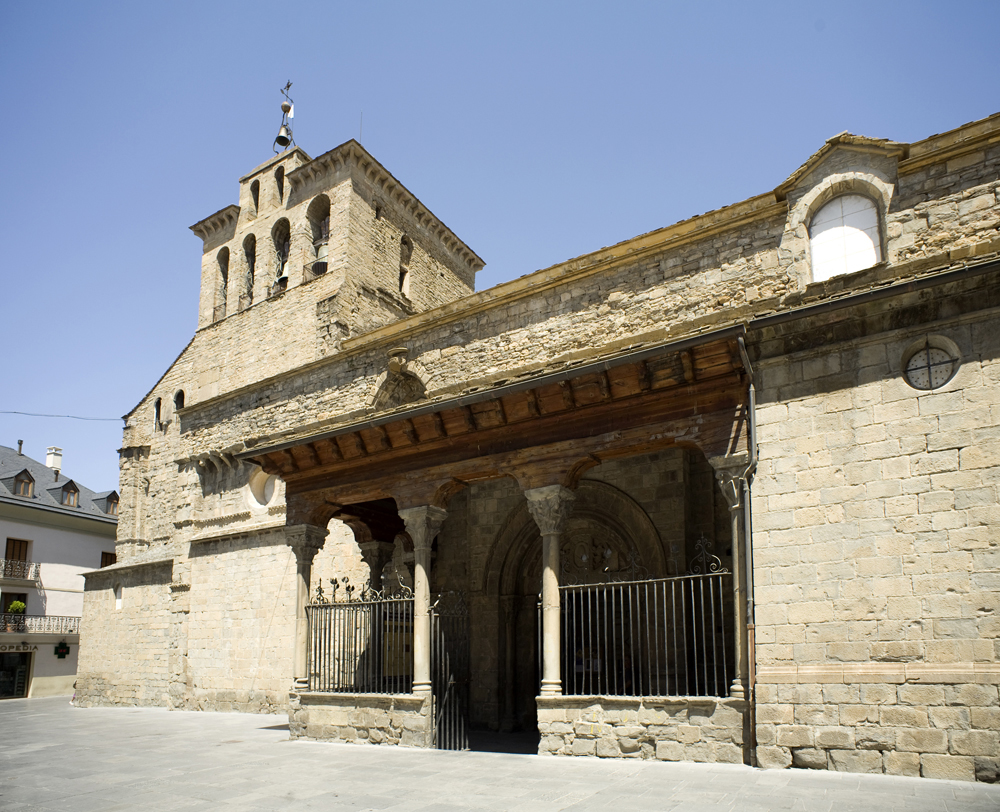
- South façade
- Jaca Cathedral
- 42°34′13.8″N 0°32′56.8″W
- Location: Jaca
- Address: Plaza de la Catedral
- Country: Spain
- Denomination: Catholic

History
- Status: Cathedral
- Dedication: Saint Peter

Architecture
- Style: Romanesque, Gothic
- Years built: 1077—1130

Administration
- Metropolis: Pamplona and Tudela
- Diocese: Jaca

Clergy
- Bishop: Vicente Jiménez Zamora

Spanish Cultural Heritage
- Type: Non-movable
- Criteria: Monument
- Designated: 3 June 1931
- Reference no.: RI-51-0000627

The Cathedral of Saint Peter (Spanish: Catedral de San Pedro) is a Catholic cathedral located in Jaca, Spain. It is the seat of the Diocese of Jaca.

It is the first Romanesque cathedral built in Aragon, and one of the oldest in the Iberian peninsula. Its current appearance is the result of later additions and modifications introduced especially in the early modern period (from the late 15th to late 18th century). The cathedral was erected on command of King Sancho Ramírez, who, after renovating in Rome his vassal oath to the Pope Alexander II (1068), had obtained from the latter the right to establish the episcopal seat in Jaca, then capital of the Kingdom of Aragon.

== History ==
After Jaca became the capital of Aragon (1036), the city obtained the status of episcopal see in 1077. This made the construction of a cathedral church necessary. The starting date of the construction is unknown, but it is generally considered around that date. The main section of the church was completed around 1130. In 1395 a fire destroyed the cathedral's ceiling, which was rebuilt in the following years and was substantially renovated in the early 16th century. In the same period the aisles were added and the central nave was enlarged. In Baroque times the St. Horosia Chapel, the loggia and the cloister were added, while the interior received an altarpiece and other decorations.

In the late 18th century one of the apses was demolished and rebuilt, and the central apse was renovated.

== Description ==
The cathedral has a generally Romanesque structure, although several elements are in Gothic, Renaissance and Baroque styles. The plan is in the forms of a nave and two aisles, with three apses and two external portals, both provided with loggias (one of which in Renaissance style). Only one of the current apses is original. Of the other two, the central one was renovated in the 18th century, and the other one rebuilt in the same age.

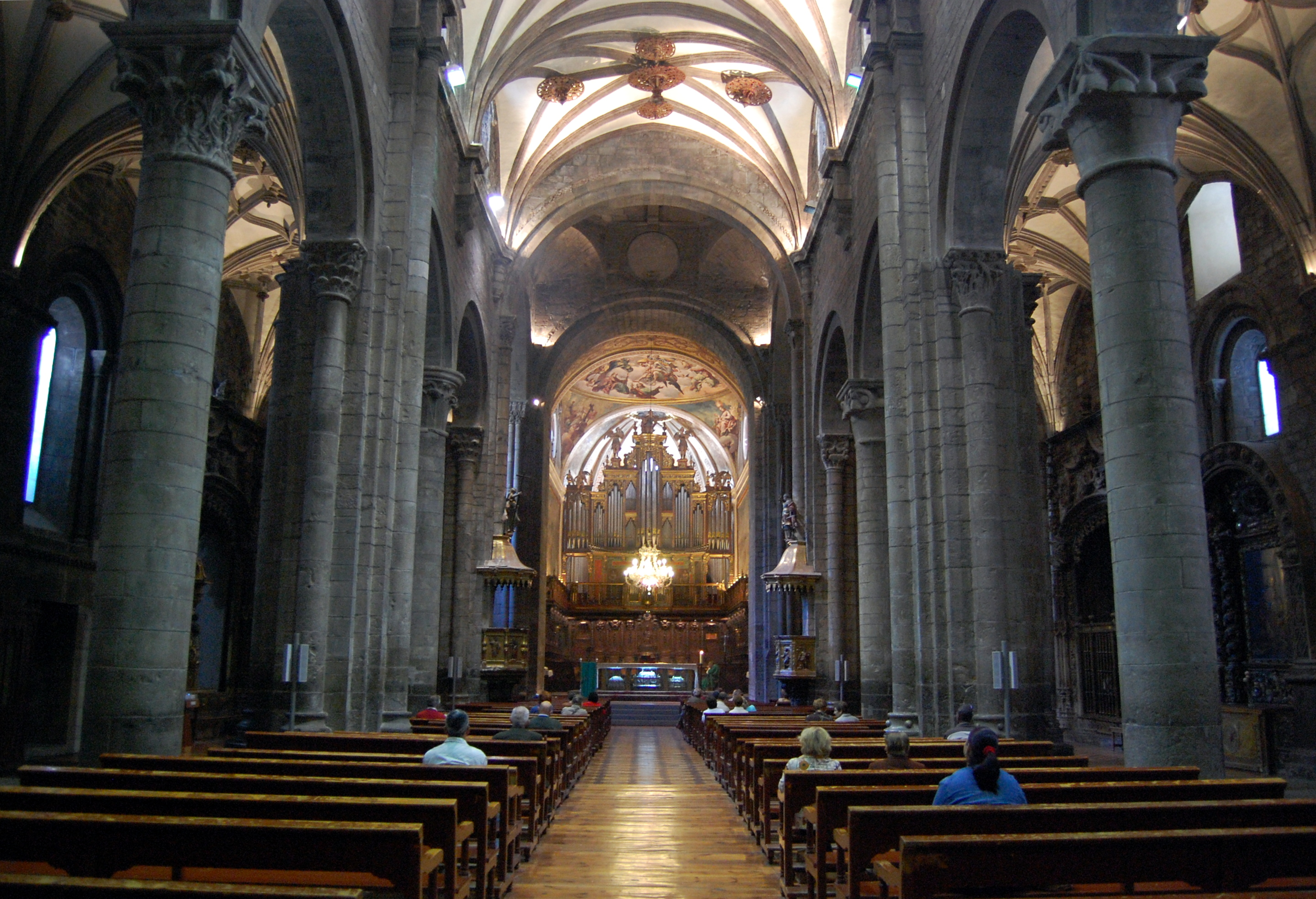
Interior of the cathedral

The nave and the aisles are separated by arcades supported by piers which are alternatively cruciform and cylindrical in plan, an element inspired by contemporary French structures. The capitals of the piers, in Corinthian style, have decorative motifs with vegetables and geometrical shapes. The ceiling was originally in wood: in modern times it was replaced by cross vaults. The large dome at the crossing is octagonal. On the four sides are several chapels built from the late-15th century to the mid-17th century. The earlier ones (those dedicated to the Holy Cross and to St. Augustine) are late Gothic in style, those designed in the 16th century (St. Michael and St. Jerome, for example) show late Renaissance and Mannerist influences; the chapel of St. Horosia, completely remade in the 18th century, is in Baroque style.

Artworks in the interior include the altarpiece of the St. Michael Chapel, sculpted by Gil Morales the Younger, Gabriel Yoli, Juan de Salas and the Florentine Giovanni de Moreto (or Moretto). The latter also directed the construction of the chapel, which is considered amongst the finest examples of the Renaissance-Plateresque architecture in Aragon. The altarpiece of the high altar was finished in the early 17th century. The decoration of the central apse was painted by Manuel Bayeu, brother-in-law of Francisco Goya, in 1792–1793.

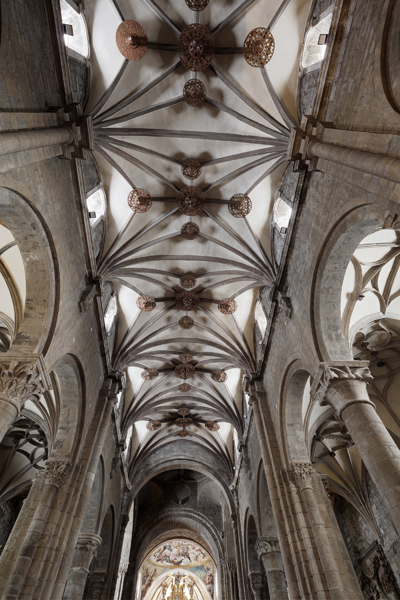
Nave vaults

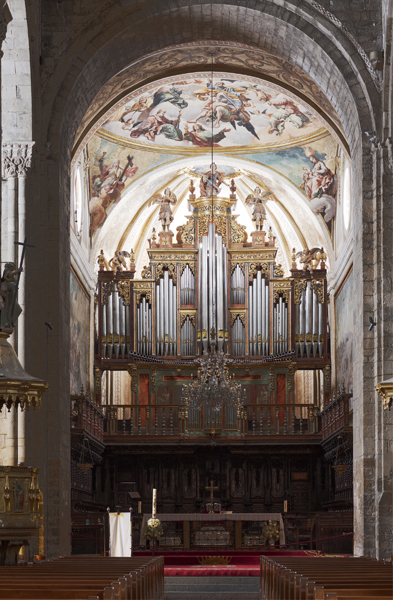
Organ

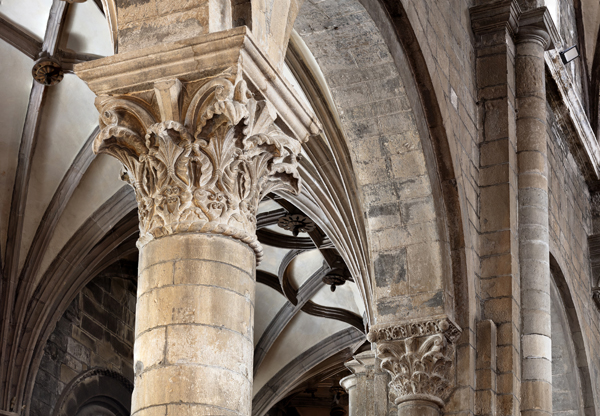
Capitals

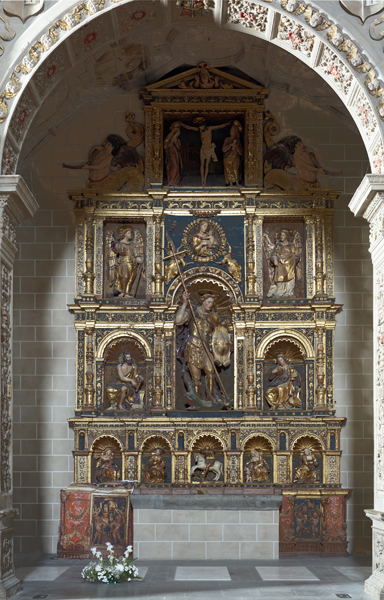
Chapel of Saint Michael

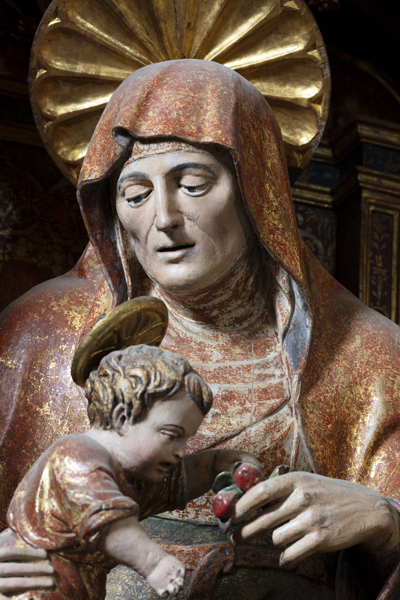
Chapel of Saint Anne

== See also ==
- Roman Catholic Diocese of Jaca
