= Sádaba =

Sádaba (Spanish) Sadaba (Aragonese)
- municipality
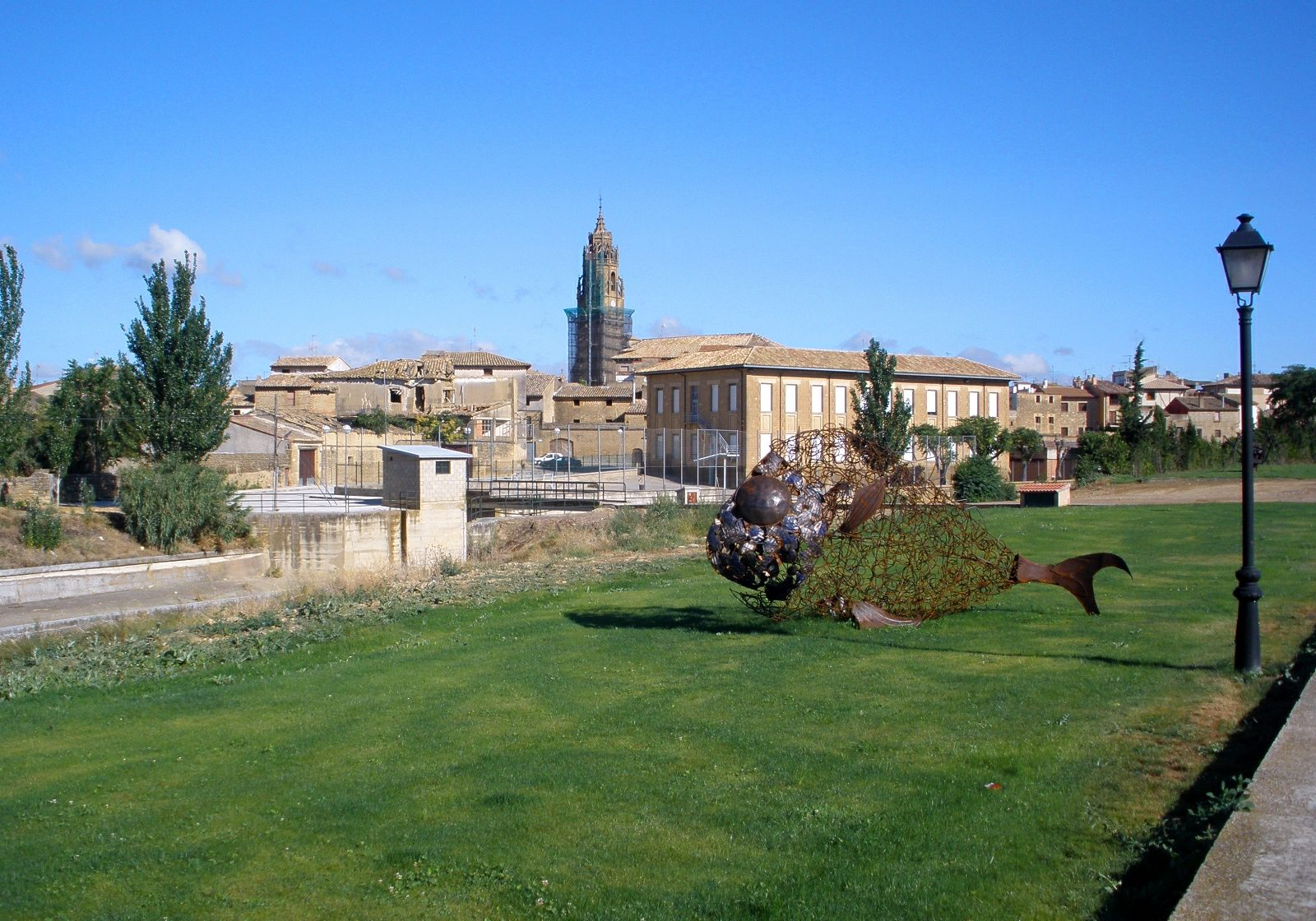

- Flag Coat of arms

- Location in Spain.
- Coordinates: 42°17′N 1°16′W
- Country: Spain
- Autonomous community: Aragon
- Province: Zaragoza
- Comarca: Cinco Villas

Government
  - Mayor: Santos Navarro Giménez

Area
  - Total: 129 km^{2} (50 sq mi)
- Elevation: 454 m (1,490 ft)

Population (2025-01-01)
  - Total: 1,278
  - Density: 9.91/km^{2} (25.7/sq mi)
- Demonym: Sadabenses
- Time zone: UTC+1 (CET)
  - Summer (DST): UTC+2 (CEST)

Sádaba (in Aragonese: Sadaba) is a municipality located in the province of Zaragoza, Aragon, Spain.

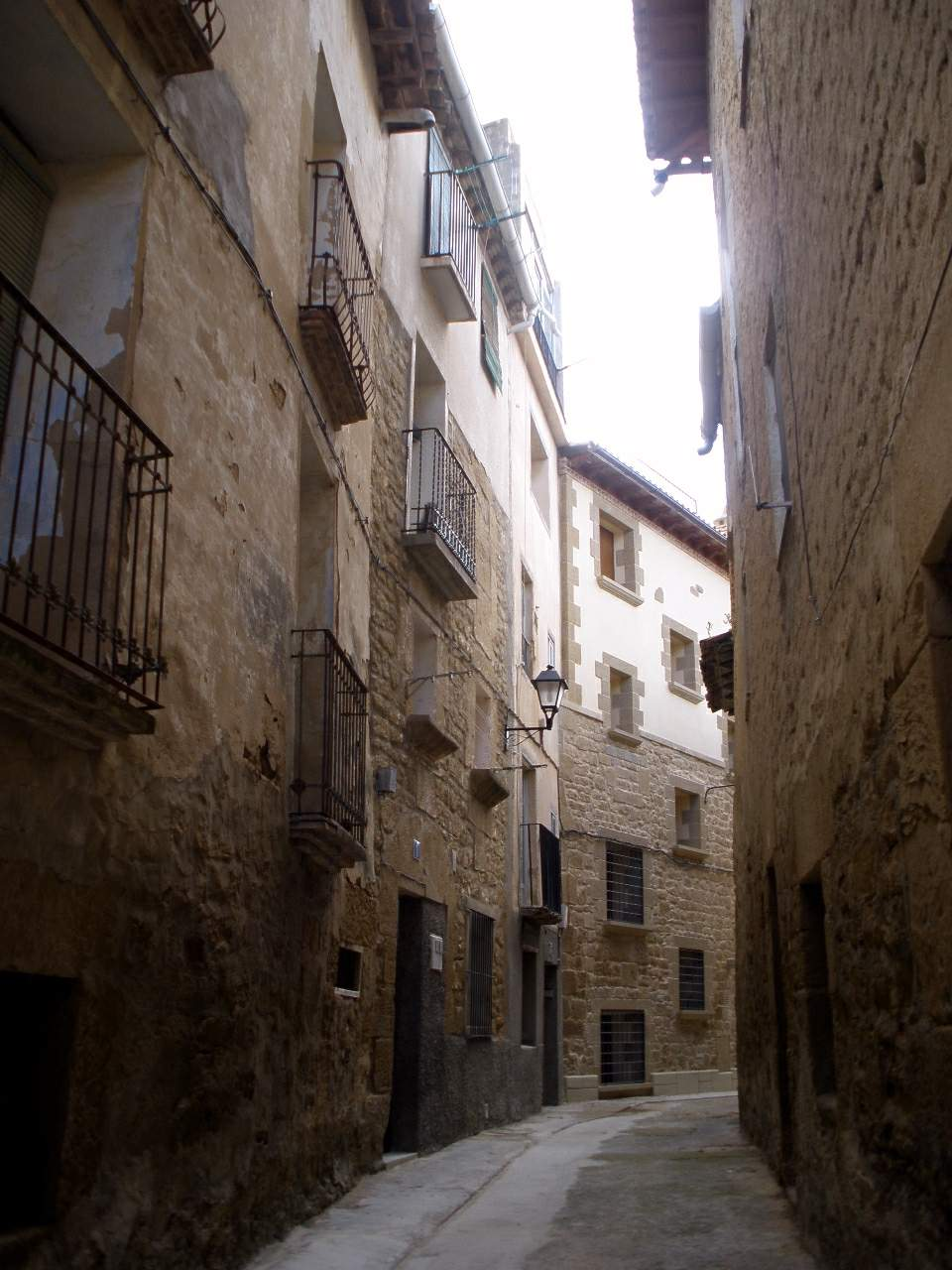

Sights include the ancient Roman Mausoleum of the Atilii and the Sádaba Castle.

== See also ==
- List of municipalities in Zaragoza
