= Arbués =

- Locality
- Location within Aragon Location within Spain
- Coordinates: 42°30′26″N 0°47′3″W
- Country: Spain
- Autonomous community: Aragon
- Province: Province of Huesca
- Municipality: Bailo, Spain
- Elevation: 765 m (2,510 ft)

Population
  - Total: 11

Arbués is a locality located in the municipality of Bailo, Spain, in Huesca province, Aragon, Spain. As of 2020, it has a population of 11.

== Geography ==
Arbués is located 68km northwest of Huesca.
