= Alastuey =

- Locality
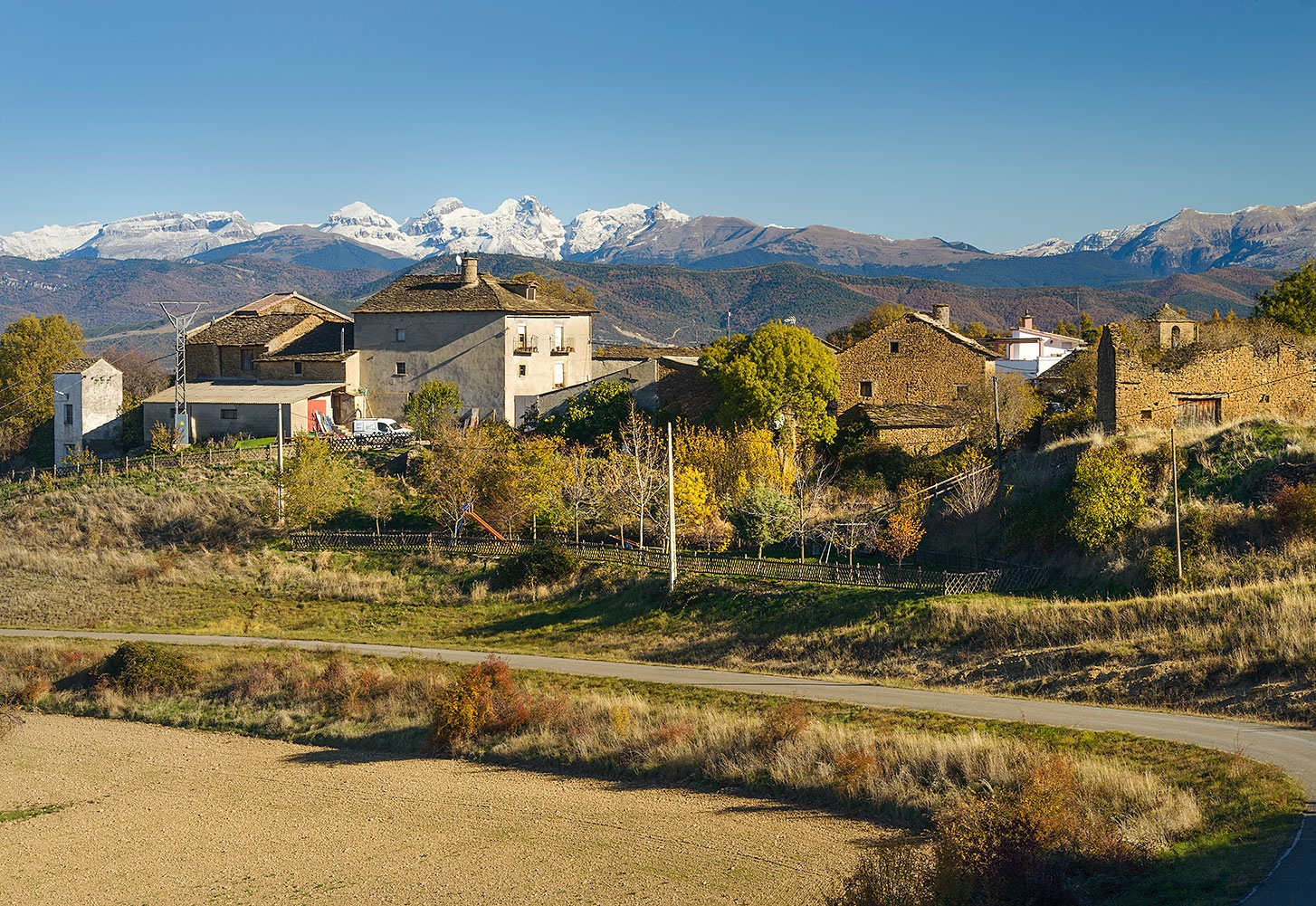

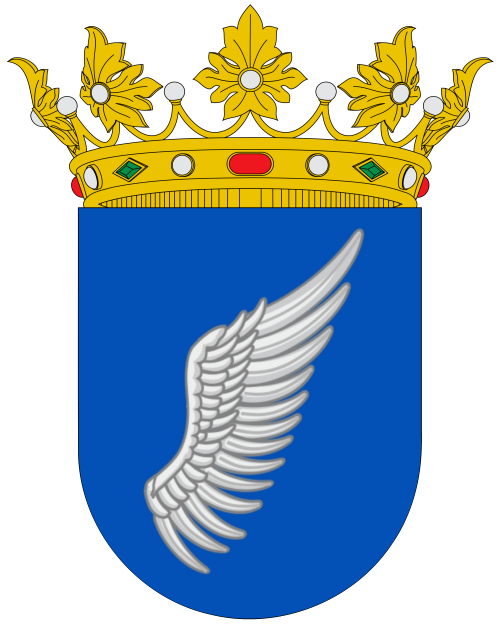
- Coat of arms

- Location within Aragon Location within Spain
- Coordinates: 42°31′16″N 0°45′36″W
- Country: Spain
- Autonomous community: Aragon
- Province: Huesca
- Municipality: Bailo
- Local entity: Alastuey
- Elevation: 826 m (2,710 ft)

Population (2023)
  - Total: 14
- Postal code: 22760, Alastuey

Alastuey is a locality located in the municipality of Bailo, in Huesca province, autonomous community of Aragon, Spain. As of 2023, it has a population of 14.

== Geography ==
Alastuey is located 71 km north-northwest of Huesca.
