= Morata de Jalón =

- municipality
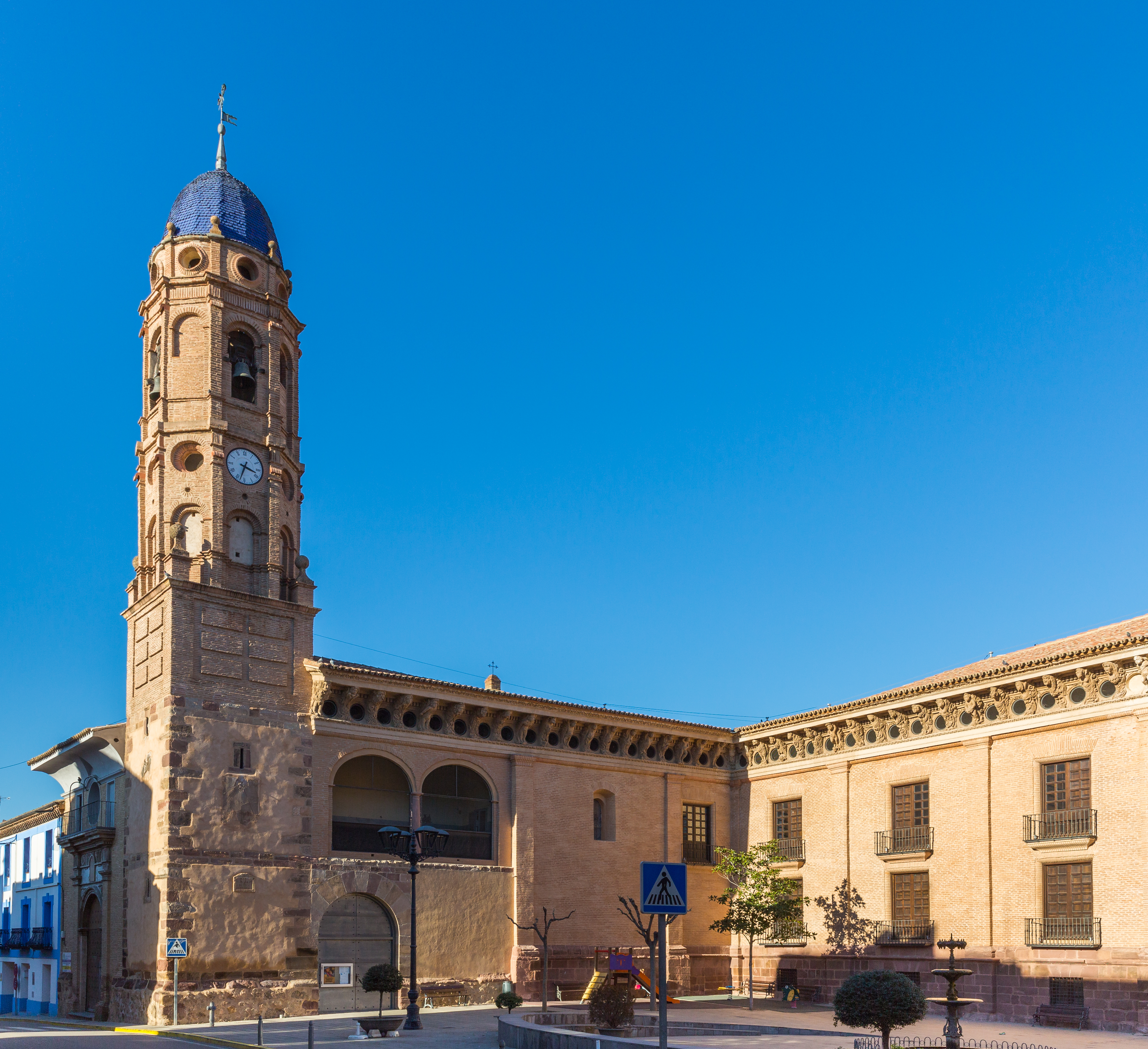

- Flag Coat of arms

- Location in Spain. Morata de Jalón (Spain) Morata de Jalón (Europe)
- Coordinates: 41°28′N 1°28′W
- Country: Spain
- Autonomous community: Aragon
- Province: Zaragoza
- Comarca: Valdejalón

Government
  - Mayor: Martina Cristina Andres Ostariz

Area
  - Total: 22 km^{2} (8.5 sq mi)
- Elevation: 415 m (1,362 ft)

Population (2025-01-01)
  - Total: 1,100
  - Density: 50/km^{2} (130/sq mi)
- Time zone: UTC+1 (CET)
  - Summer (DST): UTC+2 (CEST)

Morata de Jalón is a municipality located in the province of Zaragoza, Aragon, Spain.

It is the location of the Condes de Argillo Palace (1676).

== See also ==
- Valdejalón
- List of municipalities in Zaragoza
