= Larués =

- Locality
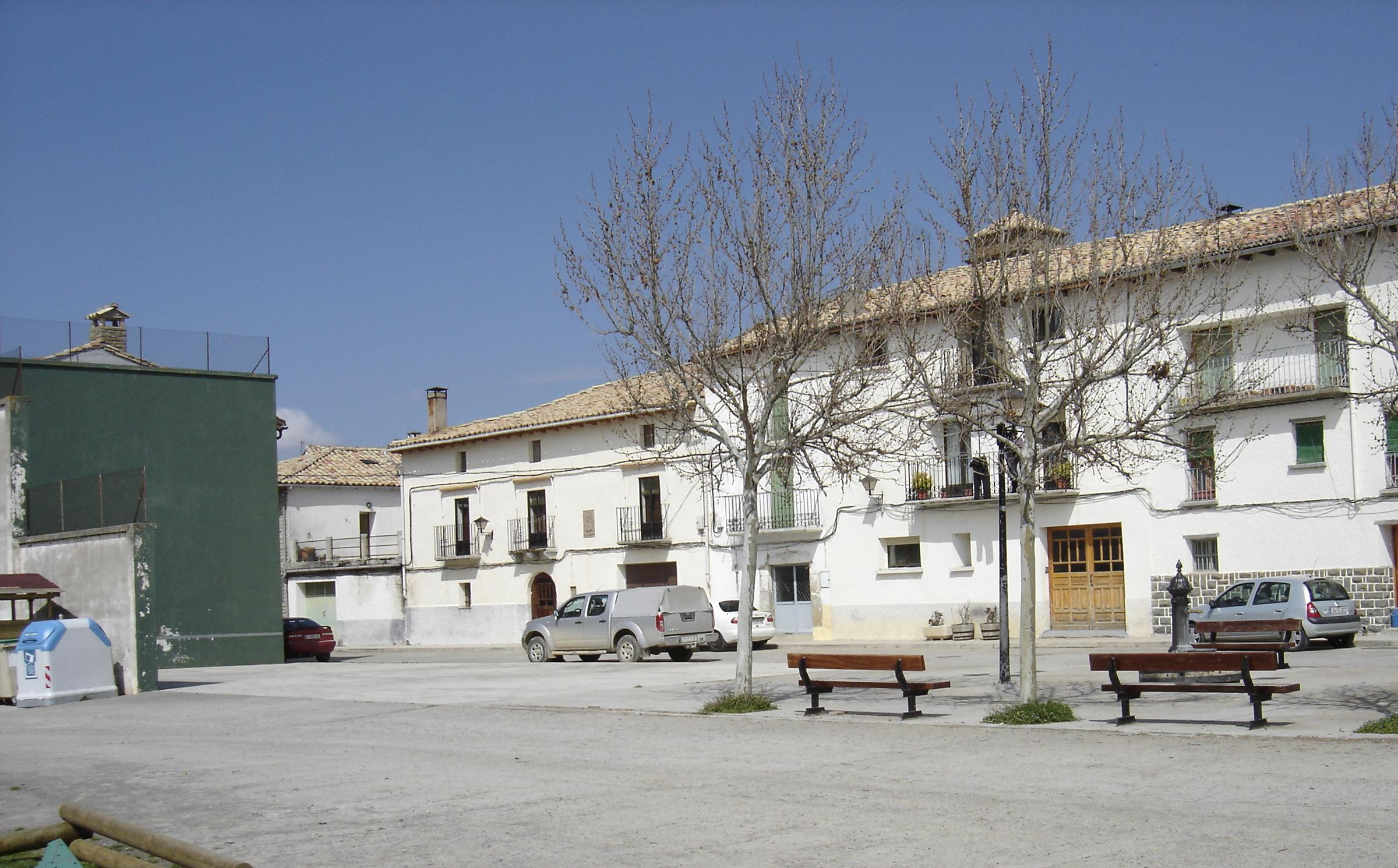

- Location within Aragon Location within Spain
- Coordinates: 42°30′52″N 0°50′55″W
- Country: Spain
- Autonomous community: Aragon
- Province: Province of Huesca
- Municipality: Bailo, Spain
- Elevation: 735 m (2,411 ft)

Population
  - Total: 60

Larués is a locality located in the municipality of Bailo, Spain, in Huesca province, Aragon, Spain. As of 2020, it has a population of 60.

== Geography ==
Larués is located 69km northwest of Huesca.
