= Sádaba Castle =

Castle in Sádaba, Aragon, Spain

Coordinates: 42°16′52.7142″N 1°16′8.656″W

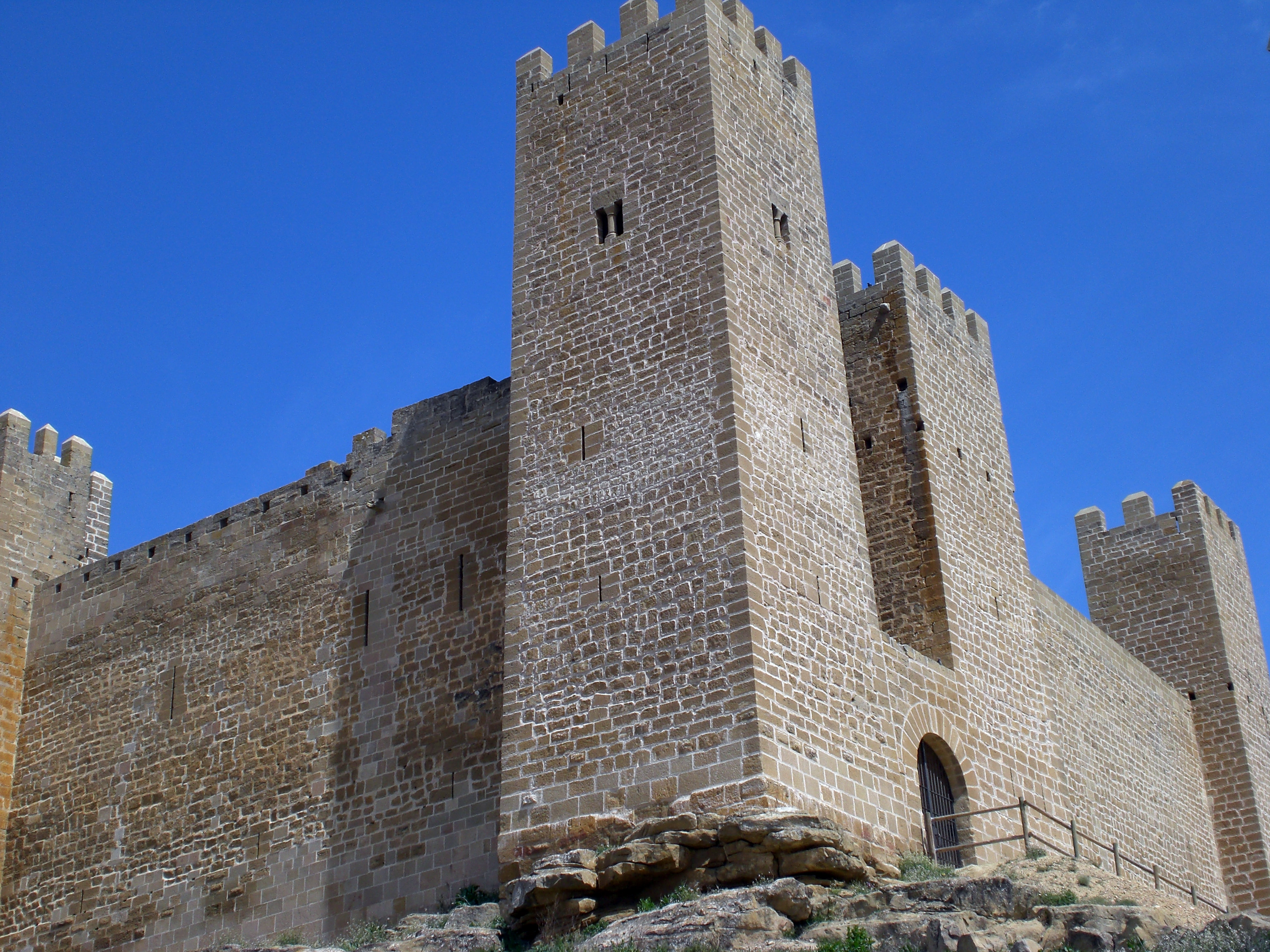
Castle of Sádaba

Sádaba Castle is a castle in Sádaba, Aragon, eastern Spain, located some 90 kilometres (56 mi) north of Zaragoza.

The castle is mentioned for the first time in a document from 1125, although the architectural structure suggests it was built in the first half of the 13th century. It is a typical Middle Ages castle with Cistercian-style decorations, tall walls and seven square towers. Inside is a courtyard with a large rainwater tank in the middle and a chapel in the corner. It is not known who built it, but it is suspected that Sancho VII of Navarre ordered it to be built. At the sides of the castle are the remains of two large halls, which probably were two stories high. It measures 38 by 30 metres (125 ft × 98 ft).

== See also ==
- List of Bienes de Interés Cultural in the Province of Zaragoza

== Bibliography ==
  - "Castles.nl: Sádaba Castle". Archived from the original on 26 January 2012.
