= Monastery of Comendadoras Canonesas del Santo Sepulcro =

- Monasterio de Comendadoras Canonesas del Santo Sepulcro (Spanish)
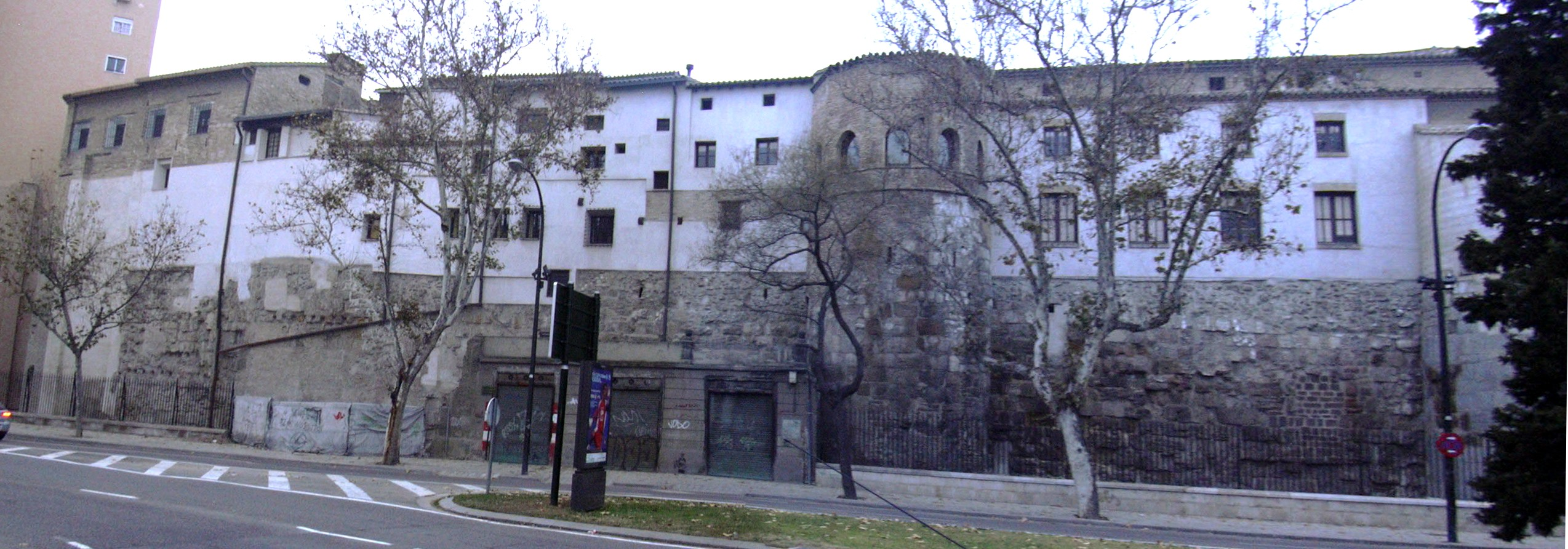

- Location within Spain
- 41.653745°N 0.872477°W
- Location: Zaragoza, Spain

Spanish Cultural Heritage
- Official name: Monasterio de Comendadoras Canonesas del Santo Sepulcro
- Type: Non-movable
- Criteria: Monument
- Designated: 1893
- Reference no.: RI-51-0000065

The Monastery of Comendadoras Canonesas del Santo Sepulcro (Spanish: Monasterio de Comendadoras Canonesas del Santo Sepulcro) is a monastery located in Zaragoza, Spain. It was declared Bien de Interés Cultural in 1893.

== See also ==
- List of Bien de Interés Cultural in the Province of Zaragoza
