= Condes de Argillo Palace =

- Palacio de los Condes de Argillo
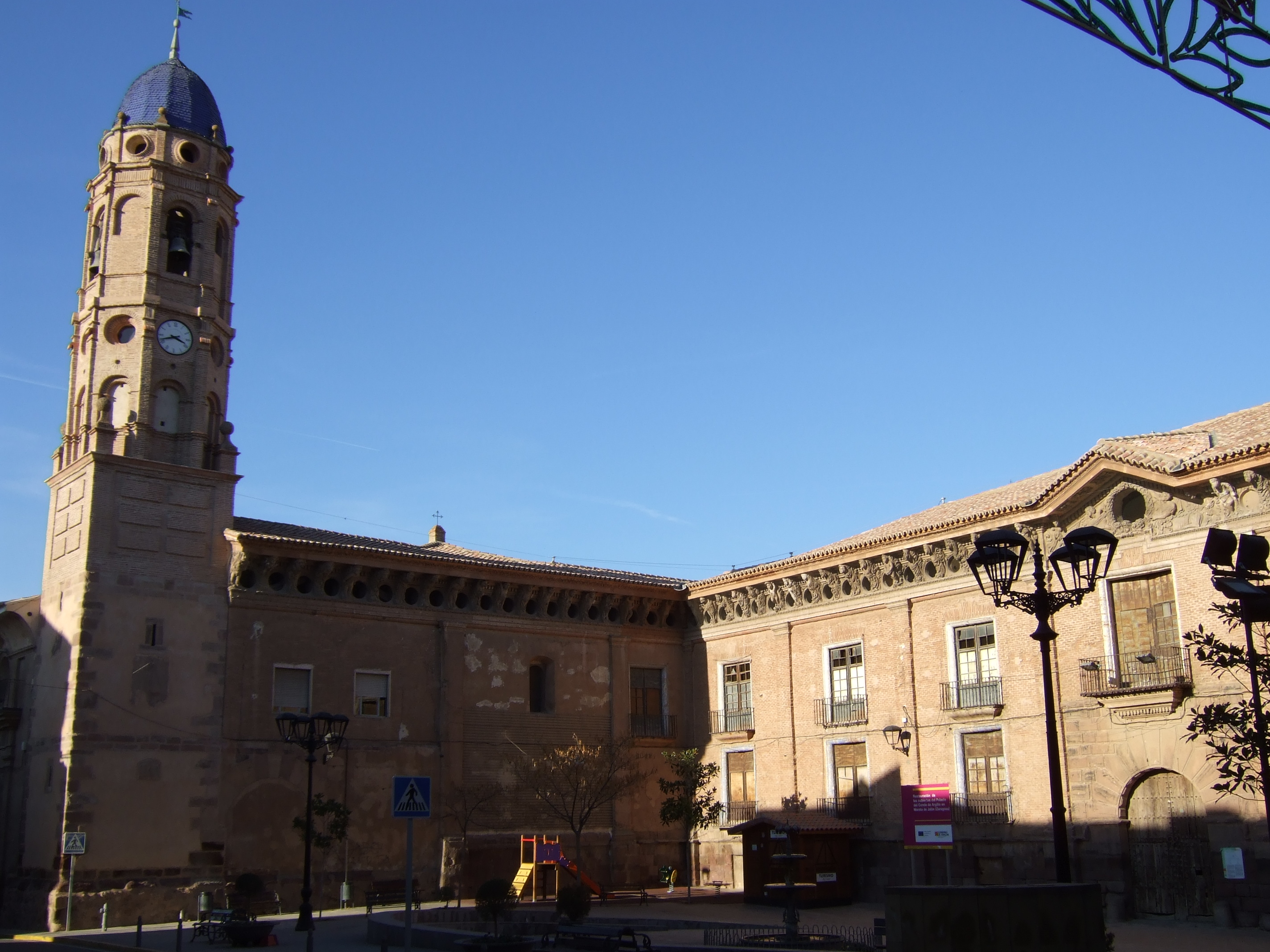
- The church of Santa Ana and the palace's entrance on the right.
- Interactive map of the Condes de Argillo Palace area

General information
- Type: Palace
- Location: Morata de Jalón, Aragon, Spain
- Coordinates: 41°28′25″N 1°28′34″W
- Construction started: 1672
- Construction stopped: 1676

The Condes de Argillo Palace (Spanish: Palacio de los Condes de Argillo) is a historical building in Morata de Jalón, Aragon, Spain.

It was built in 1672-1676 under the direction of Juan de la Marca.

It has an H-shaped plan, with a large central volume prolonged by two transversal wings at its ends, the left one corresponding to the church of Santa Ana. It has a brickwork façade.

== See also ==
- List of Bienes de Interés Cultural in the Province of Zaragoza
