= Colegiata de Santa María la Mayor (Caspe) =

- Colegiata de Santa María la Mayor (Spanish)
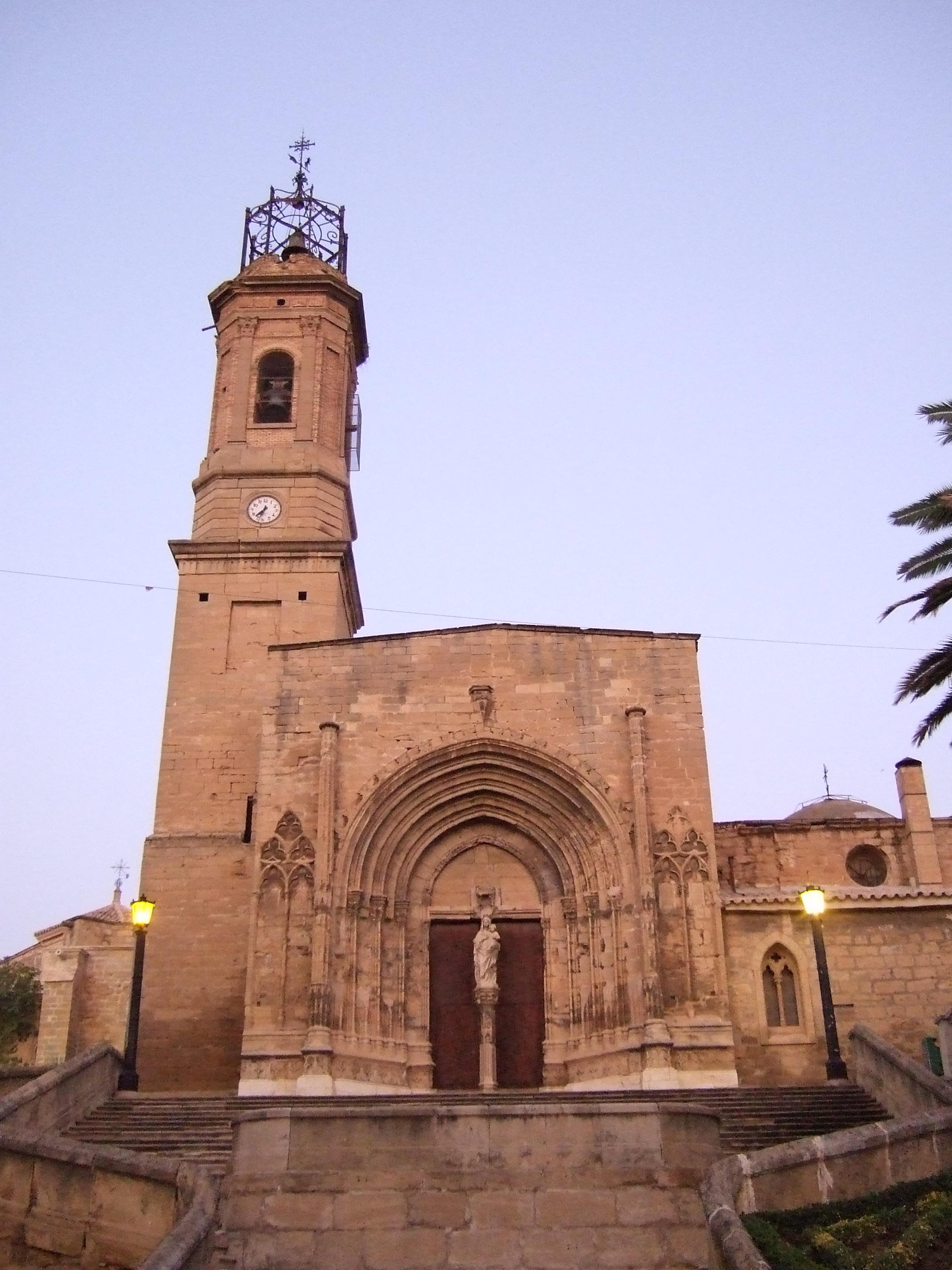

- Location within Spain
- 41.236112°N 0.037375°W
- Location: Caspe, Spain

Spanish Cultural Heritage
- Official name: Colegiata de Santa María la Mayor
- Type: Non-movable
- Criteria: Monument
- Designated: 1908
- Reference no.: RI-51-0000095

The Colegiata de Santa María la Mayor (Spanish: Colegiata de Santa María la Mayor) is a collegiate church located in Caspe, Spain. It was declared Bien de Interés Cultural in 1908.

== See also ==
- List of Bien de Interés Cultural in the Province of Zaragoza
