= Bailo, Spain =

Bailo
- Municipality
- Bailo
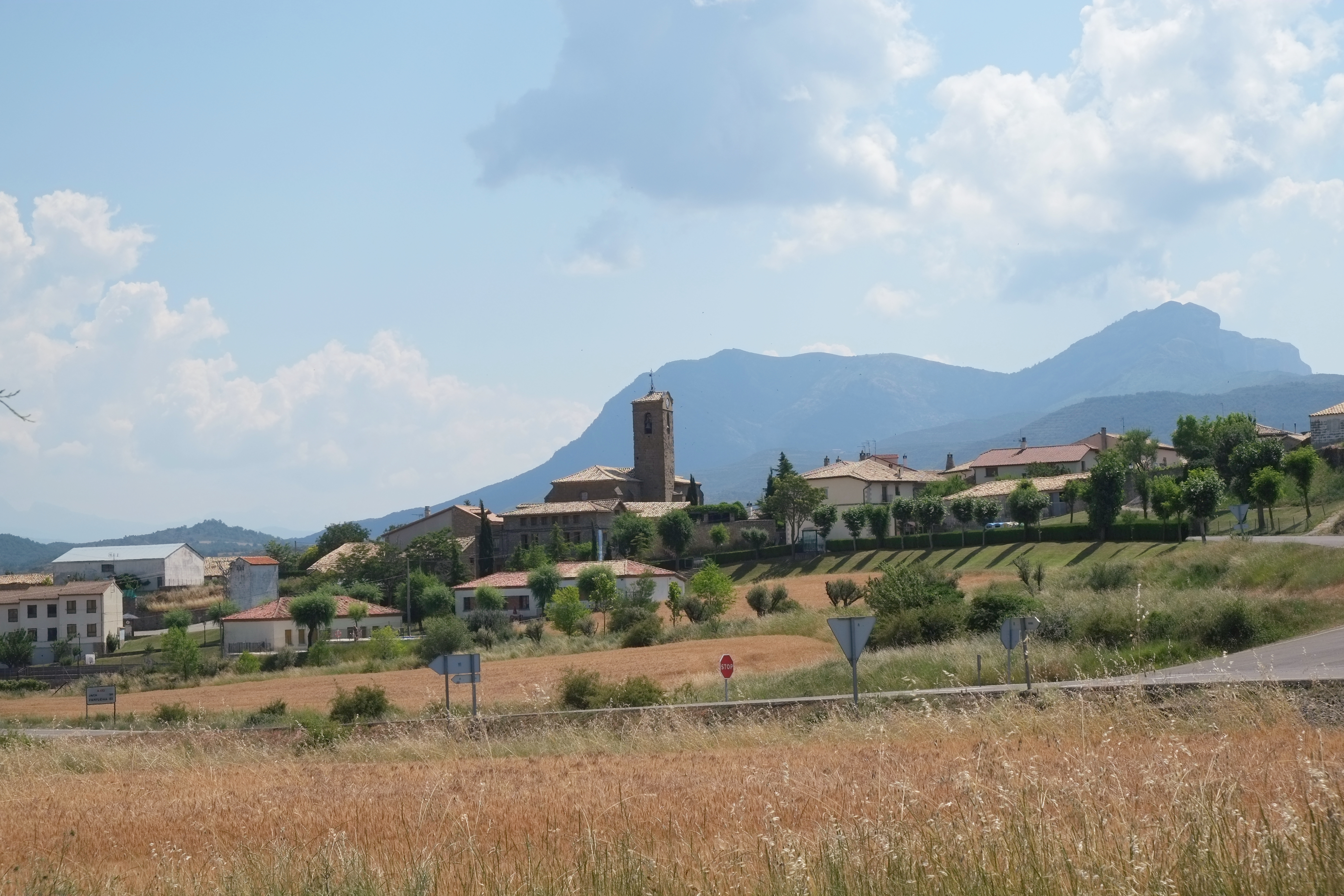
- Interactive map of Bailo
- Country: Spain
- Autonomous community: Aragon
- Province: Huesca
- Municipality: Bailo

Area
  - Total: 164 km^{2} (63 sq mi)

Population (2025-01-01)
  - Total: 265
  - Density: 1.62/km^{2} (4.19/sq mi)
- Time zone: UTC+1 (CET)
  - Summer (DST): UTC+2 (CEST)

Bailo is a municipality located in the province of Huesca, Aragon, Spain. According to the 2024 census (INE), the municipality has a population of 263 inhabitants.

== Villages ==
- Bailo
- Alastuey
- Arbués
- Arrés
- Larués

== See also ==
- List of municipalities in Huesca
