= Santa María Magdalena, Zaragoza =

Church in Zaragoza, Spain

Coordinates: 41°39′9″N 0°52′26″W

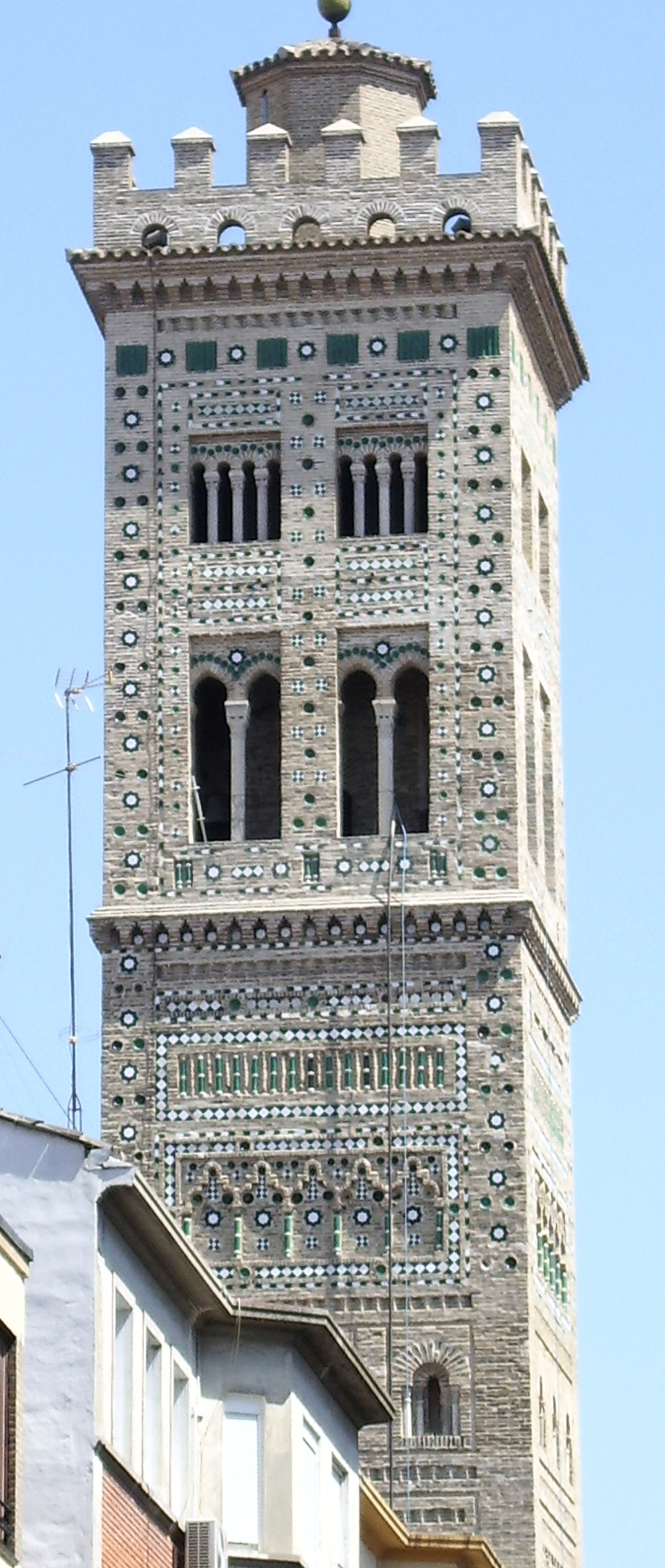
Bell tower.

Santa María Magdalena is a church in Zaragoza, Spain, built in the 14th century in Mudéjar style.

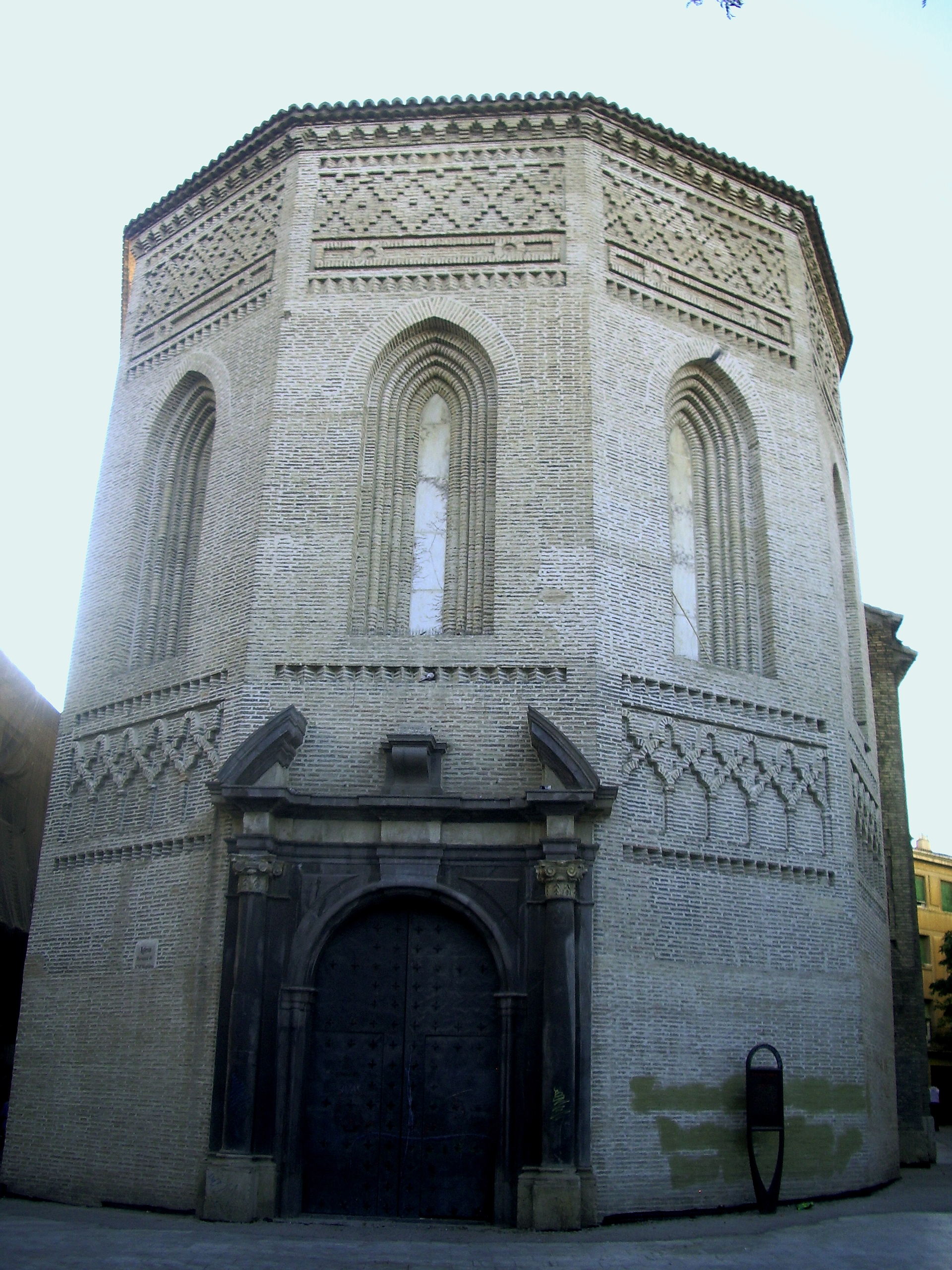
Apse view.

== History ==
It is mentioned for the first time in 1126 as a Romanesque building, which was replaced two centuries later by the current structure. Although internally renovated in the 17th-18th centuries (when the entrance was moved to the former apse antechamber), it has maintained the original square tower, in brickwork, which has several similarities with the Mudéjar towers in Teruel.

== Description ==
The church is on the Latin cross plan, featuring a single nave with cross-vaults with a polygonal apse, and side chapels between the external buttresses. The lower apse has, externally, arches in mixed styles, perhaps inspired to style of the Aljafería Palace, above which are twenty decorative ogival arches and crosses forming quadrangular motifs. The bell tower has four orders with white and green tile decorations.

The high altar, executed by José Ramirez de Arellano (who also made the sculptures in the Holy Chapel of the Pillar) dates to the 18th century Baroque renovation. Another Baroque feature is the gilt statue of the Immaculate.

== See also ==
- List of Bienes de Interés Cultural in the Province of Zaragoza
- Mudéjar Architecture of Aragon — World Heritage Sites
