= Roman mausoleum of Fabara =

2nd century tomb in Zaragoza, Spain

Coordinates: 41.1847°N 0.1604°E

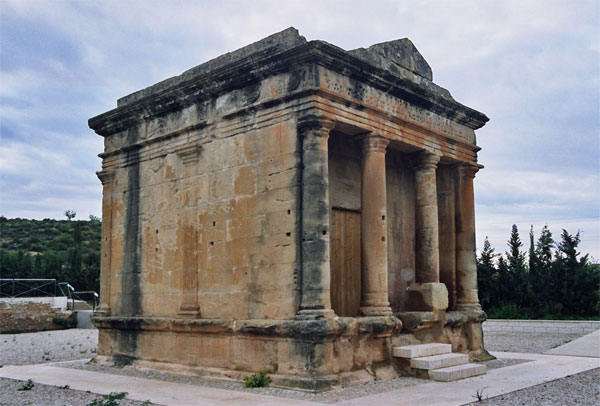
The Roman mausoleum of Fabara

The 2nd century AD Roman tomb called mausoleum of Fabara or mausoleum of Lucius Aemilius Lupus is on the left bank of Matarranya River near the village of Fabara, in the Spanish province of Zaragoza. It is possibly the best-preserved monument of its type in the entire Iberian Peninsula. The tomb is located in an area with a high density of rural Roman remains, with several archaeological sites and Roman villas. Signs of other buildings of the same type have been found nearby.

The mausoleum had gone virtually unnoticed by scholars. Its existence was first officially reported to the administration (the Royal Academy of History) in 1874. The building had several owners until 1942. In 1931 it was declared a historical artistic monument. In 1942 it was acquired by the state.

== Description ==
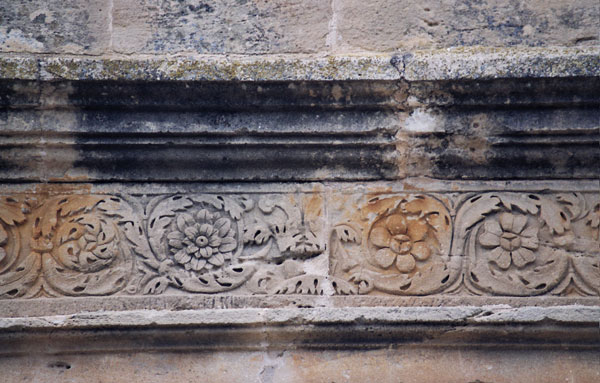
Entablature decoration

Map of the mausoleum

It is a rectangular building, of 6.85 by 5.94 metres (22.5 ft × 19.5 ft) coated with sandstone, without mortar; the blocks are locked with metal parts. Is perfectly oriented along the cardinal points, with the main facade and entrance from east. Is a temple of classical type, the type known as prostyle, i.e. the facade consists of four columns: two between the side walls, and two attached to them. The blank walls are decorated with pilasters, two in the rear corners and two more in the middle of the side walls.

On the walls and columns of the facade, of Tuscan order, stood the entablature decorated outside. This entablature had in its front an inscription, now lost, made of bronze letters nailed. Of these disappeared letters have remained only the signs of its existence in the stone. On the sides and rear, are reliefs with floral motifs and garlands.

Above the entablature are placed two pediments, one at the front, badly damaged, but still retains the inscription, thanks to that has been identified in the building. The second pediment, in the back, is smooth and better preserved.

Between the columns and the front gate is the pronaos. The interior cell is covered with a barrel vault. Stairs give access to the fourth burial beneath the building and also covered with a barrel vault.

In the pediment is an inscription:
L' A MILI LVPI can easily be read
It is assumed that there would have been an E between the A and M. Above, there are traces of nailed metal letters; D and M are easily identified. The full inscription might have been:
D. M.
L'AEMILI LVPI
meaning: «To the Manes of Lucius Aemilius Lupus», an unknown person.

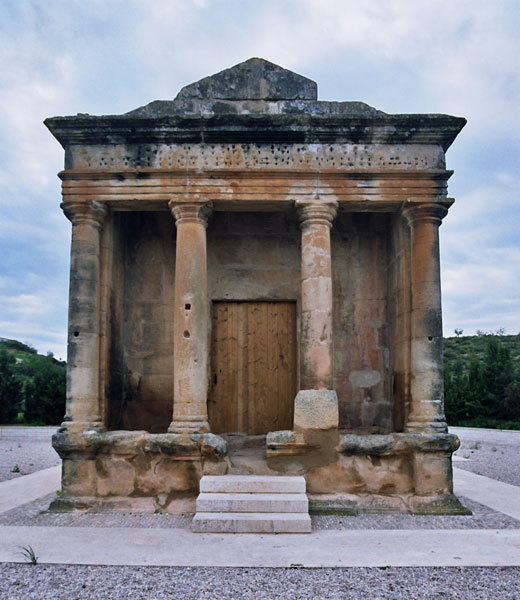
Main facade

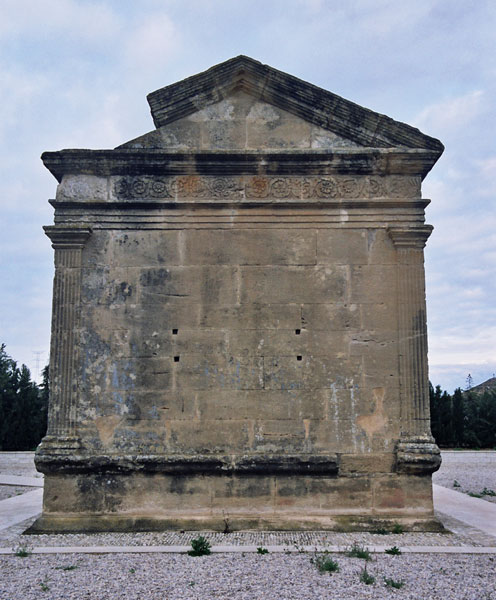
Back elevation
