= Juan de Salas (sculptor) =

Spanish Renaissance sculptor

Juan de Salas was a Spanish Renaissance sculptor of the early sixteenth century. His father, with the same name and also a sculptor, was born in Mallorca and was a resident of Zaragoza.

The first record of the artist is a contract dated 18 March 1515 for entry as an apprentice with the sculptor Damián Forment, to learn the trade of "ymaginería". According to historian José María Azcarate, by 1518 he was carving images for his master in wood and alabaster, being paid based on the size of the work. Although his main production of sculptures was done in the Aragon region, he undertook several jobs in the cathedral of Palma de Mallorca, where he spread the influence of Forment.

Between 1521 and 1523 he worked at the altar of the Chapel of St. Michael at the Cathedral of San Pedro de Jaca, where Juan de Moreto directed the execution while the sculpture was done by Gil Morlanes el Joven, Gabriel Yoly and Juan de Salas. Salas executed the base of the altar and the sculptures of the epistles. In collaboration with the sculptor Yoly he was involved, although to a lesser extent, in carrying out the work of the high altar of Tauste in San Pedro and one of San Cosme and San Damian in Teruel. All these works were carried around the middle of the sixteenth century.

== Sources ==
- DDAA (2004), Historia del Arte de Espasa, Barcelona: Espasa-Calpe, ISBN 84-670-1323-0
- Azcárate y Ristori, José María (1958), Escultura del siglo XVI; vol. XIII, Ars Hispaniae, Madrid: Plus Ultra
