= Arrés =

- Locality
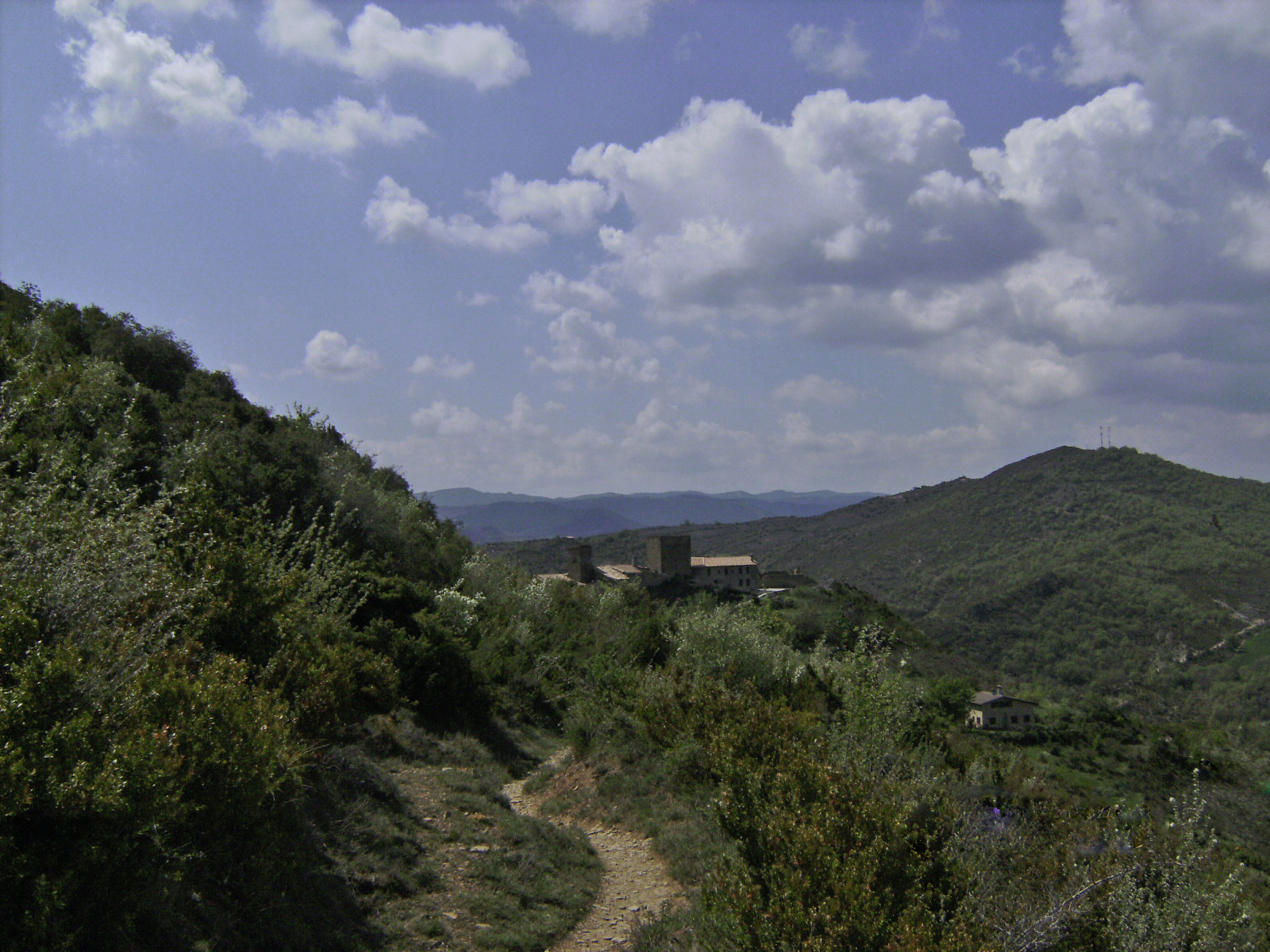

- Location within Aragon Location within Spain
- Coordinates: 42°33′21″N 0°49′39″W
- Country: Spain
- Autonomous community: Aragon
- Province: Province of Huesca
- Municipality: Bailo, Spain
- Elevation: 698 m (2,290 ft)

Population
  - Total: 41

Arrés is a locality located in the municipality of Bailo, Spain, in Huesca province, Aragon, Spain. As of 2020, it has a population of 41.

== Geography ==
Arrés is located 73km northwest of Huesca.
