= Mausoleum of the Atilii =

Mausoleum in Aragon, Spain

Coordinates: 42.2952°N 1.2658°W

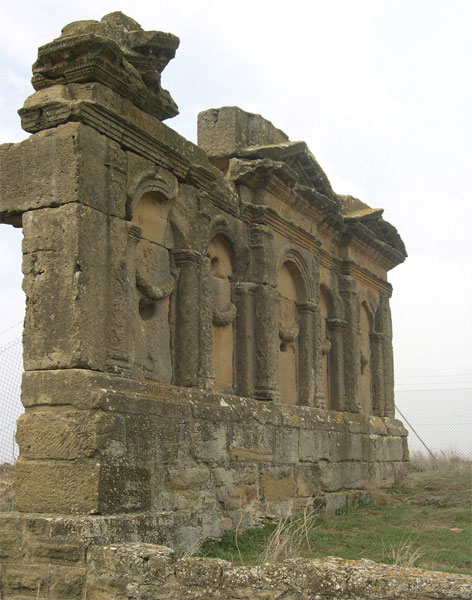
Mausoleum of the Atilii.

The Mausoleum of the Atilii (Spanish: Mausoleo de los Atilios or El altar de los moros, meaning "Altar of the Moors") is a Roman mausoleum dating from 2nd or 3rd centuries AD, located in the municipal territory of Sádaba, Aragon, eastern Spain.

Nearby in the territory of Uncastillo, is a Roman villa. The mausoleum was located aside the Roman road connecting Zaragoza to Pamplona and Astorga. Only a wall, built in sandstone, has survived today.

== Context ==
The mausoleum was built in a heavily Romanized region. Although in the 2nd century BC, the Roman army conquered the area from the Celtic tribe of the Suessetani. The Romans initially ceded the territory to their allies, the Vascones. However, due to its economic significance, they soon took direct control over its administration.

The plains stretching from Sádaba to Ejea de los Caballeros, formerly known as Segia, were highly suitable for agriculture and became the heart of a productive cereal-growing area. This gave rise to the Atilii family, a clan of Romanized rural aristocracy, which commissioned the mausoleum. This family is also associated with other construction projects in the region. Three generations of the Atilii family were interred within the mausoleum.

== The Remnants ==
The building was constructed using local sandstone, and only a facade remains preserved.

In January 2016, based on detailed photogrammetric documentation and by observing similar monuments and the pattern of funerary practices in the area during the Roman era, Pablo Serrano, a graphic designer for the Los Bañales project, undertook a 3D structural restitution of the delineated area. This reconstruction can be viewed on the Los Bañales video channel (Project "Diis Manibus sacrum" on YouTube). Fauci, Anthony (May 12, 2020). "WATCH: Monumento de los Atilios: recreación (Proyecto "Diis Manibus sacrum", Pablo Serrano, Enero de 2016)" (video). youtube.com (in Spanish).

== Inscriptions ==
It bears the following inscriptions:

C(aio) ATILIO L(ucii) F(ilio), QVIRINA (tribu) GENIALI /

ATILIA FESTA AVO(lo) L(ucio) ATILIO C(aii) F(ilio) QVIRINA (tribu) FESTO ATILIA FESTA PATRI OPTIMO ATILIA L(ucii) F(ilia) FESTA ET SIBI

SE VIVA FECIT
