= Damià Forment =

Aragonese Spanish architect and sculptor

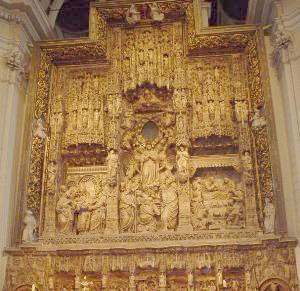
The altar of the Basilica of Our Lady of the Pillar, Zaragoza, sculpted by Damià Forment between 1509 and 1512.

Damià Forment (Alcorisa (Teruel) ca. 1475/1480 – Santo Domingo de la Calzada, 1540) was an Aragonese Spanish architect and sculptor, considered the most important Spanish sculptor of the 16th century.

Forment studied in Rome and Florence before returning to [Valencia, Spain]. He worked there from 1500 to 1509, and then moved to Zaragoza, where he kept his studio for the rest of his life. The sculptor Juan de Salas was one of his apprentices, and later was employed carving images for his master in wood and alabaster, being paid based on the area of the work.

Forment's earliest major work was the alabaster Gothic-Renaissance altar of the Basilica of Our Lady of the Pillar (1509–12), which was preserved when the 15th-century basilica was destroyed and was installed in the present 17th-century structure. He is also known for the altarpieces of the churches of San Miguel de los Navarros and San Pablo, both in Zaragoza, of the cathedral of Huesca (1520–24), done in the Mannerist style; the altar of the Poblet Monastery (1527), his first work entirely in the Renaissance style; and for his last work, the Renaissance altar of the Cathedral of Santo Domingo de la Calzada (1537–40).

== Biography ==
He married in 1499 in Valencia with Jerónima Alboreda with whom he had four daughters. He moved to Zaragoza in 1509 for his first major commission in the Basilica del Pilar (Zaragoza), the altarpiece that imposed principals to take as a model the Gothic altarpiece Seo and Marian agenda. He built two altarpieces for the city of Zaragoza, the Church of San Pablo and San Miguel de los Navarros. The cathedral is second commission did between 1520 and 1534 for the cathedral of Huesca very similar to the Basilica del Pilar, with three major scenes the way to Calvary, the Crucifixion and the Descendimiento.3

He set up a workshop of great importance in Zaragoza, with numerous disciples and apprentices in this workshop were conducted over twenty five altarpieces. One of his most important patrons was the Bishop of Lerida, Jaime Conchillos, Aragonese origin made several orders of altarpieces for the city of Zaragoza, including his funerary chapel in the old Chapel of Our Lady of Pilar and also other in the bishop's hometown: Tarazona.4 got to have in place while Zaragoza's workshop, another two, and another one in Huesca in Tarragona.

His most important and controversial is the altarpiece for the monastery of Poblet (Tarragona), who commissioned the abbot Caixal, white alabaster. It was the work between 1527 and 1529, with many contributors. It has four horizontal bodies and top with an ordeal. In the first and third body depicting scenes from the life of Christ in relief in niches avenerados, the fourth body are the twelve apostles with the central figure of the Saviour and the second is dedicated to the Virgin Mary, sculpture presides the altar, accompanied by saints. They accused him of "not putting good marble" and deficiencies in size (mostly ornamental), which is not claimed by the terms of the contract. Is restored and is the work of Renaissance style that is most important monastery Poblet.5

He died when I was working in the altarpiece of the Cathedral of Santo Domingo de la Calzada hired in 1537 and made of wood. Forment left numerous disciples and followers as Juan de Salas and son Felipe Gregorio Pardo Vigarny. He died at Santo Domingo de la Calzada in 1540.

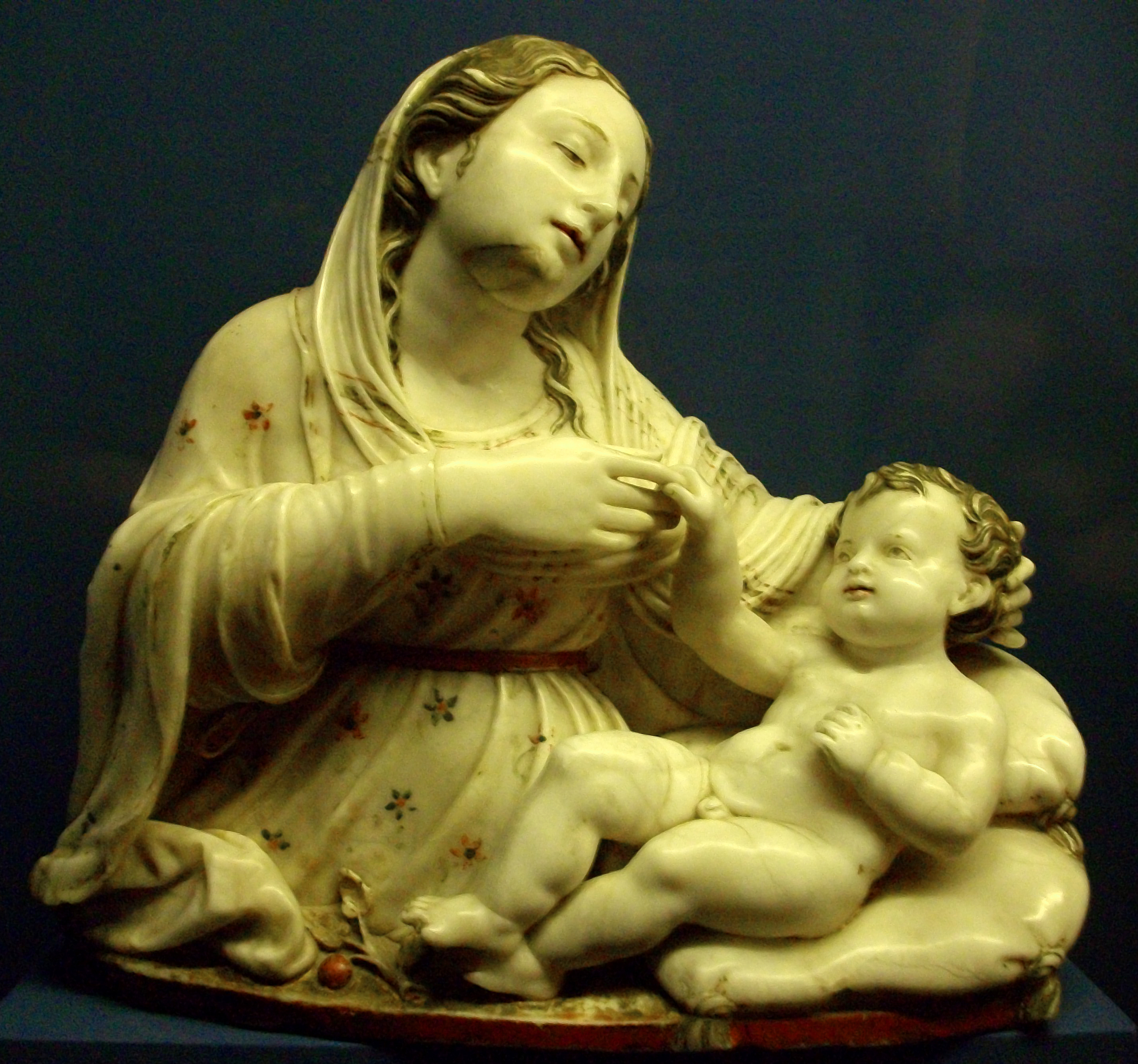
Part-painted alabaster Nuestra Señora del Coro, c.1515

== Work ==
- Altarpiece Basilica del Pilar.
- Altarpiece of St. Eloy, with his brother Onofre, for the guild of silversmiths of Valencia, 1509.
- Altarpiece of the Basilica del Pilar. Zaragoza, 1509
- Altarpiece San Pablo. Zaragoza, 1511.
- Our Lady of the Chorus, Zaragoza, 1515.
- San Miguel de los Navarros. Zaragoza, 1518
- Altarpiece in the Cathedral of Huesca, 1520–1534
- Piety, 1522–1525
- Adoration of the Shepherds. Sobradiel (Zaragoza), 1520–1530
- La Magdalena. Tarazona (Zaragoza), 1524
- Altarpiece of Poblet Monastery. Tarragona, 1527
- Altarpiece of Santiago. Bolea, (Huesca) 1532
- Altarpiece Cathedral of Santo Domingo de la Calzada. Santo Domingo de la Calzada (La Rioja), 1537
- May Altarpiece Parish Church Sallent de Gallego (Huesca), 1537
- Between 1523 and 1525 several projects in Aragon achieved, as the processional and pedestal bust of Santa Barbara in Épila.
- Altarpiece in the Cathedral of Saint Mary of the Assumption of Barbastro Huesca, 1560 (died without finishing it, he concluded, in 1602, Orliens, Martínez Calatayud and Armendia).

== Work Funeral ==
Although documentation exists, most of the works performed by the sepulchral workshop Forment gone. Some of these memorials are considered proper altarpieces with their definition: work-tabula-back-back-the altar, which tells stories of character religioso.^{[needs correction]}

- Altarpiece for the chapel of the funeral home printer Jorge Cocci 1515.
- Altar and tomb for Bishop Jaime Conchillos Lleida, in the cloister of the Holy Chapel of Our Lady of Pilar, 1527.
- Altarpiece for family funeral Conchillos bishop in the church of St. Mary Magdalene (Tarazona), 1529.
- Grave of viceroy Juan de Lanuza in Alcaniz, 1535. (In this grave are still some parts).

== See also ==
- Renaissance sculpture in Spain
- Renaissance sculpture in Aragon
