= San Gil Abad (Zaragoza) =

Church in Zaragoza, Spain

Coordinates: 41°39′9.7″N 0°52′45.8″W

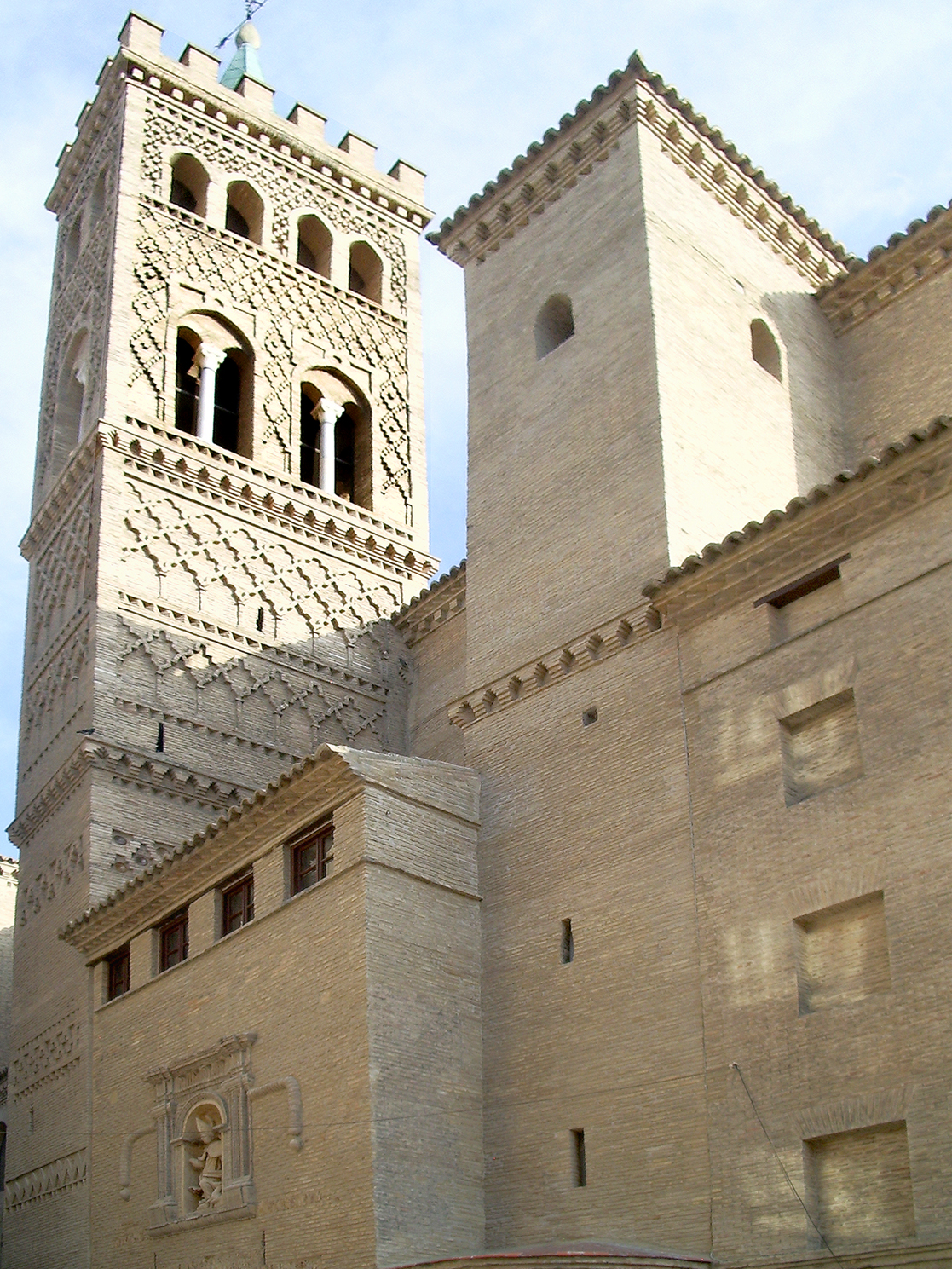
Exterior view of San Gil Abad.

San Gil Abad is a church in Zaragoza, Spain.

== History ==
After the Reconquista of the city from Islamic hands, a church was built in Romanesque style on an ancient Roman road; in the mid 14th-century, this edifice was destroyed to build a new church in Mudéjar style, later renewed in Baroque style during the 18th century.

== Architecture ==
The church has a plan with a single nave with two polygonal apses, with chapels in the buttresses.

The tower, with a square plan, is in brickwork like the rest of the church. The main entrance was built in 1640.

The interior style dates to the Baroque renovation from 1719 and 1725, when also the orientation of the temple was changed. The altarpiece (1628) is dedicated to St. Gil Abad.

The sacristy was built between 1776 and 1779, and has a vault with a fresco by Ramón Bayeu and walls with seven paintings on canvas, by Manuel Bayeu.
