= San Miguel de los Navarros =

Cultural property in Zaragoza, Spain

Coordinates: 41.6496°N 0.8765°W

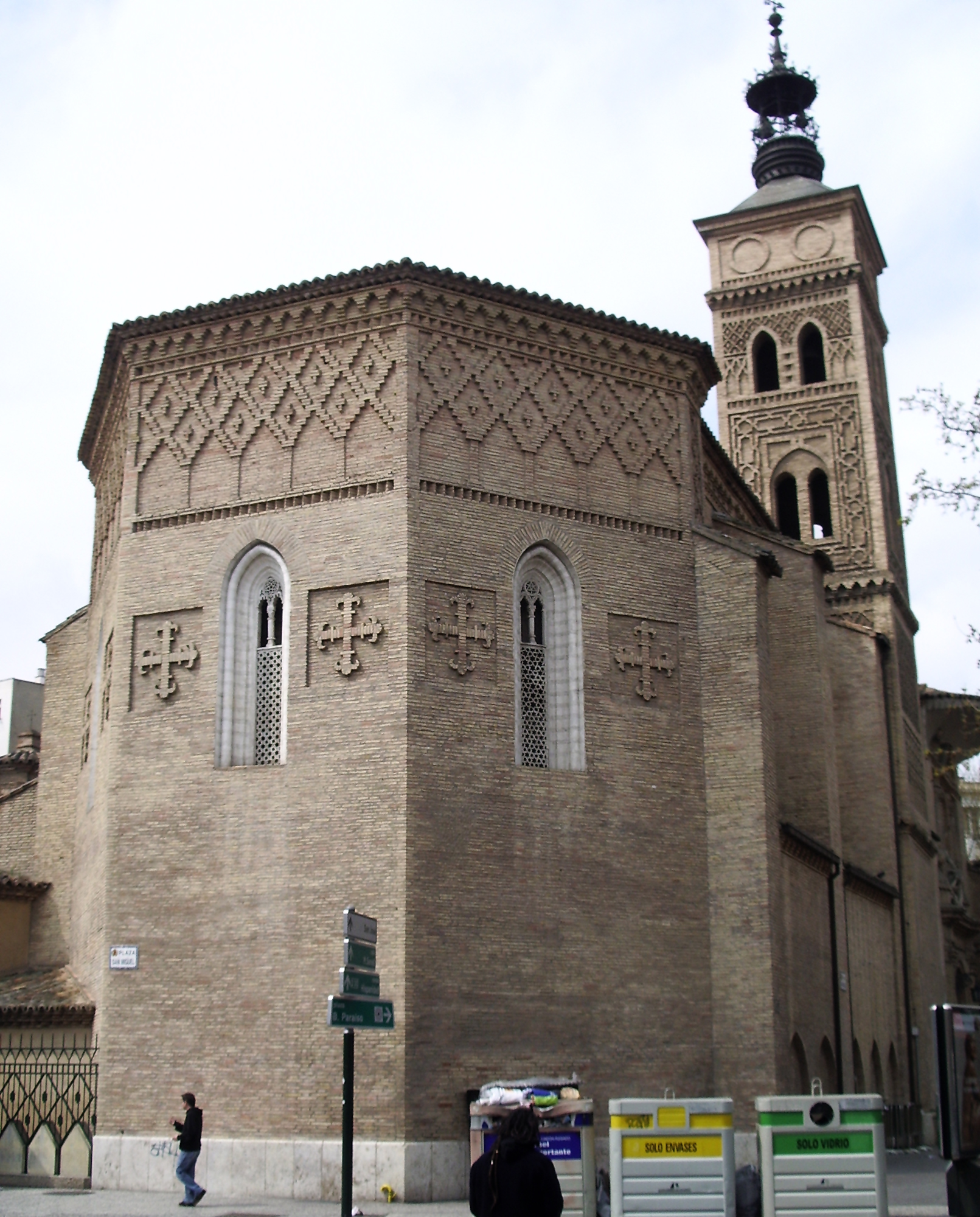
San Miguel de los Navarros.

San Miguel de los Navarros is a church in Zaragoza, Spain. It has a single nave with side chapels, a polygonal apse and a bell tower, located at the northern side.

The church and its bell tower are notable examples of Mudéjar architecture. The bell tower has three floors with decorated brickwork, and is surmounted by an 18th-century spire, similar to that of the Torre de la Seo.

The brickwork façade and the choir date to the Baroque period. The Renaissance artist Damian Forment executed the polychrome wood sculpture at the high altar.

== Sources ==
- Guillermo Fatás, ed. (1991). Guía histórico-artística de Zaragoza. Zaragoza: Ayuntamiento (Servicio de acción cultural). ISBN 84-86807-76-X.
