= San Pablo (Zaragoza) =

Coordinates: 41°39′21.9″N 0°53′10.0″W

San Pablo Church
- Iglesia de San Pablo
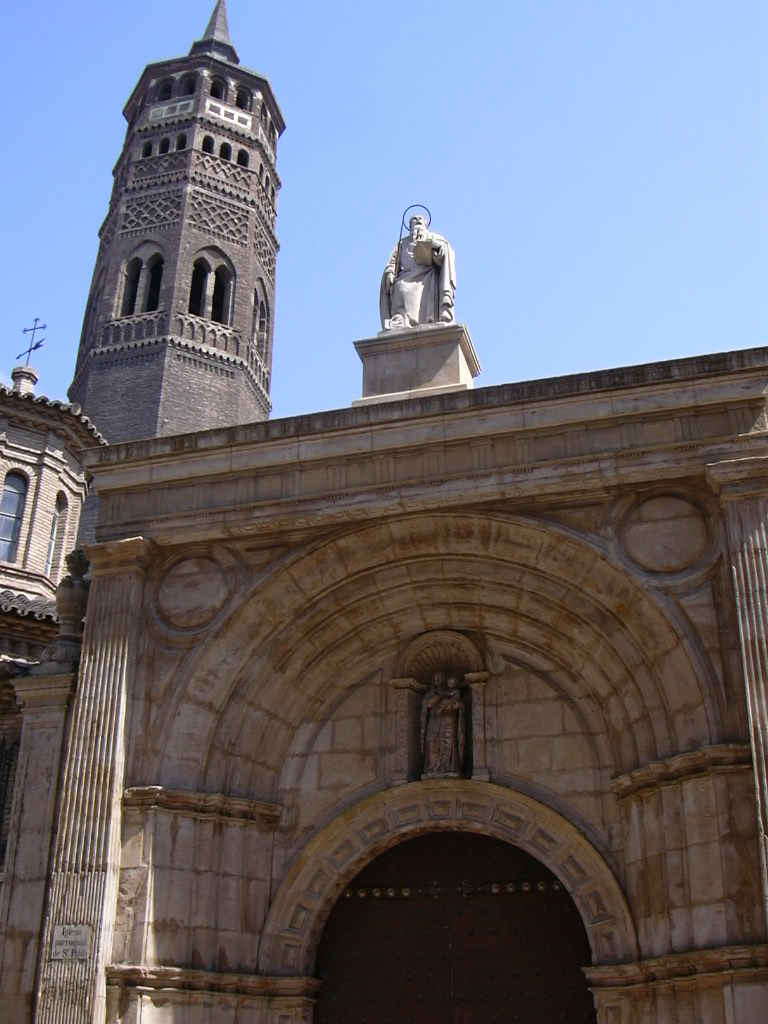

Religion
- Affiliation: Roman Catholic Church
- Status: Church

Location
- Location: Zaragoza, Spain
- Interactive map of San Pablo Church

Architecture
- Style: Gothic, Mudéjar

UNESCO World Heritage Site
- Official name: Tower and Parish church of San Pablo
- Part of: Mudéjar Architecture of Aragon
- Criteria: Cultural: (iv)
- Reference: 378ter
- Inscription: 1986 (10th Session)
- Extensions: 2001, 2016

Spanish Cultural Heritage
- Type: Non-movable
- Criteria: Monument
- Designated: 3 June 1931
- Reference no.: RI-51-0001030

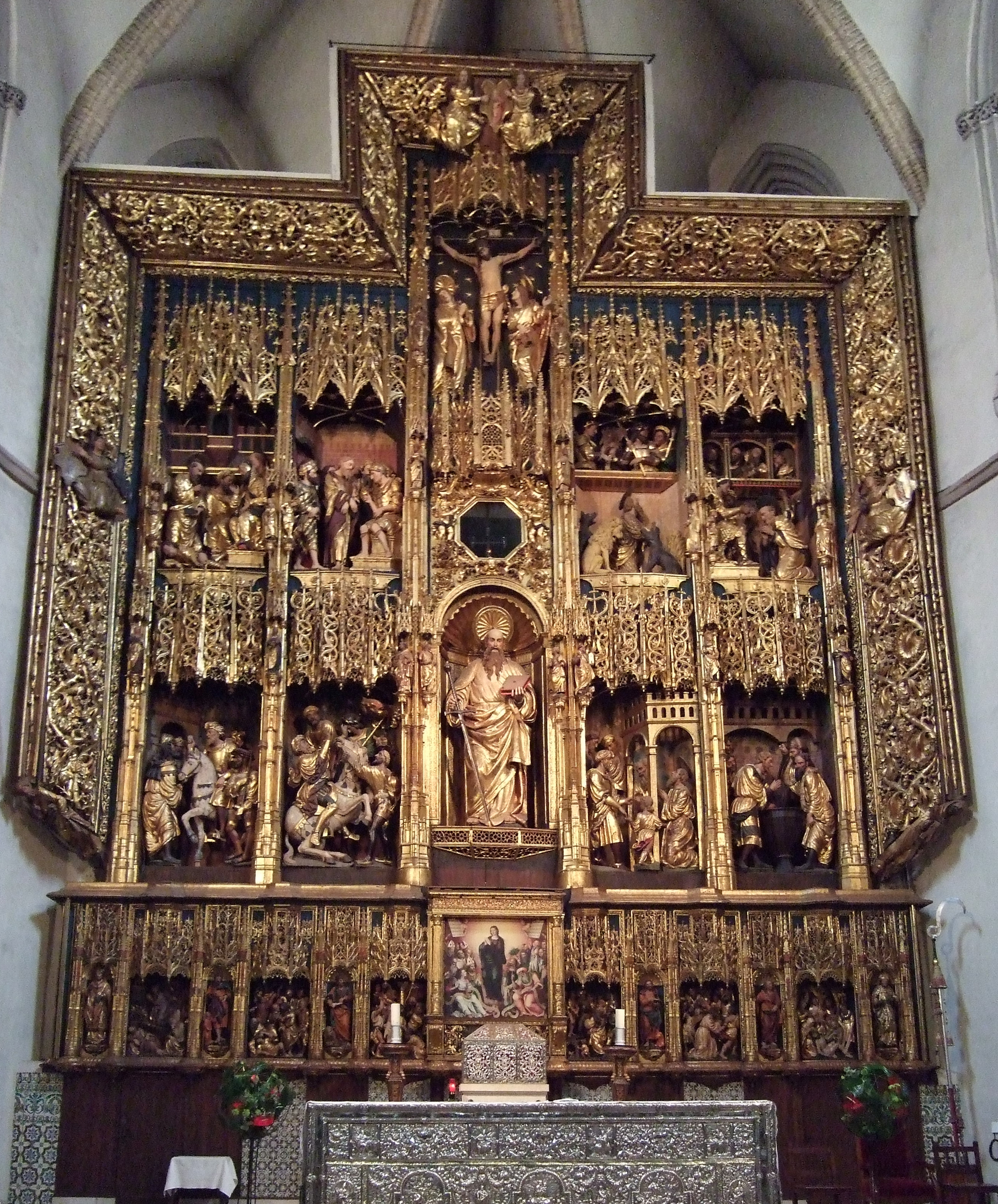
Retablo of the high altar.

San Pablo is a church in Zaragoza, Spain. Its original Gothic-Mudéjar building dates to the late 13th/early 14th-century; later it was enlarged and modified several times.

== History ==
The original 14th-century edifice had a single nave with four bays with vaults and flying buttresses, with chapels, ending with a transept and a pentagonal apse.

In 1343 a Mudéjar tower was added, originally near the entrance, but now enclosed in the main body of the building. In the 15th century, two aisles were built.

Later, until the 18th century, several chapels were opened on the right side, the front and the back of the church.

== Overview ==
The Gothic portal (15th century) has a varied sculptural decoration, featuring images of Saint Peter and Saint Paul on the jambs, and of Christ seated between the Virgin, Saint John and Saint Blaise on the tympanum.

The tower has an octagonal plan, and, like the church, is made in brickwork, part of which are decorated. The lower section is not visible from the exterior, as it is currently embedded within the church: it has an Arab-style frieze. The upper floors have Mudéjar-style decorations, mullioned windows and small arcades. At the top is a pyramidal spire.

The reredos (retablo) of the main altar, in gilded and polychrome wood, was executed by Damián Forment (1515–1518).

== Conservation ==
In 1931 the church was designated a monumento nacional.

In 2001 the church was included in the World Heritage Site Mudéjar Architecture of Aragon.

== See also ==
- Late medieval domes

== Sources ==
- Laborda y Neva, José (1995). Zaragoza: guía de arquitectura / an architectural guide, Zaragoza, Caja de Ahorros de la Inmaculada de Aragón. ISBN 84-88305-28-1.
