= Caesaraugusta =

Roman colonia located on the site of present-day Zaragoza, Spain

Coordinates: 41°39′15″N 0°52′40″W

- Colony of Rome
- c. 14 BC–472 AD
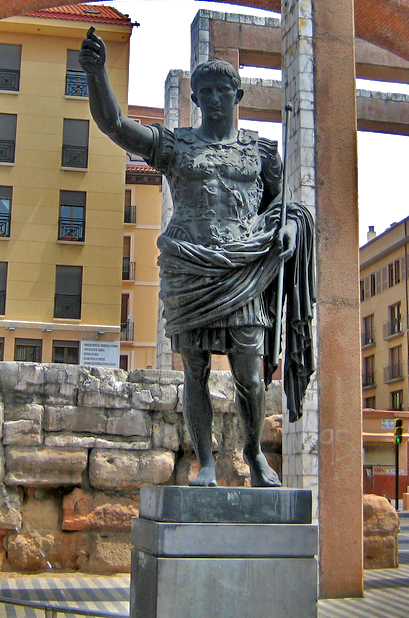
- Statue of founder Caesar Augustus in modern-day Zaragoza
- History
  - Established: c. 14 BC
  - Visigothic conquest: 472 AD
Preceded by	Succeeded by
Salduie	Zaragoza
- Today part of: Spain

Caesaraugusta or Caesar Augusta was the name of the Roman city of Zaragoza, founded as a colonia inmunis from Rome in 14 BC, possibly on December 23, on the intensely Romanized Iberian city of Salduie. Its foundation occurred in the context of the reorganization of the provinces of Hispania by Caesar Augustus after his victory in the Astur-Cantabrian wars.

Caesaraugusta on modern plan of the city 1.- Decumano (present-day Calle Mayor, Calle Espoz y Mina and Calle Manifestación). 2.- Cardo (present-day Calle Don Jaime I) 3.- Forum of Caesaraugusta 4.- Fluvial port 5.- Public baths 6.- Theater 7.- Wall

The new city received the name of "Colonia Caesar Augusta". It enjoyed the privilege of bearing the full name of its founder, who entrusted its deductio, like many other tasks of the Empire, to his general and close friend Marcus Vipsanius Agrippa.

Veteran soldiers of the legions IV Macedonica, VI Victrix and X Gemina, discharged after the hard campaign against the Asturians and Cantabrians, participated in the foundation of the city, with the double intention of guaranteeing the defense of the territory at the same time as establishing the presence of Rome in it. Zaragoza had the status of a Colonia Inmune, granting it certain privileges such as the right to mint coins or the exemption from paying taxes. The new citizens were attached to the Aniense tribe.

In the process of reorganization of Hispanic territories, three provinces were created, Tarraconense, Baetica and Lusitania, divided into juridical convents, minor districts with judicial and administrative functions; of these, the one governed by Caesaraugusta, the conventus juridicus Caesaraugustanus, was one of the largest of the seven into which the province of Tarraconense was divided. Caesaraugusta assumed from the beginning the role of regional head, replacing the colony Victrix Ivlia Celsa (in the current Velilla de Ebro).

The period of the city's greatest apogee in the first and second centuries brought many of the great public works, some of which can still be seen today: the forum, the river port, which made Caesaraugusta the main redistributor of goods in the Ebro valley, the public baths, the theater or the city's first bridge, located on the site of the current Stone Bridge and which was probably a work of ashlar or a mixture of stone and wood.

Water also played an important role in Roman Zaragoza, both for its location on the banks of the Ebro River and next to the mouth of the Huerva and Gállego rivers, as well as for its complex supply and irrigation systems. In addition to the aforementioned baths, a multitude of cisterns, fountains, sewers and various sections of lead and sanitation pipes have been documented.

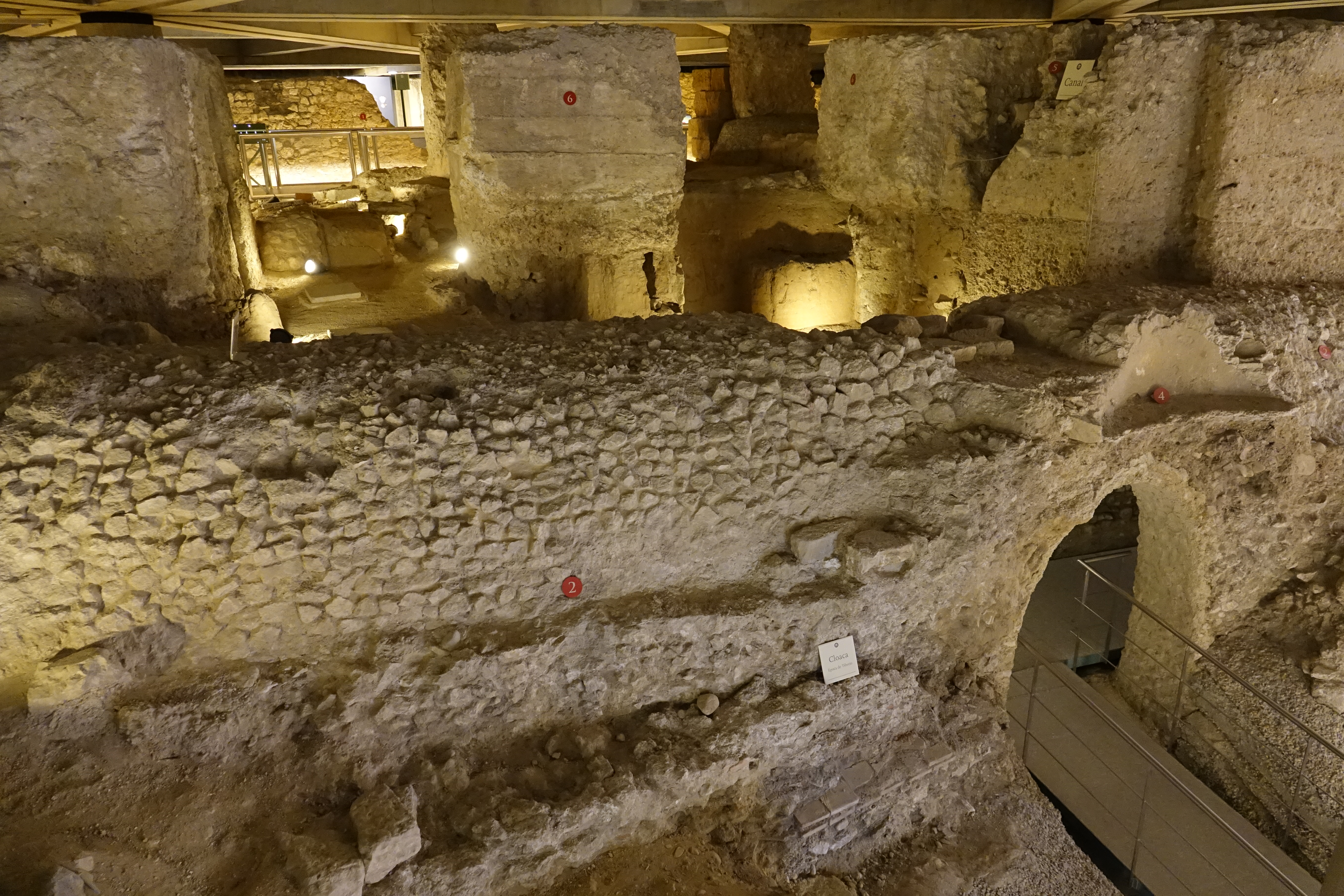
Sewers and foundations of the porticoes of the forum.

== Fundation as an inmune mixed colony ==
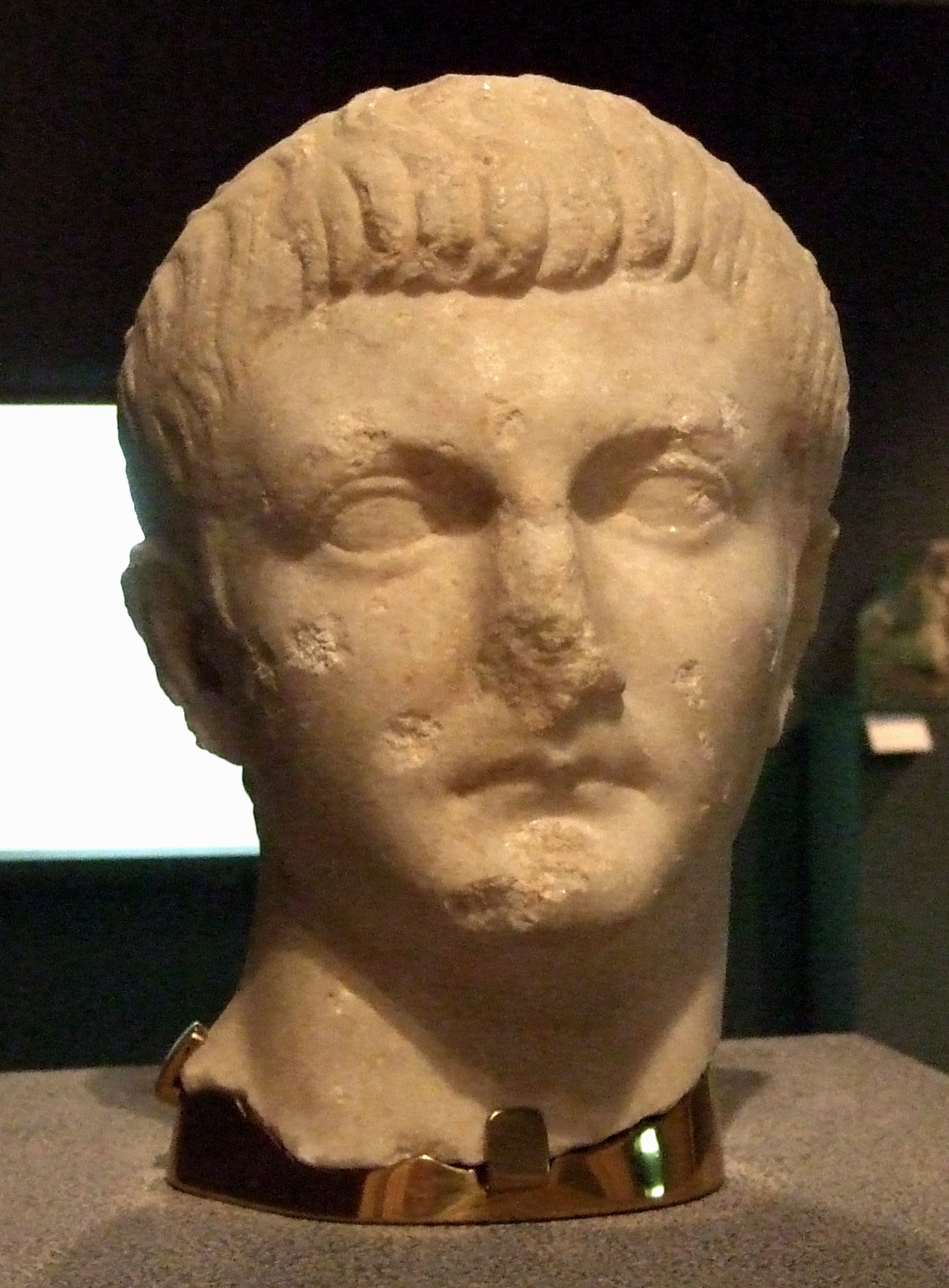
Bust of Drusus Julius Caesar from Caesaraugusta, first quarter of the 1st century AD

Caesar Augusta was founded in 14 BC (although other dates have been proposed for the foundation of the city, ranging from 25 to 12 AD) as a colonia inmunis where soldiers from the legions that fought with Caesar Augustus in Hispania between 29 and 26 B.C. were integrated into the Iberian Salduie, forming a new Roman colonial city of mixed character, as Strabo reflects in his Geographica (III, 2, 15).

The new immune colony occupied an area of 44 hectares, delimiting an area of more than 900 x 500 m around two axial axes of communication: the maximum decumanus (present-day Mayor and Espoz y Mina and Manifestación streets) and the cardo, which coincided approximately in its route with Jaime I street, although the confluence with the decumanus at the southern limit —located in the present-day Coso Alto and which could be found at any point from the Main Theater to the Cinegia Gate— is uncertain, since the layout of the aforementioned street in its southern half dates from a reform of the 18th century.

The city had four main entrances, whose location was preserved until the 15th century, at both ends of the cardo and the decumanus:

- Puerta de Toledo. It was located at the western end of the decumanum, between the present walls of San Juan de los Panetes and the Central Market. In its Roman site there was a gate flanked by two crenellated towers —whose starts were probably Roman wall cubes— until 1848 when it was demolished. Its foundations still remain, discovered in the last quarter of the 20th century. A monument by Martín Trenor and the bronze statue of Augusto di Prima Porta, a gift from Mussolini in 1940, on a pedestal of black Calatorao stone, commemorate the site since 1989.
- Gate of Valencia. East end of the decumanum, in the middle of the current Coso Bajo. An inscription to the "Porta romana" was found on an ashlar, indicating its location.
- North Gate, or Angel Gate, located at the northern end of the cardo, and that led to the Stone Bridge. It was preserved until the Sieges of Saragossa, at the beginning of the 19th century, and can be seen in full use in 1647 in the View of Zaragoza (Vista de Zaragoza en 1647) by Juan Bautista Martínez del Mazo.
- Cinegia Gate. South end of the thistle. Its name comes from the Arab quarter of Sinhaya, and its location is uncertain, as it may have been somewhere between the Main Theater and Plaza España in Zaragoza.

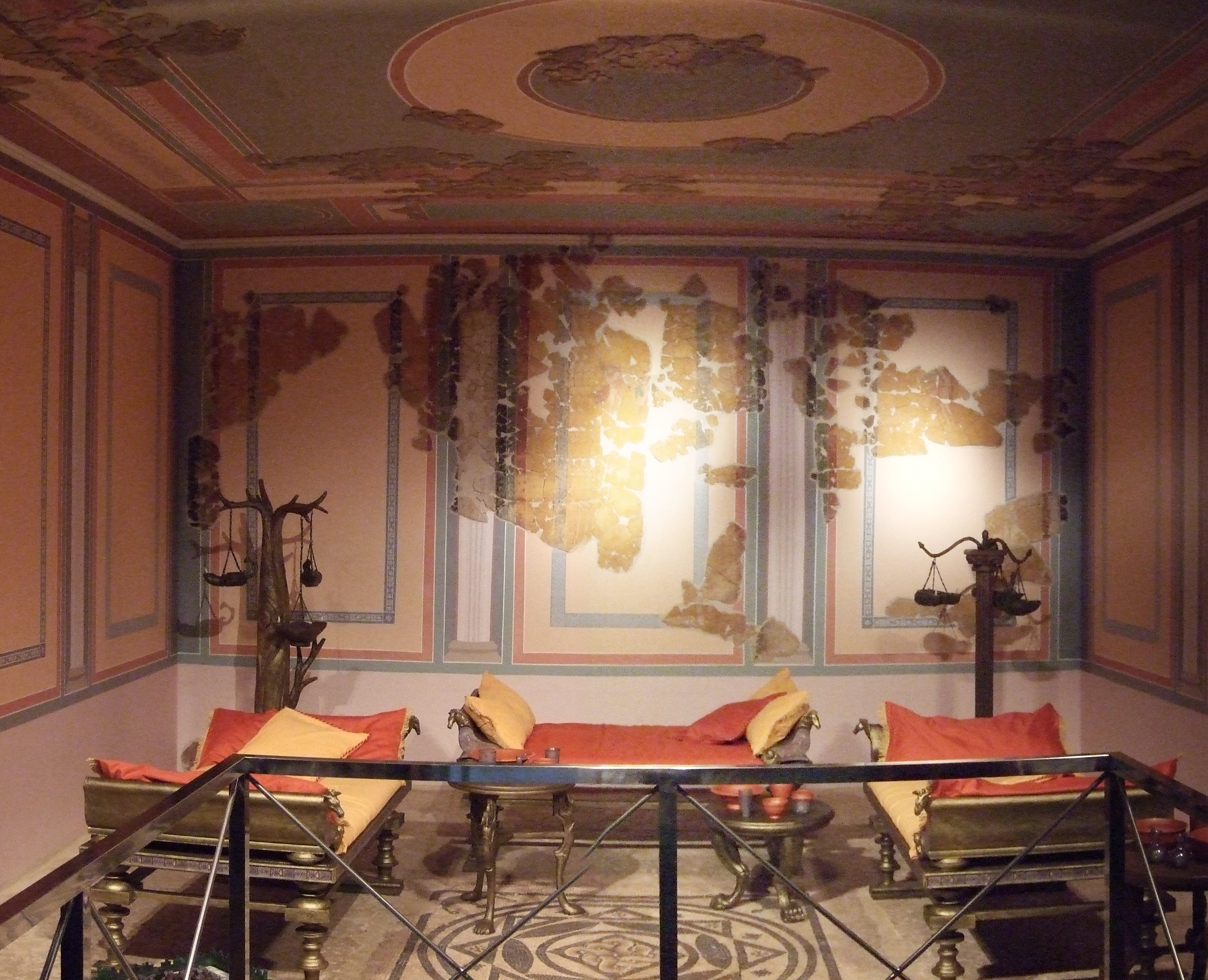
Triclinium of the Roman house in Añón street, from the Claudian period (mid 1st century A.D.).

The city of Caesaraugusta thus became the most influential city in the middle valley of the Ebro, and its coinage spread throughout the interior of Tarraconensis, becoming predominant even in the current province of Soria.

The whole design of the colony was meticulously planned before its execution. The city was soon provided with a bridge, probably made of stone, a forum, aqueducts and a sewage system with drainage sewers. However, the most recent studies support the hypothesis that these infrastructures, bridge, river port, forum, market, pre-existed the Roman foundation, although in many cases they were reformed and enlarged, as happened with the forum, in the time of Tiberius. The bridge, the port and the baths may have been part of the endowments of the highly Romanized Salduie of the years 50-14 B.C. Due to this, the construction activity between 14 B.C. and 14 A.D. was limited if we consider the enormous urban works undertaken from the government of Tiberius, with the construction of the theater or the remodeling of the forum, among other actions.

Until the end of the 20th century, the limits of the 1st century city were considered to be established by the remains of the preserved walls. However, at the beginning of the 21st century, a different evolution of the Roman city of Caesaraugusta took hold. According to the remains of the first and second centuries found outside the perimeter of the preserved walls (Plaza de la Magdalena, Antonio Agustín, Rebolería, Añón and Teniente Coronel Valenzuela streets, to cite a few examples), the initial extension of the city would occupy the current neighborhood of Magdalena and Tenerías to the east until the course of the Huerva river, and to the south a strip of land that would reach Cinco de Marzo and San Miguel streets, parallel to the Coso Alto. One of the arguments presented is that in the second half of the 2nd century, houses in this area were abandoned, suggesting the construction of the wall to the south and east at this time, which would cause the population to move from this area to the interior of the walls. A probable hypothesis is that the western and northern limits would have remained stable since the foundation of the city, even with a wall of opus caementicium that protected the most unprotected area, while in the east the wall was unnecessary in its early days thanks to the natural protection of the course of the Huerva, which would mark the eastern limit. In the 3rd century, in any case, the perimeter described above was definitively built or rebuilt with an ashlar wall, of which abundant remains are preserved.

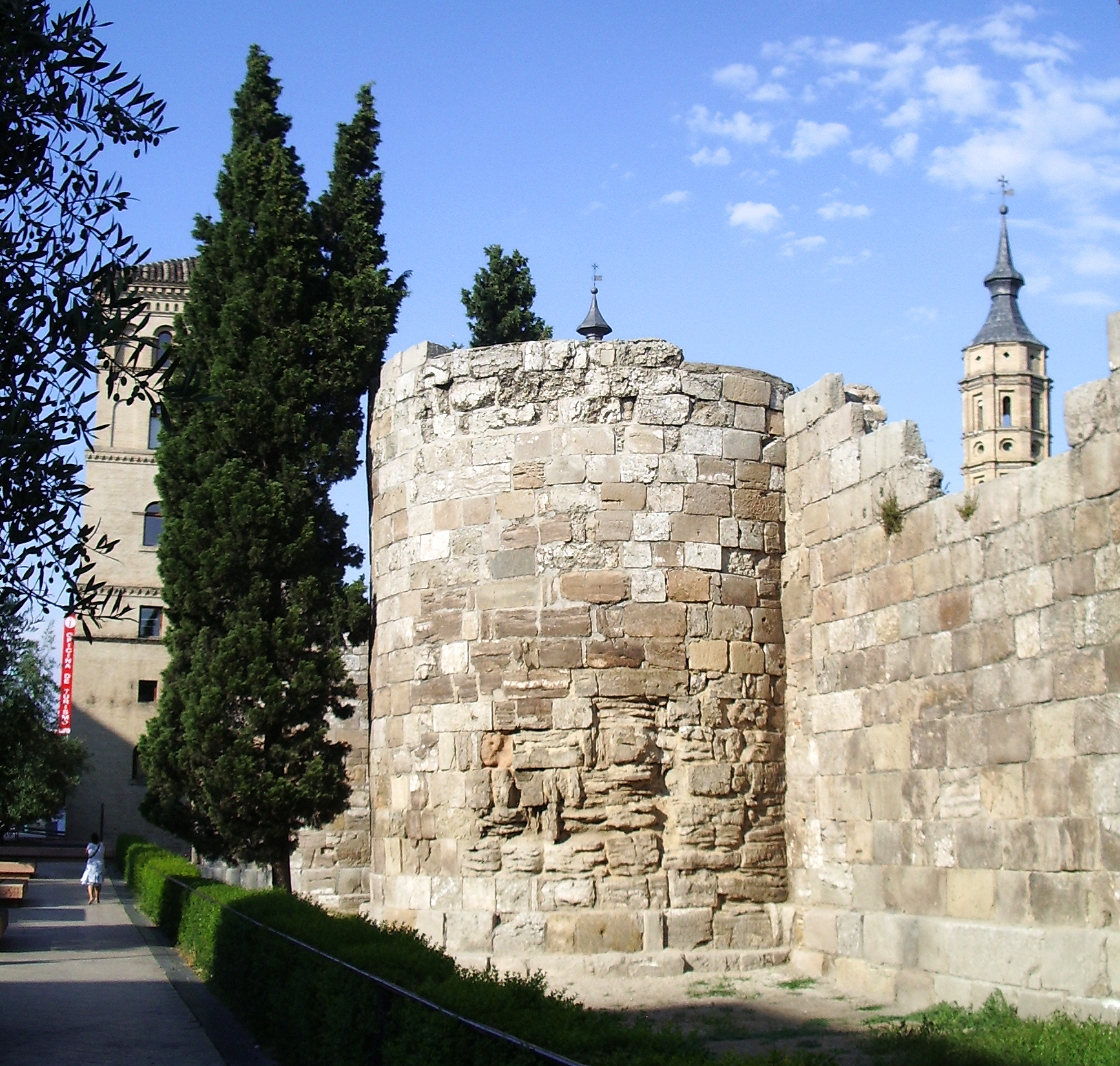
Northwest section of the Roman wall of Caesaraugusta (3rd century).

=== Wall ===
The ritual plowing of a sulcus primigenius—an act long shown on the reverses of the city's coinage—and erection of a city wall were general requisites of ancient Roman urban planning, particularly with regard to its formal colonies. Therefore, the existence of a wall at the founding of the colony and its subsequent rebuilding in the 3rd century were long taken for granted. However, abundant archaeological remains make it doubtful that Caesaraugusta had a wall that surrounded the entire perimeter of the city until the 3rd century, at least not in the appearance shown by the remains of canvases preserved today, especially on the eastern side, where the city was protected by the Huerva river.

The discovery in 2000 of the House of Añón Street and its location in the eastern part of the city, outside the walls of what was supposed to be the area included within the walls of Caesaraugusta, together with other archaeological remains found, have led to the assumption that the urbanized area extended in its beginnings beyond the walled Roman city of the 3rd century and it has even been postulated (according to research from 2003), that the Roman colony of Caesaraugusta may have initially lacked walls, particularly those located to the east.

=== Bridge ===
The existence of a bridge over the Ebro River at the location of the current Stone Bridge (probably already existing in Salduie's time) is documented from the discovery of lead pipes that supported the bridge and brought drinking water from the nearby Gallego River to the city. It is more difficult to elucidate whether the bridge was already built in ashlar stone in Roman times, although the prestige of the capital of the Caesaraugustan legal convent and the required solidity derived from its function as an aqueduct of heavy pipes leads us to think that it was a stone bridge.

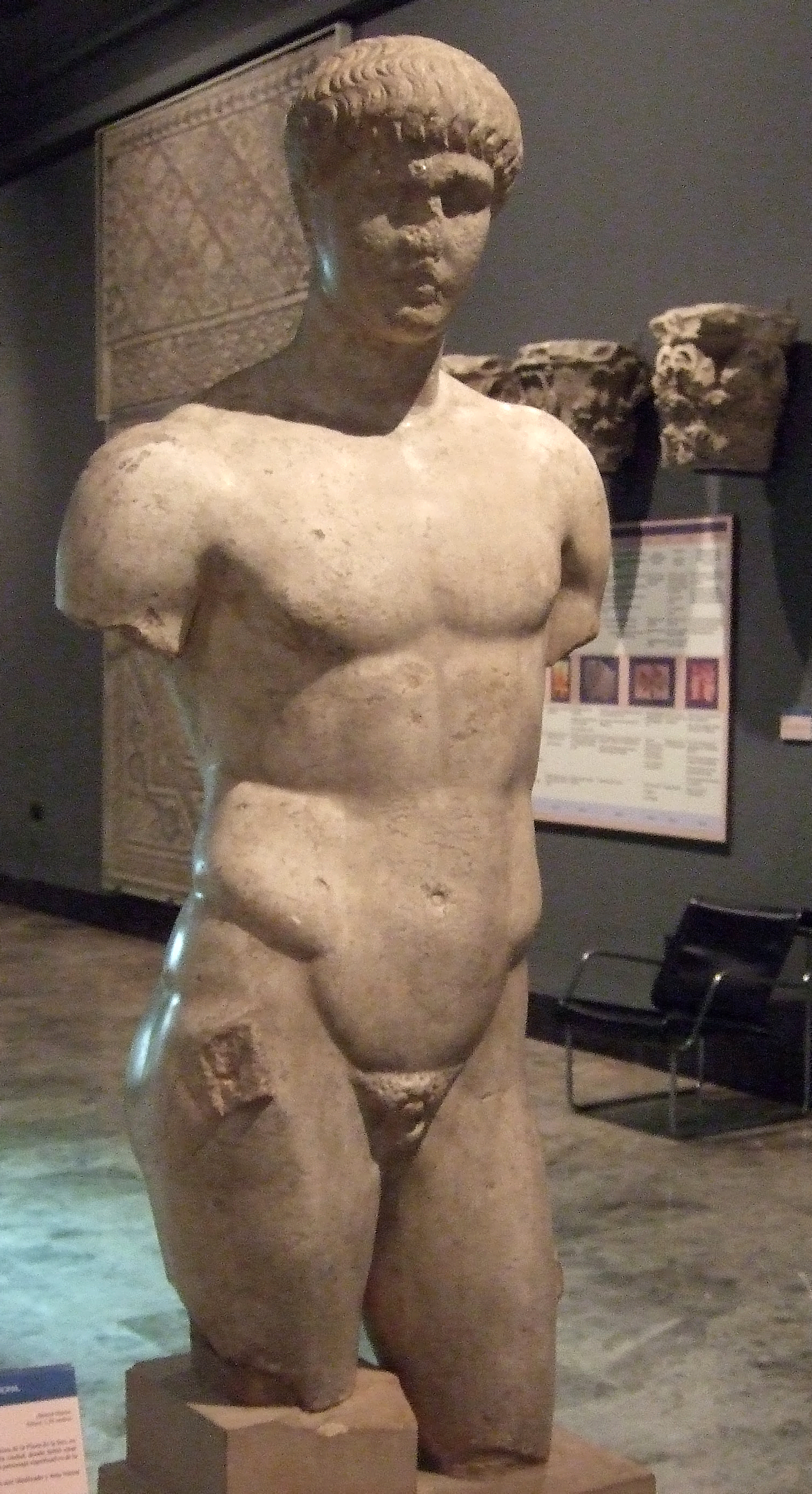
Statue of a male (second half of the first century A.D.) from the time of Nero or Domitian, whom it could represent as a young man, found in the Roman Forum of Caesaraugusta.

=== Augustan Forum ===
The forum of the Augustan or Saluitan period (located in the current Plaza de la Seo and the museum of the river port) had a mercantile character linked to the transport of goods to and from Tortosa across the Ebro, and was very possibly in operation before the Roman colonial foundation. Attached to the east of the cardo, it consisted of a quadrangular square open to the river, limited only on its long sides, which housed two bodies of commercial premises (seven tabernacles preserved on the east side), erected on plinths of opus vittatum and painting of the early style III. A simple covered portico closed the forum on the south side.

=== Hydraulic equipment ===
The Roman colony of Caesaragusta had a whole network of sewers, with drains and pipes and drinking water supply guaranteed through aqueducts that collected the water in large collecting cisterns, and whose archaeological remains have been excavated mainly since the last decade of the 20th century. In addition, in the district of the Tanneries, there was a drainage system for the periodic flooding of the Ebro, consisting of a field of amphorae grouped together and placed inverted.

Under the forum, and perpendicular to the Ebro, a large drainage sewer was designed: 2.82 m high and 2 m wide. It was built in opus caementicium with opus incertum lining. Other drainage systems in the city had notable dimensions, without reaching those of the main sewer. Thus, there is a section in Espoz y Mina Street made of opus vittatum 1.2 m high by 0.6 m wide. The proportions of the sewers of Caesaraugusta are similar to those of other large Roman cities, and comparable, for example, to those of Augusta Emerita.

=== High-Imperial Administration ===
From the time of the foundation of the city, Caesar Augusta was governed by two groups formed from the preeminent Roman citizens: the ordo decuriornum or curia (the local senate) and the ordo Caesaragustanum (a group of magistrates), which made up an ordo or order of citizens of the highest rank, initially drawn from among the officers and veterans of the legions and appointed by the commanders to establish the first curia.

At the head of the government of the city were two duumvirs, equivalent to the Roman consuls at the local level, whose name appeared on the coinage. Exceptionally, they could be substituted by a prefect with attributions directly emanating from Rome.

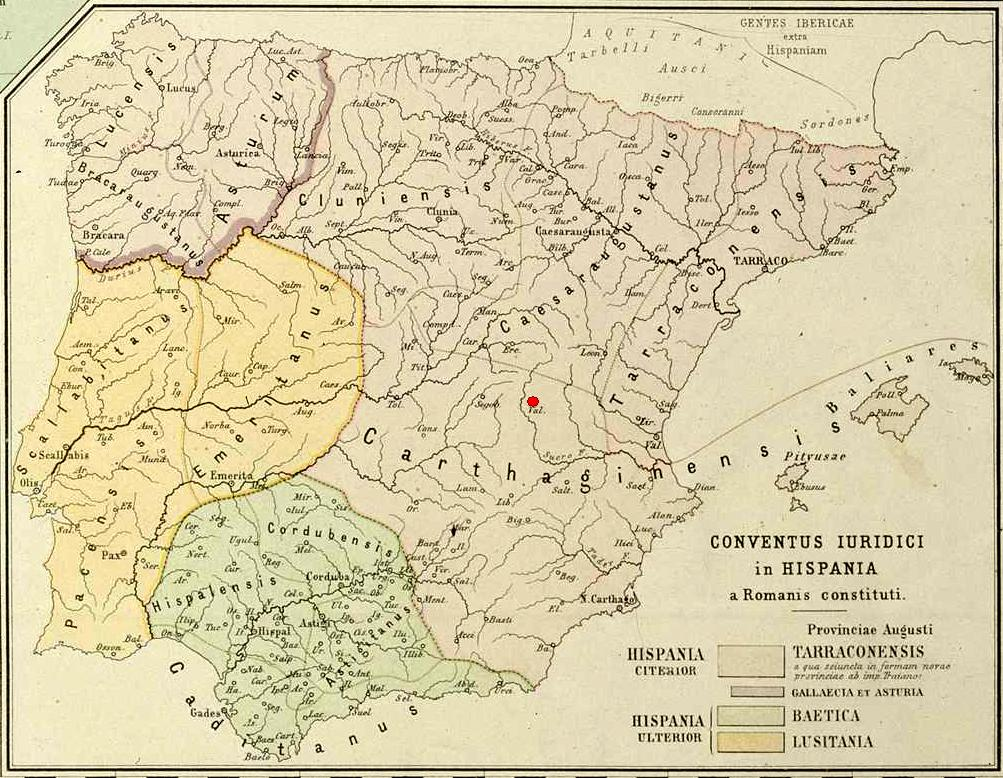
Juridical demarcations in Hispania.

The duumvirs were assisted by a couple of aediles, in charge of the good functioning of the industries, public works and grain supply silos (horrea), and a quaestor who was in charge of the administration.

The first duumvirs of Caesar Augusta were Quintus Lutatius, Marcus Fabius, Gaius Alsanus, Titus Cervius, Lucius Cassius and Gaius Valerius Fenestella, whose names refer to Italic families. Only the name of one aedile is known, Marcus Julius Antonianus, documented in the inscriptions on the lead pipes that, with aqueduct functions, were integrated into the bridge over the Ebro.

Caesaraugusta was the capital of one of the seven judicial districts (conventus iuridicus) of the province of Tarraco. The conventus Caesaraugustanus was one of the largest and included Pamplona and Irún to the north, Calahorra to the west, Alcalá de Henares to the south and Lérida to the east.

Thus, Caesaraugusta was a center where legal matters were to be resolved in the second instance, whenever they could not be solved in the municipal jurisdiction. In addition, it had a religious capital, with its own cult, since it had a Genius conventus caesaraugustani with its own priesthood and received tributes and sacred offerings from all the cities of the administrative demarcation. According to Fatás and Beltrán (1998), the remains of the Basilica found in the Palacio de los Pardo, at the confluence between the cardo and the decumanus, would constitute the solemn and religious forum; while the forum excavated under the plaza of La Seo would serve as the commercial and administrative forum of the city.

== 1st century A.D. ==
During this period, the new Colonia inmune experienced significant economic growth, judging by the volume of coinage minted and the scale of the public works carried out, which, at a good pace, ended up giving the Caesaraugustean city the physiognomy of a large city.

The entire bank of the Ebro was terraced at this time to prevent flooding up to a level equal to the current level of the Plaza del Pilar. The scope of these works solved for the future the risk of flooding of the Ebro, and Zaragoza benefited from it until today. The area around the city was also extensively cleared in order to develop agricultural land to supply the colony.

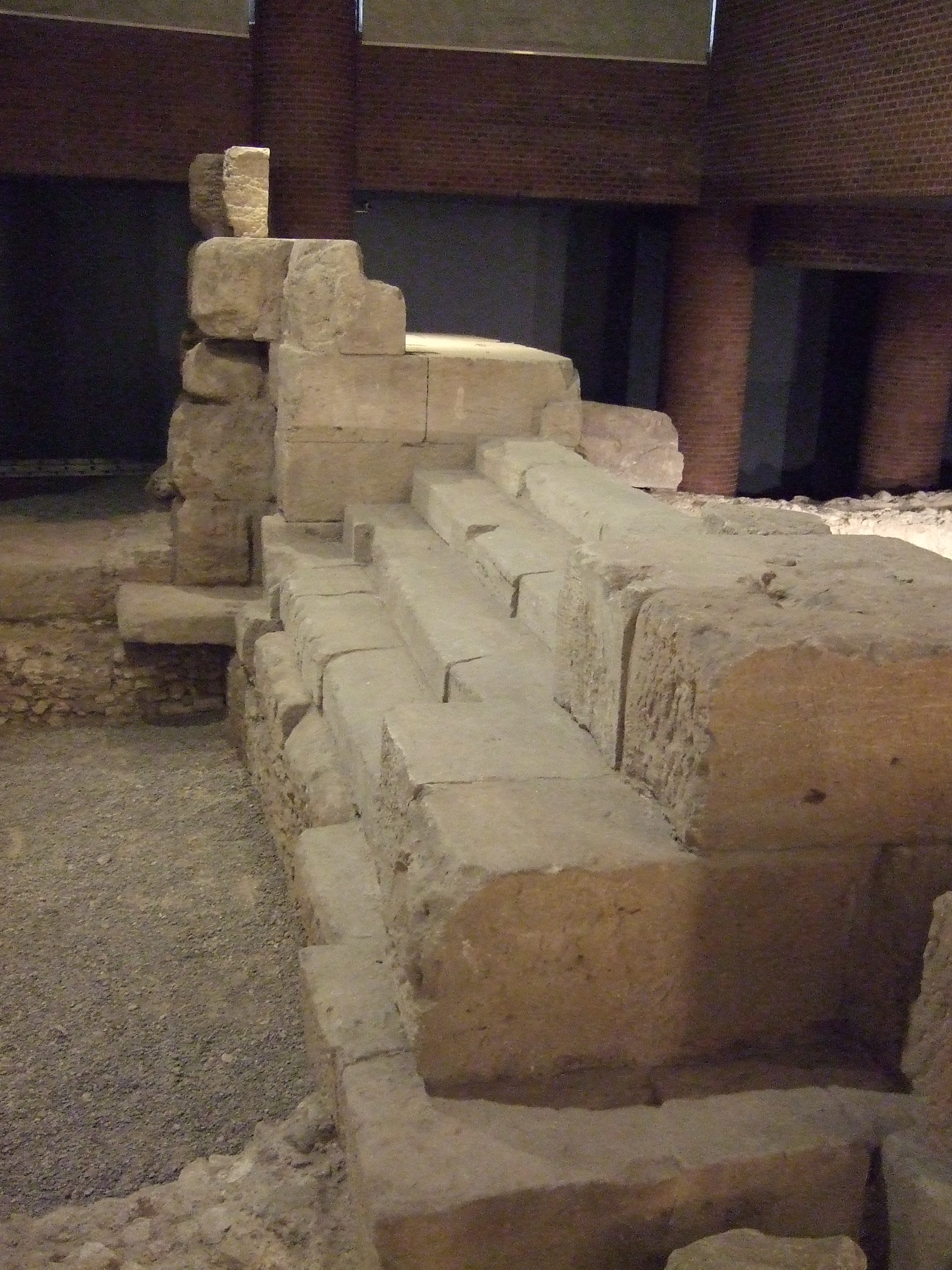
Remains of the access stairway from the river port to the commercial forum.

=== Forum of Tiberius ===
The most outstanding work in the time of Tiberius (14 A.D. - 37) was the remodeling of the forum, which was enlarged by designing a large rectangle of more than 50 meters on the western side, which housed tents built with ashlar masonry and provided with a basement. Its entire perimeter housed a double interior portico that may have been closed to the south with a large imperial temple with a double colonnade peristyle, although the configuration of the south side and presence of the temple is still conjectural. It was paved with limestone slabs and built with various techniques of rigging: opus vittatum, opus africanum and opus caementicium or Roman concrete.

The forum of Tiberius housed, in addition to the temple, other buildings and monuments of representative and institutional character. Traces of the curia building and pedestals supporting an iconographic sculptural program dedicated to Augustus, his family and his successors have been traced. Near the maximum sewer that runs under the forum was found a statue of a boy from the time of Nero or Domitian, whom it could represent.

On the other hand, there is a cereal storage area to the north of the forum, which was accessed from the river port by means of a monumental staircase with a triple-passage door. The remains of this stairway can be seen in the Caesaragusta River Port Museum.

Finally, in the excavations of the Palacio de los Pardo, current site of the Camón Aznar Museum, remains of a wall were found at the end of the 20th century that would have formed part of a temple or basilica and was perhaps the most relevant building of a forensic complex of a religious nature, and not commercial as would be that of the Plaza de las Catedrales. According to another theory of the location of the cardo, it could start from this forum and not need the setback that would lead to the door Cinegia from the street of Don Jaime I (also called San Gil), depending on the hypothesis and planimetry proposed by Maria Pilar Galve in 2004.

=== Theater ===
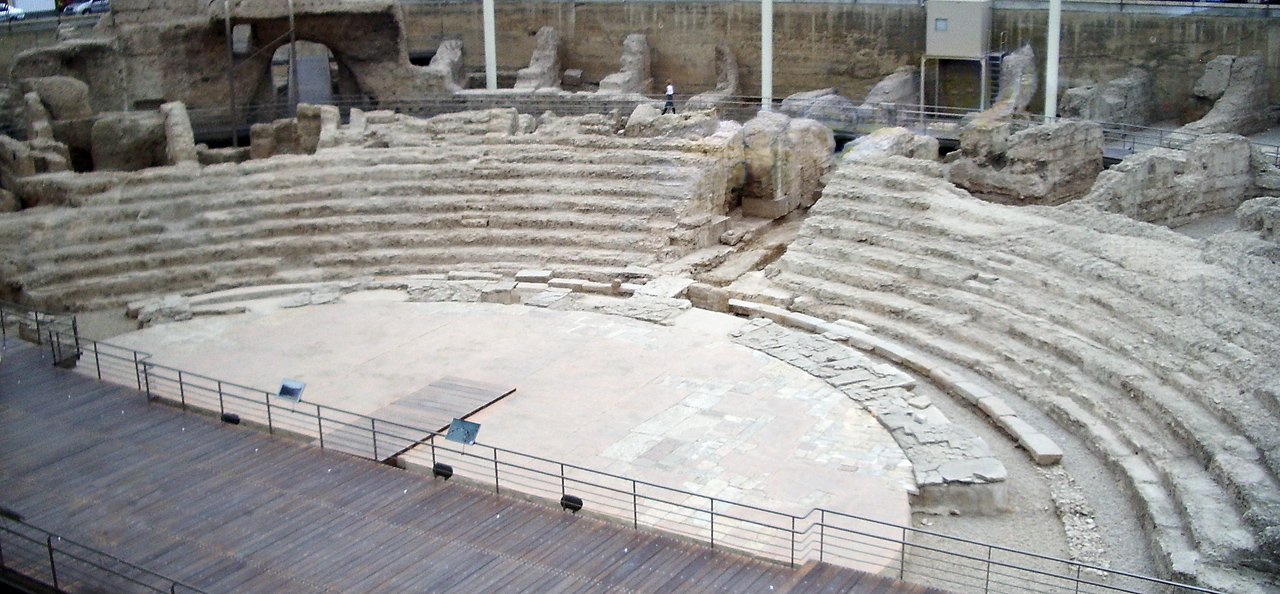
Theater of Caesaraugusta.

To this period also belongs the major work of the theater, whose construction began at the end of the government of Tiberius and was completed in the time of Claudius around 50 A.D. It occupied a site that had been destined for this theatrical infrastructure since the colonial planning of the period of Caesar Augustus.

It was inspired by the model of the Theatre of Marcellus of Rome. A concrete structure (opus caementicium) was used in its construction to raise the grandstand that, in its exterior façade of three floors and twenty-two meters high, was covered with marble slabs or opus quadratum ashlars offering a monumental decoration.

It had, however, a singular independent access from the central door of the façade to the orchestra of perpendicular layout to the tables or scena and that ran like an axis through the theater for the use of the authorities, who thus had direct access to the seats reserved for them in the orchestral semicircle. This exclusive access can also be seen in the theaters of Turin or Minturno —although it is unique among those of Roman Hispania— and may be due to the variety of shows, not only dramatic, but perhaps also gladiatorial, which would be held there.

It is one of the largest theaters in Hispania, with a surface area of 7,000 square meters (106 m in diameter) and a capacity for approximately 6,000 spectators.

=== Other public works: temples and baths ===
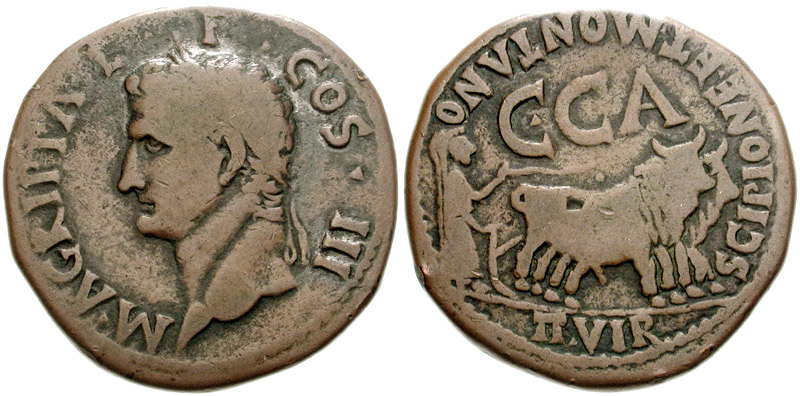
Coin minted in Caesaraugusta under the rule of Emperor Caligula. The obverse shows a commemorative portrait of General Agrippa; the reverse represents the founding ritual of the colony. The inscription C-CA alludes to the mint of Caesaraugusta, and the legend SCIPIONE-ET-MONTANO (Scipio and Montano) gives an account of the two duumvirs who ruled as local consuls A.D. 38/39.

At the end of the 1980s, in the course of the remodeling works of the Plaza del Pilar, the foundations and part of the podium of a Capitoline temple appeared, located where today is the subway parking lot of the square, quite far from the only known forum, together with the fact that it has an E-W axis orientation (entrance from the east), suggesting the existence of two connected forums.

Apart from this finding, the appearance of the temples can be documented through the coins issued in Zaragoza. In a dupondius of the year 28 is represented a temple of hexastyle type that was accessed through three steps, with columns of attic type and a simple pediment decorated geometrically with inscribed triangles that was dedicated to the pietas augusti. Later, in an as of the year 33 appears another tetrastyle temple of Corinthian columns with fluting.

In the final Julio-Claudian stage, which includes the governments of Caligula, Claudius and Nero, numerous public works were also carried out, which ended up giving the city its definitive appearance in its ancient classical stage. Basically, empty plots of land were filled in, and landscaped spaces and other important infrastructures were built, such as the public baths that appeared on San Juan and San Pedro Street, which have now been converted into a museum space.

Of these public baths, a swimming pool or natatio is preserved in good condition, surrounded by columns following examples of Roman representation. It would be a bathing facility arranged in consecutive axis, following the sequence natatio, frigidaria, tepidaria and caldaria. The interior was decorated with marble slabs on the floors and walls, with the addition of floral ornamentation in the Julio-Claudian tradition. There were more public baths, and numerous private baths in private homes. Among the first are those found in the square of the cathedrals, from the time of Nero or Vespasian.

=== Ceramics ===
In terms of material culture, in the second half of the first century A.D. there was a greater presence of Hispanic ceramics, found in the various dwellings excavated in Saragossa. Likewise, the appearance of ceramics from North Africa is documented and, in glazed ceramics, the colony continues to be nourished by production centers in the north of the Italic peninsula.

The presence for the first time of pottery for everyday use from pottery workshops in Zaragoza, located in Calle Predicadores, from the middle of the first century AD, is very significant.

Ceramics in the Museum

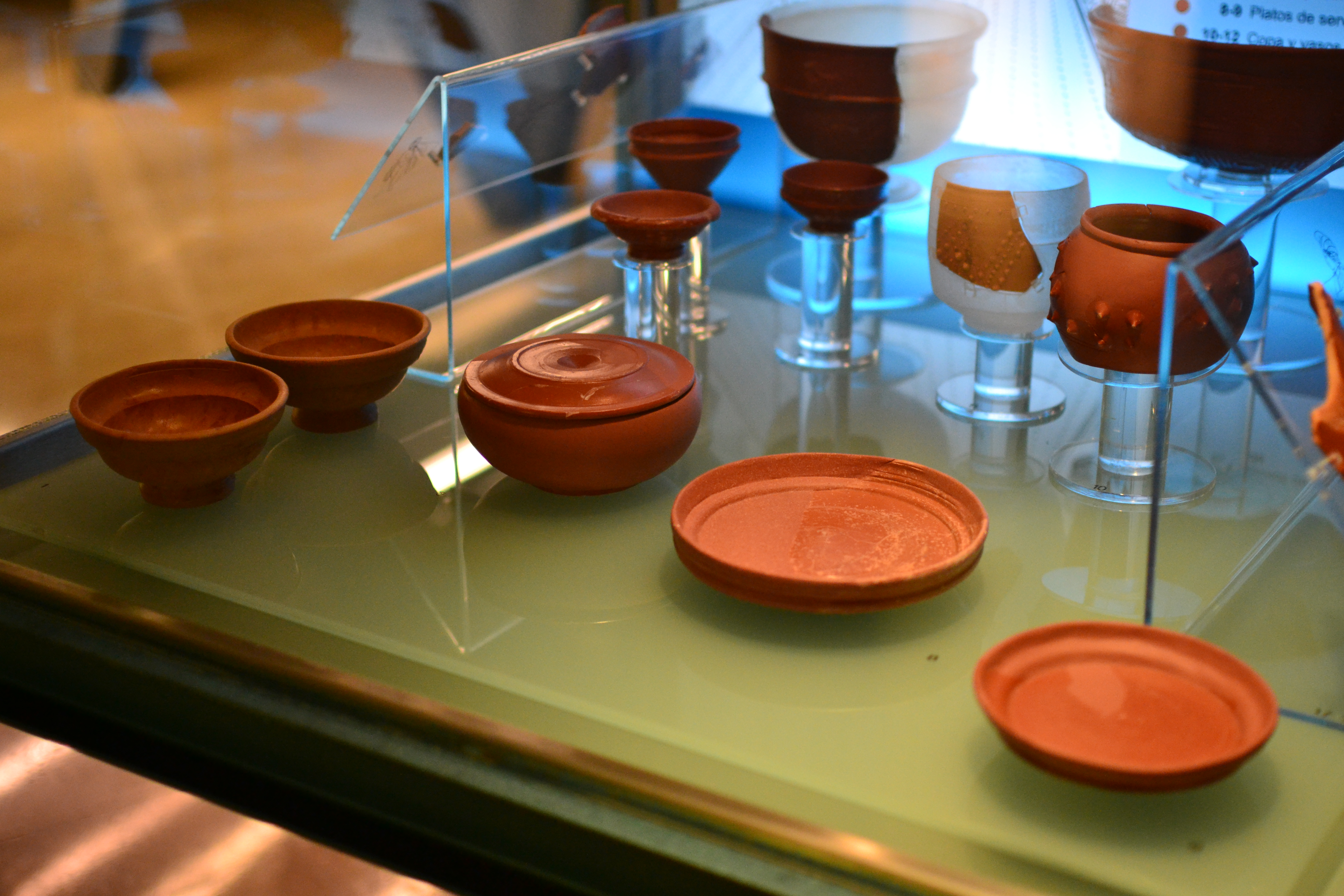
Remains of Roman pottery

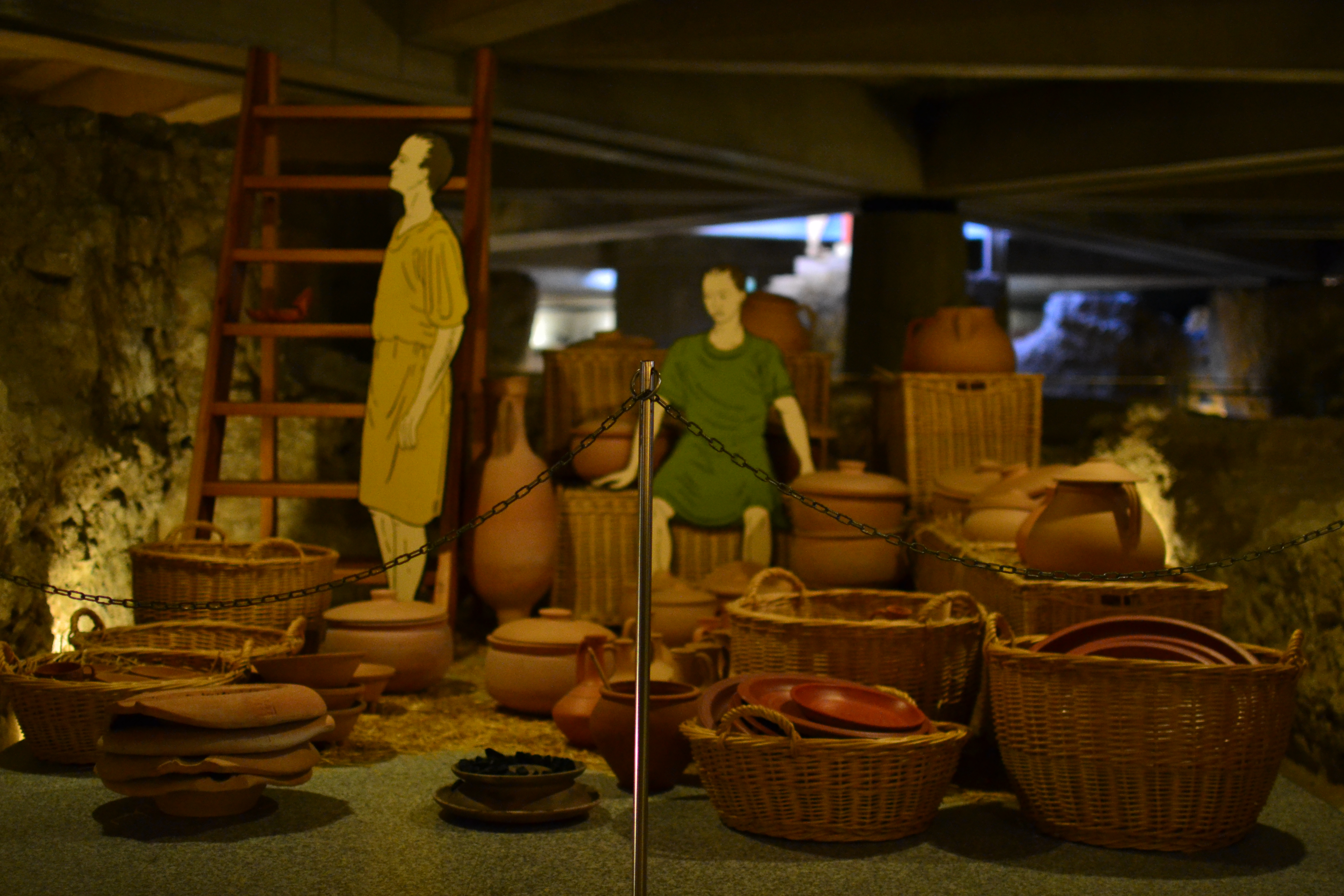
Set of different Roman ceramics

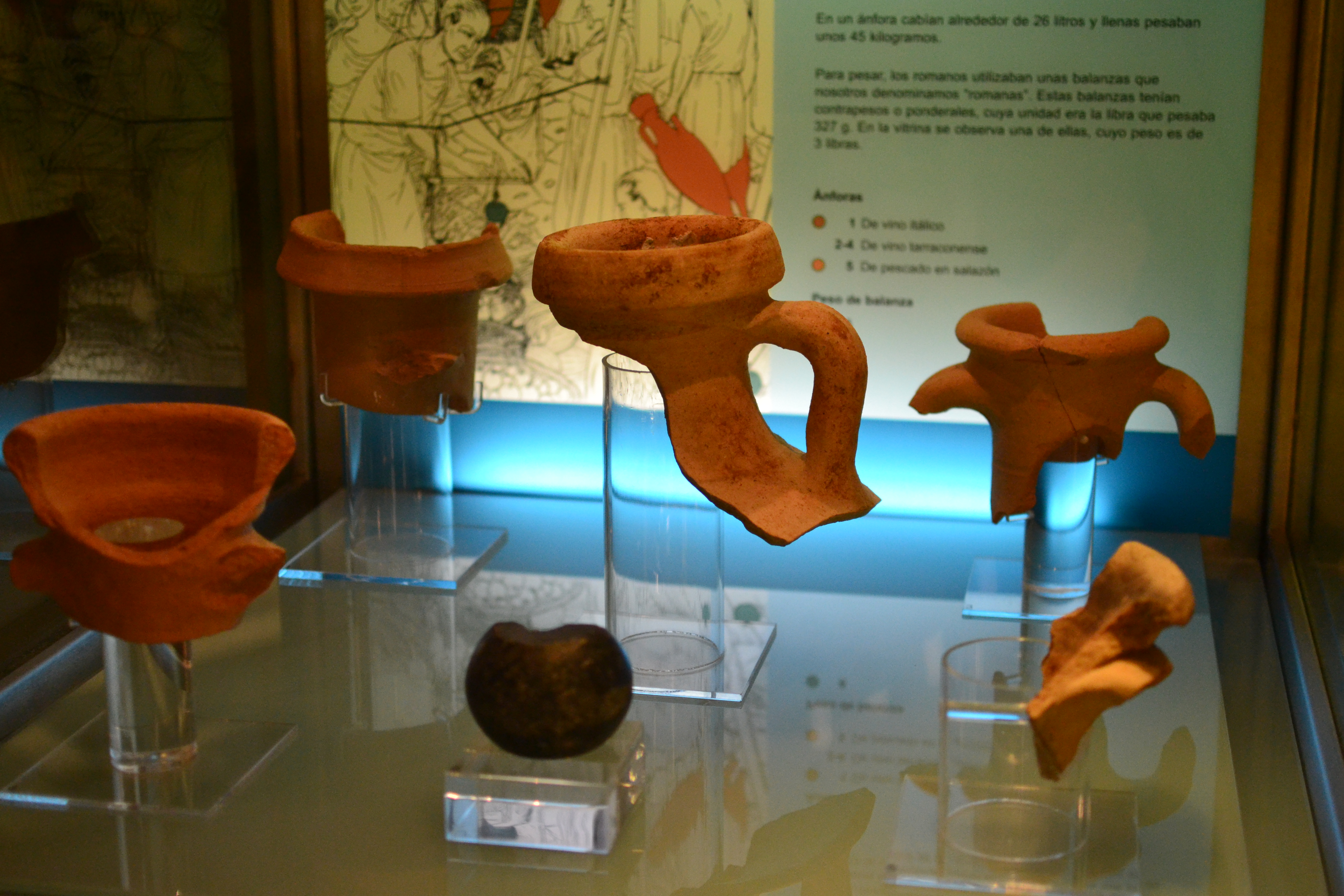
Remains of Roman pottery

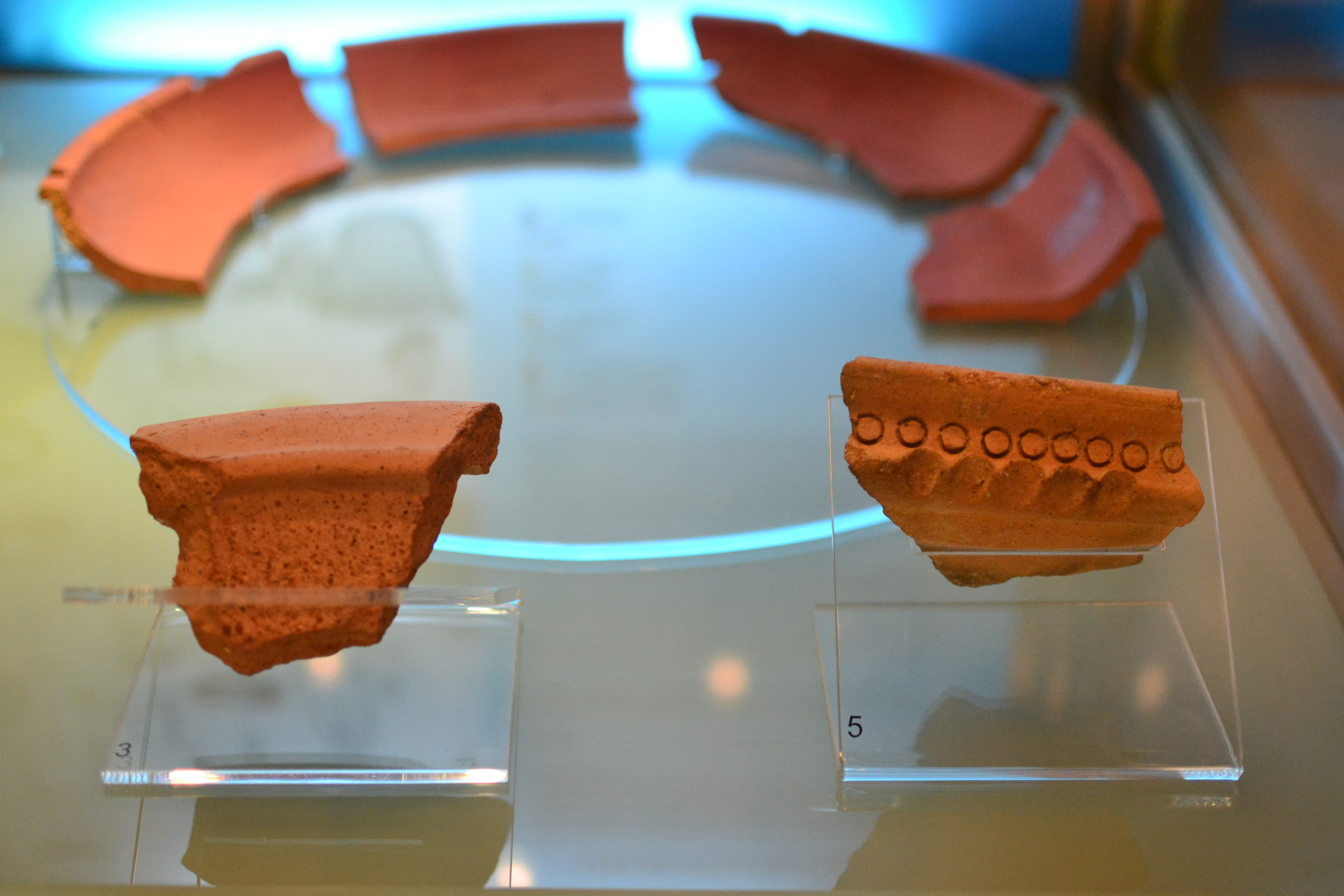
Remains of Roman pottery

=== Late 1st century A.D. ===
With the Flavian dynasty, the communication routes with the surroundings of Caesaraugusta were strengthened, as evidenced by a milestone located on the road to Bílbilis. New plots of land were inhabited in the city, such as the one at 6 Torrenueva Street. In addition, remains of boulder walls have been found outside the perimeter traditionally considered urbanized in 6 Palomeque Street, of a house in Heroísmo Street, next to the remains of an urban road, and of a nymphaeum in 4 Doctor Palomar Street with a pond, a fountain and mural paintings. Major renovations were also undertaken in the theater.

== 2nd century A.D. ==
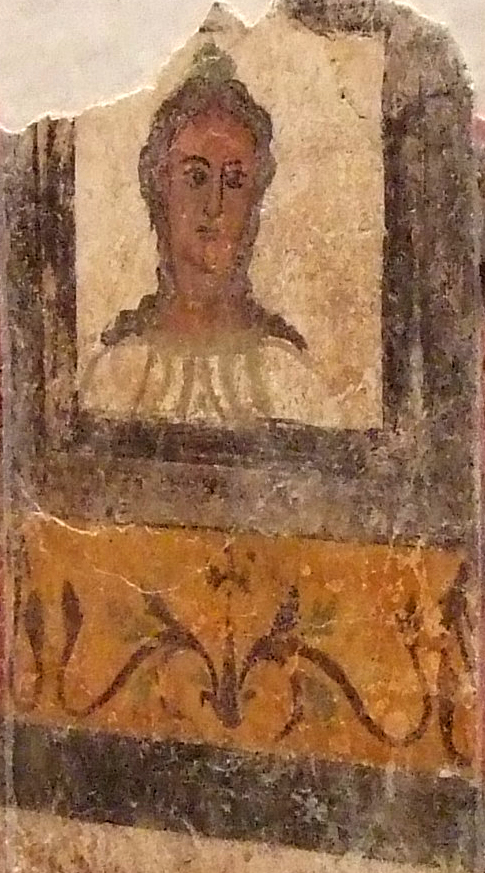
Mural painting representing a muse from the time of Hadrian (117-138), found at 5-7 San Agustin Street.

It is still a period of emerging economy, as can be attested by the completion of the road leading to the capital of Lusitania, Augusta Emerita.

The Antonine period is characterized by the expansion of the city's economic activities into rural areas, causing a significant growth of agricultural villas. An example of this is the one found between Alfonso V and Rebolería streets. It was centralized around a porticoed impluvium endowed with a central statue of a drunken Faun lying on a wineskin from which liquid flows, and has a parallel in the statues of recumbent nymphs of the villa of Virunum. The site was built from the 1st century, which gives another proof that the city, before the 3rd century, extended to the banks of the Huerva.

Numerous examples of domus (or single-family houses) of wealthy citizens of the city had private baths, although other public thermal establishments have also appeared, such as those in the Plaza de Santa Marta, which preserved the remains of paintings of garlands and flowers. However, archaeological prospections have so far not documented the presence of insulae, or blocks of apartments.

Caesaraugusta is already a city with an agricultural perimeter of great importance, irrigated by the four rivers that converge in its vicinity (Jalón, Huerva, Gállego and Ebro); necropolis located on the margins of the access roads to the city and a set of industrial workshops among which the potteries stand out.

Towards the end of the 2nd century, polychrome and decorative mosaics appear, such as the one in the great domus of San Juan de los Panetes dedicated to Orpheus (perhaps from the 3rd century). Other mosaics of great beauty are those of Eros and Pan, Eros and Psyche and the Triumph of Bacchus (also dated at the beginning of the 21st century in the 3rd century), found between Coso Alto and Alfonso I streets.

The remains of a domus with polychrome mural paintings, including representations of the muses, were also found at the end of the 20th century in Calle San Agustín 5-7. It is a style dated to the time of Hadrian (117-138), new in Caesaraugusta and characterized by a range of warm tones and figurative representation. It increases the size of the pictorial ornamentation of the walls of the houses. Alongside these complex decorations, simpler models continue to appear, decorating the walls with marble imitations, which will last until the 4th century.

== 3rd century A.D. ==
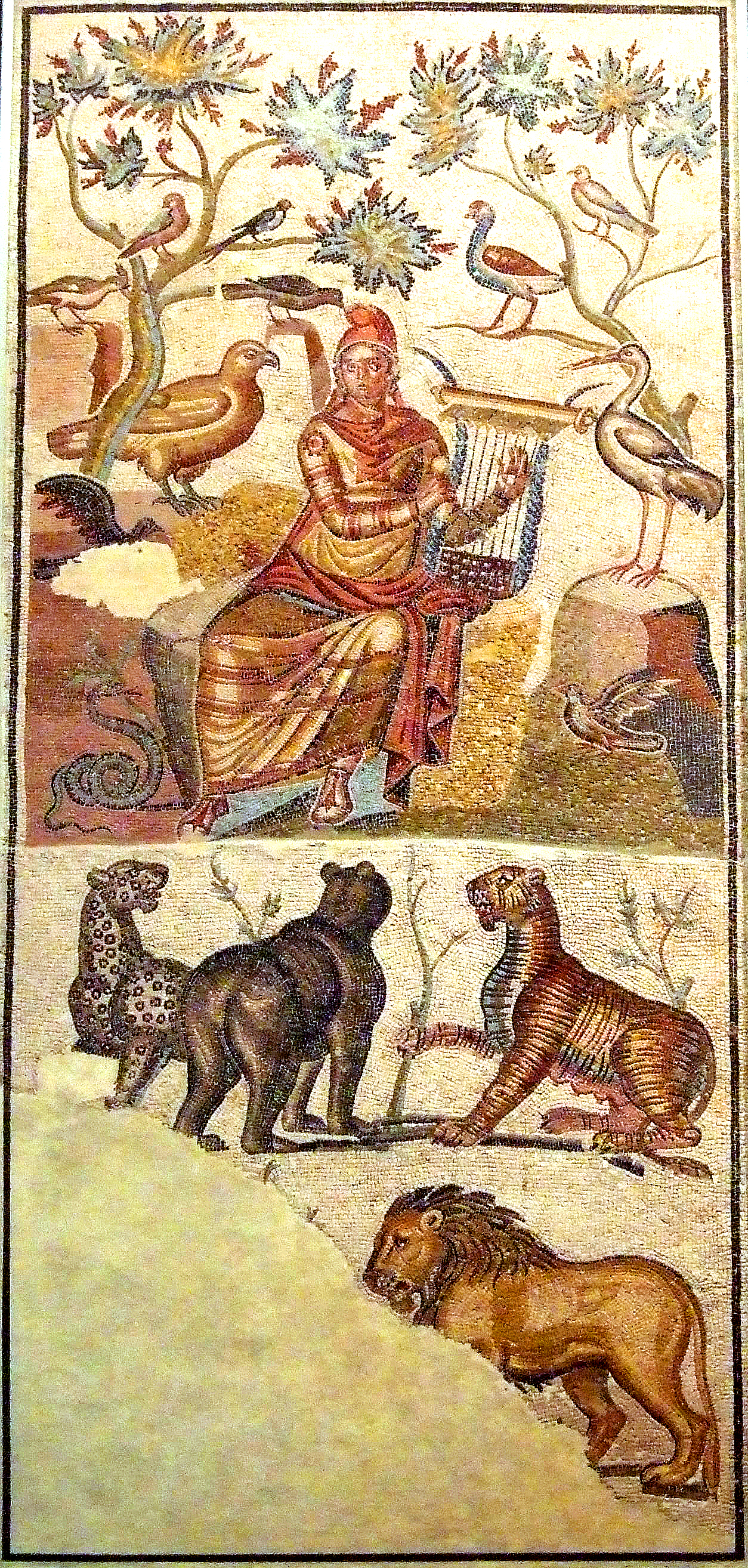
Mosaic of Orpheus. 2nd-3rd century A.D.

Although the first half of the 3rd century AD is quite unknown as far as Caesaraugusta is concerned, this is a period of significant changes in the city. The surviving walls were rebuilt or constructed in this century, since it was an unstable period, corroborating the fact that the city of Rome itself had to be walled in this century when it felt threatened. The remains of the wall that can be seen today are a stretch of about eighty meters between the Central Market and the church of San Juan de los Panetes and the lower part of another stretch of two cubes in the northeast corner (Paseo de Echegaray y Caballero).

In the 3rd century the theater of Caesaraugusta is modified again, which may indicate a new function for the space of this building, where perhaps the theatrical spectacle itself is no longer preeminent, in favor of the celebration of other types of entertainment.

On the other hand, the 3rd century saw a proliferation of large houses representing the most prestigious citizens of the city. In them, polychrome mosaic pavements of great proportions can be found, such as that of the House of Orpheus, a domus of big proportions whose hall had a surface area of 47 m^{2}; or that of the Triumph of Bacchus that appeared next to an important sculptural group: the Ena Group (two nymphs performing music, reflecting exquisite taste, delicate chiseling and a philhellenistic taste introduced in the Empire under the Antonines), preserved in the Marés museum in Barcelona; previous dating, however, it was attributed these mosaics and sculptures to the 2nd century.

There is also a proliferation of agrarian villas in the process of ruralization experienced by Roman culture in its final period, and the great differences that begin to appear between honestiores (or wealthy) and humiliores (of humble social status) citizens.

The western road or the Toledo gate, had been generating in its margins a neighborhood of pottery workshops, since the industries of the city had to settle outside the urban area to be generators of pollution and waste.

The necropolis of the city had been located outside the city walls, on the sides of the great access and exit roads of the city. In the 3rd century, at least three important necropolises are documented, one on each of the roads corresponding to the east or Toledo exits (San Pablo neighborhood, San Blas and Dosset streets), west (Las Fuentes necropolis, Nuestra Señora del Pueyo street) and north (next to the Ebro, Paseo de Echegaray y Caballero).

In the middle of the 4th century, a Christian cemetery was built around a place of worship in the chapel of Las Santas Masas, a religion whose presence in Zaragoza dates back to the middle of the 3rd century, as attested by a letter from Bishop Cyprian, head of the Christian Church in Carthage.

== Late Antiquity (284-408 A.D.) ==
After reaching power, Diocletian (284-305) reformed the State and the Roman political system, which had suffered a prolonged crisis that threatened the unity of the Empire since the time of Marcus Aurelius (161-180), facilitating the barbarian incursions. Diocletian distributed the responsibilities of government among the tetrarchs, of which Maximian and Constantius corresponded to the West, leaving Hispania, Africa and Italy, and thus Caesaraugusta, in the hands of Maximian. The city remained from that moment to the margin of the maneuvers of Diocletian to recover the power and, to its death, the government of Hispania passed to the following emperors. In the absence of direct information, it is to suppose that the city continued being demilitarized, falling the defense of the walls in case of attack on the local militia and especially on the collegia iuvenum, a body formed by the sons of the upper classes. The peasants close to the city took refuge inside the walls; those farther away had to rely on small troops stationed in watchtowers regularly distributed along the roads for their defense. Large landowners could have their own private army, made up of slaves and serfs.

Hispania after the administrative reforms of Diocletian.

Within the administrative reforms initiated by Diocletian, the Hispania Citerior was divided in three: Gallaecia, Tarraconensis and Carthaginensis, with praeses perfectissimus, all part of the Diocesis Hispaniarum, with capital in Merida. Caesaraugusta continued to belong to the province of Tarraconensis, governed by a praeses with headquarters in Tarragona, with the disappearance of the old Caesaraugustan convent.

Usually, the 4th century is analyzed from the point of view of the decline of the Empire: the fiscal pressure on the curiales, the fleeing of the founding aristocracy to their rural estates and the economic crisis would have caused the decline or ruin of the late Roman cities. In the case of Caesaraugusta, archaeology has revealed the decadence of the thermal complex of San Juan and San Pedro in the mid-4th century. The baths suffered a spoliation of noble materials and such a radical abandonment that the remains of an adolescent were found on the floor of the frigidarium. Other signs of the difficulties of the mid-4th century are the abandonment of a domus at 6 Torrenueva Street, showing traces of fire in the mosaic, indicating a bad use of the dwelling, the destruction of the domestic baths at Ossaú Street and the definitive abandonment of the theater, which must not have been unaffected by the spread of Christianity, since it did not look favorably on this pagan spectacle.

However, the decadence does not seem to have been important in the case of Zaragoza. Archaeology shows the existence of large luxurious houses, an import of exclusive products from Rome and the south of France and an active trade with North Africa. The main source of the 4th century, Paulinus of Nola, whose wife Therasia had possessions in Zaragoza, Tarragona and Barcelona, recounts that he himself dwells in Caesaraugusta, among other localities, and praises its extensive territory and its walls. In 379 a synod was held in the city, an indication that it had the capacity to receive bishops and their entourages. In fact, towards the end of the 4th century, Zaragoza and Barcelona began to increase their importance compared to Tarragona. There are reports of circus games in Caesaraugusta in the year 504, a sign that the curiales were still fulfilling their functions at that late date.

=== Low-Imperial Administration ===
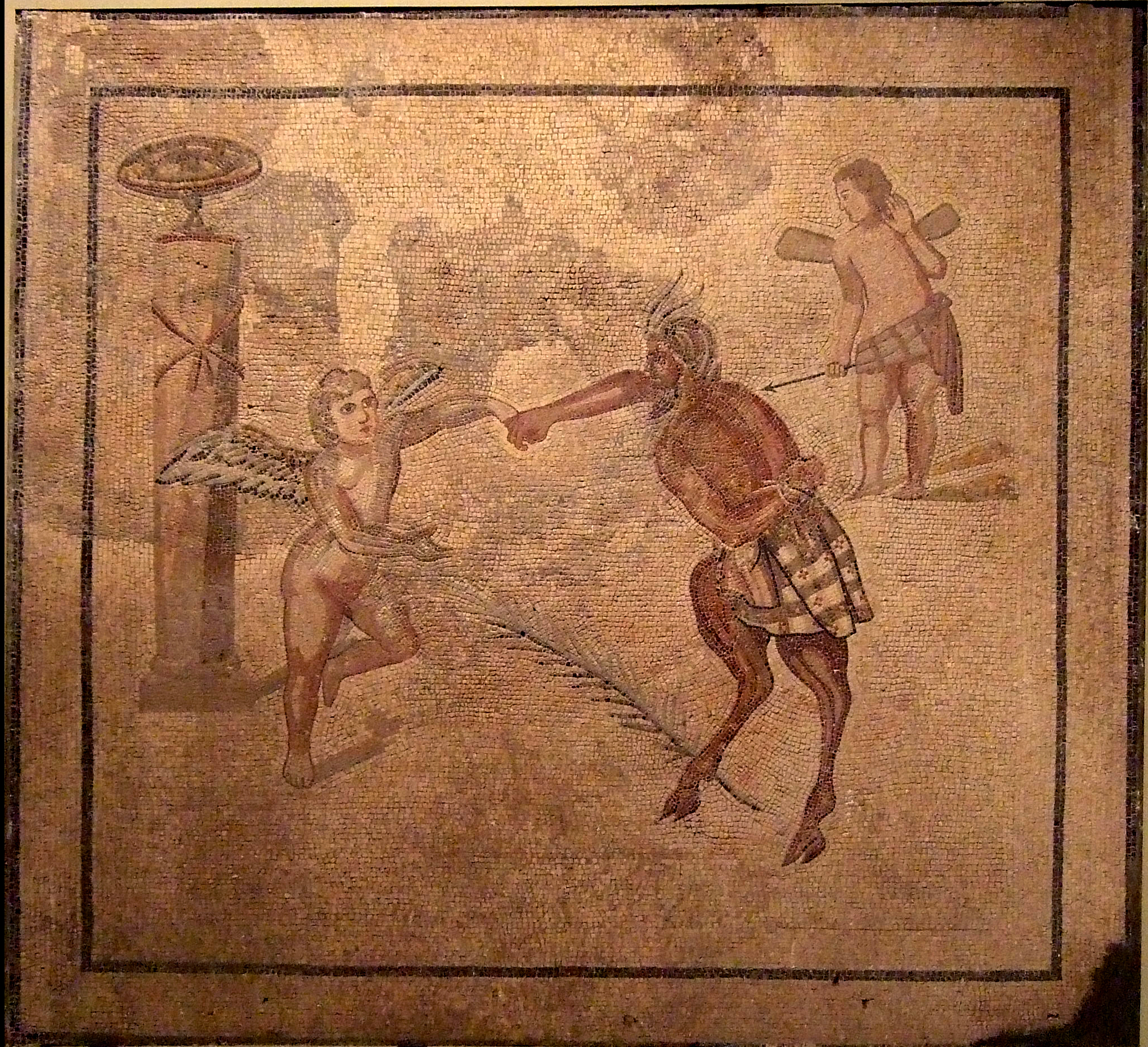
Mosaic of Eros and Pan, Caesaraugusta, 2nd-8th centuries A.D.

Taking the North African city of Timgad as a model, it is possible to reconstruct approximately the local government: curia or senate, magistrates and populus. There were approximately one hundred curiales, of whom a minority were honorati exempt from munera, tax burdens, classified in descending order into clarissimi, of senatorial rank, the perfectissimi, from 326 different from the equites, and the sacerdotales, former priests. Below them were the decuriones, also belonging to the curia, local hereditary aristocrats from the 3rd century; the sons of a decurion acceded to the ordo upon emancipation at the age of 25, but were required to take a foundation census to guarantee the fulfillment of the financial burdens. The magistrates and decurions initially performed their services to the city on a voluntary basis, in return for the power and prestige of the office; but from Severan times this voluntary exercise was codified in the form of obligatory munera. Among the services rendered to the city, apart from the payment of the summa honoraria upon taking office, the officials had to organize games, maintain the public baths, supervise the bringing and evacuation of water, officially represent the city, control and supervise the conservation and construction of roads, bridges, aqueducts, public buildings and walls, and oversee the prices of the market, among other activities.

The head of the magistrates was the curator ciuitatis who was elected for one year among the curiales or from 363 by the citizen council with the other magistrates. The functions of the curator were to oversee the financial management, the registration of the acta, the execution of public works, the provisioning, the control of prices, in charge of the police and the instruction of some minor matters; the duouiri, the other magistrates, aediles and quaestors, were subordinate to them.

The territorium or rural territory that depended administratively on Caesaraugusta is unknown. It included the lands of the curiales, the rustic villas, the vici or dependent villages, the pagi or minor places and the communal lands. The leasing and exploitation of the latter went to the municipal treasury until the change of legislation, which transferred two thirds of the property to the imperial treasury. The extension can be assumed to be considerable, if one considers that there are no nearby cities of importance and the agglomeration of rustic villas in the surroundings of the city.

=== The arrival of Christianity ===
Eighteen martyrs are kept by our people in a single tomb; we call Zaragoza the city that has been able to hold such glory.

Prudentius, Peristephanon, translation by J. Guillén

The first news of Christianity in Caesaraugusta appears in a letter of Cyprian, bishop of Carthage, dated 254, in which he mentions Felix of Caesaraugusta, fidei cultor ac defensor veritatis.

But it was Prudentius who left the most extensive testimony in his carmen Peristephanon of the beginning of the 5th century. In it he speaks of the Innumerable Martyrs, in reality 18 —Optatus, Lupercus, Suceso, Martial, Urbanus, Quintilianus, Julia, Publius, Fronton, Felix, Caecilian, Eventius, Primitivus, Apodemus and four Saturnines—, besides Engratia, Valerius and Vincent and Gaius and Clement, the latter confessors who were not killed. The first, the martyrs of Saragossa, and Engracia seem to have died in the persecution of Valerian (200-260) in 257 and 258, although the data is not certain. Valerius, bishop of Saragossa, and Vincent, his deacon, were deported around 303-305 to Valencia by Maximian (250-310), where they were tortured, Vincent dying. Valerius, who still attended the council of Iliberis around 306, belonged to the domus infulata of the Valerians, a dynasty of Caesaraugustan bishops named Valero/Valerius, which shows that Saragossa was already an episcopal see from the middle of the 3rd century. There are indications that Saint Engracia and the martyrs would have been buried in a small building dedicated to their cult, a Martyrium, to which a mosaic of the 4th century with Christian symbolism preserved in the Museum of Saragossa could belong.

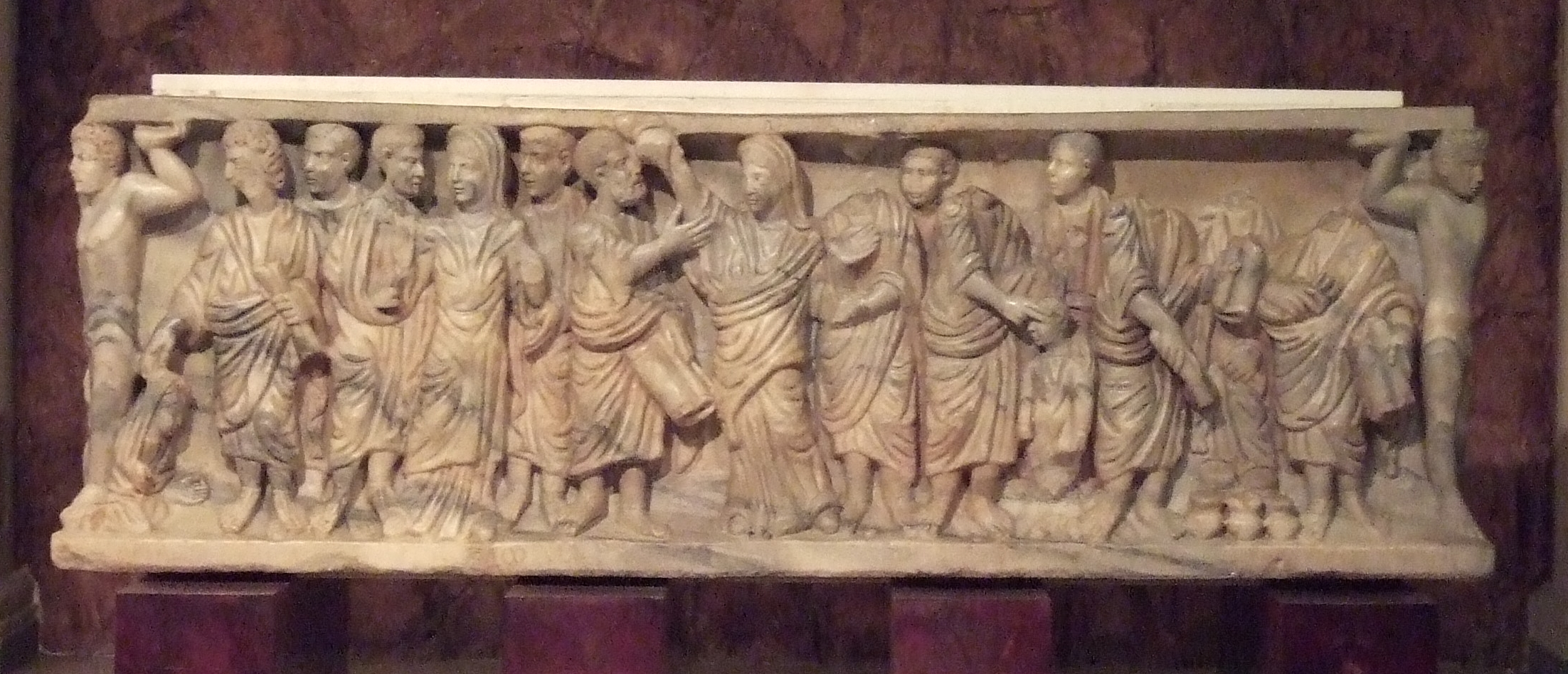
Sarcophagus called of the receptio animae or of the Assumption (ca. 330-350 A.D.), from a Christian necropolis near the basilica church of Santa Engracia, where they are found today. The iconography shows various scenes, among which we can highlight the healing of the hemorrhoea and Christ, the receptio animae, the healing of the blind man, the wedding at Cana.

In 311 Galerius (260-311) published the edict that officially legalized the Christian church and from 313, Christianity obtained a privileged position in front of the traditional religion. This allowed the realization of a series of councils, like the already mentioned of Iliberis, in which the church purified and eliminated a series of heresies. Rufinus and Clementius were sent to the Council of Arles in 314. In 343, Casto, bishop of Saragossa, was summoned to Serdica (present-day Sofia, Bulgaria) to combat Arianism. Councils were also held in Saragossa, the first in 380 dedicated to the fight against Priscillianism.

From between 330 and 350 A.D. two early Christian sarcophagi have been preserved, which are kept in the basilica church of Santa Engracia. They possibly come from a necropolis that was located in the area of Santa Engracia and the Plaza de los Sitios related to the Martyrium mentioned above. Both are of marble sculpted in Rome and brought by ship, indicating the existence of Christians with sufficient resources. The first, named the Assumption or the receptio animae, shows various biblical scenes, such as the creation of Adam and Eve, the healing of the hemorrhoid, the prayer between two apostles, the receptio animae, the healing of the blind man, the wedding at Cana and the Original Sin. The second sarcophagus, usually called the Petrine trilogy, shows the miracle of the fountain, the arrest of Peter, the scene of the rooster, the healing of the blind man, the conversion of water into wine, the multiplication of the loaves and fishes and the resurrection of Lazarus.

In addition to the aforementioned basilica-church of Santa Engracia, which was located in the same place as the present building, it is possible that there were two other basilicas-churches in the city. The first, that of Santa María, on the site where the Basílica del Pilar is now located; the second, that of San Millán, on the grounds of the old Roman theater. There has also been speculation about the existence of a third basilica-church in the western necropolis, identifying it as that of San Felix. The remains of the temple of the forum have been found under the cathedral of La Seo, which indicates a continuity of worship from Roman times, passing through the major mosque of Saraqusta and the modern Christian cathedral, although no archaeological evidence has been found of the existence of a Roman or Visigothic Christian temple on the site.

In 380 Theodosius (346-395), with the edict of Thessalonica, named Christianity the official and only religion of the Empire.

== The fall of the Empire (408-472 A.D.) ==
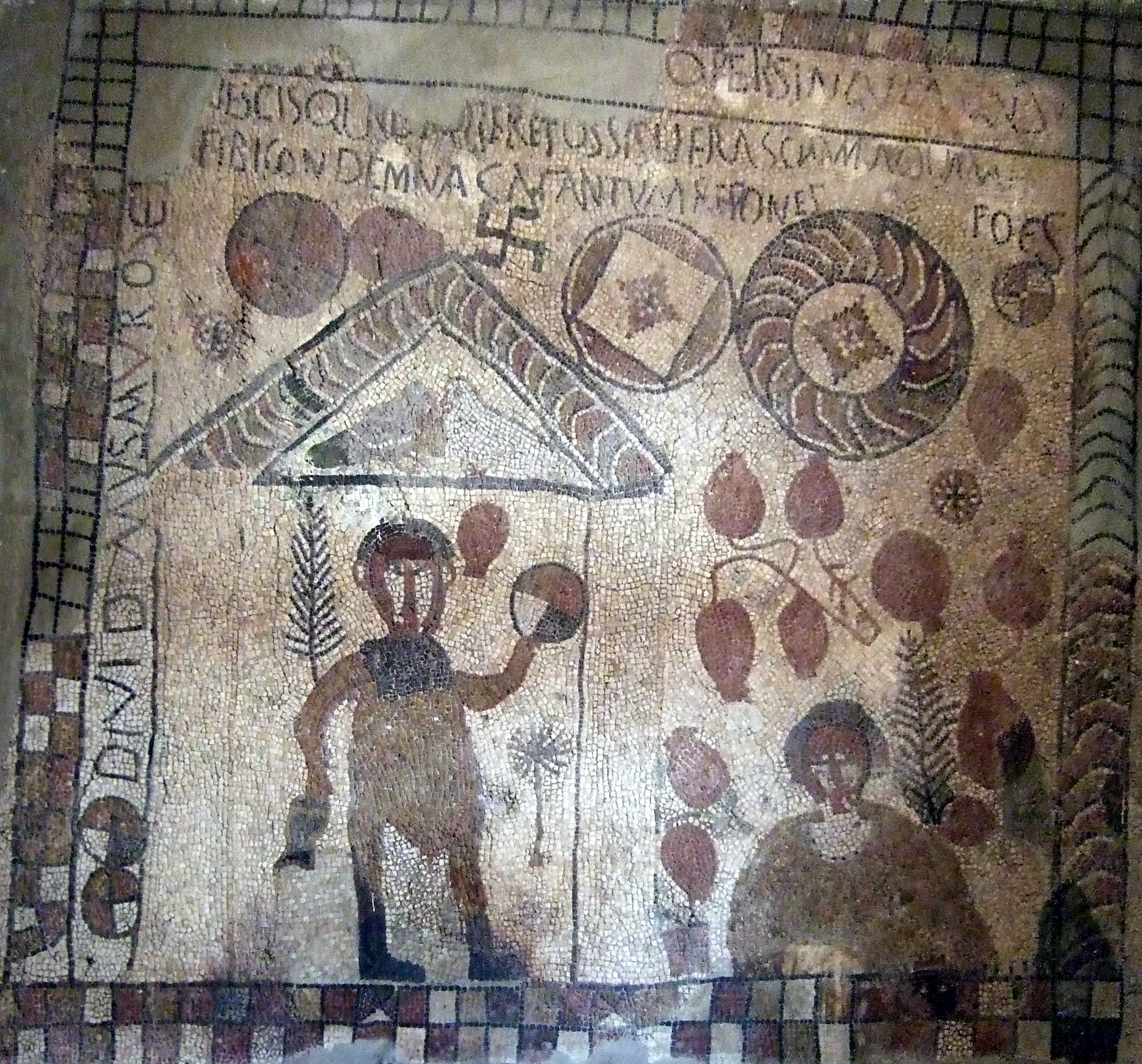
Mosaic of the rustic villa of Estada (5th century A.D.).

The internal crisis of the Empire was compounded by the fact that in the winter of 405-406 the Rhine froze and the Germanic peoples crossed the river on foot: the Suebi, Vandals and Alans set out to conquer and plunder the lands of Gaul. In the autumn of 409 they entered Hispania.

The Germanic invasion coincided with the uprising of Constantine in 407, then commander of Britannia, against the emperor of the West, Flavius Honorius. Constantine established his capital at Arles in Gaul, sending his son, Caesar Constans, and his general Gerontius to conquer Lusitania, still loyal to Honorius, son of Theodosius I. On his return, Constantius passed through Caesaraugusta, leaving there his wife, Gerontius and most of his army. Gerontius decided to revolt against Constantine and Constans, making a pact with Alans, Suebi and Vandals for the division of the Peninsula and launching himself into the pursuit of Constans, whom he caught up with and killed. The fact indicates that the city was important enough both to be considered safe by Constans, and with the necessary resources to be the base of an uprising by Gerontius. Honorius reacted in 411, defeating both Constantine and Gerontius, but only managed to reconquer Tarraconensis, leaving the rest of Hispania in the hands of the Germanic tribes.

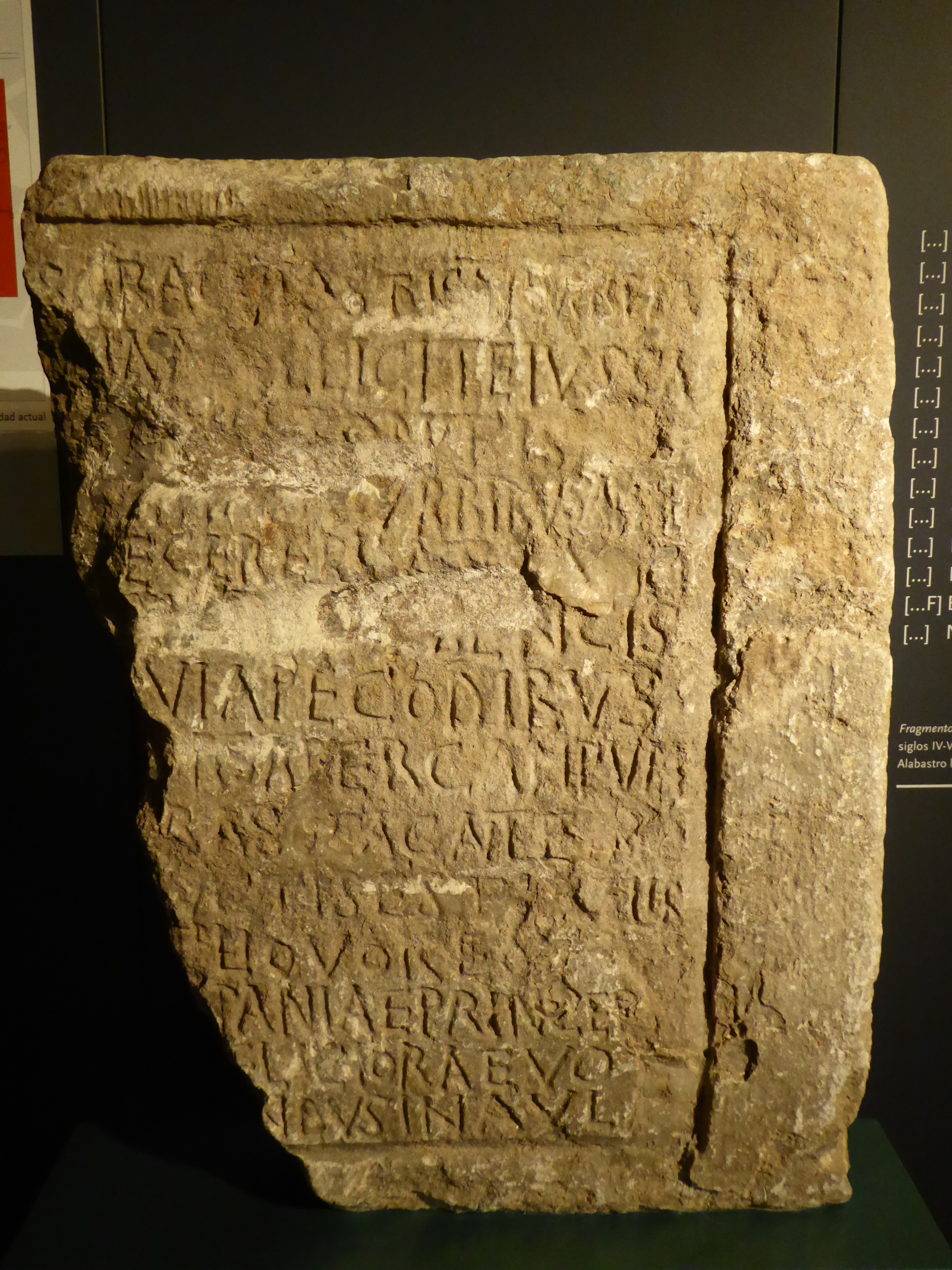
Fragment of a poetic epigraph from the 4th-5th centuries in local alabaster.

Archaeology shows that during the 5th century the public places of the city were abandoned. The forum was abandoned and the ashlars of the theater were reused in the construction of dwellings. These dwellings were often built precisely in these abandoned public spaces, which can be explained as an attempt to accommodate within the wall the rural populations fleeing the prevailing instability.

Caesaragusta was spared from the attacks of the Bagaudas between 441 and 454 thanks to its powerful walls. The problem was so important that Turiasu was assaulted, caught and massacred, even the bishop Leon died. To solve the problem, Theodoric II, king of the Visigoths, still under Roman obedience, sent his brother Frederic in command of an army.

The Caesaraugustan Chronicle records the last visit of a Roman emperor in 460. Emperor Majorian (457-461) stopped in Caesaragusta on his way to North Africa, which had fallen into the hands of the Asdingian Vandals. The fact is curious if it is considered that the logical way to go to Cartagena would have been by the coast, but perhaps the military importance of the city made him deviate.

In 472 the city was definitively conquered by a Visigoth army led by Count Gauterico, in the name of King Euric. Only four years later, in 476, Odoacer, leader of the Heruli, deposed the last Roman emperor of the West, which is usually considered as the end of the Western Roman Empire and the beginning of the Middle Ages.

== Bibliography ==
- Beltrán Lloris, Miguel and Guillermo Fatás Cabeza, ''Historia de Zaragoza, vol. 2. César Augusta, ciudad romana'' (in Spanish), Zaragoza, Ayuntamiento-Caja de Ahorros de la Inmaculada, 1998. ISBN 84-8069-145-X
- Escribano Paño, María Victoria (1998). "Zaragoza tardorromana (284-408)". Historia de Zaragoza. Zaragoza en la Antigüedad tardía (285-714) (in Spanish) (1st ed.). Ayuntamiento de Zaragoza & Caja de Ahorros de la Inmaculada. p. 93. ISBN 84-8069-147-6.
- Fatás, Guillermo (dir.), ''Guía Histórico-Artística de Zaragoza'' (in Spanish), Zaragoza, Institución «Fernando el Católico»-Ayto. de Zaragoza, 2008, 4th ed. revised and expanded by Antonio Mostalac Carrillo and María Pilar Biel Ibáñez, section «Arqueología y Patrimonio histórico-artístico (1992-2008)», p. 643-892. ''Cfr.'' especially the chapter «La Colonia Caesar Augusta», p. 669-708. ISBN 978-84-7820-948-4
- Lostal Pros, Joaquín; Ansón Navarro, Arturo (2001). Historia de cuatro ciudades: Salduie, Caesaraugusta, Saraqusta, Zaragoza (in Spanish). Zaragoza: Ayuntamiento, Servicio de Cultura: Caja Inmaculada. ISBN 84-8069-225-1.
