= CELSA =

CELSA could refer to:

- Celsa (Roman city)
- CELSA Group, multinational steel company based in Castellbisbal, Spain
- CELSA Paris, French communication and journalism school
