= Puente de Piedra (Zaragoza) =

Coordinates: 41°39′26″N 0°52′31″W

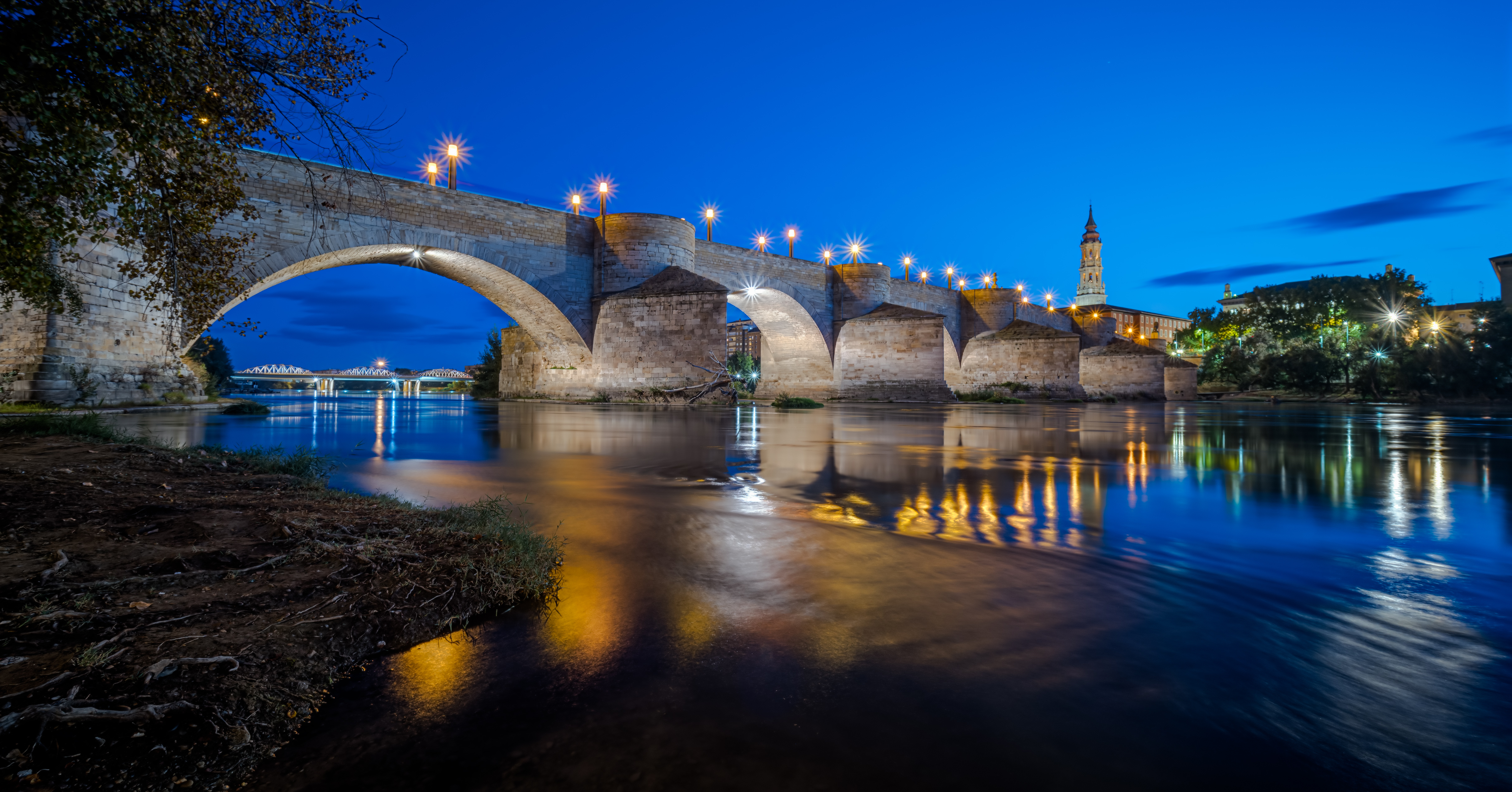
Puente de Piedra in the evening lights, 2019

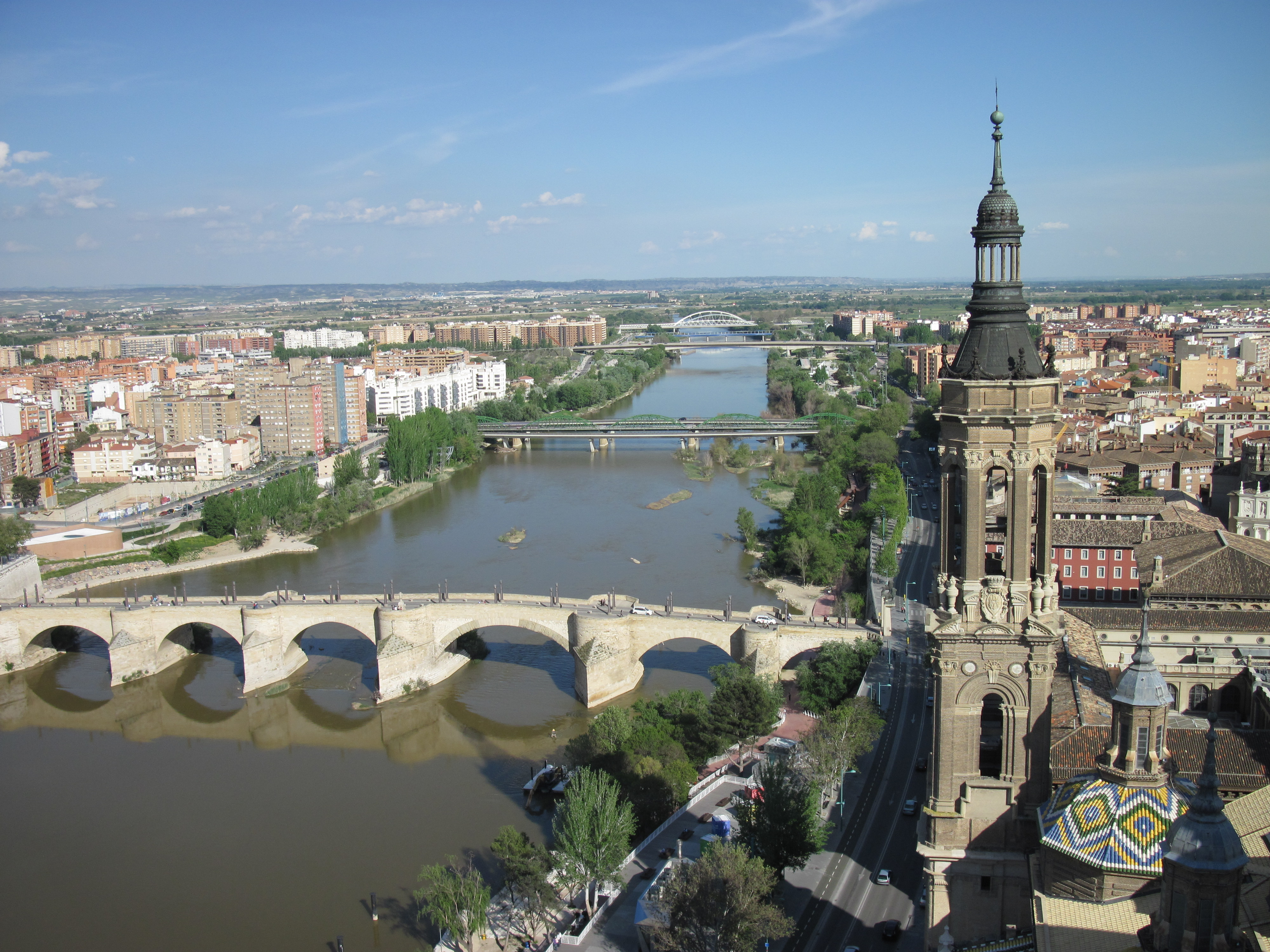
Zaragoza. Ebro. Puente de Piedra (2010)

The Puente de Piedra (English: Stone Bridge) is a bridge across the river Ebro in Zaragoza, Spain.

The Puente de Piedra is also called the Bridge of Lions because since 1991 four lions (symbols of the city) have been placed on the pillars at each end of the bridge. The lion statues were designed by Francisco Rallo Lahoz.

== History ==
Beginning in the 12th century the citizens of Zaragoza tried to build a bridge across the Ebro. In 1401–1440, the Puente de Piedra was built under the direction of Gil de Menestral. The flood in 1643 destroyed two central bridge spans. The bridge then looked as it does in the painting "View of Zaragoza" by Juan Bautista Martínez del Mazo (1647).

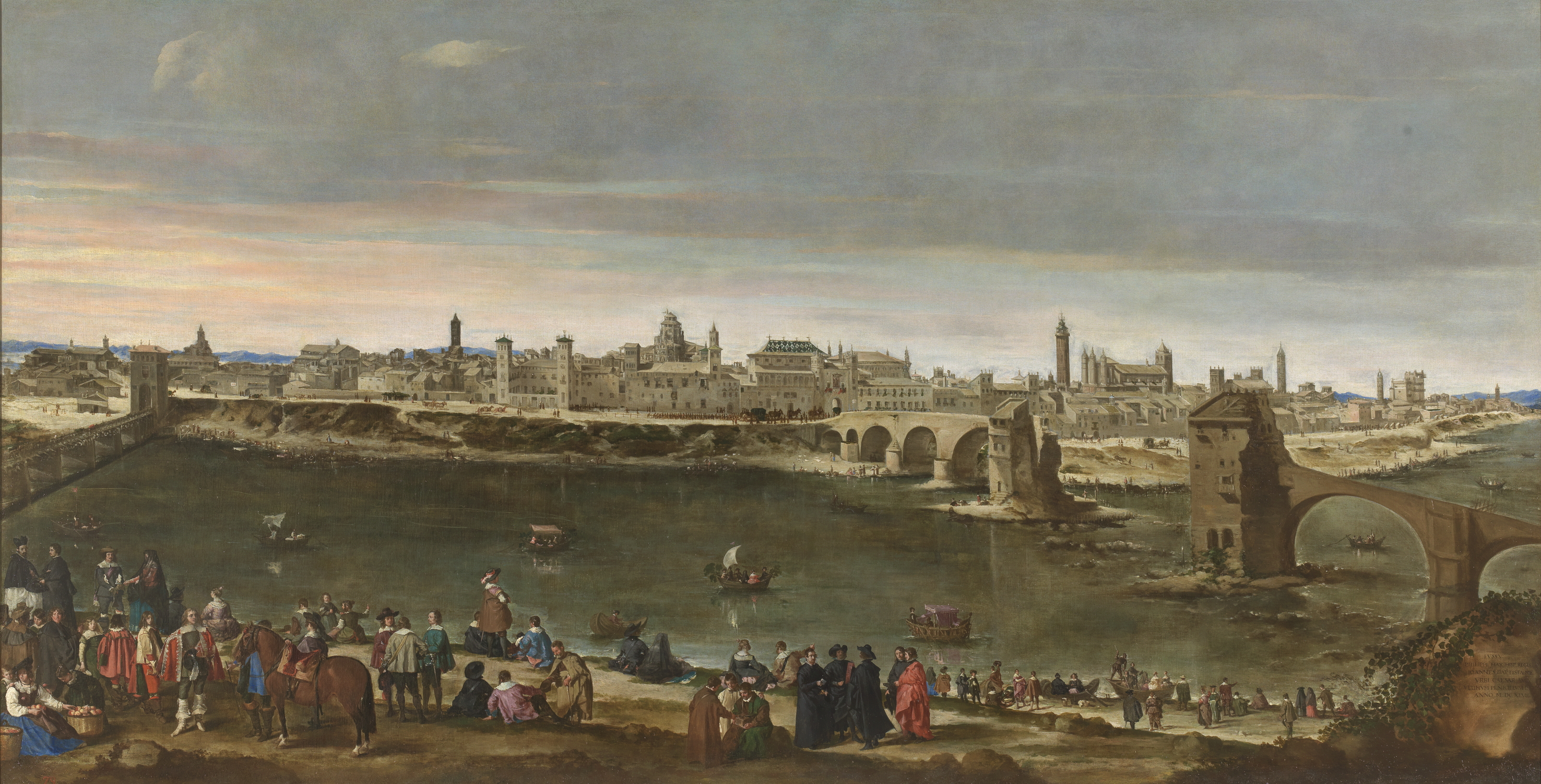
View of Zaragoza (1647), Juan Bautista Martínez del Mazo

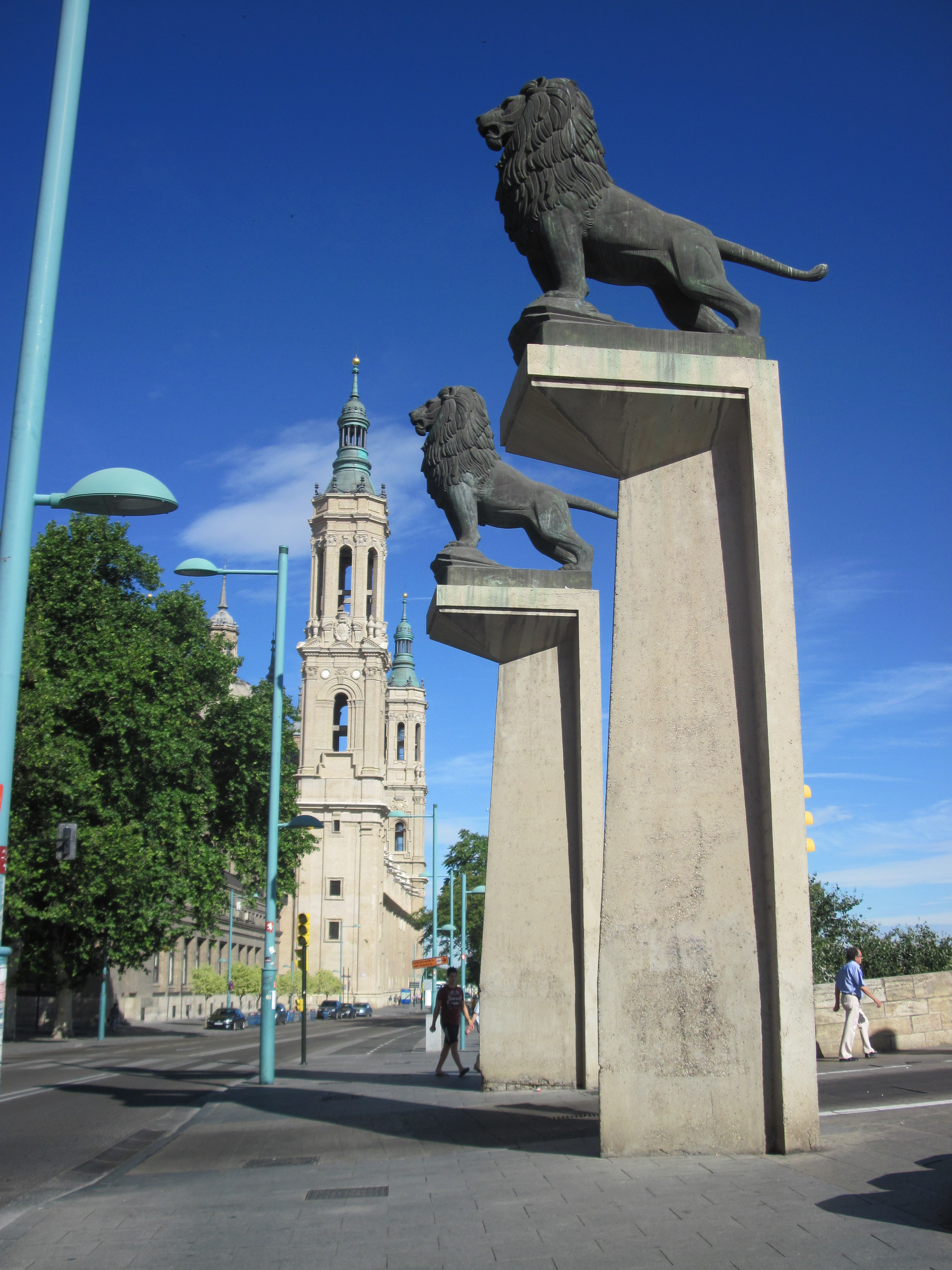
The lions on the pillars

In 1659 the bridge was reconstructed. Architect Felipe de Busignac restored two destroyed towers and expanded the bridge piers. In 1789, architect Agustín Sanz strengthened the Ebro's bank at the Monastery of St. Lazarus to prevent the risk of flooding of the bridge. The reconstruction of the bridge was of great economic importance for the development of the region and all the country.

== Literature ==
GUITART APARICIO, Cristóbal, «El Puente de Piedra», en Guillermo Fatás Cabeza, (coord.) Guía histórico-artística de Zaragoza, Zaragoza, Ayuntamiento (Servicio de acción cultural), 1991, págs. 197-200. ISBN 84-86807-76-X.
