= Honestiores and humiliores =

Roman legal distinction of personal status

In the later Roman Empire, honestiores and humiliores emerged as two broad distinctions of social and legal status, those who had held the higher offices (honores) and humbler people. The division starts to become apparent near the end of the 2nd century AD.

Those of senatorial and equestrian rank and those who had held an office at the level of decurion or higher possessed greater honors and therefore were honestiores. They made up around 1% of the Roman population.

Humiliores were any free persons who held Roman citizenship without having achieved the privileges of higher office, including ordinary working people, freedmen (liberti), peregrini (free non-citizens who lived within the empire), tenant farmers, and coloni.

The granting of universal citizenship to all free inhabitants of the empire in AD 212 seems to have exacerbated the division between the upper and lower classes. As the principles of citizen equality under the Roman Republic decayed, humiliores were increasingly subject to harsher legal penalties, such as corporal punishment or public humiliation, formerly reserved for slaves. Honestiores retained the rights that had been held by all Roman citizens, at least in theory, during the Republic, including freedom from corporal and capital punishment.

Paul B. Duff characterizes the attitude of the elite toward humiliores as a kind of loathing that regarded them as lazy and dishonest.

== Literature ==
- A. H. M. Jones (1964). The Later Roman Empire, 284-602: A Social Economic and Administrative Survey. Taylor & Francis.
- Krause, Jens-Uwe (Munich). "Honestiores/Humiliores". Brill's New Pauly.
