= Celsa (Roman city) =

Coordinates: 41.373°N 0.433°W

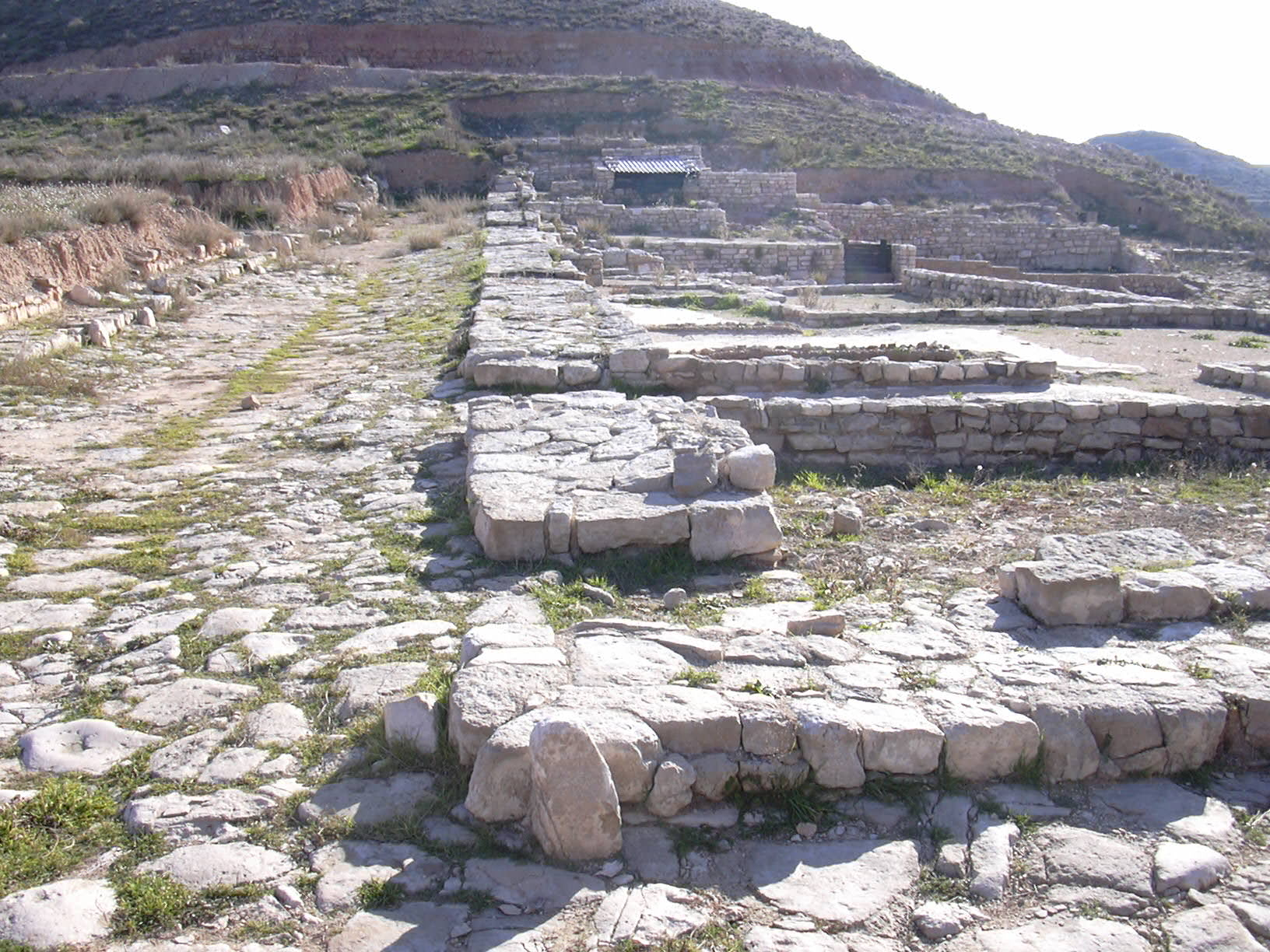
Street on Insula II

Celsa was an important pre-Roman and Roman city located near the modern town of Velilla de Ebro, Aragon, Spain.

Recent excavations have brought to light many rich private and public buildings which give a glimpse of its former grandeur.

== History ==
Celsa was originally an Iberian settlement, called Kelse, of the Ilergetes tribe. It was located in the middle reaches of the River Ebro at a privileged position on the natural route from the coast to the peninsula. It was sited on terraces rising from the river and dominating a strategic ford.

From the mid-second century to the first half of the first century BC, Kelse coined its own currency with representations of winged victories, Hercules and Venus; and this is the main documentation of the city.

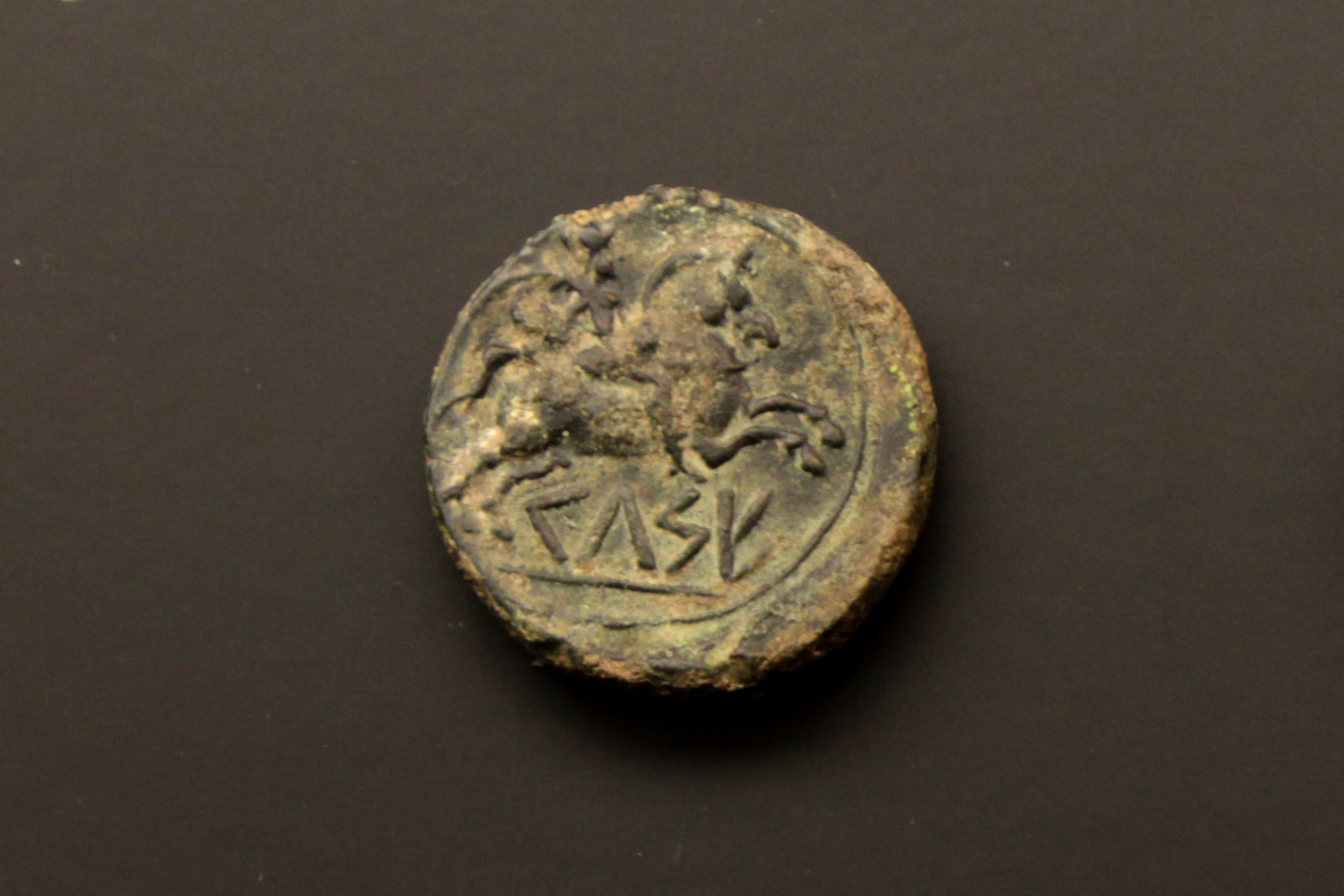
Bronze coin minted in Kelse in the 2nd century BC, showing its name in the Iberian language

It later had the only stone bridge over the upper Ebro, located in Velilla de Ebro, where remains of a bridge were reported in the 19th century.

Marcus Emilius Lepidus, governor of Hispania Citerior, founded a colony here in 44 BC with discharged veterans of the legions, who each received a plot of land to cultivate and the grant of Roman citizenship. It was known as Colonia Celsa Lepida, the highest rank of Roman city and one of the only two colonies in Aragon with Caesaraugusta. The new town occupied an area of about 44 ha (109 acres) and played a key role as a communications centre via Tarraco (Tarragona). The population eventually numbered about 4,000.

The settlement was soon renamed Colonia Victrix Iulia Celsa because Lepidus was removed from political office and exiled in 36 BC by Augustus, Caesar's successor. Celsa experienced a period of great splendour, but it was brief, and from the time of Nero it began to wane. Its decline is likely to be due to economic and administrative changes resulting from the creation of a new and thriving colony in the area, Caesaraugusta, which monopolised the main trade flows.

== Site ==
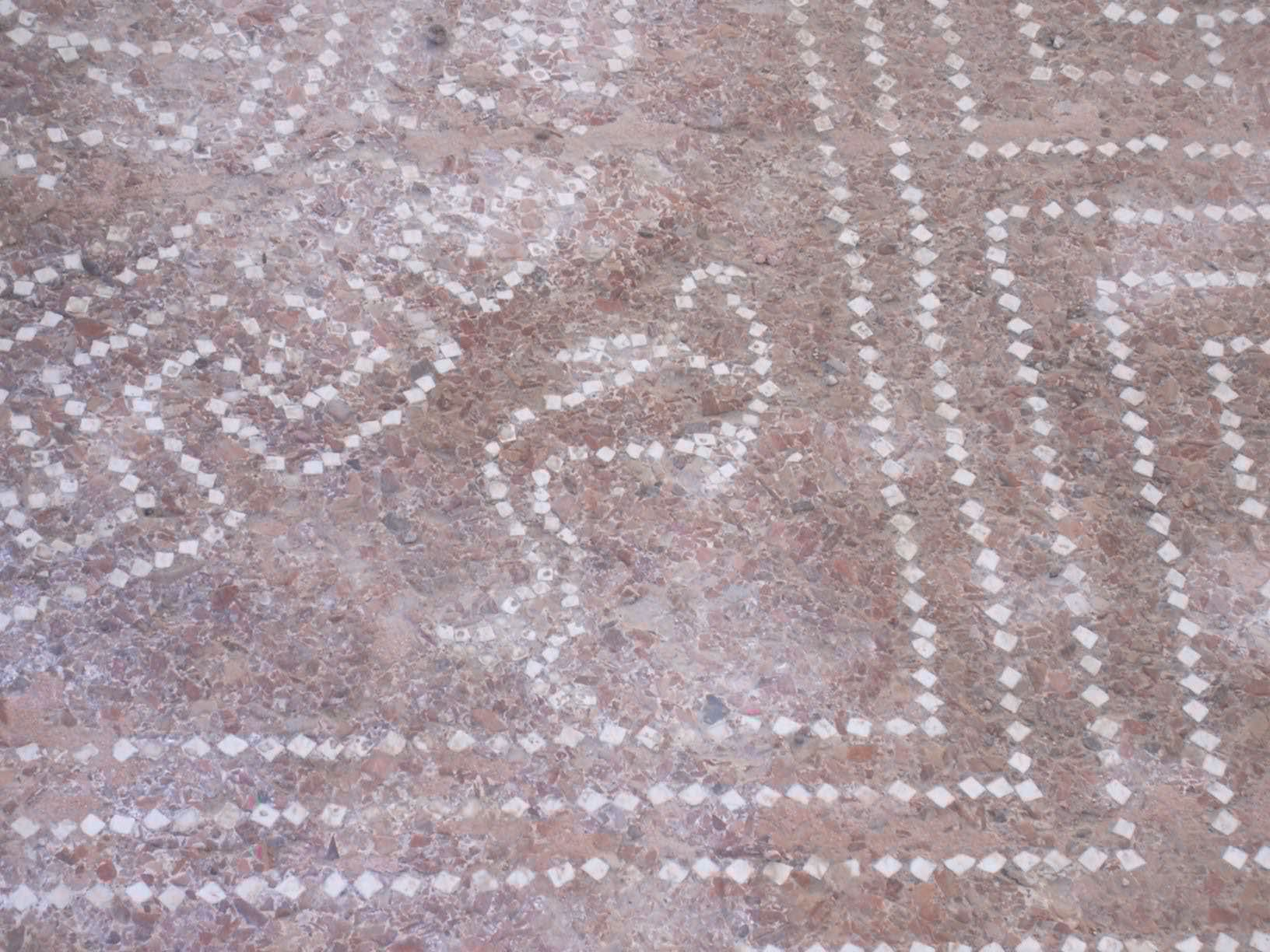
Mosaic in the House of the Dolphins

Whole neighbourhoods have been brought to light with paved streets and blocks of houses of several floors arranged around courtyards, in Roman fashion, and rooms decorated with mosaics and paintings are numerous. Commercial establishments such as warehouses, shops, a market and a bakery can be seen.

Roman architects carefully designed the street plan around the terraced slopes so that the streets evacuated rainwater into the Ebro because, unlike other Roman cities, it had no drains. For this reason, the main arteries of the city are parallel and perpendicular to the river.

Excavations have also unearthed remains of several residential buildings of great interest, among which are the Houses of the Dolphin and of Hercules, both with beautiful and important wall paintings.

=== House of Hercules ===
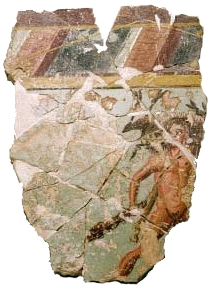
Fresco from the House of Hercules: Hercules and the Erymanthian boar

This latter house, of enormous dimensions, inaugurated the use of the Tuscan atrium in Celsa, one of the earliest types of italic-style house. Two stages can be seen in this house; the first (from the founding of the colony) centred around the Tuscan atrium and the second after the addition of the arcaded courtyard to the north, in the reign of Augustus. Rainwater collected in the impluvium of the atrium and was stored in a giant water tank located under room 29. The mosaic floors are of great beauty, especially in room 1, which also had walls adorned with paintings of the second Pompeian style, displaying several episodes of the labours of Hercules which gave its name to the house. The arcaded courtyard gave access to well-designed rooms for a peaceful and private life.

=== House of the Dolphin ===
The House of the Dolphin is so named after the beautiful dolphins that decorate the mosaic floors. It was altered several times after combining the two houses that initially occupied the insula, or block, up to the time of Claudius in 54 AD. This great mansion took shape in the first decade of the 1st c. AD, built around two spaces. The first part (rooms 1-14) corresponds to the public area and private rooms of the family; the second (15-22) is organised around an open courtyard with various rooms dedicated to services and slaves.

=== Other Buildings ===
The locations of possible temples, the theatre, the forum, major cisterns, springs, cemeteries and other public buildings have been identified. The theatre lies below the San José sanctuary where traces of the scaenae frons (stage) walls and tiers of seats (cavea) have been found.

Many small objects, such as lamps, Pompeian red slip dishes, Iberian ceramics, etc., as well as small bronzes, sculptural remains, coins and small pieces of jewellery are also preserved. A nearby museum displays many of the finds.

== Sources and further reading ==
- Holland, Tom, Rubicon: The Triumph and Tragedy of the Roman Republic, Abacus, 2004, ISBN 0-349-11563-X, 316.
- Colonia Lepida Celsa Velillaturismodezaragoza.es
