= Church of Santa Engracia de Zaragoza =

Church in Aragon, Spain

Coordinates: 41°38′56″N 0°52′58″W

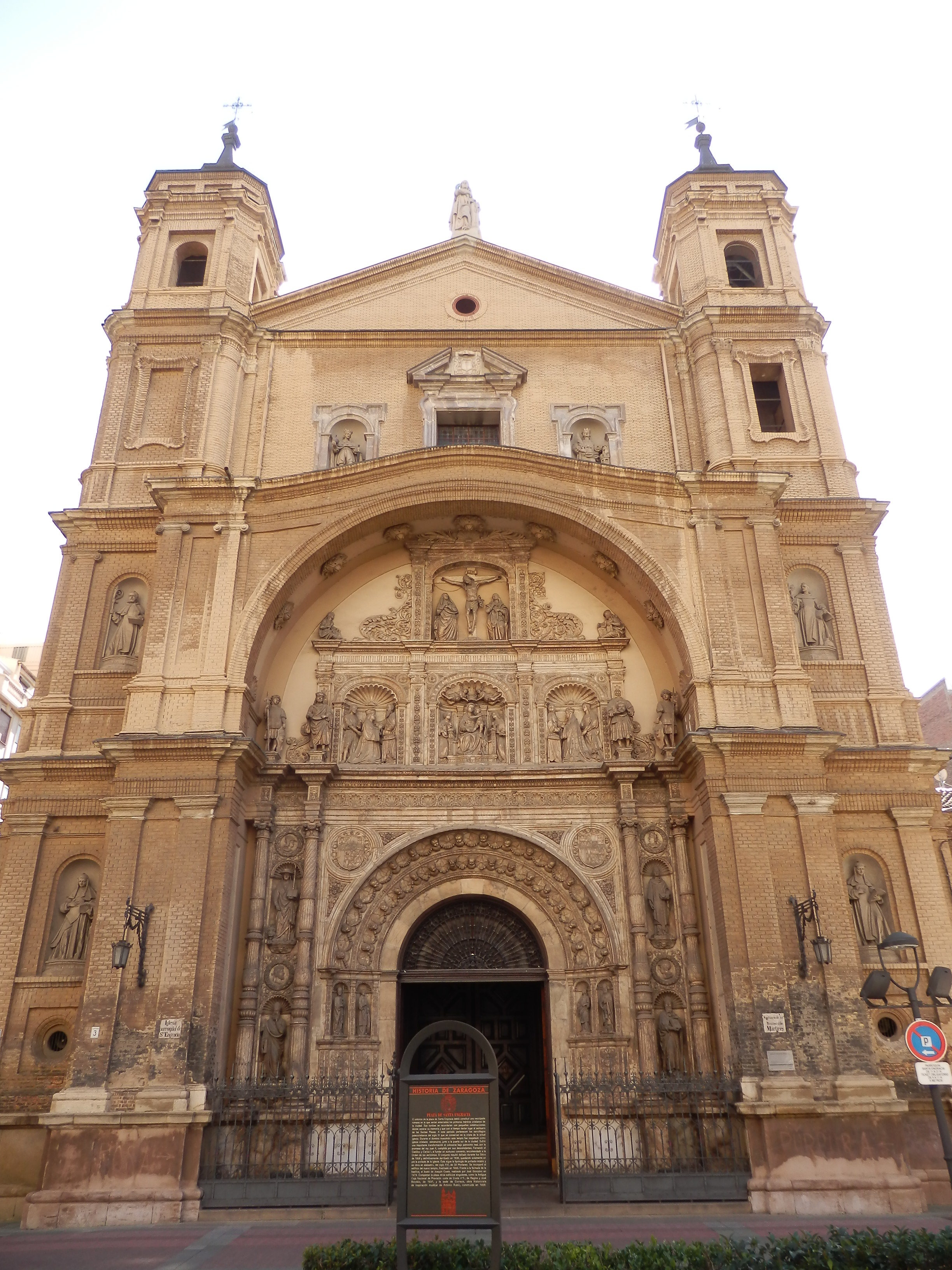
Basilica church of Santa Engracia de Zaragoza

The Church of Santa Engracia de Zaragoza is a basilica church in Zaragoza, Spain. It was built on the spot where Saint Engratia and her companions were said to have been martyred in 303 AD. The Basilica of Santa Engracia is located at Plaza de Santa Engracia.

== History ==
The Basilica of Santa Engracia is believed to have been built on the spot where Saint Engratia and her companions were said to have been martyred in 303 AD. Early in the fourth century, a tomb was built on the site of the Christian-Roman necropolis. Around 609 the Abbey of Santa Engracia was established to house the relics of Saint Engratia and the many martyrs of Saragossa.

The abbey was demolished around 1492 when Ferdinand II of Aragon founded the Hieronymus monastery of Santa Engracia. After his election to the papacy, Pope Hadrian VI passed through Zaragoza on his way to Rome, spending Holy Week at Santa Egratia. King Philip III visited in 1599.

The monastery church was largely destroyed in the Siege of Saragossa (1809) during the Spanish War of Independence, with only the crypt and the facade being left.

Pope John Paul II honored the church with the designation of a minor basilica on the occasion of his visit in 1982.

== Architecture ==
The façade was begun around 1511 by Gil Morlanes El Viejo and completed by his son five years later. It was modified between 1754 and 1759 after part of the church collapsed. Part of the façade is all that remains of the monastery church, when the present building was constructed between 1891 and 1899.

The most significant elements of the crypt are the two Early Christian sarcophagi of the fourth century, which were discovered in 1737.
