= Museo Goya - Colección Ibercaja - Museo Camón Aznar =

Spanish art museum

Coordinates: 41.65470°N 0.87828°W

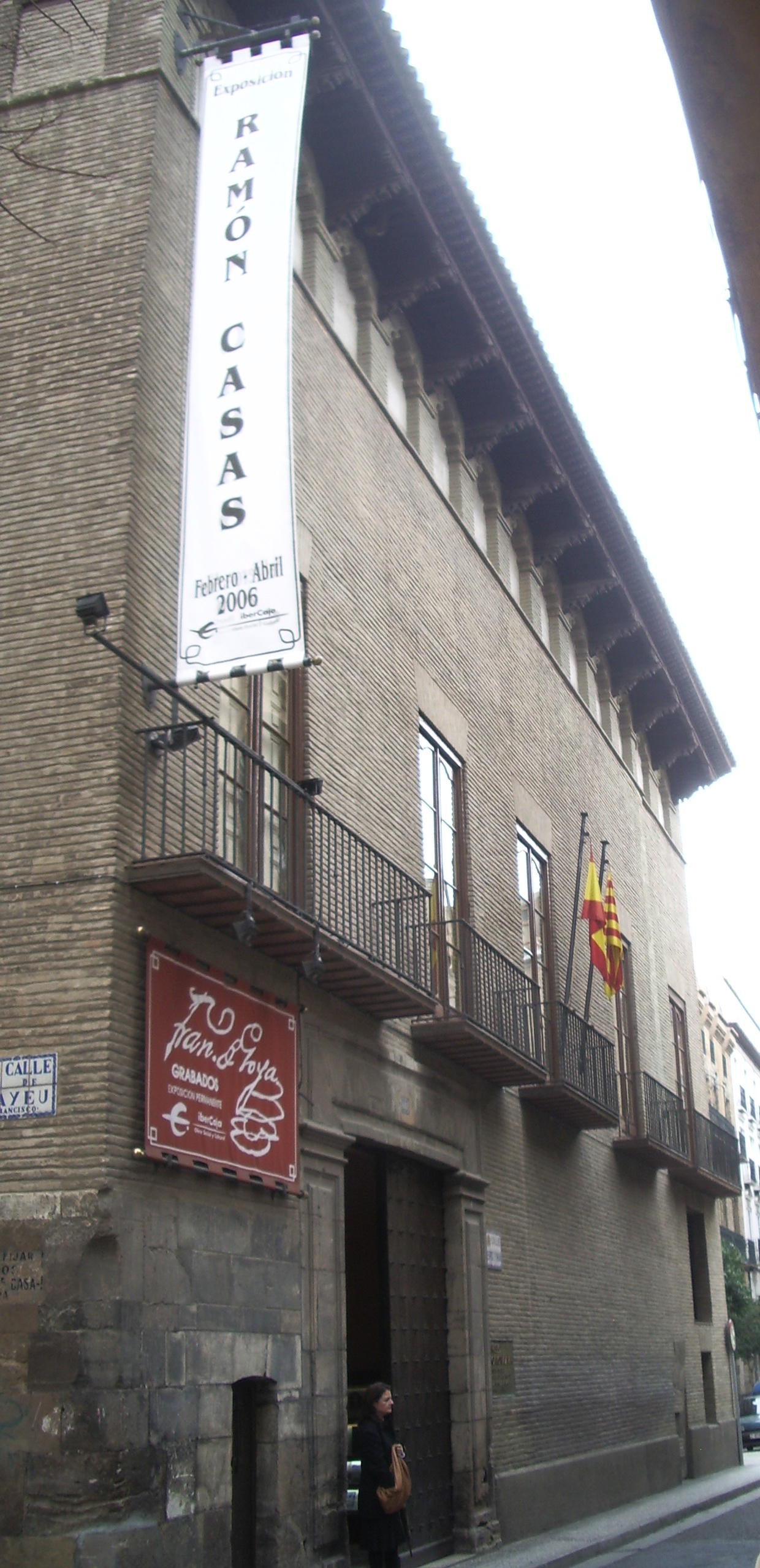
Casa Aguilar, where its located the Museo Goya

The Museo Goya - Colección Ibercaja - Museo Camón Aznar is a fine arts museum in Zaragoza, Spain. It opened in 1979 under the name Museo Camón Aznar, after José Camón Aznar, an art historian and art collector from the city who had contributed the nucleus of its collection. It houses also a collection of paintings and engravings by Francisco Goya.

The museum collection includes over 1,000 works, with around 500 on display. It was given its current name on 26 February 2015 after the addition of the Ibercaja collection and the works held by the Real Sociedad Económica Aragonesa de Amigos del País.

== History ==
The museum was opened in 1979 and is located in the Renaissance palace of the Pardo family in the historic centre of Zaragoza. It consists of several rooms spread over three floors.

The Obra Social de Ibercaja is in charge of managing the institution. When this financial institution was still called "Caja de Ahorros de Zaragoza, Aragón y Rioja", it signed an agreement with José Camón Aznar for the acquisition of this collection, on July 2, 1976. Previously, on February 27, 1976, the same institution had acquired the building where the museum exhibits its works.

Since its opening in 1979, it was originally called Museo Camón Aznar (Camón Aznar Museum), but since its reopening on February 26, 2015, it has been renamed the Museo Goya - Colección Ibercaja - Museo Camón Aznar (Goya Museum-Ibercaja Collection-Camón Aznar Museum). The museum has given the name Camón Aznar Room to the spaces intended for temporary exhibitions, as well as for a tribute space on the third floor. There has been some controversy over the change of name of the museum.

== The building ==
The museum is located at 23 Espoz y Mina Street, in the Renaissance palace of the Pardo family, built in 1535 by the Moorish architect Juan de Lanuza, and was the residence of Jerónimo Cosida y Violante de Albión. In 1808, during the War of Independence, it was the headquarters of the Captaincy General. After passing through several owners, it was bought by Ibercaja to be renovated and used for its Social Work, in 1976.

Since April 1, 2007, and for a period of approximately one year, the museum remained closed due to major renovations that transformed its interior. Work was carried on the comprehensive renovation of the museum spaces in the centre to give it an essential place to the only complete collection of Goya engravings that would be on display in a museum. The architectural project configured the museum as a chronological discourse around the figure of the Aragonese painter. The result was inaugurated in February 2008. It respects the central courtyard of the palace, supported by large marble columns that houses the reception area. The three floors of the museum cover a total area of 3,800 m^{2}.

The elements of historical value of the palace, such as the façade, the columns of the courtyard or the golden hall, were restored, while a new central skylight was installed.5 In its basement there are some monumental remains from the Roman period.

== Collection ==
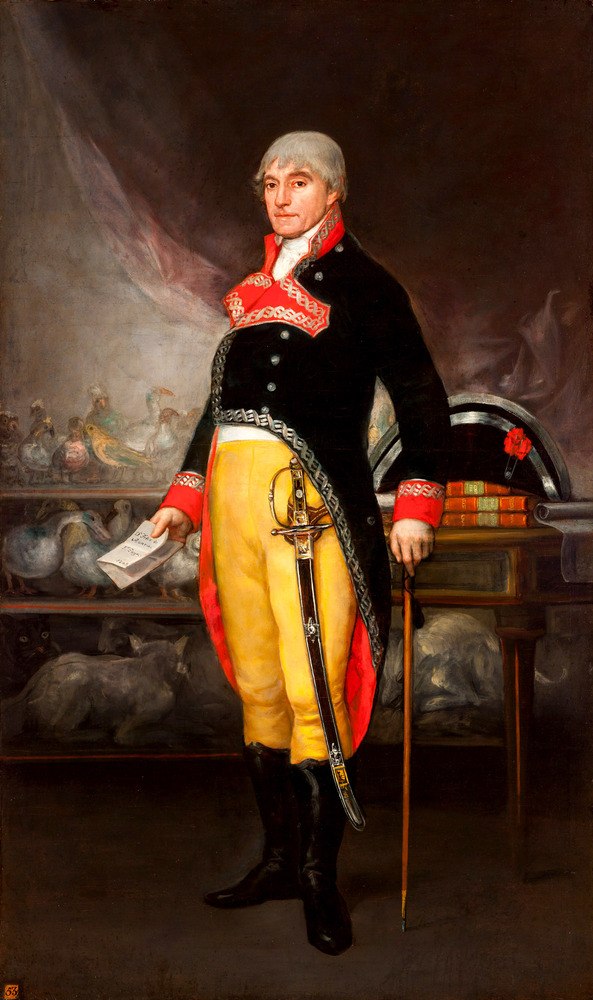
Portrait of Felix de Azara (1805) by Francisco Goya

The artworks collection is presented in 26 exhibition rooms and includes paintings, prints, drawings and some sculptures and ceramics. It includes works from the 15th to the 20th century.

=== Francisco Goya ===
The museum stands out for its collection of paintings and engravings from the Aragonese painter Francisco Goya. Among Goya's paintings in the museum there are:

- The Glory or Adoration of the Name of God (1771-1772)
- Saint Joachim (1772)
- Saint Anne (1772)
- Self-Portrait (1775)
- Aesop and Menippus (1778)
- Portrait of Maria Luisa of Parma (1789; modified c. 1799)
- Don Jose de Cistué y Coll (1788)
- Portrait of Felix de Azara (1805)
- The Second of May 1808 (sketch for the large painting in the Prado) (1814)
- Masked Ball or Masked Dancers under an Arch (c. 1815)

The museum has four series of engravings by Goya, highlighting a first edition of La Tauromaquia by the artist:

- Los Caprichos (3rd edition)
- Los desastres de la guerra (2nd edition)
- La Tauromaquia (1st edition)
- Los disparates (2nd edition)

The museum also houses copies of engravings by Diego Velázquez that were made by Goya. Also of note are the four lithographs of The Bulls of Bordeaux, acquired by Ibercaja for the museum.

The Ibercaja collection includes the nine works by Goya which they own, and six works, also by Goya, belonging to the Real Sociedad Económica Aragonesa de Amigos del País.

== See also ==
- Goya Museum, an art museum in Castres, France
