= Antisemitism in Spain =

Antisemitism in Spain is the expression through words or actions of an ideology of hatred towards Jews on Spanish soil.

== History ==
=== Anti-Judaism in Medieval Iberia ===
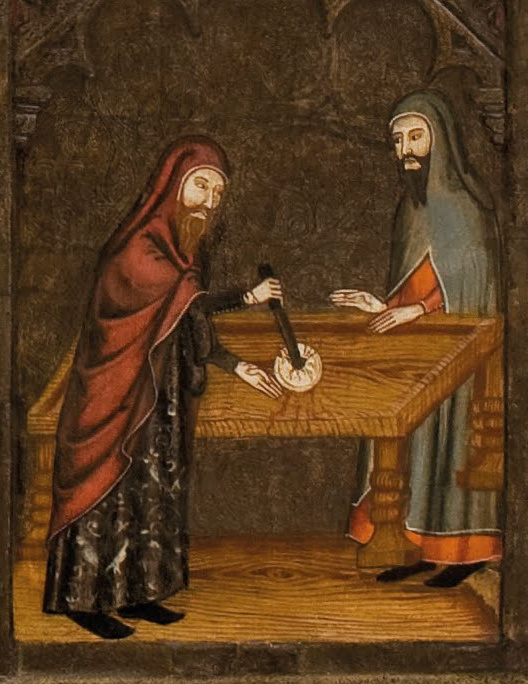
Detail of the altarpiece from the chapel of Corpus Christi in the church of the monastery of Santa Maria de Vallbona de les Monges, depicting Jews profaning the host, with a Jew stabbing a host that bleeds on the table.

Christian anti-Judaism began with the expansion of Christianity on the Iberian Peninsula during the rule of the Roman Empire. Its first violent manifestation occurred in the persecution of Jews in Visigothic Hispania. During the Middle Ages, Jews in al-Andalus, the Muslim-ruled Iberian Peninsula, were designated dhimmis, a protected class in Islam. Despite occasional violent outbursts such as the 1066 Granada massacre, Jews were granted protection to profess their religion in exchange for abiding to certain conditions that limited their rights concerning Muslims.

After the Almoravid invasion from Morocco in the 11th century, the situation of the Jewish population in Muslim territory worsened. During the invasion of the extremist Zahiri-ruled Almohad Caliphate of North Africa, many Jews fled to the northern Christian kingdoms, the Eastern Mediterranean, and the parts of North Africa outside of Almohad control.

Iberian Jews lived in relative peace next to their Christian neighbors. The kings, especially those of the Kingdom of Aragon, regarded the Jews as royal property and it was in their interest to protect them. During this time, the Jews enjoyed relative political freedom, they had posts in the courts and were merchants and businessmen. The Jews used to live separately in juderías or "Jewish quarters".

The dynastic change entailed by the ascension of the House of Trastámara after the Castilian Civil War saw a radicalization of the antisemitic sentiment across the aforementioned crown of Castile, with a convergence of religious doctrinal anti-Judaism, aristocratic political antisemitism, and popular antisemitism exacerbated by the ongoing social and economic crisis of the Late Middle Ages.

Blood libel accusations were spreading and decrees were imposed on the Jewish people. The situation peaked with the Massacre of 1391, in which entire communities were murdered and many were forcibly converted.

=== Early Modern era ===
In 1492, via the Alhambra Decree, the Catholic Monarchs of Spain ordered the expulsion of a disputed number of Jews from the Crowns of Castile and Aragon, ranging from 45,000 to 200,000, and thus put an end to the largest communities in Europe. The expulsion of the Jews from Navarre followed suit in 1498. The coerced baptisms eventually produced the phenomenon of the conversos, the Inquisition and statutes of limpieza de sangre.

Conspiracies about conversos featured in a notable number of vernacular works printed in the territory of current-day Spain as well as the rest of Iberia throughout the early modern era, underpinning the image of Judaizing conversos as the quintessential folk devils.

=== Modern antisemitism ===
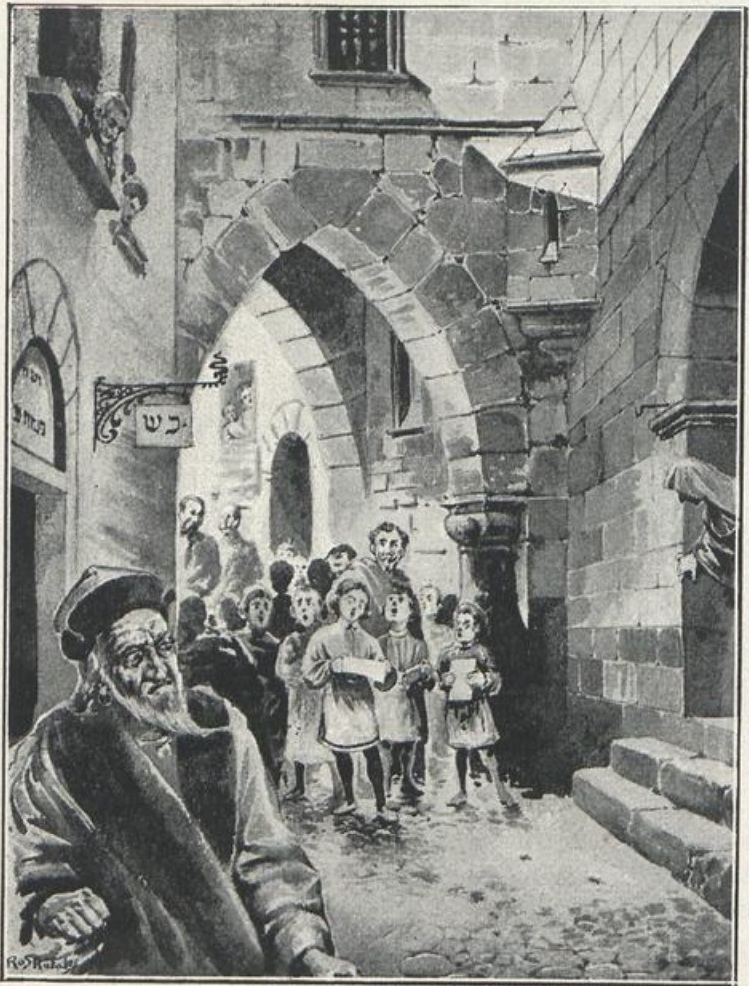
Illustration of the blood libel of "Dominguito del Val" as published in La Hormiga de Oro, a Carlist-leaning magazine, in 1906.

Modern antisemitism came to Spain through France. Édouard Drumont's antisemitic tract La France juive was edited in Spain as early as 1889, translated by Pelegrín Casabó y Pagés, who also published an analogous La España judía in 1891. The brand of antisemitism imbued of the Judeo-Masonic conspiracy theory increased in Catholic publications after 1898.

Following the October Revolution and the founding of the Spanish Communist Party in 1920, such "anti-Spanish forces" were primarily identified with the "destructive communist virus", which was often considered to be guided by the Jews.

The 1931–45 period saw the peak of modern antisemitism in Spain, which was primarily embraced by the extreme right. In a country with few Jews, this discourse was functional from an ideological standpoint to the rallying of the conservative forces against republicanism and the workers' movement rather than the minuscule Jewish community. The Francoist winning side emerging from the 1936–39 Civil War repressed the Jews, prohibiting their worship and their organizations except in North Africa.

It was during the 1960s that the first Spanish neo-Nazi groups appeared, such as CEDADE. Later on, Spanish Neo-Nazis attempted to use antisemitic discourse to explain the political transition to democracy (1976–1982) after the death of Franco. It drew on the same ideas that had been expressed in 1931 when the Second Spanish Republic was proclaimed; political revolutions could be explained as the result of various "intrigues".

In 1978, Jews were recognised as full citizens in Spain, and today the Jewish population numbers about 40,000, approximately 0.1% of Spain's population, 20,000 of whom are registered in the Jewish communities. Most live in the larger cities of Spain on the Iberian Peninsula, North Africa or the islands.

On 1 August 2026, the statue of Maimonides in Córdoba was vandalized with a swastika. On 8 September 2026, Real Madrid supporters made Nazi salutes and chanted "Jew that I see, Jew that I hit" before a match against Inter Milano.

== Data and analysis ==
Antisemitic events in Spain recorded by the Observatorio de antisemitismo en España, 2009–2011
	2009	2010	2011
Internet	-	1	2
Media	10	3	7
Attacks on property	4	1	2
Attacks on persons	5	4	2
Trivialisation of the Holocaust	-	1	3
Delegitimizing Israel	-	-	5
Incidents	-	1	1
Instigation to antisemitism	-	1	2
Legal decisions	-	6	-
Total	19	12	30

Surveys from the 1980s and 1990s showed that the Spanish image of the Jews was ambivalent: pejorative stereotypes such as avariciousness, treachery and deicide contrasted with positive evaluations such as their work ethic and their sense of responsibility. In 1998, a survey conducted of 6,000 students in 145 Spanish schools showed a slight increase in racist attitudes compared with 1993 - 14.9 percent would expel the Jews compared with 12.5 percent in 1993. In spring 2002, many EU member states, including Spain, experienced a wave of antisemitic incidents which started with the 'Al-Aqsa-Intifada' in October 2000 and was fueled by the conflict in the Middle East. During the first half of 2002, the rise of antisemitism reached a climax in the period between the end of March and mid-May, running parallel to the escalation of the Middle East Conflict.

According to a September 2008 study published by the Pew Research Center of Washington DC, nearly half of all Spaniards have negative views of Jews, a statistic that marks Spain as one of the most antisemitic countries in Europe. According to Pew, 46% of Spaniards held negative opinions of Jews, more than double the 21% of Spaniards with such views in 2005. Spain was also the only country in Europe where negative views of Jews outweighed positive views; only 37% of Spaniards thought favorably about Jews.

In September 2009, the ADL published a special report titled "Polluting the Public Square: Anti-Semitic Discourse In Spain." Following the report, Abraham H. Foxman, ADL National Director, said, "We are deeply concerned about the mainstreaming of anti-Semitism in Spain, with more public expressions and greater public acceptance of classic stereotypes. Among the major European countries, only in Spain have we seen viciously anti-Semitic cartoons in the mainstream media, and street protests where Israel is accused of genocide and Jews are vilified and compared to Nazis [...] Opinion makers in Spain are crossing the line that separates legitimate criticism of Israeli actions from anti-Semitism, and the results are evident. Our polling shows an alarming rise in anti-Semitic attitudes."

Trends in Anti-Semitic Attitudes in Spain
Percent responding “probably true”
- 2002
- 2004
- 2005
- 2007
- 2009
- 2012

According to the "Report on Anti-Semitism in Spain in 2010" which was jointly produced by the Observatory on Anti-Semitism in Spain and a nongovernmental organization called the Movement against Intolerance in 2010, while Spain was mired in the worst economic recession in its modern history, it emerged as one of the most antisemitic countries in the EU. According to a poll commissioned by the Spanish Ministry of Foreign Affairs, 58.4% of Spaniards believe that "the Jews were powerful because they controlled the economy and the mass media. This number reached 62.2% among university students and 70.5% among those who are "interested in politics." More than 60% of Spanish university students said they did not want Jewish classmates. In other polling data, more than one-third (34.6%) of Spanish people had an unfavorable or completely unfavorable opinion of Jewish people. Another interesting finding is that antisemitism was more prevalent in the political left than it is on the political right - 34% of those on the far right said they are hostile to Jews, while 37.7% of those on the center-left were hostile to Jews. Sympathy for Jews among the extreme right (4.9 on a scale of 1–10) is above the average for the population as a whole (4.6). Among those who recognized themselves as having "antipathy for the Jewish people," only 17% says this was due to the "conflict in the Middle East." Nearly 30% of those surveyed said their dislike of Jews had to do with "their religion," "their customs," and "their way of life," while early 20% of Spaniards said they dislike Jews although they do not know why.

During 2010, Casa Sefarad-Israel decided to carry out a detailed sociological study (both qualitative and quantitative), with the following main goals:

- To determine the degree of antisemitism in Spain
- To examine its origin
- To diagnose its intensity

The qualitative study showed there has been a decline in traditional antisemitic attitudes, which were still present in some sectors, and an increase in those of a political and/or economic type. According to the quantitative study, in April 2010, 34.6% of the Spanish population expressed an unfavorable opinion on Jews, while 48% expressed a favorable opinion on Jews. It is noteworthy that the unfavorable attitudes towards Jews were at the same level as those regarding other groups addressed, including Orthodox Christians and Protestants. It is particularly significant that as a source of problems in Spain, Jews were considered to be at the same level as were Catholics. The results obtained from segmentation of the study population confirmed the existence of fairly homogeneous attitudes – both favorable and unfavorable – towards all religious groups in general, rather than any differentiated opinion with respect to the Jews. Among the reasons cited by the respondents for expressing unfavorable attitudes towards Jews, 17.5% pointed to Israel's role in the Middle East conflict, while 31.3% pointed to this factor as the reason why Jews are perceived as creating problems in the world. These findings confirmed that a significant proportion of the negative evaluation of Jews and Jewishness among the Spanish population was due to a perceived association between Jews as a religious group and the State of Israel and its policies. Among the reasons cited by those who consider Jews to create problems in Spain, the most significant one (cited by 11.4% of respondents) was the association with issues that are characteristic of immigration in general. This confirmed that part of the population in Spain viewed the Jews as an alien group, and extended its negative perceptions of this group toward the difference in general, concerning both its origin and its religion. Regarding opinions on Israel and the Middle East, both Israel and Palestine were viewed unfavorably by the majority of the study population. Regarding the perception of the Middle East conflict, 67.2% of those interviewed held both parties to be responsible to some degree. Similarly, the questions on the Middle East conflict produced a majority of results clearly recognizing the legitimacy of the State of Israel.

According to some, derived from the fact that almost all Spaniards are Catholic, and Spain remains one of the most homogeneous Western countries, Spanish Judeophobia reflects a national obsession with religious and ethnic unity which is based on the conception of an imaginary "internal enemy" plotting the downfall of the Catholic religion and the traditional social order. However, that assumption clashes with the fact that 21st-century Spain is one of the most secularised countries in Europe, with only 3% of Spaniards considering religion as one of their three most important values and thus not linking it to their national or personal identity. Furthermore, in modern Spain there is not an "internal enemy" scare but in far-right circles, which are more often focused against Muslim immigration as well as Catalan and Basque separatism, way more visible phenomena. Modern antisemitic-like attitudes in Spain utilizes perceived abusive policies of the State of Israel against Palestinians and in the international scene rather than to any kind of religious or identity obsession as a justification for anti-Jewish sentiments, and it has been defined by Jewish authors as an "antisemitism without antisemites" despite such rhetoric still being ostensibly antisemitic.

== Antisemitism in the media ==
Some important elements differentiate the Spanish media from its European counterparts:

- Uniformity of opinion across ideological lines - There are few writers who consistently go beyond stereotypes or denounce manipulation.
- Anti-Americanism - The level of intensity was higher in Spain, due to former Prime Minister Aznar's role in the war in Iraq, in comparison to the anti-Bush and antiwar policy of the Socialist government.
- Intensity - Antisemitic discourse in the Spanish media has a long history and reaches levels of intensity that would be considered unacceptable elsewhere in Europe. It should be mentioned that when confronted with the accusation of antisemitism, journalists, as well as editors and opinion columnists in the press, generally deny it, claiming they are justifiably criticizing the policies of Israel.

During the past decade, historical Catholic antisemitic stereotypes returned in the media when it came to the Middle East coverage. Medieval antisemitic tropes rooted in the religious tradition emerged from time to time in the representation of the Israeli-Arab conflict in the mainstream press. During the years of the Second Intifada and throughout the 2006 Lebanon War, Spanish newspapers and magazines published cartoons in which Israelis, Israel as a whole, or Jewish symbols were linked to the killing of children, themes of vengeance and cruelty, echoing ancient anti-Jewish imagery. Likewise, this merges with newer stereotypes such as charges of sowing disorder, subjugation of others, and the analogies between Israelis and Nazis - sometimes through direct comparisons. For example, on 23 April 2002, at the height of Operation Defensive Shield, the highly satirical magazine El Jueves (Thursday) displayed on its front page a caricature of Ariel Sharon, the Prime Minister of Israel, with a pig's face, a skull cap, a swastika and the caption "This wild animal."

A contemporary example of antisemitism in the Spanish Media is the posting of 17,500 antisemitic tweets following Maccabi Tel Aviv B.C.'s win of the EuroLeague on May 18, 2014. Angry Spanish supporters created an expletive antisemitic hashtag in their messages after the match, which briefly became one of the most popular keywords on Twitter in Spain. Twelve Jewish associations filed a judicial complaint after seeing references in some messages to death camps and the mass murder of Jews in the Holocaust. The organizations singled out five people who were identified by their real names on Twitter, accusing them of “incitement to hatred and discrimination” — a crime punishable by up to three years’ jail in Spain.

Modern antisemitic-like attitudes in Spain are mostly related to the perceived abusive policies of the Israel against Palestinians and the State of Palestine and in the international scene and it has been defined by Jewish authors as an "antisemitism without antisemites."

== See also ==
- Antisemitism in Europe
- Matar judíos

== Bibliography ==
- Álvarez Chillida, Gonzalo (2002). El antisemitismo en España: la imagen del judío, 1812-2002. Madrid: Marcial Pons Historia. ISBN 84-95379-44-9.
- Álvarez Chillida, Gonzalo (2007). "La eclosión del antisemitismo español: de la II República al Holocausto". El antisemitismo en España. Cuenca: Ediciones de la Universidad de Castilla-La Mancha. ISBN 978-84-8427-471-1.
- Cantera-Montenegro, Enrique (2019). "Los judíos de Castilla ante el cambio de dinastía". Memoria y Civilización. 22. Pamplona: University of Navarre: 143–161. doi:10.15581/001.22.028. hdl:10171/58536. ISSN 1139-0107.
- García Sanjuán, Alejandro (2001). "Tolerancia, convivencia y coexistencia en al-Andalus, ¿mito o realidad?". Desperta Ferro (7). ISSN 2171-9276.
- Glazer-Eytan, Yonatan (2019). "Jews Imagined and Real: Representing and Prosecuting Host Profanation in Late Medieval Aragon". In Franco Llopis, Borja; Urquízar-Herrera, Antonio (eds.). Jews and Muslims Made Visible in Christian Iberia and Beyond, 14th to 18th Centuries. Leiden: Brill. ISBN 978-90-04-39016-4.
- Hinojosa Montalvo, José (2000). "Los judíos en la España medieval: de la tolerancia a la expulsión". In Mª Desamparados Martínez San Pedro (ed.). Los marginados en el mundo medieval y moderno : Almería, 5 a 7 de noviembre de 1998 (PDF). Almería: Instituto de Estudios Almerienses. ISBN 84-8108-206-6.
- Soyer, François (2019). Antisemitic Conspiracy Theories in the Early Modern Iberian World. Narratives of Fear and Hatred. Leiden: Brill. ISBN 978-90-04-39550-3.
