= Cathedral of the Savior of Zaragoza =

Roman Catholic church in Spain

- Catedral del Salvador de Zaragoza
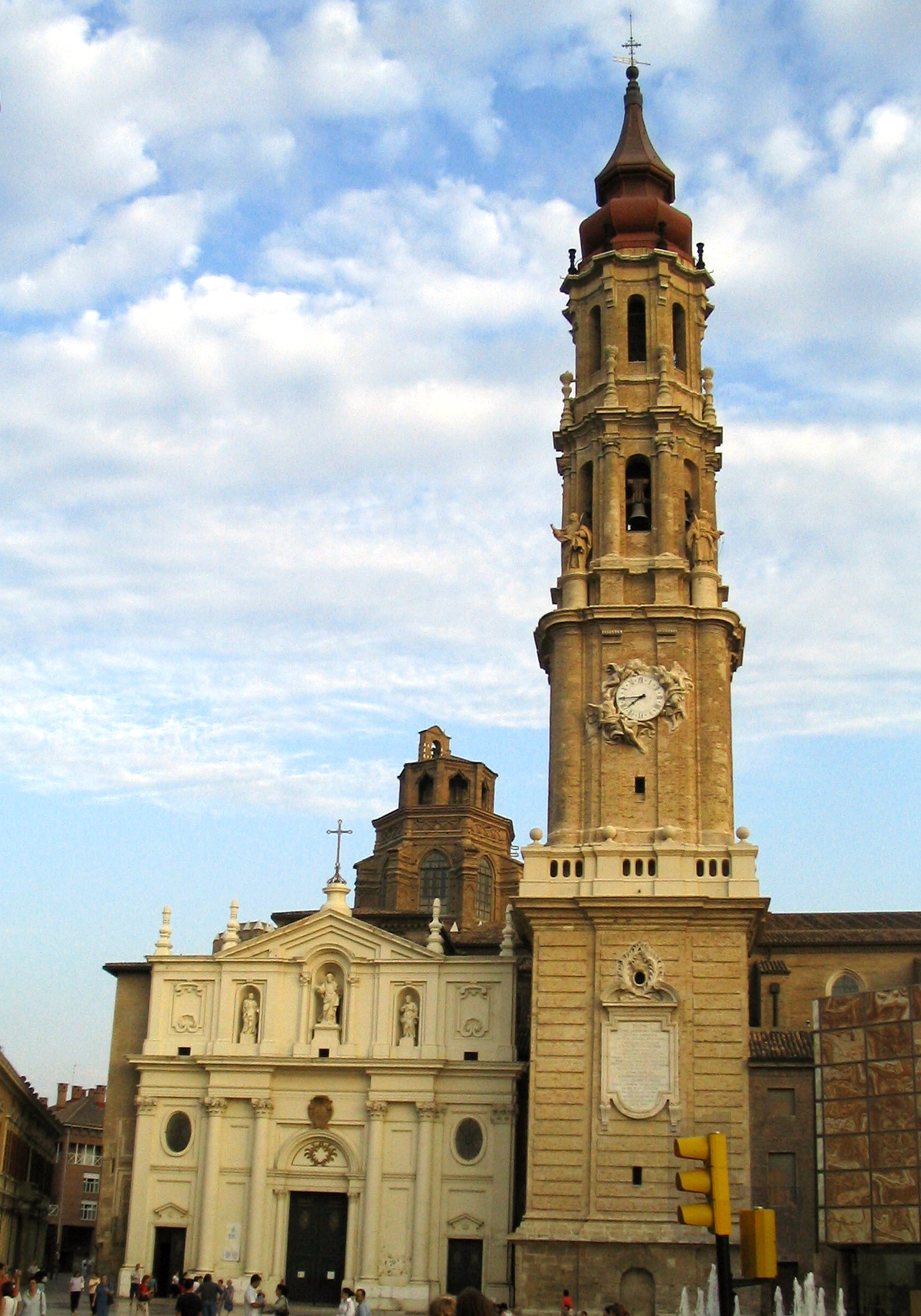
- Main façade of the cathedral The façade of the Cathedral of the Savior of Zaragoza (La Seo de Zaragoza) 2026.

Religion
- Affiliation: Catholic
- Province: Archdiocese of Zaragoza
- Rite: Roman Rite
- Ecclesiastical or organisational status: Cathedral
- Year consecrated: 1318

Location
- Location: Zaragoza, Spain
- Interactive map of Cathedral of the Savior of Zaragoza
- Coordinates: 41.65456°N 0.87585°W

Architecture
- Type: Church
- Style: Romanesque, Gothic, Mudéjar
- UNESCO World Heritage Site
- Criteria: Cultural: (iv)
- Designated: 2001 (25th session)
- Parent listing: Mudéjar Architecture of Aragon
- Reference no.: 378-010
- Spanish Cultural Heritage
- Type: Non-movable
- Criteria: Monument
- Designated: 3 June 1931
- Reference no.: RI-51-0001028

The Cathedral of the Savior (Spanish: Catedral del Salvador) or La Seo de Zaragoza is a Catholic cathedral in Zaragoza (also known as Saragossa), in Aragon, Spain. It is part of the World Heritage Site Mudéjar Architecture of Aragon.

The cathedral is located on the Plaza de la Seo and is commonly known as La Seo (Aragonese for "see") to distinguish it from the nearby El Pilar, whose name (pillar) is a reference to an apparition of Mary in Zaragoza. They both share co-cathedral status in metropolitan Zaragoza.

== History ==
=== Origin ===
The location of the Seo has its roots in the old Roman forum. Unlike other Roman city forums, the forum of Caesaraugusta was not located at the confluence of the Cardo and the Decumanus, but instead near the Ebro river, adjoining the river port. The forum, besides being the civic and commercial center of the city, contained the main temple. The Museum of the Forum is found below the plaza del Pilar, across from the facade of the cathedral. There have been no remains found of either a Visigoth or a Mozarabic church.

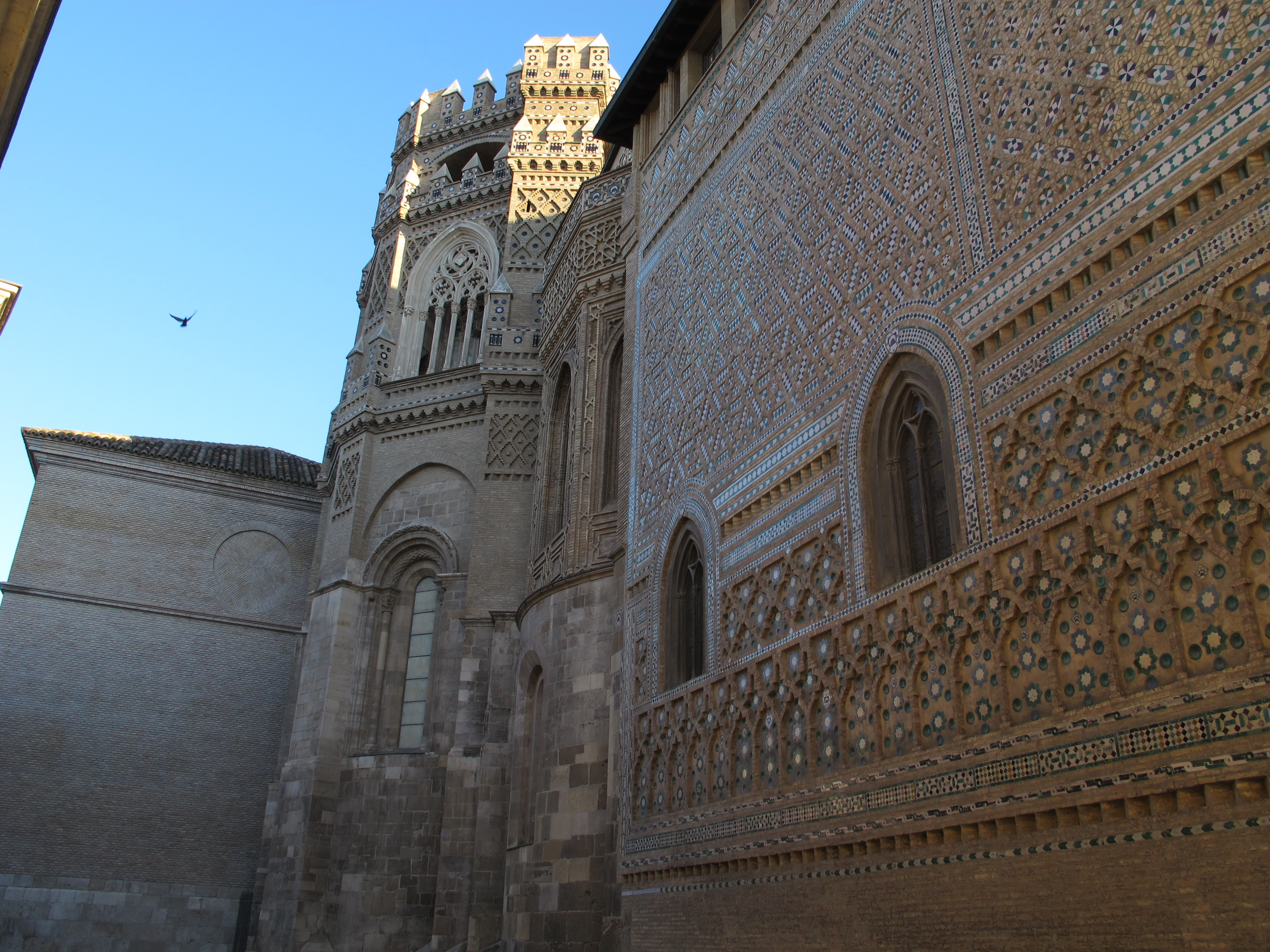
Romanesque apse with mudéjar and gothic additions

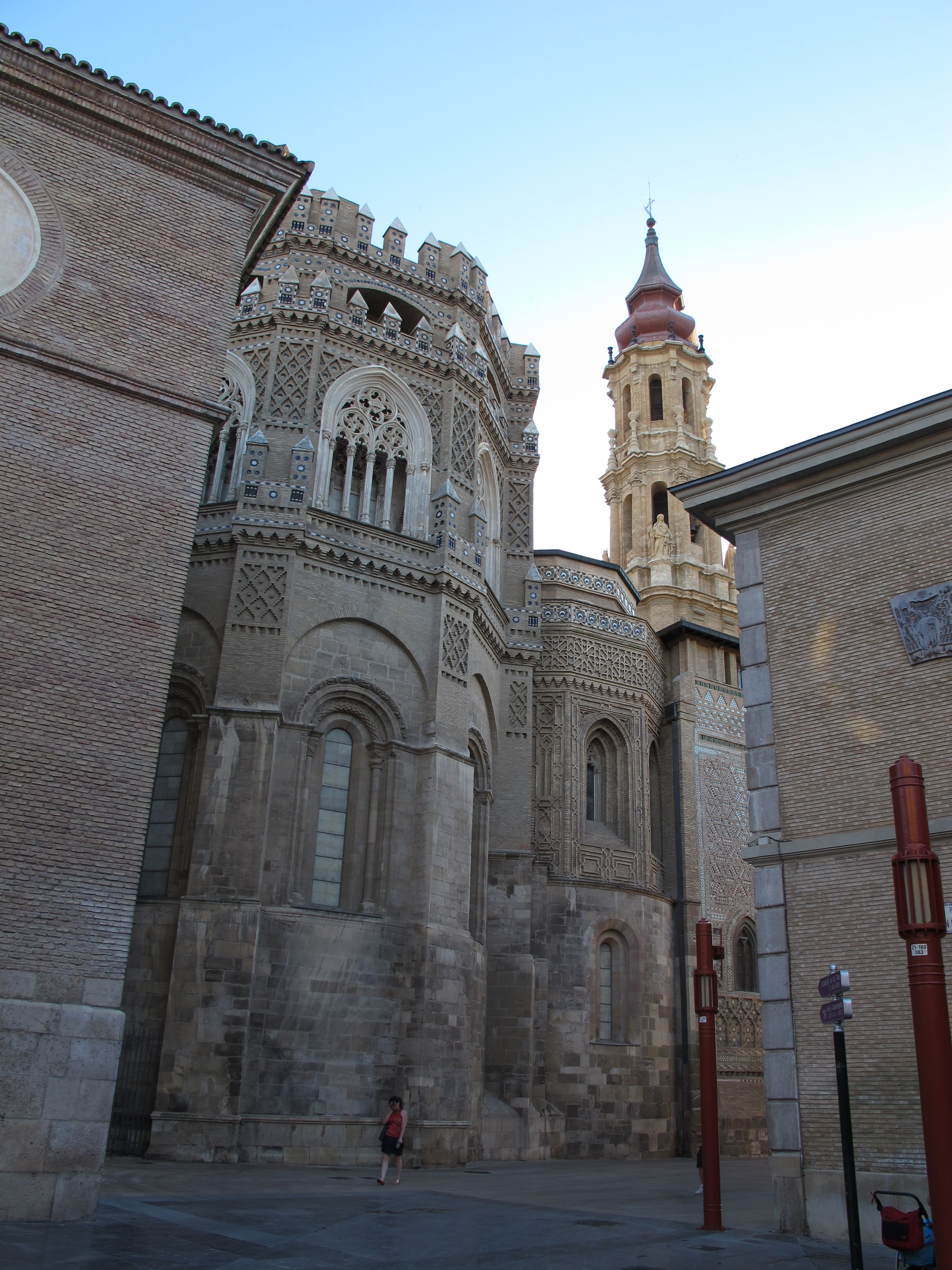
Frontal view of both apses

=== The Mosque ===
Hanas ben Abdallah as San'ani (? – 718), a disciple of someone close to Mohammed, built the main mosque of Saraqusta al Baida, Zaragoza la Blanca, according to Al-Ḥumaydī (1029–1095). The main mosque is certainly one of the oldest of Al-Andalus. The edifice underwent two additions, one in the 9th century and one in the 11th century, under the Taifa king of Zaragoza, Mundir I. During the restoration completed in 1999, a number of remains were discovered, such as the impression of the minaret on the external walls, and the floor of the ancient structure. In addition, the entrance was located in the same place as that of the current cathedral.

The arrival in Zaragoza in 1118 of Alfonso I, the Battler did not lead to the immediate demolition of the mosque. He gave the Muslims one year to move out of the town, and on October 4, 1121, the building was consecrated under the name San Salvador, and the necessary renovations were made to allow the building to be used for Christian purposes.

=== The Romanesque Cathedral ===
The destruction of the mosque and the construction of the Late Romanesque cathedral began in 1140. The new church, with a basilical layout consisting of a transept and three naves ending in apses, constructed of stone, owed much stylistically to the Cathedral of Jaca, from which it took various elements. Besides the church building itself, it had an archive, a refectory, a nursery, and two cloisters. From this era the lower part of two of the apses is still preserved, with small windows between inscribed capitals depicted, adorned with so-called "checkered jaqués" on the outside, and, inside, a set of sculptures that at present are hidden behind the main altarpiece. The construction of the original cathedral continued throughout the 13th century.

From 1204 up until the 15th century, all Aragonese kings were crowned in this church, by a special privilege bestowed by Pope Innocent III. The king, who the previous night had kept watch over his armaments in the Aljafería, would approach from there in a procession. The ceremony included four parts: investiture of weapons, unction with holy oil, placing of the crown and the royal insignia, and oath of the fueros (statutes) and liberties of the Kingdom of Aragon. The last king to be crowned in La Seo was Charles I in 1518. Later kings needed only to swear to the fueros. Royal baptisms, weddings, and burials were also performed in the cathedral.

=== The Gothic-Mudéjar Cathedral ===
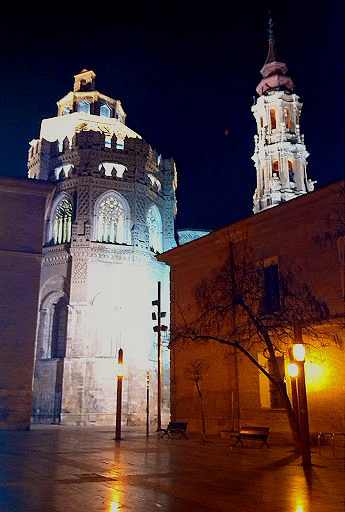
La Seo, night.

In 1318 Pope John XXII created the archbishopric of Zaragoza, making it independent of the see of Tarragona, and with that the building became a metropolitan cathedral. From this point the additions were carried out using cheap materials that were found nearby in abundance: bricks and plaster. Under the supervision of the archbishop Pedro López de Luna (1317–1345) a Gothic church with three naves (the present three central naves) was built, keeping the Romanesque apses. The central nave was built higher than those on the sides, making it possible to create windows that from 1447 would be covered with stained glass. In 1346, a Mudéjar dome was started to provide light at the altar, with the participation of the masters Juan de Barbastro and Domingo Serrano. The work was finished in 1376, when Don Lope Fernández de Luna was already archbishop, creating a spacious, well-lit Gothic cathedral.

In 1360, during the archbishopric of Don Lope Fernández de Luna, the main facade was renovated and the so-called Parroquieta was built, all in the Mudéjar style. The only thing that has been preserved is the Parroquieta or parochial chapel of San Miguel Archangel, that was built as a closed and independent chapel inside the building, and that archbishop Don Lope designed as a funeral chapel. The construction, elegantly carried out in Gothic-Mudéjar style, is a unique example of the work of the Aragonese masters and the Seville builders, who covered the exterior wall with geometric drawings made of smooth brick and glazed ceramic. In the interior, the roof is constructed of gilded wood in the Mudéjar style.

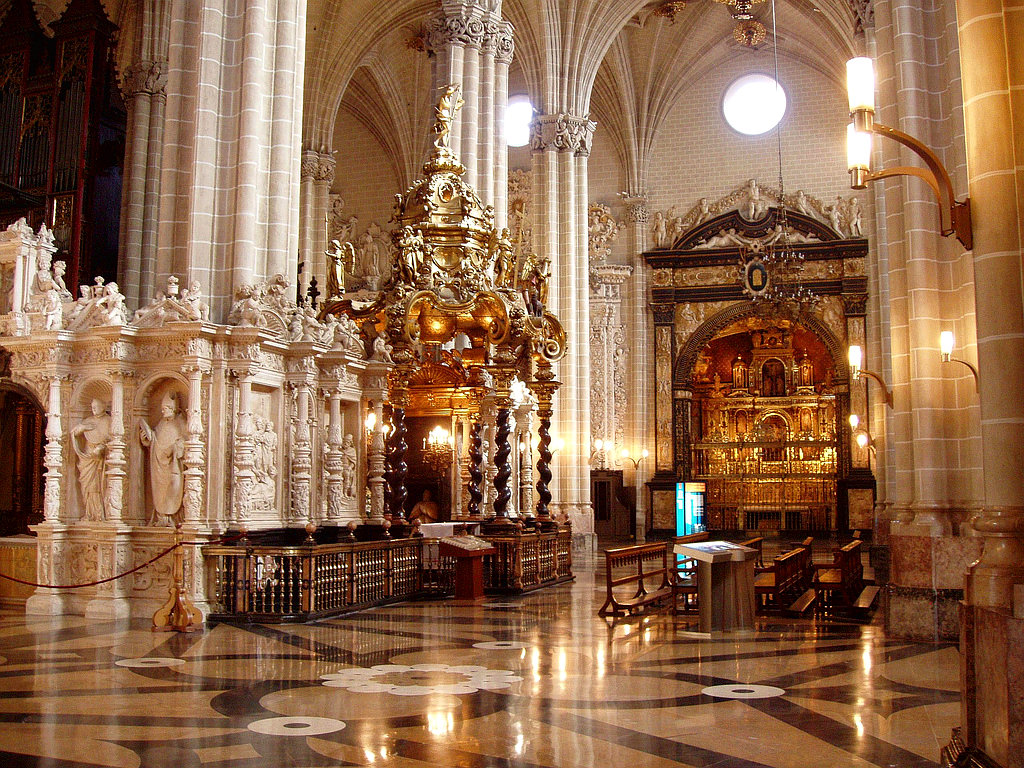
Right transept, with the 16th-century chapel of Gabriel Zaporta

=== Renaissance ===
In 1403 the old dome fell down. The Antipope Benedict XIII (Papa Luna), Aragonese by birth, initiated a reconstruction of the building. The Romanesque apses were elevated, two towers buttressing the sides of the apses were added, and a new dome was built in the shape of a Papal Tiara. Decorated in 1409 by the master Mohammed Rami, it may have been viewed by Benedict XIII on his visit to the city in 1410.

The main altarpiece was constructed during the archbishopric of Don Dalmau de Mur y Cervelló (1431–1456). Dalmau Mur concentrated on beautifying the interior of the building, taking charge of, besides the main altarpiece, the chorus and other smaller constructions.

On September 14, 1485, Pedro de Arbués, the canon and head Inquisitor of Aragón, was assassinated in the cathedral as he was praying while wearing a helmet and chain mail. This was the consequence of the bad reception that the Inquisition had in Aragón, where it was seen as an attack by the crown on the fueros, the local laws and privileges. In particular, some of the most powerful families among the converted Jews - such as the Sánchez, Montesa, Paternoy, and Santángel families - were implicated in the assassination. As a consequence, there arose a popular movement against the Jews; "nine were finally executed in persona, in addition to two suicides, thirteen burnings at the stake, and four punished for complicity" according to the account of Jerónimo Zurita. Pedro de Arbués was sainted by Pope Pius IX in 1867; his sepulchre, designed by Gil Morlanes the elder, is found within the cathedral in the chapel of San Pedro Arbués.

During the 16th and 17th century, the cathedral was one of the centers of the Aragonese school of polyphonic music. Musicians Melchor Robledo, Sebastián Aguilera de Heredia, Pedro Ruimonte, Diego Pontac, Jusépe Ximénez and Andrés de Sola, among others, worked and composed there.

=== Recent centuries ===
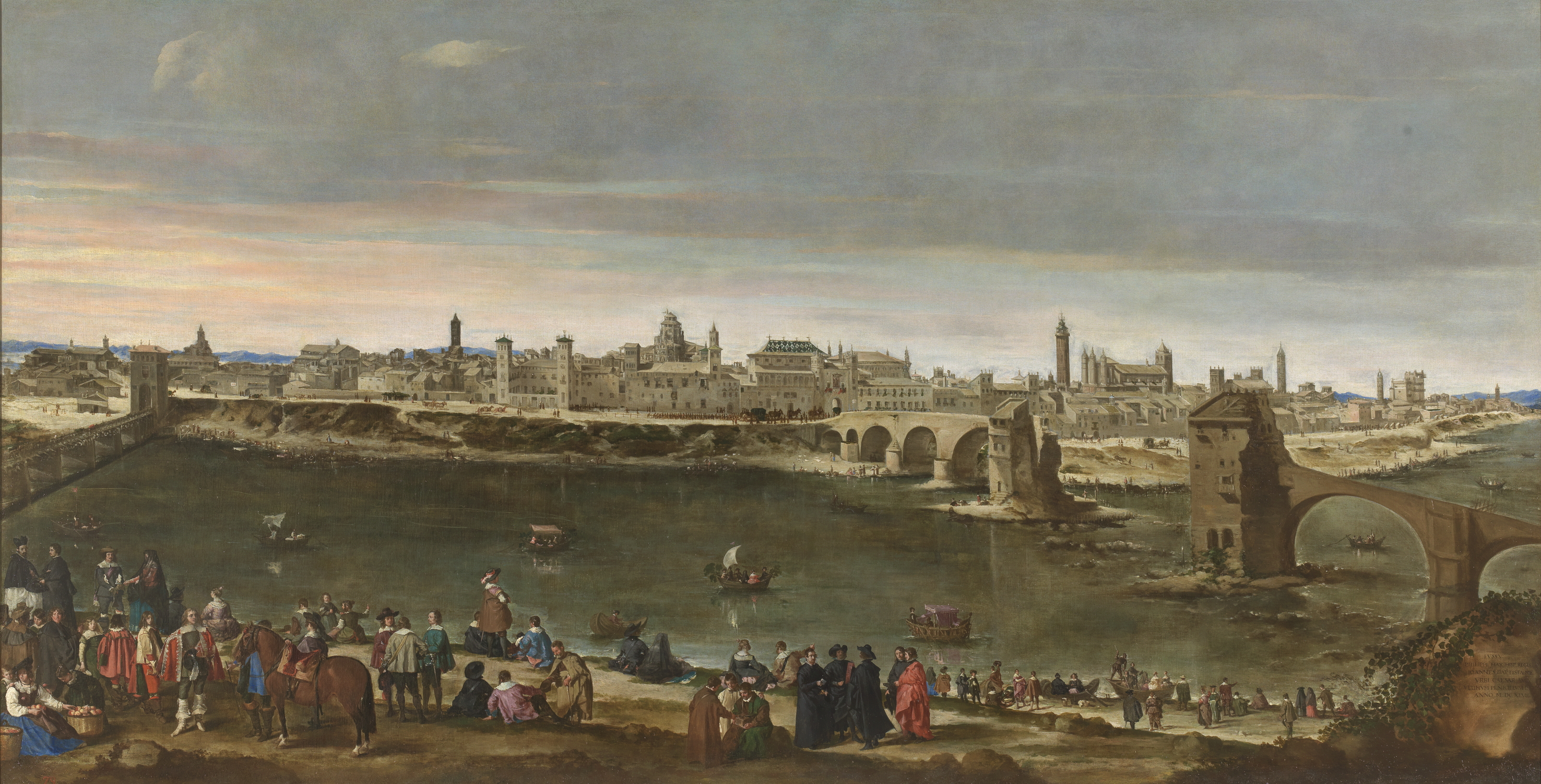
View of Zaragoza in 1647, painted by Juan Bautista Martínez del Mazo, though it is sometimes attributed to his master Diego Velázquez. The dome of the cathedral can be seen in the center, to the left of the bridge and the market.

The long-standing rivalry between the canons of El Pilar and of La Seo was well known in the 17th century. The cathedral chapter of El Pilar even brought a suit to win the episcopal seat, a suit that was decided by Philip IV in favor of La Seo. The disputes would not be resolved until, in 1676, Pope Clement X made the Solomon-like decision to merge the two chapters via the Bull of Union. 6 prebendaries and 15 canons would reside in La Seo, and the same in El Pilar, and the dean would live 6 months in each one.

Also during the 17th century, the old and decrepit Mudéjar tower was pulled down, and in 1686 construction was begun on a new one. The new tower, which was designed in Rome in 1683 by Juan Bautista Contini in the Baroque style, was started in 1686 and finished in 1704 with the placement of the spire.

The front was constructed in the 18th century in an Italian-Baroque style that was clearly of a neoclassic aspect. It was entrusted by the Archbishop Añoa to Julian Yarza, a disciple of Ventura Rodríguez.

During the second half of the 20th century, a thorough restoration of the building took place, which lasted some 23 years. The project can be divided into four stages:

- From 1975 to 1987: replacement of the six pillars of the main nave, roofs, eaves, glassworks, foundation, destruction of adjacent buildings, and archeological excavation.
- From 1987 to 1992: wall of the Parroquieta, dome, chapels of the head and neoclassical facade.
- From 1992 to 1994: completion of outside work and excavation of Roman and Muslim remnants.
- From 1995 to 1998: restoration of the tower, the spire and the clock, the organ, the main altarpiece; in general all the plasterwork and chapels were cleaned and restored; also the tapestry museum was renovated.

In total more than two billion pesetas were spent by the Government of Aragon, the Archbishopric of Zaragoza and the Metropolitan Chapter, the Department of Education and Culture of Spain, Ibercaja, and Caja de Ahorros de la Inmaculada. As of 2005, the sacristy was still in the process of restoration.

== Architectural styles ==
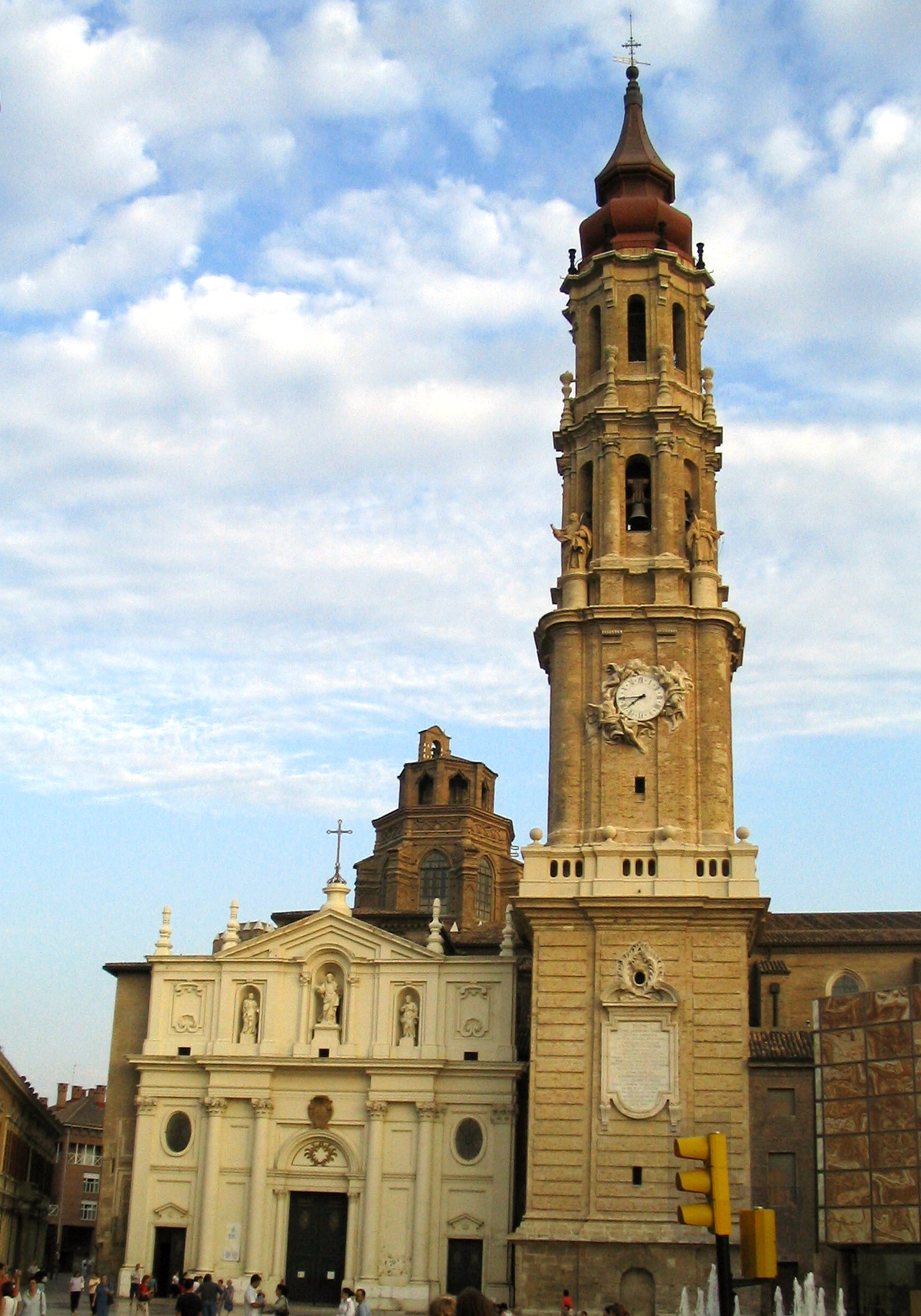
Facade, dome and bell tower

La Seo was built on the site of the ancient Roman forum of Augustus and of the main mosque of the Moorish city of Saraqusta, elements of whose minaret form part of the current tower. The construction began in the 12th century in the Romanesque style, and underwent many alterations and expansions until 1704, when the Baroque spire completed the tower.

The cathedral is a mixture of styles, from the Romanesque apse (12th century) to the Baroque tower and Neo-Classical main door (18th century), passing through Mudéjar and Gothic. Of the diverse styles that make up La Seo Cathedral, the most important elements are:

- Romanesque: in the exterior and the lower part of the apse. The Roman interior of the apse still remains, but is now covered by the Gothic altarpiece. In the sacristy are the "olifante" by Gaston IV of Béarn, built in ivory in the 11th century, and the relic-busts of Valerius of Saragossa (patron saint of Zaragoza), Saint Vincent of Saragossa, and St. Lawrence donated by the antipope Benedict XIII.
- Gothic: mixed with Mudéjar, especially in the upper part of the exterior of the apse. The three central naves with their arches and tracery. Magnificent altarpiece largely of painted alabaster made by Pere Johan and Hans de Suabia. Choir stalls. Museum of Flemish tapestries from the 15th, 16th and 17th centuries, one of the three largest such collections in the world.
- Mudéjar: exterior wall of the Parish of San Miguel and its interior roof, gilded with wood. The Aragonese Mudéjar has been named a World Heritage Site.
- Renaissance: In the Parroquieta of San Miguel, the tomb of the archbishop Don López Fernández de Luna from the 16th century. Dome with Mudéjar influences, built in the first third of the 16th century to replace the older Moorish dome.
- Baroque: Tower and gate.

The cathedral's museum has been restored recently and is open to the public. It is a tapestry museum that displays one of the finest collections of tapestries in the world.

== Interior ==
Beginning with the foot of the cathedral, the chapels on the right side:

- Door of the Pabostría and atrium. The interior of the door is the most interesting part.
- Chapel of Our Lady of the Snows, a late Gothic chapel with Baroque altar and altar paintings by Francisco Ximeno.
- Chapel of San Valero (Valerius). Baroque entryway of gilded wood from the seventeenth century with scenes of the saints Valerius (patron of the city), Vincent, and Lawrence. Walls were painted by García Ferrer.
- Chapel of Saint Helen, or the Chapel of the Most Holy Sacrament. The altar, entryway, and paintings by Francesco Lupicini of Florence are all Baroque works of the seventeenth century.
- Chapel of the archangels Michael, Gabriel, and Raphael. The chapel was constructed by Gabriel Zaporta towards the end of the sixteenth century as a funerary chapel; only the lid of the sarcophagus has been preserved from that era. Dating from the Renaissance are altar decorations fashioned by Juan de Anchieta, bronze grating by Guillén Trujarón, and the doorway. The paintings and mosaics are believed to be the work of the painter Pedro Morone of Siena.
- Chapel of Santo Dominguito de Val, patron saint of the Infanticos. This Baroque chapel dates back to the second half of the eighteenth century and houses the remains of the saint himself. Elliptical cupola (dome) that arches over very detailed plaster pechinas (support structures of the cupola).
- Chapel of St. Augustine. Renaissance-era altar decorations by Gil Morlanes with sculptures by Gabriel Yoly and José Sanz (image of St. Augustine from 1720)
- Chapel of Saint Pedro Arbués. On the walls appear framed paintings from the seventeenth century attributed to the artist Berdusán. Below a canopy (pavilion-like draping of fabric) with Solomonic columns is a sculpture of Saint Pedro Arbués done by Juan Ramírez in the seventeenth century. Baroque doorway from the eighteenth century.

Beginning with the foot of the cathedral, the chapels on the left side:

- Chapel of St. Bernard. This is one of the greatest works of the Aragonese Renaissance. Between 1549 and 1555, it contained the tombs of the archbishop Hernando de Aragón, who ordered its construction, along with that of his mother Ana de Gurrea. Juan Vizcaíno created the sepulchre of the archbishop, and Juan de Liceire did that of his mother. The altar decorations for the Chapel of San Bruno were entrusted to the sculptor Pedro de Moreto. All parts were made of alabaster. The grating is also from the Renaissance and was the work of Guillén Trujarón.
- Chapel of St. Benedict. Commissioned in Gothic style in the sixteenth century, the construction was delayed by Hernando de Aragón in order to collect the bodies of his servants.
- Chapel of St. Mark.
- Chapel of the Birth of Christ. Simple doorway from the sixteenth century. Altar decorations with panels attributed to Roland de Mois or Jerónimo de Mora from the sixteenth century. Renaissance grating by Hernando de Ávila.
- Chapel of Saints Justa and Rufina. Paintings by Juan Galván hang over the walls. The painting of the saints was done by Francisco Camilo in 1644.
- Chapel of St. Vincent. Baroque doorway. The sculpture of St. Vincent is from roughly 1760 and was created by Carlos Salas.
- Chapel of St. James the Great (Santiago). A painting by Pablo Raviella from 1695. An image of St. James the pilgrim, from the 16th century, under a baroque canopy.

Choir:

- The choir section is formed by 117 oaken seats built by three monks named Gomar, Bernardo Giner, and Mateo de Cambiay. It is enclosed by a bronze grating accented with sculptures of gilded wood by Juan Ramírez. The archbishop Dalmau Mir is buried here.
- The organ preserves some remnants of the Gothic organ of 1469 and pipes hailing from the fifteenth to the eighteenth century. The present-day organ is the result of the integration of the complex historical pieces of the instrument, done between 1857 and 1859 by Pedro Roqués.
- To the rear of the choir lies the chapel of the Holy Christ, with a representation of the crucified Christ, Mater Dolorosa (Mary) and St. John created by Arnau de Bruselas near the end of the sixteenth century; all of this is below a canopy supported by Solomonic columns of black marble. The decorations are the work of Jerónimo Vallejo, Arnau de Bruselas, and Juan Sanz de Tudelilla, done in hardened plaster, and they form one of the most notable groups of sculpture from the Aragonese Renaissance. To the sides lie the small chapels of St. Martha, St. Matthew, St. John the Baptist, St. Thomas of Villanova, Nuestra Señora de la Merced, Saint Leonard of Noblac, Saint Philip Neri, and Saint Orosia.

Apses:

- Chapel of the Virgen Blanca (White Virgin). Baroque altar decorations of wood with paintings by Jusepe Martínez (1647), a painter from Zaragoza. Alabaster sculpture of the Virgin with child from the fifteenth century made by the French sculptor Fortaner de Uesques. On the floor lie various tombstones of the archbishops of Zaragoza from the sixteenth and seventeenth centuries.
- Main altar decorations. Dedicated to the Savior, it was originally created in alabaster and painted by various artists from 1434 to 1480, most notably Pere Johan, Francisco Gomar, and Hans Piet D'anso. It can be considered one of the greatest works of European Gothic sculpture.
- Chapel of St. Peter and St. Paul. Altar decorations of gilded wood with relief scenes of the lives of Saints Peter and Paul.

== See also ==
- Catholic Church in Spain
- Aljafería
- High medieval domes
- 16th-century Western domes
