= Jaime de Montesa =

Spanish jurist

Jaime de Montesa (†August 20, 1487), was a Spanish jurist and the highest authority of Zaragoza until 1485.

== Protest against the inquisition ==
A Jewish convert to Christianity, along with other influential conversos, including knights and other royal officials, he protested to King Ferdinand the Catholic against the growing influence and power of the Holy Office of the Inquisition in the city of Zaragoza, in a request that pointed out the discomfort caused by the presence of this institution in that kingdom. He argumented that because the kingdom was very Christian and there were very few heretics, anyone found suspicious should only be approached through warnings and advice. His protests did not obtain any result, the king's reply being limited: Being the kingdom of Aragon very Christian, the court should not cause any discomfort, since there was no reason for it to have the opportunity to repeatedly enter its functions.

== Prosecution ==
On October 17, 1485, a month after the assassination of the inquisitor Pedro Arbués, Jaime de Montesa was accused of having been one of the conspirators by a man who frequented a maid in his residence, and he was arrested, being disqualified from the exercise of office. The court of the Inquisition questioned him two days later, and although he denied any guilt related to the act, he was confined in a prison cell where he remained for 22 months, awaiting trial.

He was interrogated for the second time on August 10, 1487, on which occasion he was subjected to the system of torture known as garrucha. Because of this he confessed, perhaps falsely, to having participated in instigating and planning the inquisitor's murder, and to having offered 600 gold florins to whoever murdered him.

He was tried and convicted on charges that had nothing to do with the reason for which he was imprisoned, these being those of following the Mosaic Law, attending Jewish weddings, eating their own food, being a Judaizer and having practiced Jewish ceremonies after converting to Christianity.

== Sentence ==
Found guilty of the charges that were imputed to him, he was sentenced to death for the lateness of his confession.

Jaime de Montesa, as a septuagenarian, was beheaded in Zaragoza's Market Square on August 20, 1487, the same day that his daughter, Leonor de Montesa, was burned in one of the stakes of this square for having performed Jewish ceremonies and for having fasted for fifty years on the Jewish holiday of Yom Kippur.
