= Expulsions and exoduses of Jews =

List and timeline of mass departure of Jews, forced or otherwise

This article lists expulsions, refugee crises and other forms of displacement that have affected Jews.

== Timeline ==
The following is a list of Jewish expulsions and events that prompted significant streams of Jewish refugees.

=== Assyrian captivity ===
733/2 BCE
Tiglath-Pileser III, King of the Neo-Assyrian Empire, sacked the northern Kingdom of Israel and annexed the territory of the tribes of Reuben, Gad and Manasseh in Gilead. People from these tribes were taken captive and resettled in the region of the Khabur River, in Halah, Habor, Hara and Gozan (1 Chronicles 5:26). Tiglath-Pileser also captured the territory of Naphtali and the city of Janoah in Ephraim, and an Assyrian governor was placed over the region of Naphtali. According to 2 Kings 15:29, the population of Naphtali was deported to Assyria.

722 BCE
In 722 BCE, Samaria, the capital city of the northern Kingdom of Israel, was taken by Sargon II, who resettled the Israelites in Halah, Habor, Gozan and in the cities of Media (2 Kings 18:11–12). Sargon recorded the capture of that city thus: "Samaria I looked at, I captured; 27,280 men who dwelt in it I carried away" into Assyria. Some people of the northern tribes were spared, and it has been suggested that many also fled south to Jerusalem.

Contemporary scholarship confirms that deportations occurred both before and after the Assyrian conquest of the Kingdom of Israel in 722–720 BCE, with varying impacts across Galilee, Transjordan, and Samaria. During the earlier Assyrian invasions, Galilee and Transjordan experienced significant deportations, with entire tribes vanishing. In contrast, archaeological findings from Samaria suggest a more mixed picture. While some sites were destroyed or abandoned during the Assyrian invasion, major cities such as Samaria and Megiddo remained largely intact, and other sites show a continuity of occupation. Based on changes in material culture, Adam Zertal estimated that only 10% of the Israelite population in Samaria was deported, indicating that most Israelites continued to reside in Samaria.

Archaeologist Eric Cline believes only 10–20% of Samaria’s Israelite population (i.e. 40,000 Israelites) were deported to Assyria in 720 BCE. About 80,000 Israelites fled to Judah whilst between 100,000 and 230,000 Israelites remained in Samaria. The latter intermarried with the foreign settlers, thus forming the Samaritans.

=== Babylonian captivity ===
597 BCE
In 598 BCE, Nebuchadnezzar II of the Neo-Babylonian Empire besieged Jerusalem, then capital of the southern Kingdom of Judah. The city fell after a three-month siege, and the new king Jeconiah, who was either 8 or 18, his court and other prominent citizens (including the prophet Ezekiel) and craftsmen, were deported to Babylon. Jehoiakim's uncle Zedekiah was appointed king in his place.

587/6 BCE
When Zedekiah revolted against Babylonian rule, Nebuchadnezzar responded by invading Judah (2 Kings 25:1). In December 589 BCE, Nebuchadnezzar began another siege of Jerusalem. During the siege, many Jews fled to surrounding Moab, Ammon, Edom and other countries to seek refuge. The city eventually fell after a thirty-month siege, and the Babylonian general Nebuzaradan was sent to complete its destruction. The city was plundered, and Solomon's Temple was destroyed. Most of the members of the elite class were taken into captivity in Babylon. The city was razed. Only a few people were permitted to remain and tend to the land (Jeremiah 52:16). In 537 BCE Cyrus the Great, the founding king of the Achaemenid Persian Empire, allowed the Jews to return to Judah and rebuild the Temple.

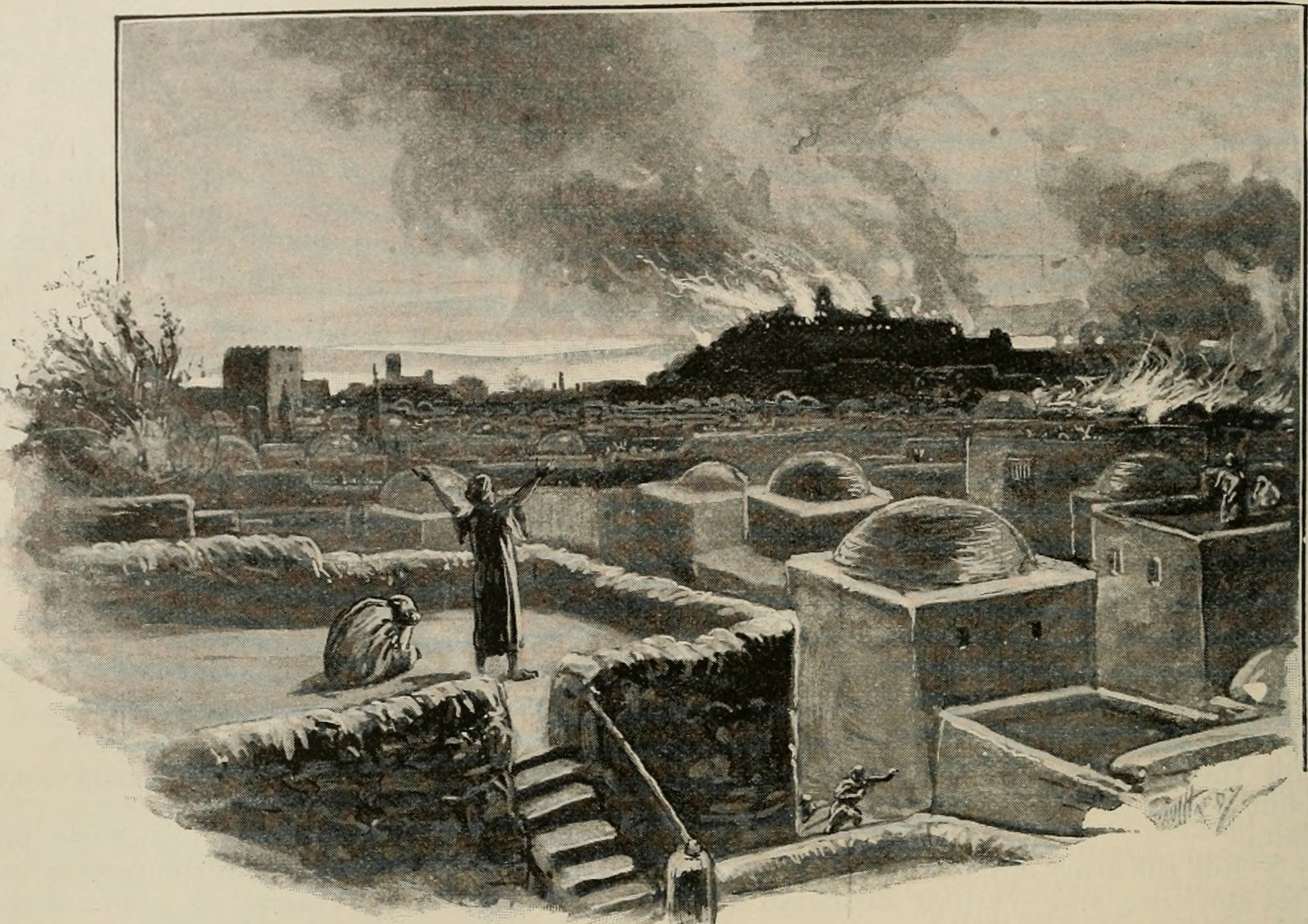
Fall of Jerusalem; Solomon's Temple is on fire

=== 500–1 BCE ===
139 BCE
Expulsion from the city of Rome under the accusation of aggressive proselytizing among the Romans.

=== 1–599 CE ===
19 CE
Expulsion from the city of Rome by Emperor Tiberius together with practitioners of the Egyptian religion.

38 CE
Jews were expelled from one of their quarters in the city of Alexandria, in Egypt, under the instigation of Aulus Avilius Flaccus.

41–53 CE
Claudius' expulsion of Jews from Rome.

73 CE
The Jewish defeat in the First Jewish–Roman War (66–73 CE) resulted in significant loss of life from battle, famine, and disease, extensive city destruction—including Jerusalem—and widespread forced displacement. Many Jews were enslaved or sent into forced labor in locations such as Egypt and the Isthmus of Corinth, while others were dispersed across the Roman Empire. Young men were coerced into gladiatoral combat, and others were sold into brothels or slavery. As a result, a substantial portion of the Jewish population of Judaea was either expelled or displaced.

117
The suppression of the Diaspora Revolt (115–117) involved a devastating campaign of ethnic cleansing that resulted in the near-total annihilation and expulsion of Jews from Cyrenaica, Cyprus, and large portions of Egypt.

135
The Bar Kokhba revolt (132–136 CE) had catastrophic effects on the Jewish population in Judaea, resulting in massive loss of life, extensive forced displacements, and widespread enslavement, which left central Judea in a state of desolation. Some scholars describe the Roman suppression of the revolt as constituting an act of genocide. Following the revolt, Jews were expelled from the vicinity of Jerusalem and the districts of Gophna, Herodion, and Aqraba. The revolt triggered a significant migration of Jews from Judea to coastal cities and Galilee. Jewish captives were sold into slavery and dispersed across various parts of the empire, causing a significant influx of new slaves into the market.

415
After a massacre of Christians by some Jews, Jews were expelled from Alexandria under the leadership of Saint Cyril of Alexandria. Sources differ over whether all Alexandrian Jews were expelled or just the ones involved in the massacre.

418
Jews expelled from Minorca or asked to convert.

=== Sixth to tenth centuries ===
612
Visigothic king Sisebut mandated that every Jew who would refuse for over a year to have himself or his children and servants baptized would be banished from the country and deprived of his possessions.

629
The entire Jewish population of Galilee massacred or expelled, following the Jewish rebellion against Byzantium.

7th century
Muhammad expelled two Jewish tribes: the Banu Qaynuqa and Banu Nadir from Medina. The Banu Qurayza tribe was slaughtered and the Jewish settlement of Khaybar was ransacked.

=== Eleventh to thirteenth centuries ===
1012
Jews expelled from Mainz.

Expulsions of Jews in Europe from 1100 to 1600

1095–mid-13th century
The waves of Crusades destroyed many Jewish communities in Europe (most notably in Rhineland) and in the Middle East (most notably in Jerusalem).

Mid-12th century
The invasion of Almohades brought to an end the Golden age of Jewish culture in Spain. Among other refugees was Maimonides, who fled to Morocco, then Egypt, then Palestine.

12th–14th centuries
France. The practice of expelling the Jews accompanied by confiscation of their property, followed by temporary readmissions for ransom, was used to enrich the crown: expulsions from Paris by Philip Augustus in 1182, from France by Louis IX in 1254, by Philip IV in 1306, by Charles IV in 1322, by Charles V in 1359, by Charles VI in 1394.

13th century
The influential philosopher and logician Ramon Llull (1232–1315) called for expulsion of all Jews who would refuse conversion to Christianity. Some scholars regard Llull's as the first comprehensive articulation, in the Christian West, of an expulsionist policy regarding Jews.

1231
Simon de Montfort expels the Jews of Leicester.

1253
On July 23 (Menachem Av 25) the Jews of Vienne, France were expelled by order of Pope Innocent III.

1275
King Edward I of England permits his mother Eleanor of Provence to expel Jews from her dowager lands, including Cambridge, Gloucester, Marlborough, and Worcester.

1276
Jews expelled from Upper Bavaria.

1287
Edward I of England expels Jews from Gascony.

1288
Naples issues first expulsion of Jews in southern Italy.

1289
Charles of Salerno expels Jews from Maine and Anjou.

1290
King Edward I of England issues the Edict of Expulsion for all Jews from England. After 365 years, the policy was reversed in 1655 by Oliver Cromwell.

1294
On June 24 (4th of Tamuz), the Jews of Berne, Switzerland were expelled. "Several Jews were put to death there in consequence of a blood libel", but a deal involving the Jews paying money reverted the expulsion.

=== 14th century ===
1360
Jews expelled from Hungary by Louis I of Hungary.

1392
Jews expelled from Bern, Switzerland. Although between 1408 and 1427 Jews were again residing in the city, the only Jews to appear in Bern subsequently were transients, chiefly physicians and cattle dealers.

=== 15th century ===
1420–1421
Duke Albert V orders the imprisonment and forcible conversion to Christianity of all Jews in Austria. Some convert and others leave the country. In 1421 Austrian authorities again arrest and expel Jews and Jews are banned from the capital Vienna.

1442
Jews again expelled from Upper Bavaria.

1478
Jews expelled from Passau.

1491
Jews of Ravenna expelled, synagogues destroyed.

1492
Ferdinand II and Isabella I issued the Alhambra decree, General Edict on the Expulsion of the Jews from Castile and Aragon (approx. 200,000) and from Sicily (1493, approx. 37,000).

1495
Charles VIII of France occupies Kingdom of Naples, bringing new persecution against Jews, many of whom were refugees from Spain.

1496
Jews expelled from Portugal. Maximilian I, Holy Roman Emperor, issues a decree expelling all Jews from Styria and Wiener Neustadt.

1498
Jews expelled from Navarre.

1499
Jews expelled from Nuremberg.

=== 16th century ===
1510
Jews expelled from Naples.

1515
Jews expelled from Dubrovnik. Exceptions are made for physicians and for short stays of merchants.

1519
Jews expelled from Regensburg.

1526
Jews expelled from Pressburg (Bratislava) in the wake of the defeat of the Kingdom of Hungary by the Ottoman Empire.

1551
All remaining Jews expelled from the duchy of Bavaria. Jewish settlement in Bavaria ceased until toward the end of the 17th century, when a small community was founded in Sulzbach by refugees from Vienna.

1569
Pope Pius V expels Jews from the papal states, except for Ancona and Rome.

1593
Pope Clement VIII expels Jews living in all the papal states, except Rome, Avignon and Ancona. Jews are invited to settle in Leghorn, the main port of Tuscany, where they are granted full religious liberty and civil rights, by the Medici family, who want to develop the region into a center of commerce.

1597
Nine hundred Jews expelled from Milan.

=== 17th century ===
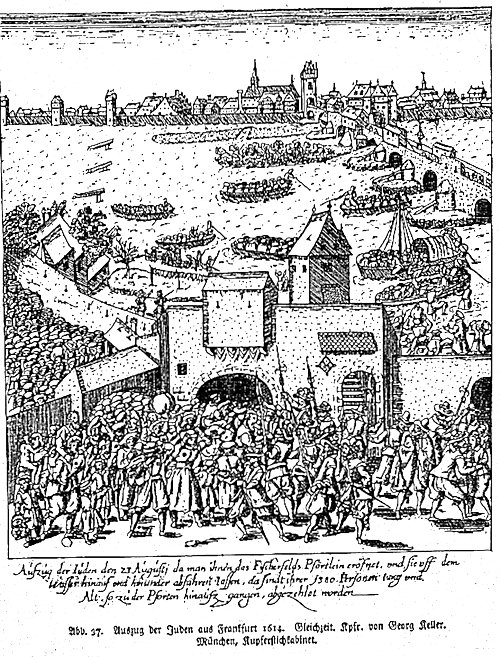
Expulsion of Jews from Frankfurt in 1614

1614
Fettmilch Uprising: Jews are expelled from Frankfurt, Holy Roman Empire, following the plundering of the Judengasse.

1654
The fall of the Dutch colony of Recife in Brazil to the Portuguese prompted the Jewish arrival in New Amsterdam, the first group of Jews to flee to North America.

1669–1670
Jews expelled from Vienna by Leopold I, Holy Roman Emperor and subsequently forbidden to settle in the Austrian Hereditary Lands. The former Jewish ghetto on the Unterer Werd was renamed Leopoldstadt in honour of the emperor and the expropriated houses and land given to Catholic citizens.

1679–1680
Jews throughout Yemen expelled from their towns and villages and sent to a desert place, in what is known as the Mawza Exile.

1685
Jews expelled from the French Colonial Empire's Caribbean territories by Louis XIV's decree in the Code Noir.

=== 18th century ===
1701–1714
War of the Spanish Succession. After the war, Jews of Austrian origin were expelled from Bavaria, but some were able to acquire the right to reside in Munich.

1744–1790s
The reforms of Frederick II, Joseph II and Maria Theresa sent masses of impoverished German and Austrian Jews east. (Note: See also: Schutzjude)

1791
The tzarina of Russia Catherine the Great institutes the Pale of Settlement, restricting Jews to the western parts of the empire by means of deportation.

=== 19th century ===
1862 Tennessee, Mississippi, Kentucky
Jews expelled by Ulysses S. Grant by General Order No. 11.

1880–1910s
Pogroms in the Russian Empire: around 2.5 million Jews emigrated from eastern Europe, mostly to the United States.

=== 20th century ===
1917
Jews expelled from the area of Jaffa by Ottoman authorities during World War I.

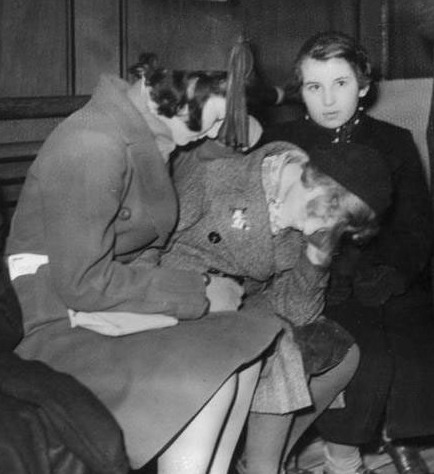
First batch of refugee children arrive in England from Germany

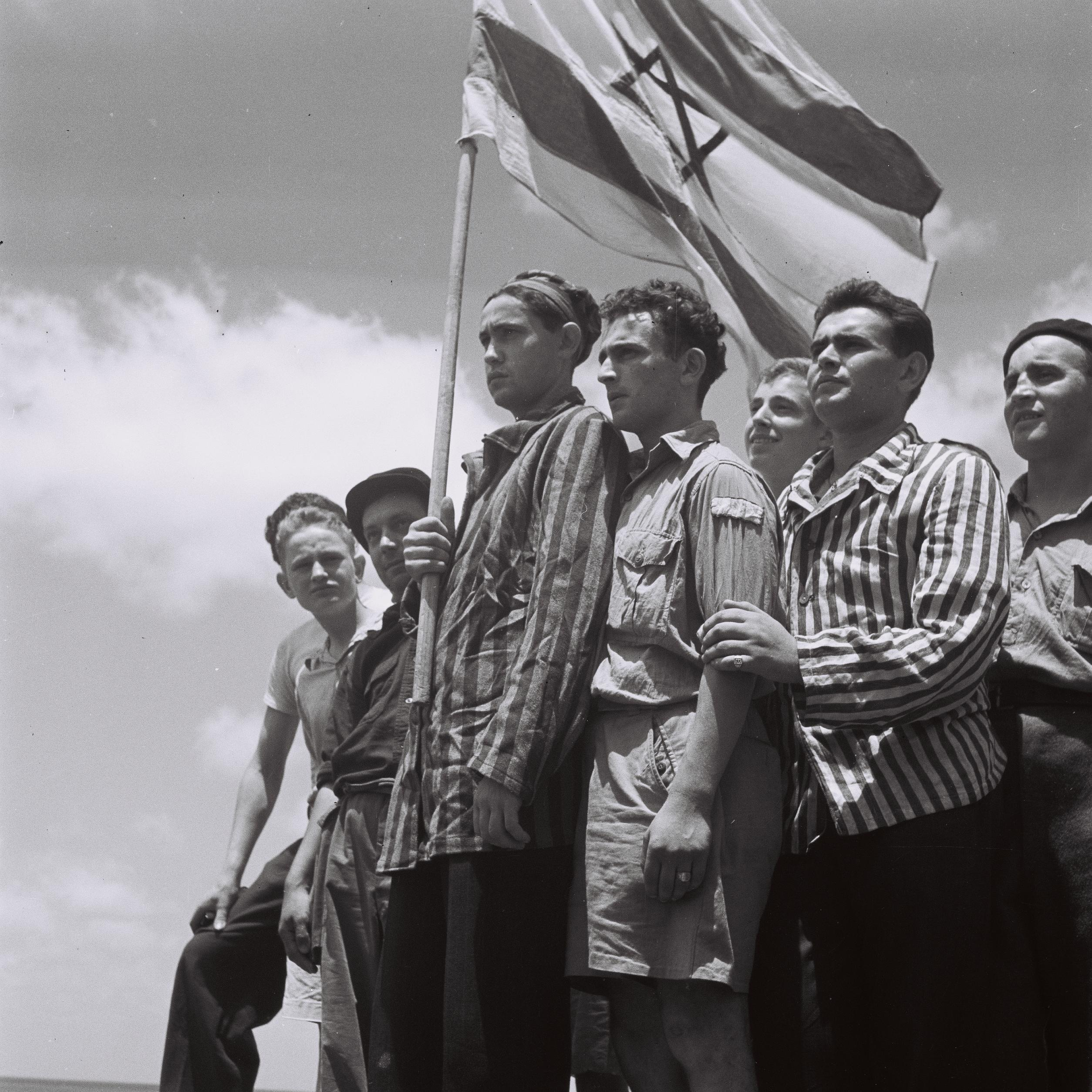
Buchenwald survivors arrive in Haifa

1933–1957
The Nazi German persecution started with the Nazi boycott of Jewish businesses in 1933, reached a first climax during Kristallnacht in 1938 and culminated in the Holocaust of European Jewry. The 1938 Evian Conference, the 1943 Bermuda Conference and other attempts failed to resolve the problem of Jewish refugees, a fact widely used in Nazi propaganda. (Note: See also: MS St. Louis) A small number of German and Austrian Jewish refugees from Nazism emigrated to Britain, where attitudes were not necessarily positive. Many of the refugees fought for Britain in the Second World War. Already before the Holocaust, by February 1940, the expulsion of Poles by Nazi Germany from occupied western Poland also targeted some 20,000 Polish Jews. There was a special institution set up in 1939 to coordinate the expulsion, initially named the Special Staff for the Resettlement of Poles and Jews (Sonderstab für die Aussiedlung von Polen und Juden), soon renamed to Office for the Resettlement of Poles and Jews (Amt für Umsiedlung der Polen und Juden), and eventually to Central Bureau for Resettlement (Umwandererzentralstelle). After the war, central and eastern European Holocaust survivors migrated to the western Allied-controlled part of Europe, as the Jewish society to which most of them belonged did not exist anymore. Often they were lone survivors consumed by the often futile search for other family and friends, and often unwelcome in the towns from which they came. They were known as displaced persons (also known as Sh'erit ha-Pletah) and placed in displaced persons camps, most of which were by 1951 closed. The last camp Föhrenwald was closed in 1957.

1940
During World War II, the so-called June Deportation, carried out by the Soviet Union in June and July 1940, as the fourth of five waves of mass deportations of Polish citizens from Soviet-occupied eastern Poland, also targeted some 65,000 Polish Jews who fled from the German-occupied part of Poland. According to the NKVD, Polish Jews accounted for 85% of people deported in the June Deportation. The victims were deported to the Altai Krai, Chelyabinsk Oblast, Irkutsk Oblast, Krasnoyarsk Krai, Novosibirsk Oblast, Omsk Oblast, Sverdlovsk Oblast and Yakutia in Siberia, and Arkhangelsk Oblast, Komi, Mari, Nizhny Novgorod Oblast, Perm Oblast and Vologda Oblast in European Russia.

1943–1944
Jews are expelled, their citizenship is stripped from them and they are subjected to pogroms in some Italian cities, including Rome, Verona, Florence, Pisa and Alessandria.

1947–1972

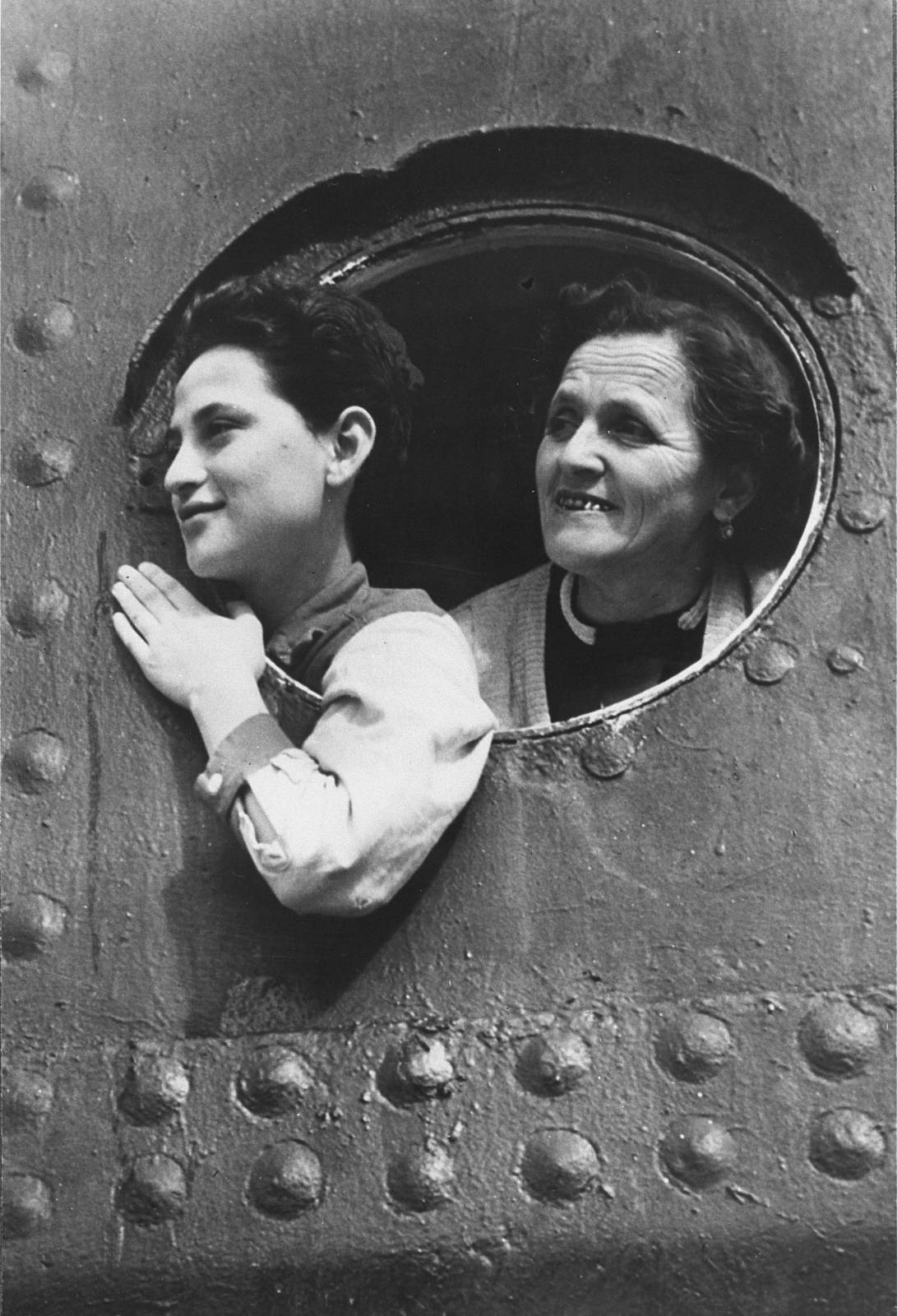
Jewish refugees look out through the portholes of a ship while it is docked in the port city of Haifa.

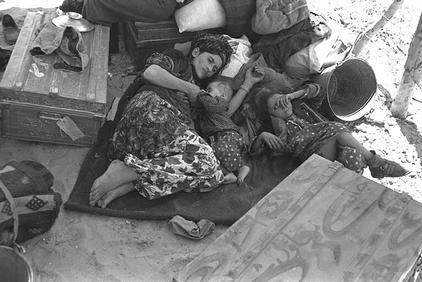
Iraqi Jews displaced 1951.

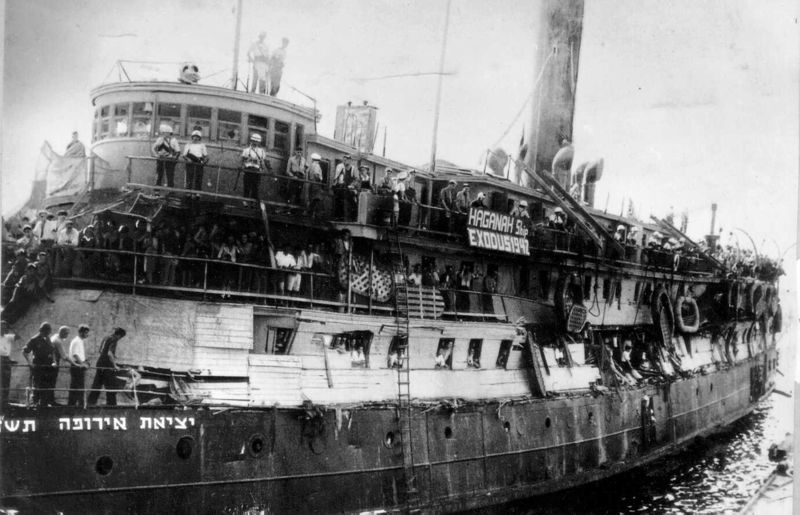
The Exodus bringing in refugees.

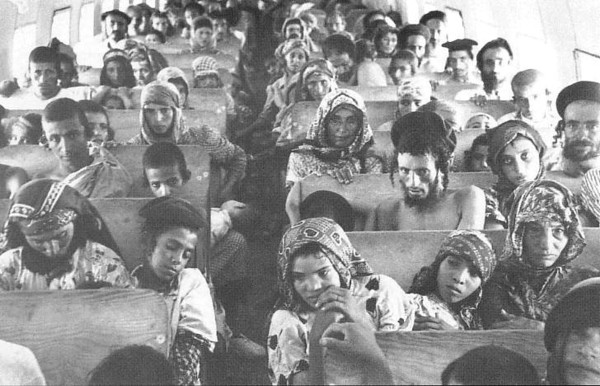
In the course of the operation "Magic Carpet" (1949–1950), most of the community of Yemenite Jews (called Teimanim, about 49,000) immigrated to Israel.

The Jewish exodus from the Muslim world, in which the combined population of the Jewish communities of the Middle East and North Africa (excluding Israel) was reduced from about 900,000 in 1948 to under 8,000 today, and approximately 600,000 of them became citizens of Israel. The history of the exodus is politicized, given its proposed relevance to a final settlement to the Israeli–Palestinian peace negotiations. When presenting the history, those who view the Jewish exodus as equivalent to the 1948 Palestinian expulsion and flight, such as the Israeli government and NGOs such as JJAC and JIMENA, emphasize "push factors", such as cases of anti-Jewish violence and forced expulsions, and refer to those affected as "refugees". Those who argue that the exodus does not equate to the Palestinian exodus emphasize "pull factors", such as the actions of local Jewish Agency for Israel officials aiming to fulfil the One Million Plan, highlight good relations between the Jewish communities and their country's governments, emphasize the impact of other push factors such as the decolonization in the Maghreb and the Suez War and Lavon Affair in Egypt, and argue that many or all of those who left were not refugees.

Then UNHCR announced in February 1957 and in July 1967, that these Jews who had fled from Arab countries "may be considered prima facie within the mandate of this office," so according them in international law, as bona fide refugees.

1947
Egypt passed the Companies' Law. This law required that no less than 75% of employees of companies in Egypt must be Egyptian citizens. This law strongly affected Jews, as only about 20% of all Jews in Egypt were Egyptian citizens. The rest, although in many cases born in Egypt and living there for generations, did not hold Egyptian citizenship.

1948
State of Israel established. Antisemitism in Egypt strongly intensified. On May 15, 1948, emergency law was declared, and a royal decree forbade Egyptian citizens to leave the country without a special permit. This was applied to Jews. Hundreds of Jews were arrested and many had their property confiscated. In June through August 1948, bombs were planted in Jewish neighborhoods and Jewish businesses looted. About 250 Jews were killed or wounded by the bombs. Roughly 14,000 Jews left Egypt between 1948 and 1950.

1949
Jordan occupies and then annexes the West Bank – largely allotted by the 1947 UN Partition of Palestine to an Arab state, proposal rejected by the Arab leadership – and conducts large scale discrimination and persecution of all non-Muslim residents – Jewish, Christian (of many denominations), Druze, Circassian, etc. – and forces Arabisation of all public activity, including schools and public administration.

1951–1952
During Operation Ezra and Nehemiah, ~120,000 Jews are expelled under the De-Naturalization Act of Iraqi PM Tawfeeq Al-Suwaidi.

1954
Gamal Abdel Nasser seizes power in Egypt. Nasser immediately arrested many Jews who were tried on various charges, mainly for Zionist and communist activities. Jews were forced to donate large sums of money to the military. Strict supervision of Jewish enterprises was introduced; some were confiscated and others forcibly sold to the government.

1956
Suez Crisis. Roughly 3,000 Egyptian Jews were interned without charge in four detention camps. The government ordered thousands of Jews to leave the country within a few days, and they were not allowed to sell their property, nor to take any capital with them. The deportees were made to sign statements agreeing not to return to Egypt and transferring their property to the administration of the government. The International Red Cross helped about 8,000 stateless Jews to leave the country, taking most of them to Italy and Greece. Most of the Jews of Port Said (about 100) were smuggled to Israel by Israel agents. The system of deportation continued into 1957. Other Jews left voluntarily, after their livelihoods had been taken from them, until only 8,561 were registered in the 1957 census. The Jewish exodus continued until there were about 3,000 Jews left as of in 1967.

1962
Jews flee Algeria as result of FLN violence. The community feared that the proclamation of independence would precipitate a Muslim outburst. By the end of July 1962, 70,000 Jews had left for France and another 5,000 for Israel. It is estimated that some 80% of Algerian Jews settled in France.

1965
Situation of Jews in Algeria rapidly deteriorates. By 1969, fewer than 1,000 Jews remain. By the 1990s, the numbers had dwindled to approximately 70.

1967
Six-Day War. Hundreds of Egyptian Jews arrested, suffering beatings, torture, and abuse. Some were released following intervention by foreign states, especially by Spain, and were permitted to leave the country. Libyan Jews, who numbered approximately 7,000, were subjected to pogroms in which 18 were killed, prompting a mass exodus that left fewer than 100 Jews in Libya.

1968
Thousands of Jews were forced to leave communist Poland because of "anti-Zionist" campaigns during the 1968 Polish political crisis.
1970
Less than 1,000 Jews still lived in Egypt in 1970. They were given permission to leave but without their possessions. As of 1971, only 400 Jews remained in Egypt. As of 2013, only a few dozen Jews remain in Egypt. As of 2019, there were five in Cairo. As of 2022 the total number of known Egyptian Jews permanently residing in Egypt is three.

1970–1986
State-sponsored persecution in the Soviet Union prompted hundreds of thousands of Soviet Jews, known as Refuseniks because they had been denied official permission to leave, to flee; most went to Israel or to the United States as refugees.
1972
Idi Amin expels all Israelis from Uganda.
1984–1985
10,000 Jews flee Ethiopia as part of Operation Moses and Operation Joshua.
1991
14,000 Jews flee Ethiopia as part of Operation Solomon.

=== 21st century ===
2003
Last Jew left Libya.
2005
The Israeli disengagement from the Gaza Strip forced relocation of 8,000 people from the Gaza Strip.
2010
Contact with last two Jews in Somalia was lost.
2021
Last Jews left Afghanistan.
2021
The Jewish population of Yemen decreases from 18 to six, and later to five by 2024.

== Expulsions of Jews by country ==
Country	Date of expulsion	Expulsion lifted (de facto)	Expulsion lifted (de jure)
Austria	1421	1469	
England	1290	1656	1753–54
England	1290	1656	1829
France	1394	18th century	27 September 1791
Hungary	1349	1350	
Hungary	1360	1364	
Lithuania	1495	1503	
Milan	1597	1714	
Naples	1510	1735	
Nuremberg	1499	1850	
Portugal	1497	19th century	N/A
Sicily	31 December 1492	3 February 1740	
Spain	31 March 1492	19th century	16 December 1968
Yemen	1679; 29 March 2021		

== See also ==
- Aliyah
- Antisemitism
- Geography of antisemitism
- Historical Jewish population comparisons
- History of antisemitism
- Jewish diaspora
- Jewish ethnic divisions
- Jewish exodus from the Muslim world
- Jewish history
- Pogrom
- Persecution of Jews
- Refugee workers in Vichy France
- Yerida
