= Pedro de Almazán =

Conspirator against Pedro de Arbués

Pedro de Almazán was one of the conspirators against the inquisitor Pedro de Arbués. He escaped death by flight, but his wife Isabella, together with his brothers, Pedro and Manuel, were burned at the stake at Saragossa, January 25, 1487, while he himself was burned in effigy.
