= Holy Child of La Guardia =

Folk saint in Spanish Roman Catholicism

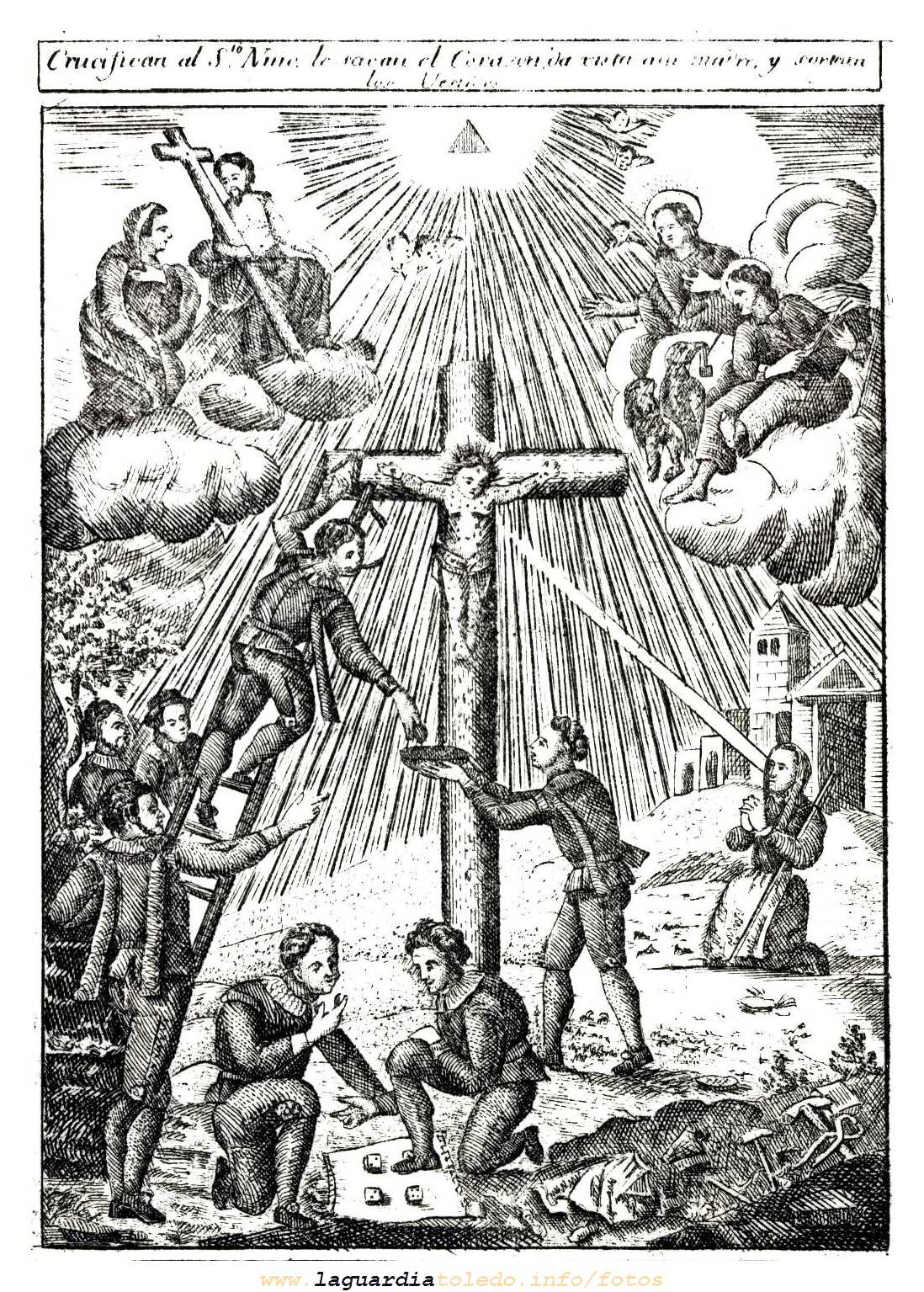
- An engraving with the martyrdom of the Holy Child of La Guardia
- Died: Good Friday, 1491
- Venerated in: Folk Catholicism
- Major shrine: Monastery of St. Thomas of Avila, La Guardia, Spain
- Controversy: blood libel

The Holy Child of La Guardia (Spanish: El Santo Niño de La Guardia) is a folk saint in Spanish Roman Catholicism and the subject of a medieval blood libel in the town of La Guardia in the central Spanish province of Toledo (Castile–La Mancha).

On 16 November 1491 an auto-da-fé Inquisition trial was held outside of Ávila that ended in six Conversos and two Jews being burnt at the stake. Among the executed were Benito García, the converso who initially confessed to the murder.

Though the suspects confessed under torture, no evidence of a child's death was ever procured. No body was ever found and there is no evidence that a child disappeared or was killed; because of contradictory confessions, the court had trouble coherently depicting how events possibly took place. The child's very existence is also disputed.

Like Pedro de Arbués, the Holy Infant was quickly made into a saint by popular acclaim, and his death greatly assisted the Spanish Inquisition and its Inquisitor General, Tomás de Torquemada, in their campaign against heresy and crypto-Judaism. The cult of the Holy Infant is still celebrated in La Guardia.

The Holy Child has been called Spain's "most infamous case of blood libel". The incident took place one year before the expulsion of the Jews from Spain, and the Holy Child was possibly used as a pretext for the expulsion.

In 2015, the Archdiocese of Madrid's official website published an article describing the Holy Child as a "martyr" and asserting that the events as described had actually taken place. As of 2025, the article is still online.

== Background ==
During the Middle Ages there were frequent blood libels leveled in Spain against the Jews, and the Seven Part Code of Castile (13th century) echoed this popular belief:

And because we have heard it said that in some places Jews celebrated, and still celebrate Good Friday, which commemorates the Passion of Our Lord Jesus Christ, by way of contempt: stealing children and fastening them to crosses, and making images of wax and crucifying them, when they cannot obtain children; we order that, hereafter, if in any part of our dominions anything like this is done, and can be proved, all persons who were present when the act was committed shall be seized, arrested and brought before the king; and after the king ascertains that they are guilty, he shall cause them to be put to death in a disgraceful manner, no matter how many there may be. (Alfonso X the Wise, Partidas, VII, XXIV, Law 2)

One of the best known blood libels in Spain was the alleged crucifixion of Little Saint Domingo of Val in Zaragoza in the 13th century, as well as the Boy of Sepúlveda in 1468. In the case in 1468, a report was spread that Jews had tortured and crucified a Christian child. Upon hearing this report, Juan Arias Davila, the Bishop of Segovia and son of baptized Jew Diego Arias Davila, ordered sixteen of the alleged suspects to be either burnt at the stake or hanged at the gallows. The population of Segovia then formed a mob, attacking and killing the remaining Jewish community (aljama) in Sepúlveda. Few escaped.

There is no evidence that any of these murders or related crimes took place. The accusations and consequent punishments of those accused are understood today to be examples of anti-Semitism.

== Accusation and trial ==
Until 1887 the story was known through the legend and in the trial papers deposited in the National Archives of Spain. In that year, the Spanish historian Fidel Fita published an account of the trial of Yucef Franco, one of the accused, in the Boletin de la Real Academia de la Historia, from the trial papers he had discovered in the Archive. It is one of the most complete accounts of a Spanish Inquisition trial extant.

In June 1490, a roving cloth carder, a converso named Benito García, aged 60, a native of the town of La Guardia, was stopped in Astorga in the province of León. A consecrated Host was discovered in his knapsack. He was taken for interrogation before the Vicar-general (Judicial Judge) of the Bishopric of Astorga, Pedro de Villada. The confession of Benito García, dated 6 June 1490, has survived and indicates that he was only accused of Judaizing. The defendant explained that five years earlier (1485) he had secretly returned to the Jewish faith, encouraged by another converso, Juan de Ocaña, who was also from La Guardia, and a Jew from the nearby locality of Tembleque, named Franco.

A Jewish cobbler, Yucef Franco, aged 20, from Tembleque was also mentioned by Benito García and then arrested by the Inquisition on 1 July 1490, along with his father Ça Franco, aged 80. He was in prison in Segovia on 19 July 1490, when he fell ill. He was visited by a doctor, Antonio de Ávila. Yucef asked the doctor if he could see a Rabbi. In place of a Rabbi, on his second visit the doctor was accompanied by a converso Friar, Alonso Enriquez, disguised as a Rabbi and calling himself Abrahán. When asked why he thought he had been arrested, Yucef replied that he was accused of the ritual murder of a Christian boy. The second time he was visited by the two men, Yucef made no further mention of this issue.

Yucef's subsequent statements implicated other Jews and conversos. On 27 August 1490 the Grand Inquisitor Tomás de Torquemada issued an indictment ordering the transfer of the prisoners from Segovia to Ávila to await trial. The indictment lists all the prisoners held in Segovia who were related to this case. They were conversos: Alonso Franco, Franco Lope, García Franco, Juan Franco, Juan de Ocaña, and García Benito, residents of La Guardia; and Jews: Yucef Franco of Tembleque, and Moses Abenamías of Zamora. The indictment contained charges of heresy, apostasy, as well as crimes against the Catholic faith. Curiously the indictment does not mention Ça Franco.

The inquisitors in charge of preparing the trial were Pedro de Villado (the same man who had previously interrogated Benito García in June 1490), Juan López de Cigales, Inquisitor of Valencia since 1487, and Friar Fenando de Santo Domingo. All were men who enjoyed the confidence of Torquemada. Santo Domingo had also written the foreword to a published anti-Semitic pamphlet.

The trial against Yucef Franco began on 17 December 1490 and lasted several months. He was accused of trying to attract conversos to Judaism as well as having participated in the ritual crucifixion of a Christian child on Good Friday. It seems that before the trial, Benito García and Yucef Franco, at least, had already partially confessed and given evidence against the others on the promise of obtaining their freedom, but this was a trap laid by the Inquisition.

When the indictment was read out, Yucef Franco shouted out that it was the biggest falsehood in the world. He was appointed Counsel for his defence who petitioned the court that the charges were too vague, no dates of the crime were given, there was no body, and that the victim had not even been named. As a Jew, Yucef could not be guilty of heresy or apostasy. The defense asked for complete acquittal. The petition was overruled by the court and the trial proceeded. The preserved confessions of this defendant, extracted under torture, refer at first only to conversations with Benito García in gaol and incriminate them only as Judaizers, but later start to refer to a piece of witchcraft performed about four years earlier (perhaps 1487), which involved the use of a consecrated host, stolen from a church in La Guardia, and the heart of a Christian boy. Yucef's subsequent statements give more details of this topic and are particularly incriminating of Benito García. García's statements have also been preserved, and taken "whilst he had been put to the torture" are inconsistent with those of Yucef, and above all serve mainly to incriminate the latter. The inquisitors even arranged a face-to-face confrontation between the two accused, on 12 October 1491, and the judicial records of this meeting state that their depositions were in agreement, which is surprising, as previously they had contradicted each other.

In October 1491, one of the inquisitors, Friar Fernando de San Esteban, travelled to the convent of San Esteban in Salamanca to consult with several legal experts and theologians, who pronounced on the guilt of the accused. In the final phase of the trial, the evidence was made public and Yucef tried unsuccessfully to refute it. The last depositions of Yucef, obtained under torture in November, added more details to the facts; many of them clearly had their origins in anti-Semitic literature.

On 16 November 1491, in the Brasero de la Dehesa (lit: "brazier in the meadow") in Ávila, all of the accused were handed over to the secular authorities and burned at the stake. Nine people were executed - three Jews: Yusef Franco, Ça Franco, and Moses Abenamías; and six conversos: Alonso, Lope, García and Juan Franco, Juan de Ocaña and Benito García. As was customary, the sentences were read out at the auto-da-fé, and those of Yucef Franco and Benito García have been preserved.

Property confiscated from the prisoners was used to finance the construction of the monastery of Santo Tomás de Ávila, which was completed on 3 August 1493.

== Legend ==
During the sixteenth century, there arose a legend according to which the death of the Holy Child was similar to that of Jesus Christ, even emphasising similarities between the topography of the Toledan town where the events are said to have occurred (La Guardia), and of Jerusalem where Jesus died.

In 1569, the graduate Sancho Busto de Villegas, a member of the Supreme Council of the Inquisition and governor of the Archbishopric of Toledo (afterwards Bishop of Avila) wrote, based on the trial documents, which were stored in the Valladolid court archives, Relación autorizada del martirio del Santo Inocente (Authorized Account of the Martyrdom of Saint Innocent), which was deposited in the municipal archives of La Guardia town hall. In 1583, Friar Rodrigo de Yepes published La Historia de la muerte y glorioso martirio del santo inocente que llaman de Laguardia (The History of the Death and Glorious Martyrdom of the Holy Innocent said to be from La Guardia). In 1720 another hagiography appeared in Madrid, La Historia del Inocente Trinity el Santo Niño de la Guardia (The History of the Trinitarian Innocent, the Holy Child of La Guardia), the work of Diego Martinez Abad, and in 1785, the village priest of La Guardia, Martín Martínez Moreno, published his Historia del martirio del Santo Niño de la Guardia (History of the Martyrdom of the Holy Child of La Guardia).

The legend constructed on these successive contributions relates that some converts, after attending an auto-da-fé in Toledo, planned revenge on the inquisitors by arts of sorcery. For the spell, they needed a consecrated Host and the heart of an innocent child. Alonso Franco and Juan Franco kidnapped the boy next to la Puerta del Perdón (the door of Forgiveness) in Toledo Cathedral and took him to La Guardia. There on Good Friday, they held a mock trial. The boy, who in the legend is sometimes called Juan and at other times Cristóbal, is said to be the son of Alonso de Pasamonte and Juana la Guindero (even though no body was ever found). Local Christians thought he had been scourged, crowned with thorns and crucified at the mock trial, in imitation of Jesus Christ. The heart, needed for the spell, was torn out. At the exact time of the child's death, his mother, who was blind, miraculously regained her sight. After burying the body, the murderers stole a consecrated Host. Benito García set out for Zamora, carrying the Host and the heart to seek the help of other coreligionists to perform his spell, but was stopped in Ávila (a considerable distance from Astorga, which is nowhere near the Toledo/Zamora road) because of the brilliant light that issued from the consecrated Host the convert had hidden between the pages of a prayer-book. Thanks to his confession, the other participants in the crime were discovered. After the death of the Holy Child is said to have occurred, several miraculous healings were attributed to him.

The consecrated Host is kept in the Dominican monastery of St. Thomas in Ávila. The heart was said to have miraculously disappeared, like the child's body, and legends arose that like Jesus Christ he had been resurrected.

== In art and literature ==
Yepes mentioned that there was an altarpiece, now lost, in the chapel of the Holy Child of La Guardia in the town, which Alonso de Fonseca, archbishop of Toledo, had ordered to be painted, representing the scenes of the abduction, prosecution, scourging and crucifixion of the child, as well as the apprehension and execution of his murderers. The central panel of this altarpiece showed the crucifixion and removal of the child's heart.

In the National History Archives in Madrid, there is a painting of the second half of the sixteenth century representing the same scene, which seemingly testifies to the antiquity of the cult of the Holy Child of La Guardia.

There is a mural Bayeu attributed to the representation of the crucifixion of the Holy Child of La Guardia in Toledo cathedral. It can be accessed through the door called "del Mollete". Currently, the humidity and exposure to inclement weather found in the interior of the cathedral cloister have led to the painting deteriorating.

Lope de Vega's play El niño inocente de La Guardia (The Innocent Child of La Guardia) was possibly inspired by the legend recounted by Fray Rodrigo de Yepes. This work from the Golden Age of Spanish Literature is renowned for its cruelty in the last act, portraying the crucifixion of the child. The scene was imitated by José de Cañizares, author of La viva imagen de Cristo: El Santo Niño de la Villa de la Guardia (The Living Image of Christ: The Holy Child of Villa de la Guardia).

In one of the legends of Gustavo Adolfo Bécquer, called La Rosa de Pasión (The Rose of Passion), a Jew named Sara, whose boyfriend was a Christian, confronts her father, Daniel, on his hatred of Christians, and dies in a ritual very similar to the Santo Niño de la Guardia (in fact, seeing the preparations, she thinks about the history of the Holy Child).

== Impact ==
The impact of the legend had immediate and far-reaching consequences for both the Jewish community in Spain and for the Spanish nobility:

With Torquemada's urging, it was used by Isabella I as one of the reasons for the expulsion of the Jews after the fall of Granada in 1492.

Because of the fear that heresy was hereditary, the outcome of this trial involving conversos and Jews, was used to argue for the purity of blood (limpieza de sangre) in those aspiring to join the clergy of the archdiocese of Toledo. Many members of the nobility could not prove their untainted ancestry and thus became ineligible to hold office in the main See of Spain.

== See also ==
- Dominguito del Val
- Gavriil of Belostok
- List of unsolved murders
- Little Saint Hugh of Lincoln
- Menahem Mendel Beilis
- Satanic ritual abuse
- Simon of Trent
