= Valerius of Saragossa =

Spanish bishop and saint (died 315)

Saint Valerius of Saragossa
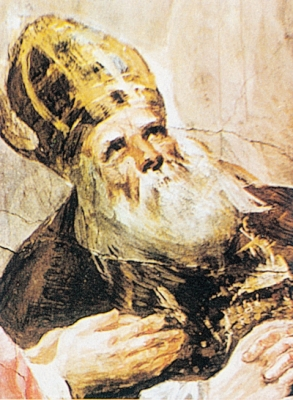
- San Valero; fresco by Francisco de Goya in the Basilica of Our Lady of the Pillar, Zaragoza
- Died: 315 AD
- Venerated in: Roman Catholic Church; Orthodox Church
- Feast: January 22
- Patronage: Zaragoza

Saint Valerius of Saragossa (Spanish: San Valero; Aragonese: Sant Valero; died 315 AD) is the patron saint of Zaragoza (formerly also known in English as Saragossa). He was bishop of this city from 290 until his death. He assisted at the Council of Elvira. His feast day is January 29.

== History ==
Saint Valerius (4th century) was born in Caesaraugusta (Zaragoza) and became bishop of the city. He participated in the council of Elbira (Granada), possibly around the year 306, and ordained Vincent of Saragossa as a deacon, commissioned to preach in the diocese. Since Valerius had a speech impediment, Vincent became his spokesman. Valerius has been described as somewhat timid and retiring. Both Valerius and Vincent suffered imprisonment under Diocletian.

Valerius was held captive in Valencia during Diocletian's persecution and banished for a time. to a place called Enetum, near Barbastro. He died about 315.

== Veneration ==
In 1050, some remains that were considered his were transferred to Roda de Isábena, and from 1118, after the entry into Zaragoza of the Christian troops of Alfonso I, the Battler, these remains were transferred to Zaragoza in successive shipments throughout several decades.

A chapel dedicated to him can be found at the Catedral del Salvador. It includes a baroque entryway of gilded wood from the seventeenth century with scenes of the saints Valerius, Vincent, and Lawrence. The walls were painted by García Ferrer. There is also a reliquary bust of San Valerio, which was donated by Pope Benedict XIII in 1397.

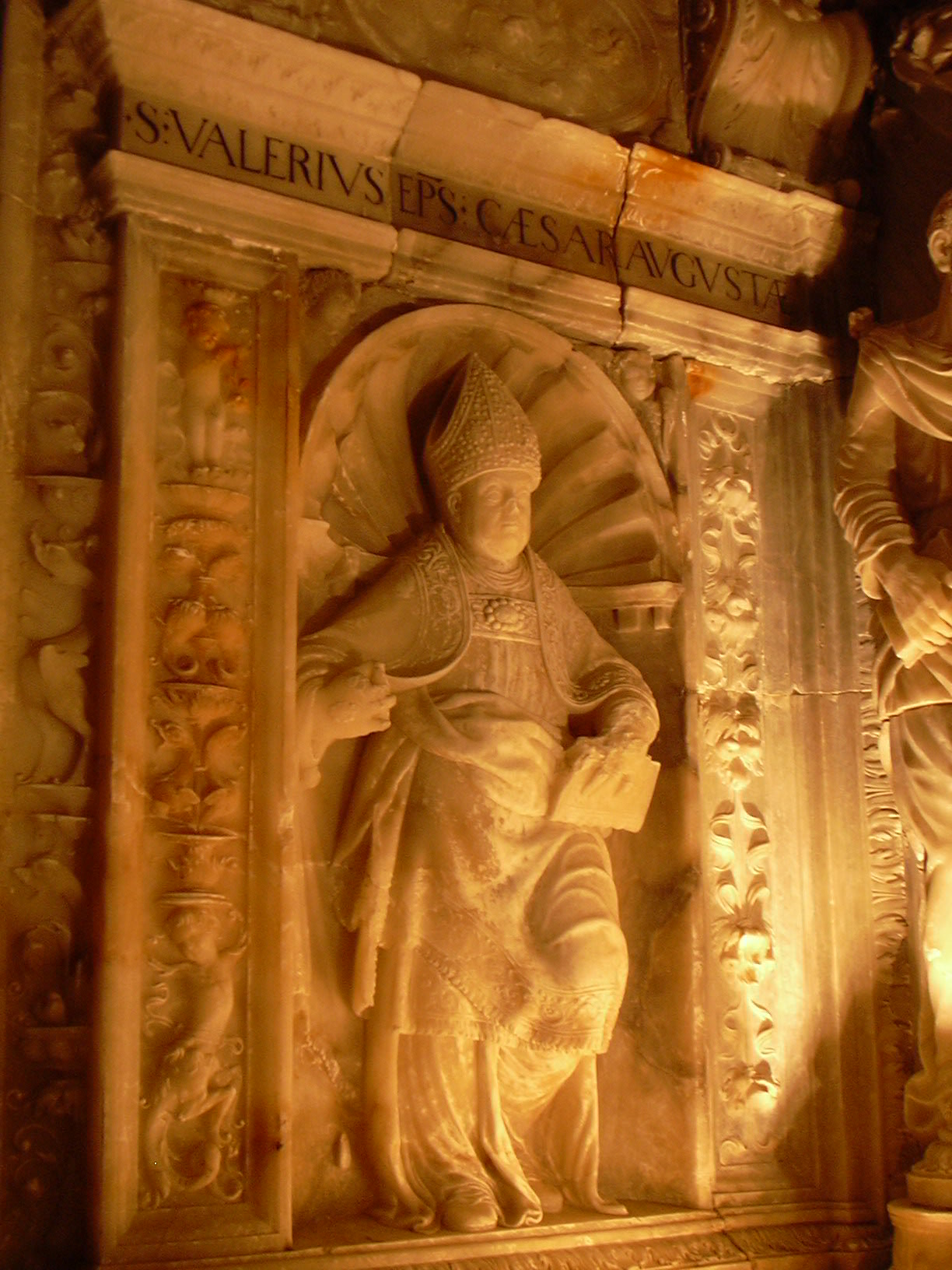
Statue of Valerius

There is a statue of San Valerio on the sepulcher of Abbot Lope Marco in the Monastery of Santa María de Veruela. Valerio was also honored in Ribagorça.

=== Patronage ===
Venerated by the people of Zaragoza, he is the patron saint of the city.

It is traditional to mark the feast of San Valerio by eating roscones. The sweet bread-based ring-shaped dessert is decorated with candied fruit and icing and represents the saint's crown. According to the Provincial Association of Confectionery and Pastry Entrepreneurs of Zaragoza, which brings together some 60 establishments, for San Valero the Aragonese usually consume more than 150,000 roscones to sweeten the after-meal. Since 1992, it has been customary to taste the traditional roscón in the Plaza del Pilar in front of Zaragoza City Hall and then go to enjoy shows and other events that usually take place in places such as the Plaza de San Pedro Nolasco.
