= Diego de Pontac =

Spanish composer

Diego Pontac, later in life Diego de Pontac (1603 in Loarre – 1654 in Madrid) was a Spanish composer. He began his career as a pupil at Saragossa Cathedral, and ended his career at the Court of Madrid as teniente de maestro (deputy master) of the Royal Chapel of Philip IV of Spain.
