= Dominguito del Val =

Spanish child saint and murder victim

Saint Dominguito del Val
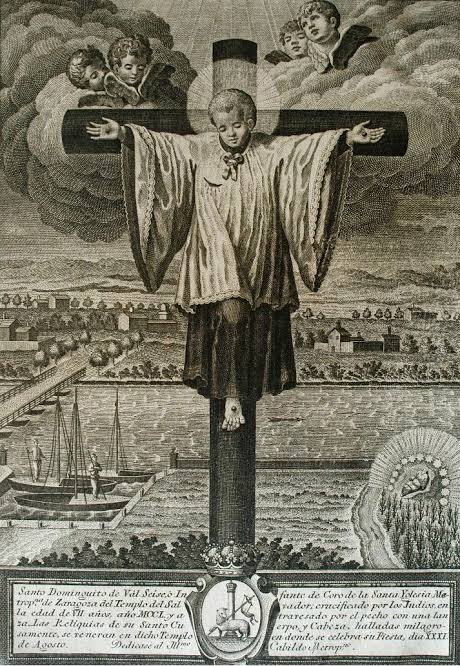
- Martyrdom of Saint Dominguito del Val by Mateo Gonzalez, circa 1793.

Martyr
- Born: c. 1243; Zaragoza, Kingdom of Aragon
- Died: c. 1250 (aged 7); Zaragoza, Kingdom of Aragon
- Cause of death: Crucifixion and Human sacrifice
- Venerated in: Catholic Church
- Canonized: 12 May 1807, Saint Peter's Basilica, Papal State by Pope Pius VII
- Major shrine: Chapel of Santo Dominguito del Val, Cathedral of the Savior, Zaragoza, Spain
- Feast: 31 August
- Attributes: Wearing an altar server vestment, while he nailed on the cross, martyr's palm and crown of martyrdom
- Patronage: Altar servers, acolytes and choirboys

Dominguito del Val (c. 1243 – c. 1250) was a legendary child in medieval Spain, allegedly a choirboy ritually murdered by Jews in Zaragoza (Saragossa). Dominguito is the protagonist in one of the first blood libel in the history of Spain – stories that grew in prominence in the 12th and 13th centuries and contributed to the rise of antisemitism in late medieval Spain. According to the legend, Dominguito was ritually murdered by Jews of Zaragoza.

Saint Dominguito is no longer included on the official Roman Catholic liturgical calendar; however, there is still a chapel dedicated to him in the cathedral of Zaragoza. There exists little historical evidence of Dominguito aside from the stories and legends built around him.

== Dominguito's legend ==
The historical basis for Dominguito is unclear. No medieval references to the legend have been found; the first texts that recount the tale date from 1583, three hundred thirty-three years after the fact. The story appears to have been largely copied from the legend of Little Saint Hugh of Lincoln, collected by Fray Alonso de Espina. According to the accounts, Alfonso X of Castile wrote the original rendition of the story in 1250, saying: "We have heard it said that some very cruel Jews, in memory of the Passion of Our Lord on Good Friday, kidnapped a Christian boy and crucified him."

According to the legend, Dominguito was born on 1243 in Zaragoza and was admitted as a cathedral altar-boy and chorister at La Seo because of his beautiful voice. He disappeared on 31 August 1250, when he was seven years old. Some months later, some boatmen discovered the decomposed corpse on the bank of Ebro river.

The story goes that one day on his way home the boy met a Jew by the name of Albayuceto, who deceived him and brought him to a house in the Jewish quarter, where he was nailed to a cross and tortured until he died. In an effort to dispose of the body, they beheaded him, cut off his feet and buried the corpse on the banks of the Ebro River.

The child's bones were later interred in the cathedral, where in the chapel of Santo Dominguito del Val they are still revered as holy relics. Though he was officially removed from the Roman Martyrology after the Second Vatican Council due to lack of historical proof, Dominguito continued to be revered as a saint and celebrated every 31 August in the diocese of Zaragoza up to 2017.

The story resembles others like the so-called "Holy Child" of La Guardia (inspired by a real inquisitorial process in 1491).

The story has similarities with other tales circulating in late-medieval Europe alleging the murder of a child at the hands of Jews. These were symptomatic of the growing anti-Semitism towards the end of the Middle Ages, when it became common to blame the Jewish community for any misfortune (weather, droughts, etc.). Often, these stories were used to rationalize imposing greater repressive measures against the Jews.

== Sources ==
- Álvarez Chillida, Gonzalo (2002). The Antisemitism in Spain. The image of the Jew (1812–2002). Madrid: Marcial Pons. p. 47. ISBN 978-84-95379-49-8.
- Whitechapel, Simon. Flesh Inferno: Atrocities of Torquemada and the Spanish Inquisition (Creation Books, 2003). ISBN 1-84068-105-5
