= Juan Ramírez (painter) =

Spanish portrait painter

Juan Ramírez was a Spanish portrait painter, who lived about the middle of the 16th century. A great number of his portraits exist at Seville and in its neighbourhood.
