= Gonzalo Álvarez Chillida =

Spanish historian (born 1958)

- Born: 1958 (age 67–68); San Sebastián, Spain
- Education: Autonomous University of Madrid
- Occupations: Historian, senior lecturer, baccalaureate tenured teacher
- Employer: Complutense University of Madrid (2002–present)
- Awards: Samuel Toledano Prize (2004)

Gonzalo Álvarez Chillida (born 1958) is a Spanish historian. He has been referred to as the leading Spanish expert in the study of antisemitism in Spain.

== Biography ==
Born in 1958 in San Sebastián, he earned a PhD at the Autonomous University of Madrid (UAM). His dissertation was titled José María Pemán: un contrarrevolucionario en la crisis española del siglo XX. He is tenured professor of the history of Thought and Social and Political Movements at the Complutense University of Madrid (UCM).

== Works ==
Author

- — (1996). José María Pemán: pensamiento y trayectoria de un monárquico: (1897–1941). Cádiz: Servicio de Publicaciones de la Universidad de Cádiz.
- — (2002). El antisemitismo en España. La imagen del judío (1812–2002). Madrid: Marcial Pons.

Co-author

- Tusell, Javier; Álvarez Chillida, Gonzalo (1999). Pemán. Un trayecto intelectual desde la extrema derecha hasta la democracia. Barcelona: Planeta.
