= Expulsion of the Jews from Navarre =

1498 decree expelling Jews from the Kingdom of Navarre

The Expulsion of the Jews from Navarre was decreed in 1498 by John III of Navarre and Catherine of Navarre under pressure from Ferdinand II of Aragon.

Exiled Jews from Castile and Aragon sought refuge in Navarre after 1492 in places such as Tudela, thereby forking the Navarrese jewry into judíos nativos ('native Jews') and judíos nuevamente venidos ('newly arrived Jews'). The order of expulsion set a March 1498 deadline, offering Jews the choice of leaving or converting to Christianity. When this occurred, some of the Jews emigrated to Provence. However having no easy way out of landlocked Navarre, most Jews converted and remained in the kingdom. In Tudela alone 180 Jewish families were baptized. The Navarrese transferred their hatred to these new Christians, entire districts refusing to tolerate them. They were excluded from public office and were even centuries later, objects of undisguised contempt as secret adherents of Judaism.

New Christians and their descendants, had altering periods of prosperity in 16th- and 17th-century Navarre.
