= Pedro de Arbués =

Spanish canon regular and inquisitor (c.1441–1485)

Saint Pedro de Arbués CanReg
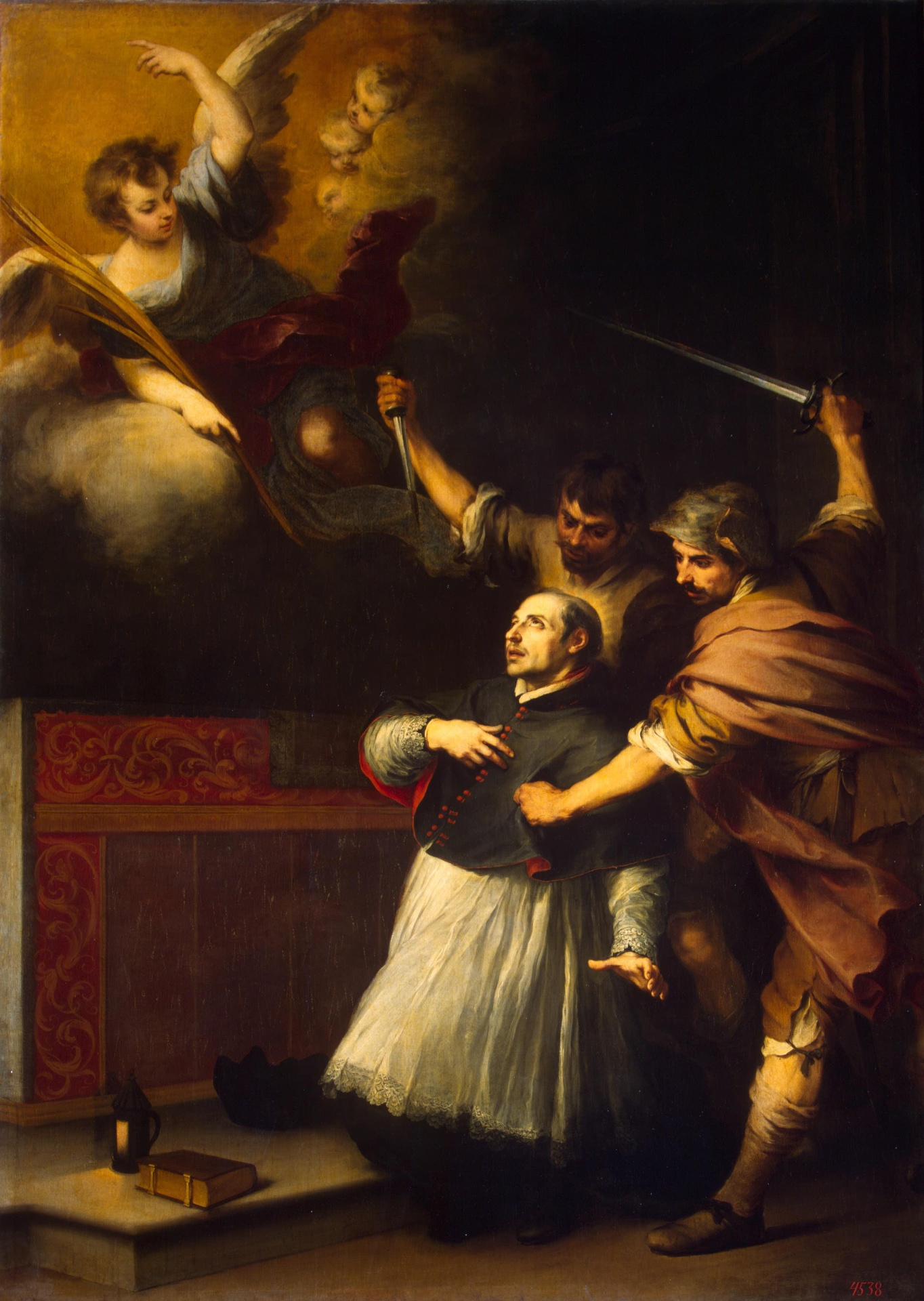
- Death of the Inquisitor Pedro de Arbués (1664), by Murillo (Hermitage Museum, Saint Petersburg).

Martyr
- Born: ca. 1441; Épila, Kingdom of Aragon
- Died: 17 September 1485 (aged 44); Zaragoza, Kingdom of Aragon
- Venerated in: Roman Catholic Church
- Beatified: 20 April 1664, Saint Peter's Basilica, Papal States by Pope Alexander VII
- Canonized: 29 June 1867, Saint Peter's Basilica, Papal States by Pope Pius IX
- Major shrine: Cathedral of the Savior, Zaragoza, Spain
- Feast: 17 September

Pedro de Arbués, also known as Peter of Arbués (c. 1441 – 17 September 1485) was a Spanish Roman Catholic priest and a professed Augustinian canon. He served as an official of the Spanish Inquisition until he was assassinated in the La Seo Cathedral in Zaragoza in 1485 by Jews and conversos. The veneration of him came swiftly through popular acclaim. His death greatly assisted the Inquisitor-General Tomás de Torquemada's campaign against heretics and crypto-Jews. His canonization was celebrated on 29 June 1867.

As a result, a popular movement against the Jews arose in which nine were executed, two killed themselves, thirteen were burnt in effigy, and four punished for complicity, from 30 June to 15 December 1486, according to the historian Jerónimo Zurita. Leonardo Sciascia in Morte dell'inquisitore (1964) writes (erroneously) that Arbués along with Juan Lopez de Cisneros (d. 1657) are "the only two cases of inquisitors who died assassinated".

== Life ==
Pedro de Arbués was born at Épila in the region of Zaragoza to the nobleman Antonio de Arbués and Sancia Ruiz.

He studied philosophy perhaps in Huesca but later travelled to Bologna on a scholarship to the Spanish College of Saint Clement which was part of the Bologna college. He obtained his doctorate in 1473 while he served as a professor of moral philosophical studies or ethics. Upon his return to Spain he became a member of the cathedral chapter of the canons regular at La Seo where he made his religious profession in 1474.

At around that time Ferdinand and Isabella had obtained from Pope Sixtus IV a papal bull to establish in their kingdom a tribunal for searching out heretics, the Inquisition had been first established in Spain in Aragón, 14th century, to counteract the Catharism heresy. Those Jews who had received baptism were known as conversos; some might have continued to practice Judaism in secret, called 'judaizantes'. Tomás de Torquemada, a Marrano surname, was in 1483 appointed as the Grand Inquisitor for Castile. Espina, confessor of Isabella, was formerly a rabbi. Torquemada then appointed Arbués and Pedro Gaspar Juglar as Inquisitors Provincial in the Kingdom of Aragon on 4 May 1484. Their work was opposed by converts and people who saw it as a threat to their freedoms.

== Murder ==
On 14 September 1485 Pedro was attacked in the cathedral as he knelt before the altar and had been wearing armour since he knew his work posed great risks. Despite wearing a helmet and chain mail under the tunic he died from his wounds on 17 September. His remains were entombed in a special chapel dedicated to him. The Inquisition was unpopular in Aragon as it was seen as a Castilian attack on the charters, privileges and local laws. The most powerful families among the converted Jews: the Sánchez, Montesa, Abadía (AbdYah), Paterno and Santangel families seem to have been involved in funding the murder.

Following the assassination, authorities arrested and prosecuted several people suspected of involvement. Many of the accused were conversos, and some were prominent figures in Aragonese society. Among them was Francisco de Santa Fe, a grandson of the well-known convert Gerónimo de Santa Fe, who committed suicide in prison; his body was burned and the ashes thrown into the river. Several converso officials fled to Navarre and escaped, but others were captured, mutilated, and executed. The hands of some were cut off and nailed to the cathedral door in Zaragoza before they were beheaded and quartered. Luis de Santangel, a notable official, was beheaded and his head displayed on a pole while his body was burned. In 1489, the Inquisition awarded Arbues's sister property confiscated from Luis de Santangel to fund her marriage.

The purge extended beyond those directly implicated in the murder. In 1488, Juan de la Caballería was put on trial and later died in prison. Contemporary chronicler Hernando del Pulgar reported that there were many wealthy conversos in high public office and claimed some dismissed the need for an inquisition altogether. Others, Pulgar wrote, feared persecution and resorted to violence, believing the Inquisitor was motivated more by personal animosity than religious zeal. While it is commonly accepted in Spain that the conspirators were conversos, Pulgar's testimony also acknowledged the involvement of "old Christians", but none of them was tried or punished. The trials that followed the assassination appear to have provided an opportunity to eliminate influential converso figures under the mantle of rooting out heresy.

== Sainthood ==
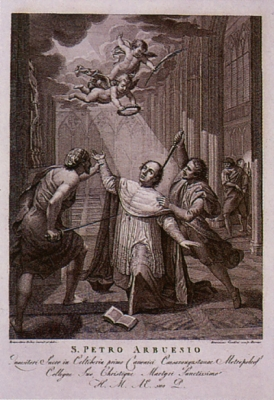
The Martyrdom of Saint Peter of Arbués - Francesco Cecchini (late 17th century).

Pope Alexander VII beatified Pedro de Arbués in Rome on 20 April 1664. His canonization was celebrated on 29 June 1867. Pope Pius IX said in the document formalizing the canonization (Maiorem caritatem): "The divine wisdom has arranged that in these sad days, when Jews help the enemies of the church with their books and money, this decree of sanctity has been brought to fulfillment".
