= Jerónimo Blancas =

Spanish Latinist, historian

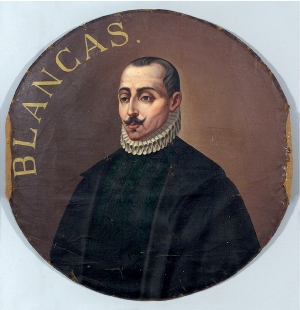
- Portrait of Jerónimo Blancas

Chief Chronicler of the Kingdom of Aragon
- In office 1581–1590
- Preceded by: Jerónimo Zurita
- Succeeded by: Juan Costa y Beltrán

Jerónim de Blancas y Tomás, (Zaragoza, c.1530/40 - ibidem, 11 December 1590) was a Latinist and an influential legal historian active in the Crown of Aragon.

He studied at the University of Zaragoza. In 1576 he revised the second part of the Annals of the Crown of Aragon by Jerónimo Zurita at the request of the deputies of the Generalidad de Aragón. He succeeded to the post of Chief Chronicler of the Kingdom Aragon on the death of Jerónimo Zurita in 1580. After his death in 1590 he was buried in the monastery of Santa Engracia in Zaragoza.

== Work ==
In Ad regum Aragonum depictas efigies in diputationis aula positas inscriptiones(published in Zaragoza, 1587) the epigraphs in Latin of the gallery of portraits of the counts and kings of Aragon destined to decorate the royal hall of the Diputación del General del Reino. These inscriptions contained brief biographies of these kings and counts. In the same year he printed Fastos de los Justicias de Aragón hasta Juan IV de Lanuza, the Latin footnotes to the portraits of the Justicias located in the council chamber of their seat.

However, his main work is Aragonensium rerum commentarii (Commentaries on Aragon), published in Zaragoza by Lorenzo and Diego Robles in 1588. In it he explains the historical origin of the Aragonese institution of Justicia de Aragón, which is completed with an account of the deeds of almost fifty Justices, ranging from Pedro Jiménez to Juan IV de Lanuza. His Coronations of the kings and queens of Aragon, which he wrote in 1583 although it was not printed until 1641, was widely distributed. It is the chronicle of the coronations of the kings since Pedro II. In Modos de proceder en Cortes de Aragón, which dates from 1585 and was also published in 1641, he analyses the Aragonese Corts. He also wrote a Summary of the Cortes, useful for accessing the contents of the acts of the Cortes that have not been preserved.

He also wrote genealogical treatises on some of the most important families of the Aragonese nobility, such as the Lanuza and Biota families. Along the same lines is his book Linajes del reino de Aragón (Lineages of the Kingdom of Aragon).

He edited and commented some important historical works, among which the Crónica by Ramón Muntaner, the Historia de las alteraciones de Cataluña, the Crónica de Marfilo, the Itinerario de Antonino Pío and many others stand out.

In Treatise on the coming of the apostle Saint James, written in Latin, he comments on the legend of the presence of James the Great in the Iberian Peninsula. Of a secular nature are works such as the one that relates news about the ecclesiastics of the diocese of Zaragoza.

Lacking his predecessor Zurita's rigorous method of collating and critiquing sources, his prose style was nevertheless notable for its elegance, an aspect in which he was ahead of Zurita, whose prose is at times disjointed, perhaps due to the scrupulous respect for the sources of different origin with which he composed his historiographical work. Thus, Jerónimo Blancas often admitted legendary explanations about the origins of the kingdom and counties of Aragon, noticeably when he attempted to conciliate the many legends surrounding the mythical Charters of Sobrarbe into a semi-coherent narrative with which to justify the origin of many of the Crown of Aragon's secular institutions.

Jerónimo Blancas also owes a record of words of the Aragonese language, unusual in the Modern Age, which are included in a glossary annexed to his Coronations of the kings of Aragon, mainly from the sphere of institutions and the court, although some expressions from the colloquial language also appear. On the other hand, in the Aragonensium rerum comentarii he includes a parliament of Martín I written in Aragonese, on the occasion of his presentation before the Cortes of Aragon in 1398 in La Seo before the arms of the Aragonese courts, as well as the reply, with Aragonese and Catalan linguistic features of the bishop of the cathedral of Zaragoza.
