= Ángel Dolado =

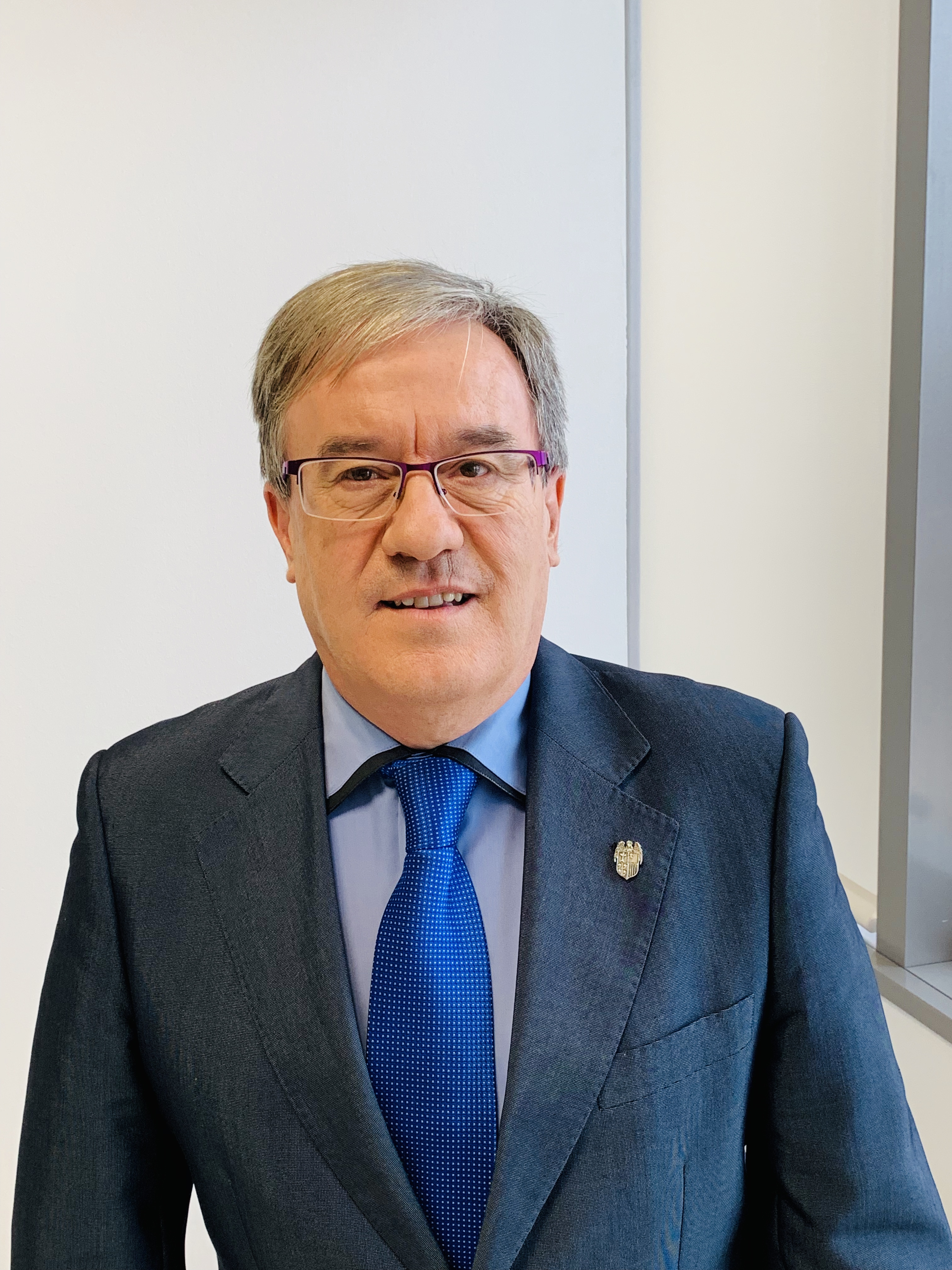

70th Justice of Aragon
- In office April 20, 2018 – June 2, 2023
- Preceded by: Fernando García Vicente
- Succeeded by: Concepción Gimeno Gracia

Personal details
- Born: Soria, Spain
- Education: Law
- Alma mater: University of Zaragoza
- Profession: Judge

Ángel Dolado Pérez (born 1962) is a retired judge, court clerk, and prosecutor. He served as Justice of Aragon from April 2018 to June 2023.

== Career ==
He was born in Soria in 1962, but his family moved to Zaragoza when he was three years old. He lived and studied in the neighborhoods of Oliver and Delicias.

He earned a degree in law from the University of Zaragoza in 1985. In 1990, he passed the competitive exams to become a court clerk, prosecutor, and judge, ultimately choosing the judicial career while taking leave from the other two positions.

He entered the judicial career in March 1990, serving in the Court of First Instance and Investigation of Balaguer.

After working in the courts of Reus, Tarragona, and Lleida, he joined the courts of Zaragoza in 1998.

In 2008, he was elected Dean Judge of Zaragoza, and was unanimously re-elected in 2012, serving until 2017.

His last position in the Zaragoza courts was as a Family Judge.

He was President of the Independent Judicial Forum until 2013, and received several honors, including the Medal of Penitentiary Social Merit, the Silver Medal of the Zaragoza Local Police, Honorary Procurator of the Zaragoza Bar, and the Medal of Merit in the Service to the Legal Profession — the first ever awarded by the General Council of Spanish Lawyers to a judge.

An expert in Aragonese Regional Law, he has taught Procedural Law as an associate professor in the Faculty of Law at the University of Zaragoza.

He has delivered numerous lectures and courses on Aragonese civil law, procedural law, consumer rights, mediation, and arbitration.

== Justice of Aragon ==
On April 19, 2018, the Cortes of Aragon appointed him, at the proposal of Chunta Aragonesista, with 46 votes in favor and 20 abstentions, as Justice of Aragon, replacing Fernando García Vicente, who had held the position for 19 years, four of them in an acting capacity due to the lack of political consensus on a successor. Dolado took office setting out nine main goals:

- Protection of minors
- Promotion of agreements in education and healthcare
- Fight against depopulation
- Defense of Aragonese identity
- Strengthening transparency
- Mediation and promotion of Aragonese Civil Law
- Restructuring of the Ombudsman's staff and optimizing its resources
- Collaboration with social organizations

When his term ended in April 2023 and no successor had yet been chosen, he announced his intention to retire from professional life and not to seek reappointment.

Finally, due to health issues, he also resigned from continuing in an acting capacity on June 2, 2023. His deputy, Javier Hernández, served as acting Justice until the Cortes of Aragon appointed Concepción Gimeno Gracia as the new Justice of Aragon.

== Awards and honors ==
- Honorary Member of the Zaragoza College of Procurators
- Silver Medal of the Zaragoza Local Police
- Silver Medal for Penitentiary Social Merit from the Ministry of the Interior
- Gold Medal of the Faculty of Law of Zaragoza
- Medal of Merit in Service to the Legal Profession, General Council of Spanish Lawyers
- Moisés Calvo Award from the Soriano Center of Zaragoza
- Recognition for professional work by the College of Social Workers of Aragon
- Cross with White Decoration of the Order of Merit of the Civil Guard
- Award for the Defense of Consumers, Torre Ramona Consumers Association
- Extraordinary ASAPME Award for commitment to protecting the rights of people with mental illness
- Award from the Association of Local Police of Aragon
- “Peón” Award from the Rey Ardid Foundation
