= Fueros de Sobrarbe =

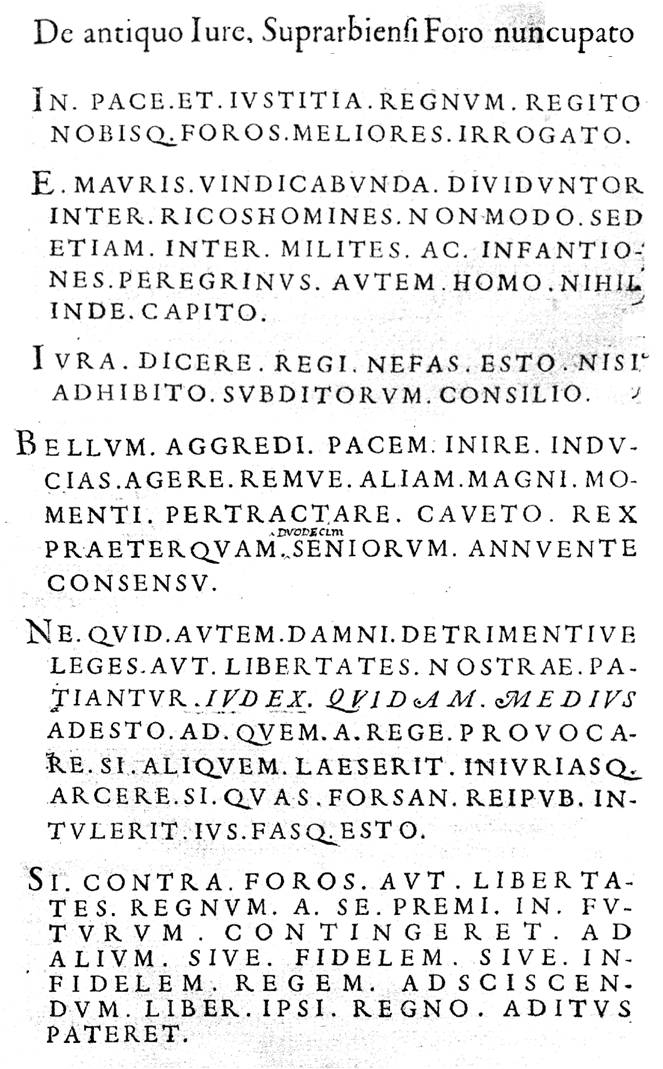
Tex of the Fueros de Sobrarbe contained in Aragonensium rerum commentarii by Jerónimo Blancas

The Fueros de Sobrarbe (Spanish: [ˈfweɾos ðe soˈβɾaɾβe]; lit. Charters of Sobrarbe) are a mythical set of charters allegedly enacted during the 850s in the Pyrenean valley of Sobrarbe. The Fueros were said to have been issued by Christian refugees fleeing from the Muslim invasion of the Iberian peninsula, and enshrined the Aragonese legal custom of placing laws before kings. Although the charters were extensively studied and exploited in later centuries, modern scholarship regards them as a fabrication.

In the 13th century, the cities and the nobility of the kingdoms of Navarre and of Aragon started using these legendary fueros as a foundation for their own legal rights and privileges. The first historical mention of the Fueros de Sobrarbe appears in this context, as part of a falsified version of the original city charter of Tudela backdated to 1117. The original charter of Tudela, likely issued in 1119–1121, was manipulated sometime at the beginning of the reign of Theobald I of Navarre (r. 1234–1253). Having inherited a distant kingdom from his maternal uncle, Theobald I agreed to have the customary laws of his newly acquired realm codified, and the citizens of Tudela presented the crown with a forged version of their own city charter that mentioned for the first time the Fueros de Sobrarbe as the foundation of their historical rights. In 1237, Theobald I agreed to confirm this manipulated charter. Thereafter, the Fueros de Sobrarbe were included in many of the city charters of Aragonese and Navarrese frontier towns, and eventually made it to both the Fueros of Navarre (1238) and the Fueros de Aragon (1283). In both of them, the Fueros are mentioned as the historical foundation of those kingdoms and their institutions.

The Fueros de Sobrarbe and their creation were described in detail by the legal historian Jerónimo Blancas in his Aragonensium rerum commentarii, first published in 1587. As his predecessors before him, Blancas used the Fueros as a means of justifying several aspects of Aragonese law, particularly the institution of the Justicia de Aragon and the legal precept that royal authority was bound by laws, rather than a source thereof. Modern historiography regards the Fueros de Sobrarbe themselves as a medieval forgery, and the High Middle Ages versions described by Blancas as a fabrication to which many different authors contributed over several centuries, starting in the mid-13th century with the charter of Tudela.

The significance of the Fueros de Sobrarbe lies not in their lack of historicity, but in the verisimilitude they were awarded up until the 18th century, both as the constitutional foundation of many of the institutions of the kingdoms of Navarre and Aragon, and because they enshrined the legal principle of placing "laws before kings".

== The Fueros de Sobrarbe according to Jerónimo Blancas ==
Jerónimo Blancas, writing during the reign of Philip II, published his Aragonensium rerum commentarii ("Commentary on things Aragonese") to explain the origin, history, power and dignity of the institution of the Justicia de Aragon. The book, published in 1587, recounts the history of the kingdom with regard to the institution of Justice, beginning with a Kingdom of Sobrarbe which, according to Blancas, preceded the Kingdom of Aragon. A key part of the myth of the foundation of the kingdom are the fueros that the first settlers of Sobrarbe wrote during the interregnum between their fourth and fifth king, Sancho Garcés (r. 815–832 according to Blancas) and Íñigo Arista (r. 868–870 according to Blancas). According to Blancas, the Fueros de Sobrarbe were a compilation of the six basic foundational charters which king Íñigo Arista swore to abide by upon being elected as king of Sobrarbe, as a means of asserting his wish that both he and his successors would reign under the law:

I. In peace and justice thou shalt rule the kingdom, and give us better fueros.

II. Whatsoever shall be conquered from the Moors, let it be divided not only among the rich men, but also among the knights and infanzones; but let nothing be received by the foreigner.

III. It shall not be lawful for the king to legislate without hearing the opinion of his subjects.

IV. From starting war, making peace, settling a truce, or dealing with anything else of great interest, you shall beware, O King, without the consent of the council of the seniors.

V. And so that our laws or liberties may not be injured or impaired, a mediator Judge shall watch, to whom it shall be lawful and permitted to appeal from the King, if he shall injure any one, and to reject injuries if perhaps he shall inflict them on the republic.

To which the Arista himself added a sixth charter:

VI. If He should hereafter tyrannise the kingdom against the fueros or liberties, the kingdom should be free to choose another king, even if he were a pagan.

This construction allowed Blancas to take the institution of the Justicia and the fueros back to the origins of the Kingdom of Aragon, making them appear at the same time as the new king was elected.

== Creation ==
The historical and legal genealogy employed by Blancas developed over five centuries and had two main sources, the first being the Fuero of Tudela (Charter of Tudela) and the second the writings of medieval Aragonese jurists associated with the office of the Justicia de Aragon. The mythical history of early Aragón offered by Blancas, including the existence of a Kingdom of Sobrarbe and a questionable line of kings of Sobrarbe was deeply problematic even at the time, and it largely stems from an attempt by Charles of Viana at conciliating other, even more anachronistic traditions.

=== The Fuero of Tudela ===
The first historical mention to the Fueros of Sobrarbe is found in the city charter that Alfonso I granted the city Tudela. The extant document is dated to 1117, the year of the city's conquest from the arabs. The original document, likely issued sometime between 1119 and 1124, is lost. The extant copies of the Fuero of Tudela begin with a remembrance of the origin of the Fueros of Sobrarbe, describing how Spain was lost and how some knights took refuge in the mountains of Sobrarbe. The knights began to argue about how to divide the spoils of their rides and, in order to avoid conflicts, they decided to ask the Apostolic Aldebrano in Rome, Lombardy and France for advice, perhaps a reference to either Aldebrannus I or Aldebrannus II, both almost consecutive bishops of the then episcopal see of Tricastin in Occitania, and the latter also an influential jurist in the court of Charlemagne. The advice was to choose a king, but to write their laws first. This is what they did, first writing their charters and then electing Don Pelayo as king. Before appointing him king they demanded that he swear, among others, the following charters: that he should always improve their charters; that he should divide the conquered lands with the rich men and knights of the kingdom, and not with foreigners; that he should not appoint foreign officials; and that he should always consult his rich men before declaring war, peace or truce, or making other important decisions.

The context in which the Fuero de Tudela mentions Sobrarbe is the following:

... done et concedo omnibus populatoribus en Tudela et habitantibus in es, ae etiam in Cervera y Gallipienzo, illos bonos foros de Superarbe, ut habeant eos sicut meliores infanzones totius regni mei ...

Modern historiography regards this version, mentioning the Fueros de Sobrarbe, as a late 1230s interpolation in the now lost original charter. During the reign of Sancho VII the Strong (1157–1234), the city of Tudela in Navarre had seen its territory dwindle in favour of the crown: the king resided in the city, and the corporation of the city had seen many new taxes levied to fund Sancho VII's campaigns and his court. At the death of king Sancho VII, the throne of Navarre passed to his nephew Teobaldo I (1201–1253) of the House of Champagne. Upon acquiring the throne, Teobaldo I was forced to negotiate with the Navarrese nobility and cities the legal limits to his own authority, and agreed to have customary laws codified, an undertaking that led to the first Fueros of Navarre, sanctioned in 1238. Taking advantage of the dynastic change, some time after 1234 the city of Tudela would have manipulated its own charter at several points so as to assert its rights and weaken royal authority, finally reaching a settlement with Teobaldo I in 1237 that largely confirmed the manipulated charter of Tudela. The chief manipulations concerned the claim that upon being granted, the citizens of Tudela had inherited the Fueros de Sobrarbe (which included, amongst other things, the right for the city to appoint its own Justicia to veto royal orders and assert its rights), and the tax exemptions and extensive territorial rights the charter supposedly granted to Tudela (amongst others, jurisdiction over Cervera and Gallipienzo quoted above).

Proofs of the fabrication include the confusing dating of the extant charter (later mentions suggest the charter was issued between 1119 and 1124, but the charter is postdated to 1117); that the original copy of the charter of Tudela is lost, and all extant physical copies are dated after 1234; the fact the charter uses the royal title Aldeffonsus, rex Aragonie et Nauarre ("Alfonso, king of Aragon and Navarre"), which only began to be used half a century after the reign of king Alfonso himself, during the reign of Sancho VII the Strong; and the fact that amongst the extensive territorial rights the charter supposedly granted Tudela there are certain townships that were still under Arab control in 1117, such as the towns of Cervera and Gallipienzo, and that others such as Corella and Cabanillas, known to have been coveted by the corporation of Tudela in the 1230s, were in fact granted their own independent charters in 1120 and 1124.

Other evidence regarding the fabricated status of the Fueros de Sobrarbe are the fueros (charters) of Alquézar (1075) and of Barbastro (1100). These two townships constitute territories that were conquered and repopulated by people from Sobrarbe itself by the then nascent crown of Aragon. However, both of their charters fail to mention the Fueros of Sobrarbe, which would have been unlikely given the medieval custom of newly established territories inheriting earlier charters. The collections of rights and privileges asserted in those charters are equally dissimilar to those allegedly asserted by the Fueros de Sobrarbe, although they do grant chartership to knights and infanzones. Other nearby city charters predating those of Tudela, such as the Fuero de Estella (dated between 1076 and 1084) or the Fuero de Jaca (1063 or 1076–1077), also fail to mention the Fueros de Sobrarbe. Finally, it appears unlikely that a charter such as the Fuero de Sobrarbe, allegedly issued in the 800s to what would have then been a small rural settlement, would grant its inhabitants rights and privileges befitting 13th-century nobility and cities.

The Tudela interpolation of the Fueros de Sobrarbe was inherited by many later medieval charters both in Navarre and in Aragon. The Fuero General de Navarra of 1238 already incorporated a mention to them in its prologue and title I, chapter I of the first book of charters. This introduction, likely based on that found in the contemporary Fueros de Tudela, describes a legendary Kingdom of Sobrarbe, combining contradictory elements, some of which could have been taken from the Liber regum. This seems to be the origin of three of the first four fueros of Sobrarbe. It is important because it builds the legend of laws before kings, describing how the fueros were written before the king was proclaimed.

It is in the context of asserting the rights of nobility and urban corporations that the Fueros of Sobrarbe begin to be mentioned in legal documents after the 13th century, when jurists and legal historians start to use them to justify the legitimacy that certain medieval institutions of Navarre and Aragon (the Justicia, the bailiffs, the regular gathering of their respective parliaments, ...) would be justified in accordance to the (by then) lost ancient Fueros of Sobrarbe.

=== Anachronisms in the Fueros ===
The traditional account of how the Fueros of Sobrarbe recounted above was more or less established by the 15th century. However, the account was full of inconsistencies and anachronisms that seemed difficult to conciliate. Chief amongst these: how could Don Pelayo have sanctioned the Fueros of a remote valley in the Pyrenees, hundreds of miles away from his own lands in Asturias, almost a century after his own death?

Likewise, the apostolic Aldebrano under whose advice the charters were said to have been drafted most likely refers to either of two obscure bishops of Tricastin (modern Saint-Paul-Trois-Châteaux), a minor diocesis in Occitania, the second of which was dead prior to 829.

In the mid 15th century, Gualberto Fabricio de Vagad, working with several historical documents largely drawn from De rebus Hispaniae and the Chronicle of San Juan de la Peña, reconstructed a less fanciful chronology with which to add a veneer of historical verisimilitude to the Fueros. According to Vagad's account, the early kings of Aragon and of Navarre were petty kings, reigning solely over the valley of Sobrarbe – thus the origins of both Navarre and Aragon would be grounded on the mythical Kingdom of Sobrarbe. In Vagad's version, the first true king of Aragon was Ramiro I (1007–1063), and the first king of Sobrarbe would have been García Jiménez (late 9th century), under whose reign Vagad claims the office of the Justicia was established. According to Vagad, when Iñigo Arista (c. 790 – 851) accepted the crown of Sobrarbe, he offered the right to rebellion if he violated the fueros, so as to signal his intention of ruling under the law. His successor García Jiménez avowed said right by establishing the office of the Justicia, which would have therefore existed as a safeguard against royal abuses of power since at least the 9th century. This explanation by Vagad, broadly accepted by Blancas, is problematic: Arista operated from Pamplona, and García Jiménez likely from Álava, not Sobrarbe. Furthermore, albeit the Fueros de Sobrarbe were indeed invoked in Navarre (the direct successor to Arista's kingdom of Pamplona) as well as in Aragon, Navarrese institutions were markedly different from the Aragonese ones and, in particular, Navarre lacked an office as powerful as the Justicia of Aragon, which appears to have been an Aragonese innovation.

Vagad's nevertheless appears to have succeeded in bringing the Fueros de Sobrarbe to the realm of the likely: Vagad had substituted Pelagius with Iñigo Arista, a more likely monarch active in the area of Sobrarbe, albeit the historical Arista was most likely already dead by the time the Fueros were issued, which is why Vagad associated them more strongly with his successor García Jiménez.

Carlos, Prince of Viana, heir to the crowns of Aragon and Navarre, wrote a Chronicle of the kings of Navarre in the middle of the 15th century, also based on the De rebus Hispaniae and the Chronicle of San Juan de la Peña. This chronicle remodels the founding myth of Navarre and Aragon in Sobrarbe found in other works such as Vagad's, naming Pope Hadrian instead of the apostolic Aldebrano, making the knights both Navarrese and Aragonese mountainfolk rather than Visigothic knights, and getting rid of Don Pelayo, putting Iñigo Arista in his place. This narrative was intended to resolve the anachronisms and contradictions of the original version, and officialised the constitutional origin of the Navarrese and Aragonese monarchies.

=== The Justicia of Aragon and the History of Martin Sagarra ===
According to the list of Justicias that appears in the Aragonensium rerum commentarii by Jerónimo Blancas, Martin Sagarra served as Justicia of Aragon after Fortún Ahe, who was appointed in 1275 or 1276, and before Pedro Martínez de Artasona, who was Justice in 1281. Blancas acknowledges that it is not known for sure when he was Justicia, but he affirms that if Sagarra did serve as such, he did so before Jimén Pérez de Salanova, who would have acceded to the post in 1294. Other authors doubt that Sagarra was a Justicia, and think that he was a jurist who might have been a lieutenant of the Justicia, and who lived decades later.

Martin Sagarra is identified as Justicia of Aragon in the Glossa de Observantis Regni Aragonum written by Johan Antich de Bages between 1450 and 1458, which is likely a source for Blancas. In this work, a meticulous compilation of Aragonese legal writings, Antich affirms that the office of Justice was created at the same time as that of the king, citing a work by Sagarra. According to Sagarra, Iñigo Arista was elected king on condition that he appointed a judge who could adjudicate between the king and his vassals, the king having to preserve the office in perpetuity and if he did not preserve it, the vassals could dethrone him and elect another king in his place, even if he was a pagan. Antich then says that this was the Privilege of the Union which had been abolished in 1348. This privilege imposed the intervention of the Justice in any case concerning the claimants of the privilege and allowed rebellion in case the king did not comply with the privileges. When the privilege was revoked, Peter IV ordered the destruction of all copies and forbade anyone to transcribe or possess them. However, at least one manuscript survived and ended up in the possession of Jerónimo Zurita, and later of Blancas himself. Ralph Giesey thought that Sagarra must have written his work after 1348, and that what he was describing was the Privilege of the Union, not some ancient fueros, but that the privilege codified what may have been an ancient oral tradition.

Later authors, such as Fabricio de Vagad, connected the two sources of the Fueros of Sobrarbe, adding the fueros described by Antich to the list contained in the Fuero de Tudela. Vagad describes the first Navarrese-Aragonese kings as kings only of Sobrarbe, until Ramiro I, who also appears as the first king of Aragon. In his version of history, the first king of Sobrarbe is García Jiménez and the first Justice already served during his reign. When Íñigo Arista accepts the crown, he offers the right to rebellion if he violates the fueros to show that he is going to reign according to the law.

The New Compilation of the Fueros y Observancias published in 1552 includes for the first time in its prologue a mention of the Fueros de Sobrarbe as the ancient fueros of the kingdom of Aragon, when it describes the early history of the kingdom in a manner similar to that of the Fuero de Tudela, but with Aragonese as the only protagonists and without mentioning names of kings. It also states that in Aragon first there were laws rather than kings. Something that the compilation does not do is to enumerate which were those first fueros.

=== The work of Jerónimo Blancas ===
Jerónimo Blancas compiled in 1578 a list of the Justices of Aragon he knew of, with the intention of writing a commentary on each of them. By 1583 the work, written in Latin, had grown considerably, Blancas calling it Commentarios in Fastos de Iustitiis Aragonum (Commentaries in Fastos on the Justices of Aragon). Blancas asked the Council of Aragon for permission to publish it, but was refused. However, the king Philip II of Spain overturned the council's refusal and allowed him to publish it, but on condition that he made certain changes. The Council thought that the work glorified too much the institution of the Justicia, and Blancas was forced to exclude the legendary oath of the kings of Aragon and the text of the Privilege of the Union. The work was finally published in 1587 under the name Aragonensium rerum Commentarii ("Commentaries on the things of Aragon"). At this time relations between the royal court and the Aragonese institutions were tense, with the rebellion in the county of Ribagorza and the rejection by the Aragonese of the growing power of the Inquisition and the Real Audiencia, a conflict that would lead a few years later to the Alteraciones de Aragón.

It is in this work that Blancas combines the two sources of the legendary Fueros de Sobrarbe. Blancas modifies the version of the founding myth created by Carlos de Viana, making the knights this time only Aragonese, and explicitly calls the original fueros Fueros de Sobrarbe. Blancas lists them as six separate fueros, adding a first fuero of his own invention, and translates them into Latin in the style of the Twelve Tables to give them more authority. He also minimises the role of the rich men, mentioning them only once and putting them on the same level as knights and infanzones. The publication of the Fueros de Sobrarbe by Blancas gave them a credibility that would take centuries to be questioned.

== Bibliography ==
- Blancas, Jerónimo (1878). Aragonensium rerum commentarii. Zaragoza, Impr. del Hospicio.
- Giesey, Ralph E. (1968). If not, not. The oath of the aragonese and the legendary laws of Sobrarbe. Princeton University Press.
- Lacarra de Miguel, José María; Vázquez de Parga, Luis; Sánchez Albornoz, Claudio (1987). "Fuero de Tudela: transcripción con arreglo al ms. 11-2-6, 406 de la Academia de la Historia de Madrid". Revista Jurídica de Navarra. 4: 21–73.
- Ramos y Loscertales, José María (1981) [1947]. "Los Fueros de Sobrarbe" (PDF). Archivo de Filología Aragonesa. Vol. 28–29. Institución Fernando el Católico. pp. 225–254.
- Zurita, Jerónimo (1562). Anales de la Corona de Aragón. Institución Fernando el Católico. ISBN 84-85303-23-7.
