= Alterations of Aragon =

Events in Aragon during the reign of Felipe II

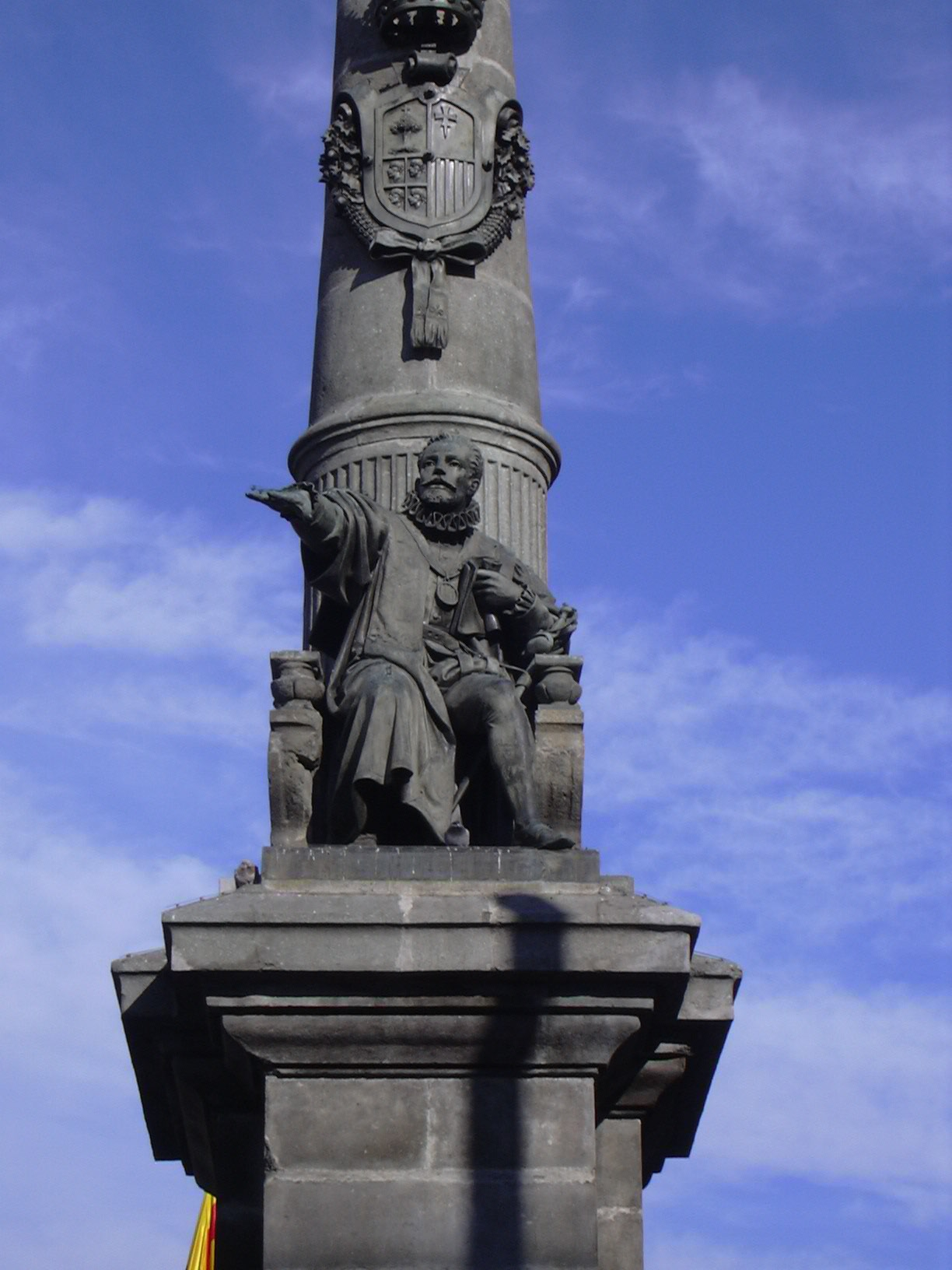
Statue of Juan V de Lanuza in the monument to the justice system in Zaragoza.

The events occurred in Aragon during the reign of Philip II are known as the Alterations of Aragon. The Kingdom of Aragon remained quiet during the first half of the 16th century, while the War of the Communities in Castile and the Germanies in Valencia were in progress.

== Background ==
Since the establishment of the Inquisition in 1478 by the Catholic Monarchs, and with the progressive authoritarianism being developed in the government of Philip II, son of Charles I, the Alterations of Teruel and Albarracín took place, due to the constant counter-guerrillas committed by both the representatives of King Philip II and the inquisitors of Teruel.

The constant quarrels and disagreements with the king led to the siege of the city of Teruel by an imperial army under the command of the Duke of Segorbe. Finally, after several days of fighting, the town surrendered on the night of Maundy Thursday 1572, and the ringleaders of the revolt were executed in the Plaza de San Juan in the following days.

To a situation already deteriorated in Aragon by the problems in the county of Ribagorza, the despotic treatment of the vassals by their lords and the repression of their revolts in the alterations of Ariza, Ayerbe and Monclús, the protests against the abuse of the Privilege of the Twenty by Zaragoza, the violent confrontations between highlanders and moriscos and by the lawsuit of the foreign viceroy, in April 1590 and aided by his wife, Antonio Pérez, entered Aragon. Antonio Pérez had held the post of secretary to the king until 1579, when he was arrested for the murder of Escobedo —a trusted man of Juan de Austria— and for abusing the royal trust by conspiring against the king.

After escaping from prison in Madrid, he fled to Zaragoza, where he sought the protection of the Aragonese privileges and was granted the Privilege of Manifestation - protection from Aragonese justice. In Aragon he found the support of Fernando de Gurrea y Aragón Duke of Villahermosa (whose domains in Ribagorza would be expropriated), and Luis Ximénez de Urrea IV Count of Aranda, and mainly Diego de Heredia (of the lower nobility). Philip II, distrustful that the Aragonese courts would condemn Antonio Pérez, desisted from continuing the ordinary lawsuit against him and used a court against which the Aragonese fueros and Aragonese Justice could not oppose: the Inquisition. Antonio Pérez was accused of heresy for having blasphemed when he complained to those close to him about his persecution.

== The events of May 24, 1591 ==
On May 24, 1591, at the request of the inquisitors and by order of the Justice Juan de Lanuza y Perellós, Antonio Pérez was transferred to the prison that the Inquisition had in the Aljafería. After this, Heredia and his followers attacked and mortally wounded Íñigo López de Mendoza y Manrique de Luna Marquis of Almenara, representative of the King in the lawsuit of the foreign viceroy, after his servants were disarmed by the Justice. Then they went to the Aljafería and, after violence and threats, they managed to get Pérez returned to the prison of the demonstrators. The inquisitors of Zaragoza published an edict recalling the serious penalties that could be imposed on those who mistreated the ministers of the Holy Office, and the rioters responded with new threats.

When Philip II received news of the riot and of the later death of Almenara, he ordered that the forces that were preparing to support the Catholic League in the War of the three Enriques in France were to concentrate in the strong square of Ágreda, near the border with Aragon. After being consulted by his advisers, the King wrote a missive to the universities and towns of Aragon, describing to them the tumult of Zaragoza and asking them for calm and obedience to what the viceroy ordered. The cities, towns and communities responded condemning the riot and asking for the punishment of its promoters, which isolated Zaragoza, where all the rioters seemed to have gathered. The Deputation consulted a board of lawyers to determine if there had been any counterfeit in the delivery of Pérez to the Inquisition, to which the board responded that there had not been, so that the restitution of Pérez to the prison of the Holy Office was prepared. The rioters again responded with threats and violence, making it impossible to carry out what the Deputation had ordered. The Deputation, instead of imposing its authority, sent the General Inquisitor a letter questioning the veracity of the witnesses against Pérez, and insinuating that they had been bribed by the late Marquis of Almenara and the Inquisitor Alonso Molina de Medrano to testify falsely. Seeing how his case was evolving, Pérez tried to escape from the prison of the accused and, discovered, the justice ordered his transfer to a safer and better guarded prison.

== The events of September 24, 1591 ==
After much discussion and great preparations, the Aragonese authorities arranged that the transfer of Antonio Pérez to the prison of the Inquisition would take place on September 24, but two days earlier the justice Juan de Lanuza y Perellós died and, in accordance with the king's advance arrangements, he was succeeded in the position by his son Juan de Lanuza y Urrea, only twenty-six years old. On the planned day, the governor ordered the closing of the city gates and distributed armed guards along the route between the two prisons. The tension in the city was very high, and the decision to close the gates left the farmers who would otherwise have gone out to work in the fields idle in the city. The governor threatened to kill anyone who gave the slightest hint of opposing justice, and a young man who shouted "Long live liberty" was shot dead by one of the arquebusiers, after which the supporters of Perez rang the bell of the church of San Pablo.

With great formality, the inquisitor presented the letters of complaint of the defendants to the new justice, who with his lieutenants studied them and declared them to be in accordance with the law. The deputies of the kingdom, the jurors of Zaragoza, a lieutenant of the justice and the governor went to the Viceroy's inn, where a large number of nobles were present. The viceroy approved the agreement and they all went to the prison of the manifested to proceed with the transfer. Summoned by the chimes, a crowd had accumulated in front of the jail where Antonio Pérez was imprisoned. When the cars of the Inquisition approached, supporters of Perez attacked the guards, some of whom joined the rebels and others fled, and the authorities also fled. The crowd, which had already set fire to the house where the governor took refuge, threatened to do the same with the jail, and the jailers let Antonio Pérez out. Pérez and some of his supporters went to the door of Santa Engracia, which the rioters opened, allowing Pérez and his companions to leave the city in the direction of France. More than thirty people died in the riots, with many more wounded. After Pérez fled the city, and through the mediation of the clergy, the riots calmed down.

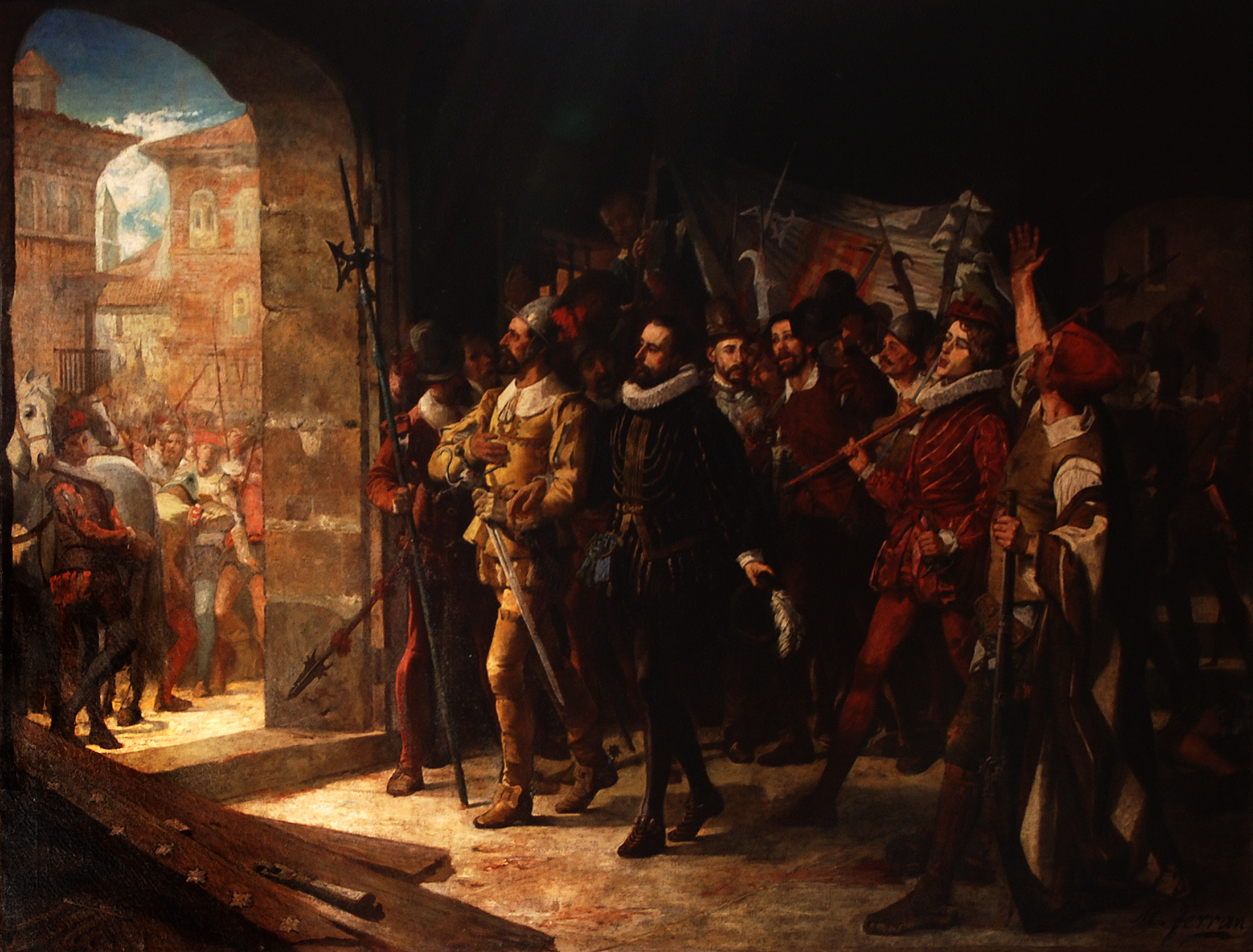
Antonio Perez was released from prison on September 24, 1591.

When the news of what happened in Zaragoza reached the royal court, Philip II ordered the meeting of a Board of State that decided to reinforce the border with France to prevent the French from coming to the support of the rebels and to try to apprehend the fugitive. It was also ordered that the Aragonese authorities protect or destroy the weapons in their charge, so that they would not fall into the hands of the rioters. Antonio Pérez, having cut off his access to France, decided to return to Zaragoza secretly, where he was in contact with the leaders of the rebels, inciting them to believe that the royal army was going to enter Aragon to repeal their charters. The authorities of Aragon disregarded the royal order and gave arms to the insurgents, who took control of Zaragoza. The King then decided to send in his army to reestablish the authority of justice and the Holy Office. On October 15, the King sent a letter to the cities, universities and lords of Aragon announcing the entry of the army and the reason for its entry.

== Entry of the royal army into Aragon ==
The news that the royal army was going to enter Aragon shocked the whole kingdom. The supporters of Pérez demanded that the deputies declare their entry against the line and order armed resistance against them. The deputies consulted a board of lawyers who ruled that the entry of foreign armed forces to impose justice violated the second charter of the General Privilege, which stated:

As some officials of some cities, towns or places of the kingdom of Valencia, Principality of Catalonia, wrongfully pretend, that by virtue of privileges and with color of processes of defense and of sonmetient and in other ways, they can with the company of armed people enter the said kingdom following evildoers and those to arrest and other acts and executions do ... we order that any officials or foreign persons ... shall enter the said kingdom ... by ... do any of the aforementioned acts ... that ipso facto they shall incur the penalty of death ... And no less than the Justice of Aragon with the deputies of the said kingdom ... have summoned at the expense of the kingdom the people of the said kingdom, who will seem necessary to resist the aforementioned things by armed force....

The Deputation approved the opinion and passed it on to the justice so that he could study the case and decide whether or not it was a contrafuero. The justice, backed by four of his five lieutenants, confirmed the contrafuero and ordered the resistance to the royal troops, with which the foral authorities of the kingdom formally declared war on their King. The declaration was published on the first of November and was communicated to the consistories and lords of Aragon, who were ordered to send forces to Zaragoza to participate in the defense, expecting a force of some twenty-four thousand armed men, more numerous than that of the royal army. Help was also requested from the principality of Catalonia and the Kingdom of Valencia. The king rejected the arguments presented, saying that the army was not entering to impose a foreign jurisdiction, but to support the civil and ecclesiastical authorities of Aragon so that they could reestablish their authority and jurisdiction. The deputies confirmed what they had decided, so the king ordered his general, Alonso de Vargas, to prepare to enter Aragon with his army.

In Zaragoza the opinion seemed unanimous in favor of resistance, at least while the supporters of Perez remained in the city, but in the rest of Aragon it was viewed with distrust that the same people who had not supported the decisions of the Justice to return Perez to the Inquisition now asked to support the Justice against the king. Some consistories sent forces to Zaragoza, but they were much smaller than expected. Most of the cities and universities replied to the Justicia with a joint letter telling him that they were not going to resist the king in order to protect the breakers of their own laws. Nor did the lords of vassals outside Zaragoza respond to the mobilization, some even helped the royal army with supplies and armed people. The Diputations of Catalonia and Valencia did not send reinforcements either. The Catalans tried to intercede with the king so that he would not let the army enter, but without success.

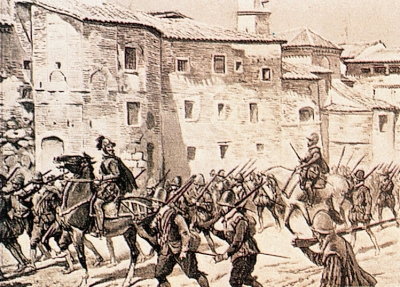
Royal troops entering Zaragoza.

The justice named as captains of his force the supporters of Pérez, the same ones that had mutinied before against the dispositions of the justice concerning Pérez. The royal army entered Aragon on November 7 and 8, and had twelve thousand infantry, two thousand cavalry and twenty-five pieces of artillery. The force at the disposal of the Justice, who left Zaragoza on November 8, was barely two thousand men, much inferior in number, experience and equipment to the royal force. The royal army advanced without any opposition and received the support and help of the local lords. Alonso de Vargas was careful to maintain the discipline of his army and avoid outrages, in accordance with the instructions he had received from the king. The Justice had ordered the destruction of the bridge of Alagón over the Jalón, to hinder the advance of the royal forces, but his orders were ignored and the royal army found the bridge undefended and intact. The justice and his forces were in Utebo and when the justice learned that the royal troops were already heading unimpeded to Zaragoza, knowing that his force was much inferior and also very undisciplined, he decided to abandon his troops and flee to Épila, where the Duke of Villahermosa and the Count of Aranda were. Upon hearing the news in the camp of Utebo, the troops were dispersed in all directions, fleeing Antonio Perez and his main supporters to Bearn (France). Alonso de Vargas, the viceroy and governor of Aragon and the royal army entered Zaragoza unopposed on November 12, 1591.

== Repression ==
The followers of Pérez tried to pass back to Aragon with the support of Henry de Navarra, but they were repulsed and some of their leaders, including Heredia, captured and executed. Juan V de Lanuza returned to Zaragoza, where he was captured and beheaded overnight by personal order of Philip II in the market square without trial, the same fate that befell many of those who led the revolt. Fernando de Gurrea y Aragón, Duke of Villahermosa and the Count of Aranda were captured in Épila and sent to Castile, where they died mysteriously in prison. Pérez escaped to France and later to England, places where he stimulated the black legend against the monarch and died in 1611.

== Agreement with the Aragonese Courts ==
In 1592 Philip II convened the Courts of Aragon in Tarazona. No Aragonese institutions were abolished, but they were reformed: the king now had the right to appoint a non-Aragonese viceroy; the Deputation of the Kingdom (committee of the Courts) lost part of its control over Aragonese revenues and regional surveillance, also removing its power to call representatives of the cities; the Crown could remove the justice of Aragon from his post and the Court of Justice was placed under the king's control; and finally aspects of the Aragonese legal system were modified. In December 1593, after the conclusion of the Courts, Philip II's troops were withdrawn from Aragon.

Most historians agree that the agreement at the Courts of Tarazona was a compromise between the nobles and the King. The nobles preferred to accept the authority of the King as guarantor of their privileges, even if they ceded power in the fueros. It is also agreed that Philip II was in a position to have put an end to the fueros and create a centralized structure (he had an army and the rebels were alone with limited support in Aragon and without the desired support from Catalonia or Valencia). But it did not happen, and the causes are several: Philip II, in spite of being an absolute monarch, was not totally at ease reigning through viceroys and Councils. A centralizing attempt would have required the abolition of the fueros in Catalonia and Valencia, which did not give him reason to do so, since they were loyal to the king during the revolt. The components of the crown of Aragon were going through a moment of already long economic depression and his Courts normally granted him the requested credits, besides he conserved the greatest power in the richest parts of the kingdom: Castile and America. But he did not miss the opportunity to erode some powers of the Aragonese nobility in his favor by limiting the fueros.

== See also ==
- Cortes of Tarazona (1592)
- Diputación del General del Reino de Aragón
- Justicia de Aragón
