= Juan de Lanuza y Urrea =

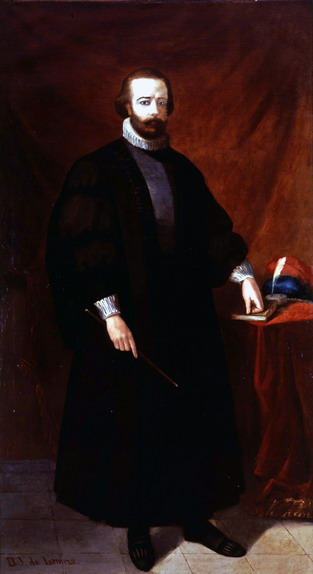
19th century painting of Juan de Lanuza y Urrea.

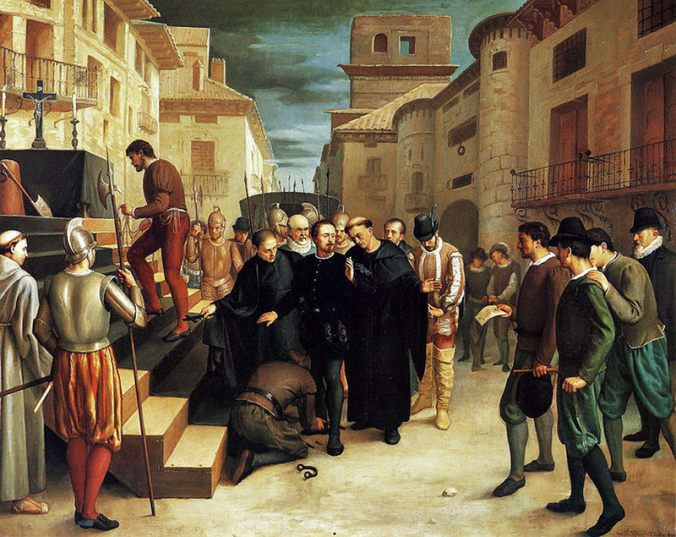
19th century painting of the last moments of Juan de Lanuza.

Juan de Lanuza y Urrea (the Younger) (1564 – Zaragoza, 20 December 1591) was a Justice of Aragon, who was executed by order of King Philip II of Spain.

== Biography ==
He was the son of Justice of Aragon Juan de Lanuza y Perellós (or Espés) (the Elder) and Catalina Jiménez de Urrea. He succeeded his father, who died on 22 September 1591, in the office of Justice of Aragon. Lanuza the Younger would be the last of his lineage to hold such an important magistracy, which was in practice hereditarily.

He was immediately involved in the Alterations of Aragon, which already started in April 1590 when Antonio Pérez sought protection in Aragon from King Philip II of Spain by invoking the ancient Privileges of Aragon. But King Philip circumvented these Privileges by accusing Antonio Pérez of heresy, which made him liable to be trialed by the Spanish Inquisition.

Two days after assuming office, Juan Lanuza the Younger was to hand over Antonio Pérez to the Inquisition. During his transfer to the Inquisition prison, a serious riot broke out, involving members of the nobility, the clergy, and people from the lower classes of Zaragoza and Pérez was freed. The rioters were against the power of the Inquisition and the absolutism of the Monarchy.

Faced with this situation, Philip II's troops, which had been preparing for some time, crossed the border and marched on Zaragoza. Lanuza the Younger declared that the incursion of the Castilian troops was contrary to the Fueros (charters of rights and privileges) of Aragon. The deputies of Aragon contacted the Diputación (parliament) of Catalonia and Valencia, but they did not support them. Likewise, most Aragonese municipalities initially adopted an expectant position, and later distanced themselves from the position of Zaragoza.

Dissension soon arose among the nobles leading the revolt, and several fled. Determined to protect the ancient Privileges of Aragon, Juan Lanuza the Younger marched at the head of a poorly trained group of men to stop the Royal troops, but they soon scattered. Philip II's army entered Zaragoza a few days later without encountering resistance, and arrested Lanuza. On 20 December 1591, without trial, the Chief Justice was beheaded.

The execution of Lanuza was a turning point in the history of Aragon. Medieval rights were scaled back in the Cortes of Tarazona (1592), and central Spanish authority and the Inquisition became prominent.

== Commemoration ==
His execution led the city of Zaragoza to erect a monument in 1904 in the Plaza de Aragón in commemoration of the Justiciazgo (Justice of Aragon) and the Rights and Freedoms of Aragon. Furthermore, in the Central Market of Zaragoza, where Juan de Lanuza was executed, there is a plaque in his honor for the 400th anniversary of his death, placed on 20 December 1991.

The Cortes of Aragon decided in 1985 that 20 December would be celebrated as the Day of the Rights and Freedoms of the Aragonese People.

== Links ==
- 40 Illustrous people of Aragon
