= Cortes of Tarazona (1592) =

Court of the Kingdom of Aragon summoned by Philip II of Spain in 1592

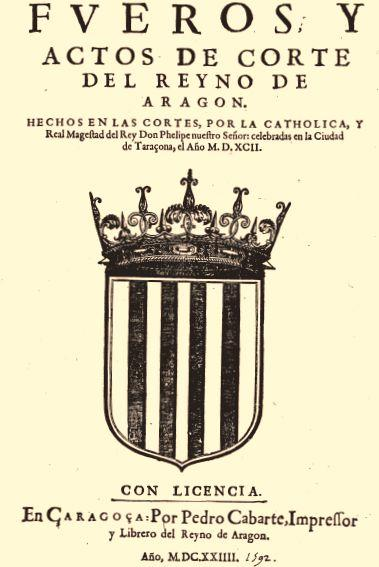
First page of the Fueros and Acts of the Cortes of the Kingdom of Aragon, held in Tarazona in 1592.

The Cortes of Tarazona of 1592 were the Cortes of the Kingdom of Aragon summoned by Philip II, being the first Aragonese courts held after the royal army intervened to quell the alterations of Aragon. The Cortes began on June 15, 1592, and closed on December 2, 1592.

== Background ==
These courts were held after the confrontations in Zaragoza between the supporters of Antonio Pérez on one side, and the Aragonese institutions and the Holy Office on the other, which led to the king's decision to enter an army into Aragon to restore order, the flight of Antonio Pérez, and the assassination of the royal representative in the lawsuit of the foreign viceroy: Íñigo López de Mendoza y Manrique de Luna, the 1st Marquis of Almenara. The Diputación and the Justicia de Aragón decided to resist the royal army, but the lack of support outside of Zaragoza made the rebels give up and the royal army entered Aragon and Zaragoza without encountering any resistance.
The king had the Justicia Juan de Lanuza y Urrea and other leaders of the uprising executed and imprisoned others who had supported the mutineers, such as Fernando de Gurrea y Aragón, 5th Duke of Villahermosa and the Count of Aranda. The royal army remained stationed in various locations in Aragon during the celebration of these courts.

== Inauguration ==
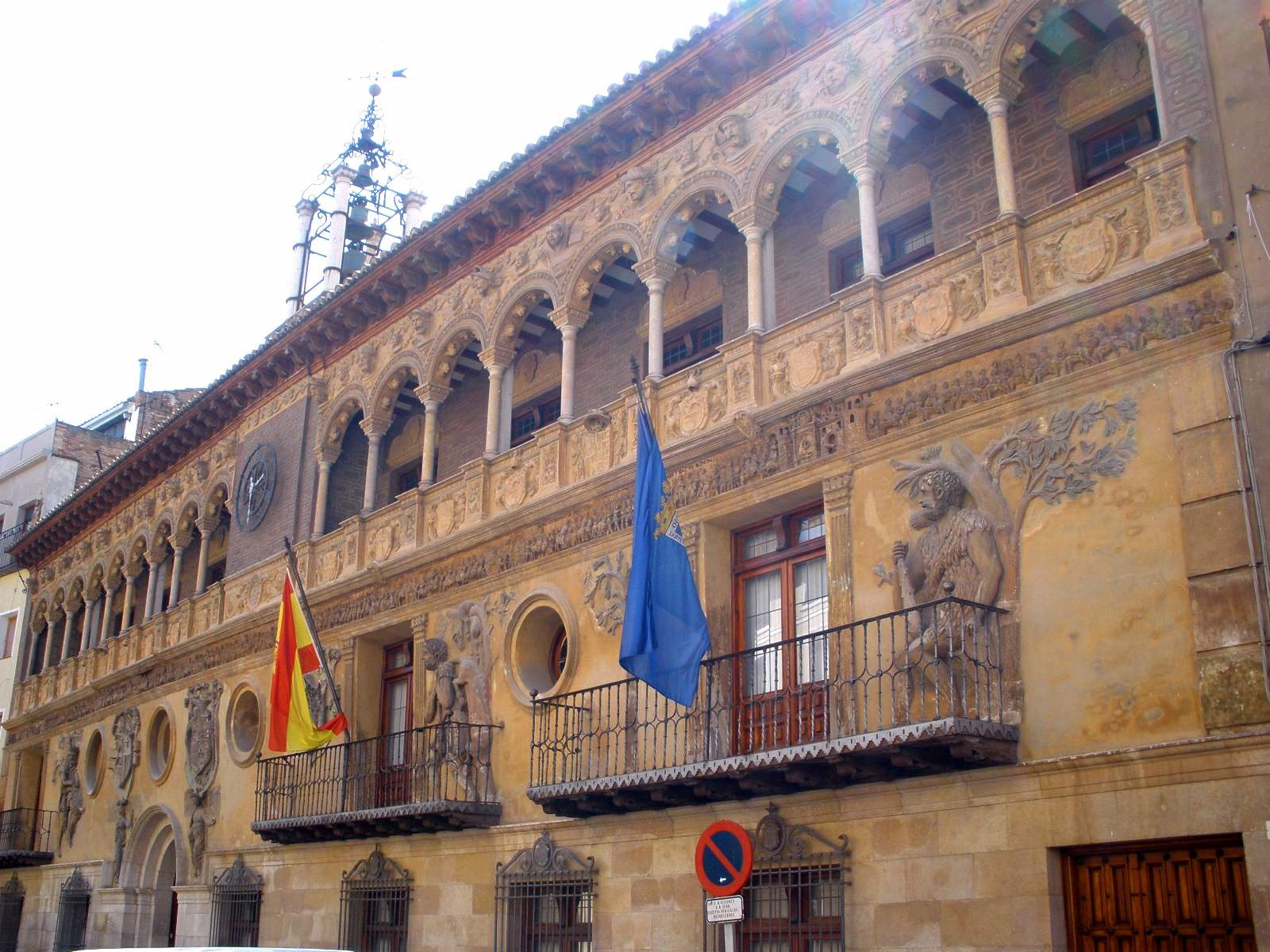
Consistory and market of Tarazona, site of the inaugural session of the Cortes.

The cortes were summoned by cedula issued in Madrid on April 6, 1592, to begin on May 9 in Tarazona, the Aragonese city closest to the border with Castile. The king requested that, due to his other responsibilities and his state of health, the Cortes be allowed to be inaugurated and presided over by the Archbishop of Zaragoza, Andrés de Cabrera y Bobadilla, promising to attend to their closure. After negotiating with the arms, the proposal was accepted and the cortes could be inaugurated on June 15, with the bishop of Huesca making the response to the royal proposal, instead of the archbishop of Zaragoza as was the custom. The important role of Justice, vacant since the execution of Juan de Lanuza y Urrea, was carried out by the regent of the office of Justice, Martín Bautista de Lanuza, who would later be appointed by the king as president of the Supreme Council of the Crown of Aragon and by his successor as Justice of Aragon. The archbishop of Zaragoza died on August 25, after which the regent of the Supreme Council of Aragon was empowered to hold the solio of approval of the charter authorizing the making of decisions by a majority of the arms.

== Main agreements ==
The main decisions taken by these courts were:

- Formalize that, with certain exceptions, the decisions of the Cortes could be approved by a majority of each arm, without requiring unanimity, as had been done in previous Cortes. Among the exceptions requiring unanimity were the prohibition of the torture of aforados and the imposition of new taxes. This rule was formally approved by a separate solio at the beginning of the Cortes to allow the rest of the decisions to be made by majority vote.
- Allowing the king to appoint a viceroy to whom he wished until the next Cortes, ending the lawsuit of the foreign viceroy.
- To make explicit the power of the king to dismiss the Justicia, ending his supposed lifetime characteristic.
- Allowing royal officers to enter manorial lands to pursue and capture criminals.
- Transferring the powers of preserving public order from the Diputación to the Audiencia Real.
- Impose the obligation to obtain a license before printing books or other publications.

The arms also asked the king to withdraw his army from Aragon and granted him a service of 700,000 Jaquesan pounds.

== Closure ==
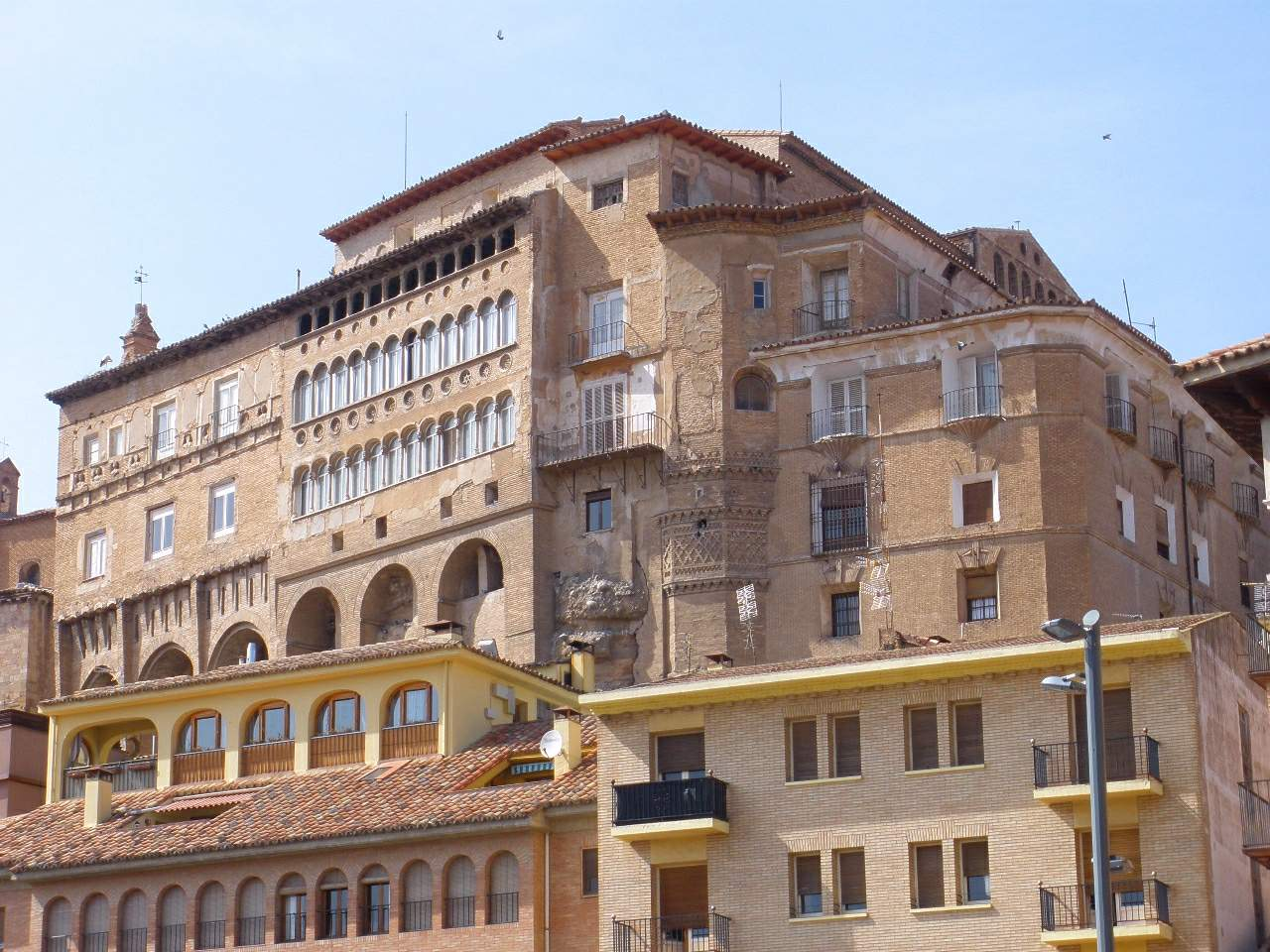
The episcopal palace of Tarazona, residence of the king during his stay in the city.

The king arrived in Tarazona on November 30, after the main culprits of the disturbances had been executed and the Count of Aranda and the Marquis Villahermosa had died in prison. His first disposition was to name Juan Campi as Justice of Aragon, who was the regent of the Supreme Council of Aragon and who would die a few days later, and the king later named Urbano Jiménez de Aragues. He also granted a general pardon to all those who were then imprisoned or indicted in Aragon for the disturbances, with the exception of the lieutenants of the Justice and lawyers who supported the resistance to the royal army, who were banished, and two more condemned. On December 2, Prince Felipe was sworn in as crown prince of Aragon and the king sanctioned the approved fueros, closing the courts.

The royal army, except for the garrisons of the Citadel of Jaca and the Aljafería of Zaragoza, left Aragon the following year, after the Moors were disarmed, with some units going to Italy, others to Roussillon and others returning to Castile.

Predecessor Cortes of Monzón (1585)	1592 Cortes of the Kingdom of Aragon	Successor: Cortes of Barbastro (1626)

== Bibliography ==
- Argensola, Lupercio Leonardo (1604). Información de los sucesos del reino de Aragón en los años de 1590 y 1591 (in Spanish). Imprenta Real.
- González Antón, Luis (1978). Las Cortes de Aragón (in Spanish). Librería General. ISBN 84-7078-076-X.
- Pidal, Pedro José (1863). Historia de las alteraciones de Aragón en el reinado de Felipe II (in Spanish). J. Martín Alegría, Juan Francisco Camacho, Fernando de Castro. Imp. de J. Martín Alegría. (Volume I, Volume II, Volume III)
- de Robles, Lorenzo (1593). Fueros y actos de corte del reyno de Aragón ... celebradas en la ciudad de Tarazona el año M.D.XCII (in Spanish).
