= Juan de Lanuza y Garabito =

Spanish noble

Juan de Lanuza y Garabito (died 1498) was a Spanish noble from the 15th century.

== Biography ==
He was the youngest of the 3 sons of Ferrer de Lanuza I, 1st Sieur of Azaila, Cosculluela, Escuer, Arguisal and Esun de Basa. Juan's mother was Inés de Garabito y Lanuza, his brothers were Martin, Sieur of Plasencia and Bardallur and Ferrer, Sieur of Azaila and Cosculluela. His sister was Dianira, who married Pedro de Luna, Sieur of Illueca.

Juan was the Sieur of Escuer, Arguisal and Essun de Basa.
He was Justice of Aragon from 1479 until 1498.
He was also Viceroy of Valencia (1492-93), then Viceroy of Catalonia (1493-95), and Viceroy of Sicily (1495-98).

He married Beatriz de Pimentel.
His eldest son was Juan de Lanuza y Pimentel (died in Naples, Italy, 1507), Viceroy of Sicily.

== Links ==
- Libro de Armoria
