= Justicia de Aragón =

Public office in the Kingdom of Aragon

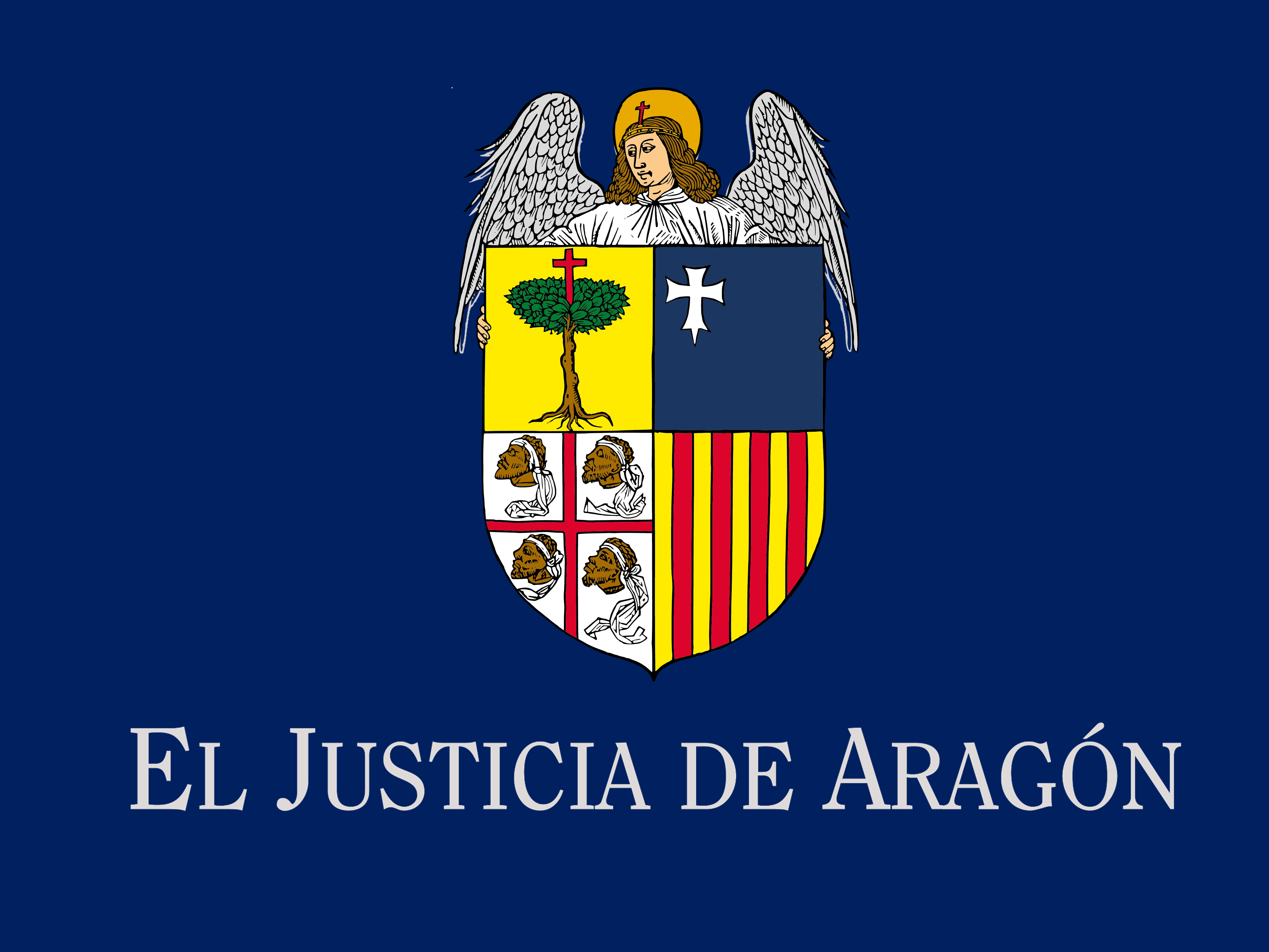
Coat of arms of the office of the Justicia.

The Justicia de Aragón (Spanish pronunciation: [xusˈtiθja ðe aɾaˈɣon]; Aragonese: Chusticia d'Aragón; Catalan: Justícia d'Aragó; lit.Justice of Aragon) is the name of an important public office that existed in the Kingdom of Aragon from the beginning of at least the 12th century until 1711, and again from 1982 onwards.

The Justicia was the most prestigious and powerful office of the Kingdom of Aragon aside from the kingship itself. The task of the incumbent was to ensure that the laid down rights (Fueros) and the customary law of the land were observed. The Justicia had extensive judicial and executive powers, and acted as a zealous counterbalance to royal authority within the Crown of Aragon. The Justicia was also speaker of the yearly meeting of the Cortes de Aragon (the Aragonese parliament), was charged with the swearing-in of new monarchs, and could veto any action by any official (including the king himself) if the Justicia deemed it to be against the Fueros of Aragon. The office was abolished in 1711 when the Nueva Planta Decrees unified the Spanish monarchy, but was reinstated in 1982 with the passing of the Statute of Autonomy of the Autonomous Community of Aragon of 1982. Its modern duties are those of a regional ombudsman.

== History ==
Coats of arms of the office of the Justicia.

=== Origins of the Office ===
Since at least the 15th century, the origins of the office of the Justicia have been used to explain why royal authority in Aragon was so tightly bound by a set of legal traditions that the Justicia was charged with overseeing. Broadly speaking, there were two largely compatible theories regarding the origins of the office of the Justicia, both of which placed its origins at the onset of the kingdom of Aragon itself.

==== Iñigo Arista and the first Justicia ====
The first theory can be traced back to the scholarly work of Martin Sagarra. Sagarra is believed to have been a legal scholar active either in the 1270s or in the 1340s. In his Glossa de Observantis Regni Aragonum (written in 1450–1458), the legal historian Johan Antich de Bages claims Martin Sagarra himself had been Justicia sometime between Fortún Ahe, said to have held the office either in 1275 or 1276, and Pedro Martínez de Artasona, who is known to have served as Justicia in the Cortes of Aragon held in 1281. As a legal scholar, Martin Sagarra apparently penned a historical account of the office of the Justicia which Antich de Bages quotes from liberally. This work by Sagarra is now lost, but it apparently claimed that the office of the Justicia had been created at the same time as the kingship itself. Sagarra traced back the office of the Justicia to the reign of Iñigo Arista (c. 790–851), who according to him had only accepted his election as king of Pamplona under the condition that a judge be elected to adjudicate any disputes that may arise between the king and his subjects. This judge would be the original Justicia. Furthermore, according to Sagarra, Arista promised the king would never abolish the office of the Justicia, and that if any monarch did so, its vassals had the right to depose him and elect a new king, even if the latter were a pagan. Antich de Bages then elaborates that this ancient right was abolished in the Privilege of the Union of 1347 (a charter negotiated by Peter IV of Aragon). According to Antich de Bages, this privilege allowed royal subjects to rebel if the king violated the charters and customs of Aragon and, for this reason, Peter IV had ordered all traces of it be destroyed. In fact, Peter IV himself is famously said to have torn a copy of these ancient charters with his own dagger once the Privilege of the Union of 1347 was passed. It is for this reason that Ralph Giesey believed that Sagarra must have written his work after 1348, and that what he was describing was not some ancient rights, but the customary law of his time, which had been just been codified and modified by the Privilege of the Union of 1347. However, at least one copy of these ancient charters survived, which was studied first by Gualberto Fabricio de Vagad (active in the 1450s) and ended up in the hands of legal scholar Jerónimo Blancas in the 16th century, and was eventually rediscovered in the 19th century.

==== The legendary Fueros de Sobrarbe as a legal basis ====
The second theory regarding the origin of the office of the Justicia was first spelt out by Gualberto Fabricio de Vagad (active in the 15th century), who linked the Justicia to the fabled Fueros de Sobrarbe (Charters of Sobrarbe), a legendary compilation of legal traditions linked to the Sobrarbe, a valley in the Pyrenees that was the starting point from which the Aragonese monarchy began its expansion against the Arabs in the 11th century. The Fueros of Sobrarbe allegedly predated by several centuries the formal establishment in 1035 of the Kingdom of Aragon itself, and Vagad and Jerónimo Blancas used the Fueros to justify the extensive authority of the office of the Justicia, and the existence of many of the Aragonese institutions.

It is generally believed that neither the Kingdom of Sobrarbe nor its legendary Fueros ever existed, and that at best they were used in subsequent centuries to justify customary law and medieval institutions, and at worst they were blatant fabrications. The cartulary of the Fueros de Sobrarbe themselves, if there ever was one, was already lost by the time they began to be used to justify certain limitations to royal authority, but the Fueros themselves gave legal grounds to force the monarch of Aragon (and in parallel, the king of Navarre) to grant the nobility and cities of its territory vast freedoms, including legal rights and tax and military exemptions. The specific contents of the Fueros weren't even spelt out clearly until the 1580s, when Jerónimo Blancas elaborated a set of six charters in latin, but for centuries before this, the Fueros had used to justify the subordination of the aragonese crown to the laws of the land ("laws before kings"), the right of Aragonese freemen to ignore or "rebel" against royal orders deemed illegal either by the recipient himself or, once the institution was firmly established, by the Justicia, thereby enshrining a pervasive legal principle in most of the Iberian peninsula, including the crowns of Navarre and, to some extent, of Castile. This also granted certain tax exemptions and to refuse to partake in wars taking place outside the crown of Aragon's own territories. It is in this context of asserting the rights of nobility and urban corporations that the Fueros of Sobrarbe begin to be mentioned in legal documents after the 13th century, when jurists and legal historians start to use them to justify the legitimacy that certain medieval institutions of Navarre and Aragon (the Justicia, the beyle, the regular gathering of their respective parliaments,...) would be grounded in the (by then) ancient Fueros of Sobrarbe.

All historical mentions to the Fueros de Sobrarbe prior to the 1200s are subsequent fabrications, likely stemming from a late 1230s manipulation of the city charter of Tudela, originally issued c.1120 but manipulated in the 1230s. During the reign of Sancho VII the Strong (1157-1234), the city of Tudela in Navarre had seen its territory dwindle in favour of the king, who resided in the city, and the corporation of the city had also seen many new taxes levied to fund Sancho VII's campaigns and court. At the death of king Sancho VII, the throne of Navarre was inherited by his nephew Teobaldo I (1201-1253) of the House of Champagne. Taking advantage of the dynastic change, some time after 1234 the city of Tudela would have manipulated its own charter at several points so as to assert its rights and weaken royal authority. Because the new monarch lacked a firm power base in his new kingdom and was more focused on defending the regency of queen Blanche of France than on his Navarrese affairs, Teobaldo I agreed to quickly settle all disputes between the crown and cities of Navarra, and in 1237 confirmed the (now) manipulated charter of Tudela. The chief manipulations concerned the claim that upon being granted, the charter of Tudela had inherited the Fueros de Sobrarbe (which included, amongst other things, the right for the city to appoint its own Justicia to veto royal orders and assert its rights), and the tax exemptions and extensive territorial rights the charter supposedly granted to Tudela.

Proofs of the fabrication include the fact that the original 1119-1124 charter of Tudela is lost, and all extant copies are dated after 1234; the fact that the charter is postdated to 1117 (the year Tudela was conquered from the Arabs), but that subsequent mentions suggest the original charter could only have been granted between 1119 and 1124; the fact the charter uses the royal title Aldeffonsus, rex Aragonie et Nauarre ("Alfonso, king of Aragon and Navarre"), which only began to be used half a century after the reign of king Alfonso himself, in fact during the reign of Sancho VII the Strong; and the fact that amongst the extensive territorial rights the charter supposedly granted Tudela there are certain towns and valleys that were still under Arab control in 1117, such as the towns Corella and Cabanillas, the latter of which were in fact granted their own independent charters in 1120 and 1124.

Other evidence regarding the fabricated status of the Fueros de Sobrarbe are the fueros (charters) of Alquézar (1075) and of Barbastro (1100). These two townships constitute the first territories that were conquered and repopulated by people from Sobrarbe itself by the then nascent crown of Aragon. However, both of their charters fail to mention the Fueros of Sobrarbe, which would have been unlikely given the medieval custom of newly established territories inheriting earlier charters, and their collections of rights and privileges are dissimilar to those allegedly asserted by the Fueros de Sobrarbe. Other city charters contemporary to those of Tudela, such as the Fuero de Estella (dated between 1076 and 1084), also fail to mention the Fueros de Sobrarbe. Finally, it appears unlikely that a charter such as the Fuero de Sobrarbe, allegedly issued in the 800s to what would have then been a small rural settlement, would grant its inhabitants rights and privileges better suited to 13th century nobility and cities.

The Tudela interpolation of the Fueros de Sobrarbe was inherited by many later medieval charters both in Navarre and in Aragon. The Fuero General de Navarra of 1238 already incorporated a mention to them, and later on they appeared in the Fueros of many cities and settlements in Aragon. Eventually, it became customary to invoke them to justify the existence of all local and regional institutions that safeguarded nobility and city against royal abuses of power.

According to Vagad, the Fueros de Sobrarbe charged the office of the Justicia with adjudicating any disputes between the king and his subjects. Vagad offered a problematic description of the history of the office. According to him, the early kings of Aragon and of Navarre were but petty kings, reigning solely over the valley of Sobrarbe. In Vagad's version, the first true king of Aragon was Ramiro I (1007-1063), and the first king of Sobrarbe would have been García Jiménez (9th century), under whose reign Vagad claims the office of the Justicia was established. According to Vagad, when Iñigo Arista (c. 790–851) accepted the crown of Pamplona, he offered the right to rebellion if he violated the fueros so as to show his intention of ruling under the law, and his successor García Jiménez avowed said right by establishing the office of the Justicia, which would have therefore existed as a safeguard against royal abuses of power since at least the 9th century. This explanation by Vagad, broadly accepted by Blancas, is problematic: Arista operated from Pamplona, and García Jiménez likely from Álava, not Sobrarbe, and the direct successor to the kingdom of Pamplona, the kingdom of Navarre, despite also limiting royal prerogatives, did not have an institution with as many powers as that of the Justicia of Aragon, which appears to have been an Aragonese innovation.

=== Development of the office: 1265-1442 ===
As a matter of fact, the first historical mention of the Justicia appears independently from both the navarrese monarchy and the fabled Fueros of Sobrarbe, in a privilege granted by king Alfonso the Battler to the inhabitants of Zaragoza in 1115. Said document mentions a certain Pedro Giménez acting as Justice of the King' charged with overseeing that the legal rights granted by the monarch were enforced. It is therefore believed that the office of the Justicia likely started as that of a legal advisor in the curia regis of the nascent crown of Aragon, one that quickly evolved into an independent office charged with overseeing the fueros (charters) and customary law of the land.

Whatever its precise origins, by 1265 the office of the Justicia was firmly established in a way that would have been recognised by Vagad and Blancas centuries later. That year, the Aragonese Corts held in Ejea confirmed the Justicia as a mediator and adjudicator in any legal disputes concerning the crown and those groups protected by the Fueros (charters) of Aragon. Said groups included nobility, clergy, burgers and villains, but neither serfs, women, nor minorities (chiefly, jews and muslims). In 1283, the Privilegio General de Aragón issued by Peter III of Aragon further extended the remit of the office of the Justicia, extending its jurisdiction to any disputes and legal suits amongst the nobility and cities. Thus, the Justicia came to become a guarantor of legal propriety in the crown of Aragon.

=== The Right of Manifestación ===
The prestige and power of the office was further enhanced in 1325, when the nobility and cities of Aragon forced James II of Aragon to issue the Declaratio Privilegii generalis, a charter often regarded as the aragonese Magna Carta. This new charter banned torture in the kingdom of Aragon, and established a set of legal remedies to prevent illegal detention and imprisonment in the kingdom. These remedies acted as a form of habeas corpus, which they predate by several decades. The procedure associated with these remedies against illegal imprisonment and torture was known as the "Manifestación de personas" (lit.Demonstration of Persons). As the 18th century jurist Juan Francisco La Ripa put it, the right of Manifestación "freed the person who had been detained or arrested from the duress of torture or of immoderate imprisonment".

The legal remedy of Manifestación operated in a similar way to a writ of habeas corpus. Anyone being arrested had the right of requesting the Justicia to exert the right of Manifestación. Almost by default, the Justicia would order the judge or authorities arresting the person that they hand him over to the Justicia —in aragonese legal parlance, to "manifest" or "demonstrate" meant to "hand over" the person –so as to ensure that no violence fell upon the accused before he had been tried and convicted. Further, the Justicia made sure that the trial, sentencing and conviction were done with all legal propriety and according to the law. Only then would the Justicia hand back the accused for his punishment. If the judge or officer refused to hand over the prisoner to the Justicia, they were deemed to have incurred in "contrafuero" (an illegal action against the charter itself), and could themselves be charged and arrested. The Manifestación thereby prevented the prisoner from being tortured or subjected to illegal imprisonment.

While awaiting and standing trial, the Justicia placed the accused under his protection, which typically entailed the accused (known as the "manifestado", lit."demonstrated") was freed awaiting trial. Sometimes the Justicia would place the accused under house arrest or, in some cases, put him in the so-called "prison of manifestados", famous for their mild conditions. All "manifestados" had to be given access to legal counsel, as well as to all legal papers and evidence held against them so as to ensure they could prepare their own defense. The right of Manifestación only existed for chartered citizens of Aragon, namely nobility, clergy, burgers and villains, but neither women, minorities, nor serfs. Lords retained absolute jurisdiction over their serfs.

=== Officeholders ===
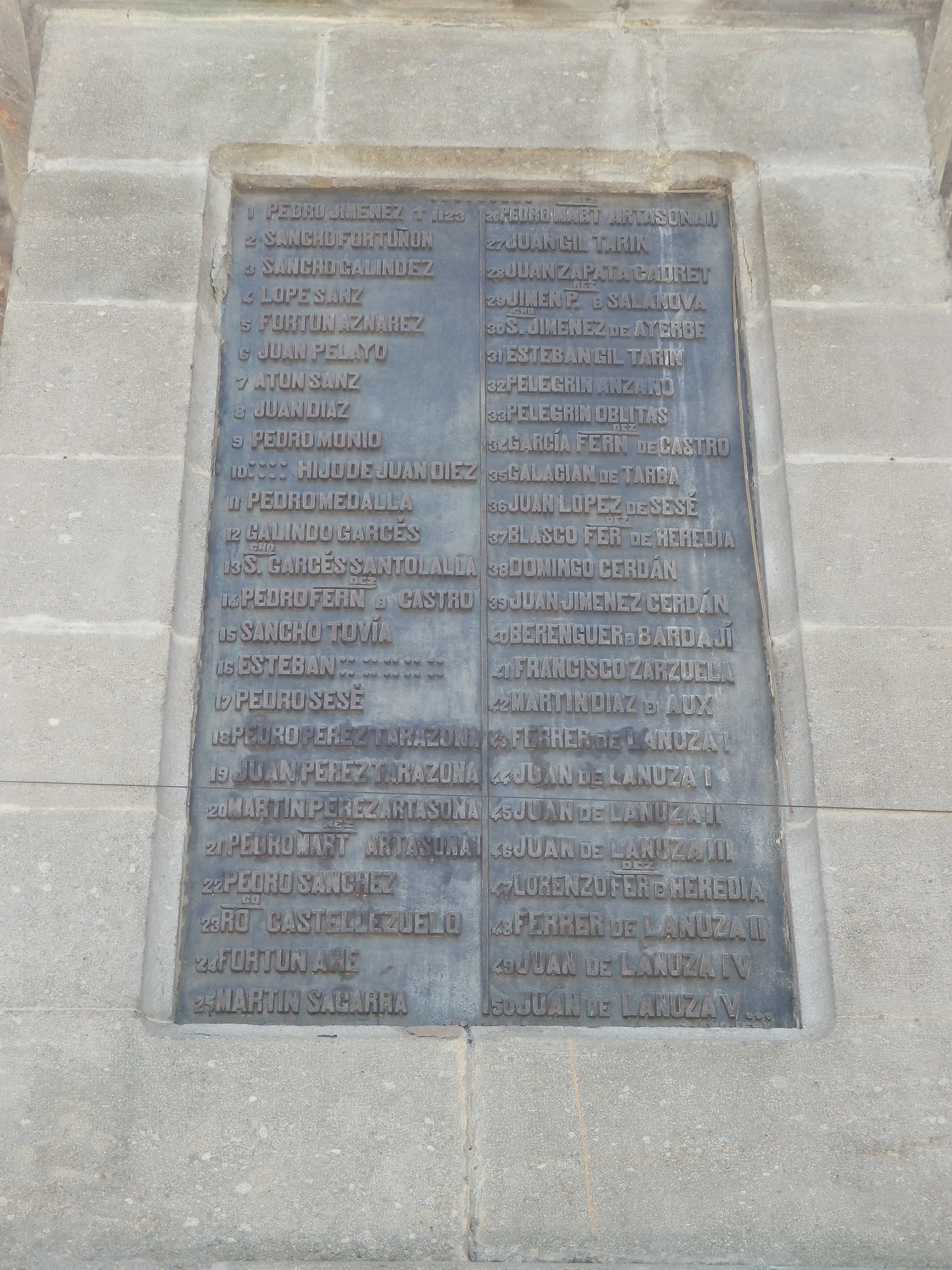
List of the first 50 Justicias.

The Justicia was an inherently aristocratic office. Initially, the office was temporary, but by the late 15th century it had become a life office, often held by fathers and sons in succession. Excluding Pedro Giménez in 1115, the identities officeholders before the mid-13th century are uncertain and marred by semi-legendary accounts. According to the list of Justicias given by Jerónimo Blancas in his Aragonensium rerum commentarii, a certain Fortún Ahe held the office either in 1275 or 1276, and was allegedly followed by Martin Sagarra and, subsequently, Pedro Martínez de Artasona. Martínez de Artasona is one of the earliest Justicias whose office dates are known, as he is mentioned as Justicia in the Cortes held in 1281. Once the union with Catalonia was complete and the Cortes of Aragon had to be called yearly, the names of most officeholders begin to be known, as the Justicia would act ex officio as speaker for the Cortes. Until the 15th century the office was temporary, and its holders would typically held it for a few years at a time.

During the reign of Alfonso V of Aragon, the Aragonese Corts of 1442 (convened in Zaragoza) took advantage of the king's money needs to fund his Italian wars against René of Anjou, and obtained the concession that the Justicia could not be dismissed by any royal power. Thereafter, the office became a life one. The first life-appointed Justicia was Ferrer de Lanuza I, traditionally regarded as the 44th holder of the office and who served as Justicia from 1439 to his death in 1479. The appointment of Justicias remained a prerogative of the Aragonese Corts, and Ferrer I was succeeded by his own son, Juan de Lanuza I, who held the office from 1479 to his death in 1498, and was in turn succeeded in the office by his own son, Juan de Lanuza II (d.1507). Thereafter, all Justicias until 1592 came from the powerful House of Lanuza; the only non-dynastic Lanuza, Lorenzo Fernández de Heredia, was in fact a grandson of Ferrer I and nephew of Juan I, and held the office from 1533 - 1547 in stewardship for his own predecessor's son, Ferrer de Lanuza II, who succeeded de Heredia in 1547. During the Lanuza period, the office saw some important changes. Chief amongst these became the increasing power held by the Lieutenants of the Justicia ("Lugartenientes del Justicia"). This is because the Lanuza Justicias often combined the office with other royal appointments such as the viceroyalty of Sicily or Naples, and started to deputise their duties to their lieutenants, who held most of the technical and legal expertise necessary to carry out the judicial duties of the office. Thus, the Justicia became less of a personal office and more of an institution headed by a dynastic holder, but managed by expert jurists and officers. The Lanuza period of Justicia officeholders came to a dramatic end in 1591, when the then Justicia Juan de Lanuza y Urrea was beheaded for his involvement in the Antonio Pérez affair that pitted the Justicia against king Philip II of Spain.

=== The Antonio Pérez affair and the Alteraciones de Aragón ===
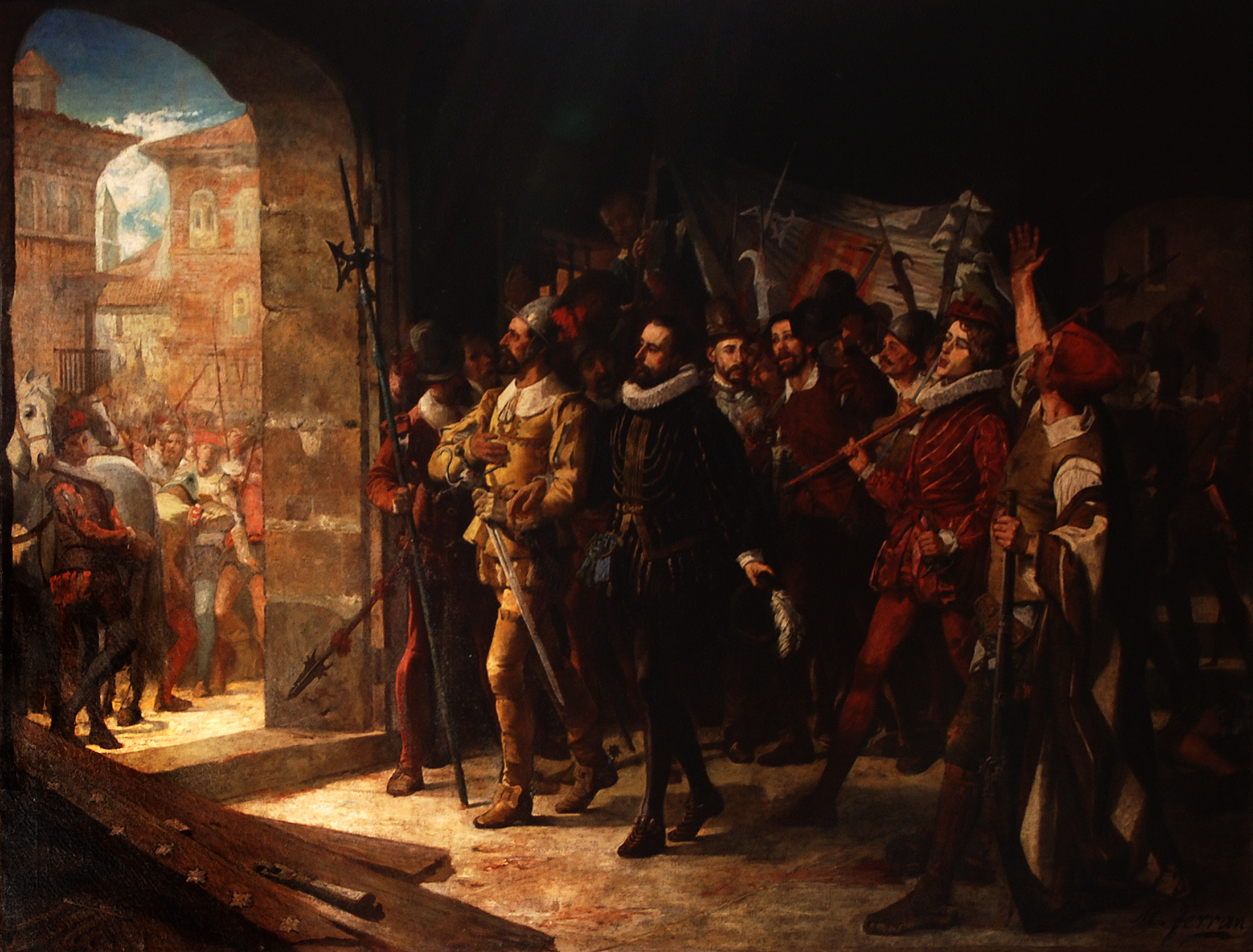
Antonio Pérez being freed by the Justicia and people of Aragon.

In its role as guardian of the rights and freedoms of Aragon, the Justicia would often oppose royal authority. Its most famous confrontation with the crown took place in 1591, the culmination of the Antonio Pérez affair. Pérez, sometime secretary of State and a close collaborator to king Philip II. Pérez had been born in Castile the illegitimate son of Gonzalo Pérez, a cleric and influential secretary of Charles V and Philip II; crucially, Gonzalo had Antonio registered as being Aragonese born. Antonio Pérez entered the service of Philip II, and raised to become one of his secretaries of state; he was one of the most powerful figures at the Spanish court until he was summarily dismissed and arrested in 1579 accused of criminal conspiracy and of instigating the murder of Juan de Escobedo, the royal secretary. Escobedo was a former ally of Pérez himself, and belonged to the faction headed by Don Juan de Austria; he was in fact assassinated at the behest of Philip II himself once Escobedo's involvement in Don Juan's failed attempt at invading England, freeing and marrying Mary, Queen of Scots, and having himself crowned king of England became known to the king; although the reasons for this decision are unclear, it seems that the potential scandal of a public arrest could have rocked Philip's own reign, and the monarch arranged with Pérez for the assassination of Escobedo instead. Initially, Philip II was reluctant to find a guilty party, but because the scandal following the assassination threatened with paralysing his own government, he eventually dismissed and had Pérez arrested. After almost a decade of inquiries, legal disputes and court delays, in 1587 Pérez was formally charged with murder under the laws of Castile. In April 1590, before being formally sentenced, Pérez escaped the castle of Turégano where he was being imprisoned, and fled to Aragon, where he used his Aragonese ascendency to invoke the right of Manifestación. The Justicia de Aragon at the time, Juan V de Lanuza, granted the request as a matter of course.

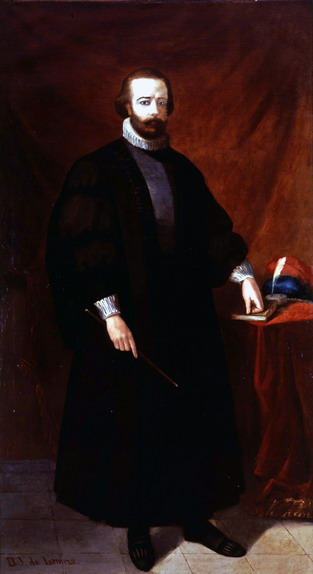
Portrait of Juan V de Lanuza y Urrea, last Lanuza Justicia, executed in 1591 in the exercise of his duties.

With this, Pérez could not be extradited to Castile without a formal judicial process. He then moved slowly towards Zaragoza while he raised his supporters. On 1 May 1590 he entered triumphantly in Zaragoza surrounded by his followers and escorts. There he was put in the prison of manifestados subject to the Justicia of Aragon, which for him meant protection from the king and the judicial process in Castile. In the prison of manifestados Antonio Pérez enjoyed great liberty. He received his friends and prepared his defence. He had access to all his legal papers, which had to be sent to Aragón whilst the Justicia reviewed his case.

Pérez and his associates depicted the attempts by Philip II to capture him as an attack on Aragon's charters and privileges. The Justicia and legal officers of Aragon sided with Pérez, and obstructed Philip II's attempts to have Pérez extradited back to Castile. Thus, the king was forced to start new legal proceedings in Aragon against his former secretary under various accusations, all of which were unsuccessful. Eventually, Philip II had Pérez charged with heresy through the Inquisition, which as an ecclesiastical organisation had jurisdiction in both Castile and Aragon. When Pérez was moved from the prison of "manifestados" to the Aljafería to stand trial in front of the Inquisition, the people of Zaragoza rioted and Pérez had to be returned to the prison of manifestados.

The attempt at prosecuting Pérez through the Inquisition caused great discontent in Aragon, as it was perceived to be a frontal attempt by the royal court of Castile and the King himself at flouting Aragonese laws. As a result, riots broke out in Zaragoza that quickly spread throughout the whole of Aragon, until a more or less open climate of revolt arose in Aragon. The revolt is known as the Alteraciones de Aragón ("Disorders" of Aragon), and it became so unmanageable that the viceroy of Aragon, Alonso de Vargas, asked Philip II to deploy troops in Aragon.

Spearheaded by the Justicia Juan de Lanuza, the Diputación of Aragon (the executive branch of the Aragonese corts) declared the entry of troops illegal, and invoked the ancient right to rebel, inviting the Aragonese to take arms against the king if he were to attempt a military invasion of Aragon. The Justicia and his followers attempted to resist the royal army by raising some levies, but in early November 1591, conscious of the inferiority of their numbers and upon receiving the news that a 12,000 strong army headed by the viceroy of Aragon had entered Aragon, he abandoned the few troops he had gathered in Utebo and fled to Épila alongside other leaders of the rebellion. Unopposed, the royal troops marched towards Zaragoza, which they entered in late November 1591. At that point Antonio Pérez and some of his followers escaped to France, but the Justicia de Aragon Juan V was captured alongside a few other officials, and Philip II had him beheaded in early 1592 accused of abetting the riots and organising an open rebellion.

In order to prevent further uprisings and pacify Aragon, Philip II convened the Cortes of Aragon in Tarazona in 1592, which agreed to pass several reforms to the Fueros of Aragon. Albeit no institution was suppressed, the functioning of several of them was changed. Crucially, the office of the Justicia was placed under firm royal control. The office remained a life-appointment, but all subsequent Justicias were to be named by the king himself, more control was placed on the appointment of their lieutenants, and subsequent Spanish monarchs avoided handing over the office to a single family. The sole Lanuza Justicia of the 17th century was Martín Bautista de Lanuza, a cousin of Juan V, was allowed to hold the office from 1601 to his death 1622 thanks to the loyalty he had shown to both Philip II and Philip III.

=== War of the Spanish Succession and abolition of the office ===
The last regularly appointed Justicia, Miguel de Jaca y Niño (appointed in 1700, d.1707) was dismissed from his office in 1706 by the Austrian claimant archduke Charles, when his troops occupied Aragon during the War of the Spanish Succession (1702–1714). The territories of the Crown of Aragon had sided with the Austrian claimant to the throne. As part of his attempt at establishing a loyal administration and rewarding his supporters, Charles appointed a new Justicia, Domingo Antonio Gabín, who would become the last Justicia of the historical line.

Indeed, when the troops of the rival French claimant, the Duke of Anjou, invaded Aragon in 1707, the Justicia Gabín was imprisoned and dismissed from his office. No new Justicia was appointed until archduke Charles attempted to restore the office by naming Agustín de Estanga as new Justicia in 1709. De Estanga died shortly after in 1710, and neither he nor his nominal successor, José Ozqáriz ever formally took over the office. Regardless, when the French troops captured Aragon in 1710, the office was deemed vacant. The following year, Philip V of Spain passed a Nueva Planta Decree that abolished both the office of the Justicia and the Fueros of Aragon. With that, the Aragonese institutions were absorbed by the Spanish monarchy, and the kingdom lost its former juridical independence.

=== Modern Justicia ===
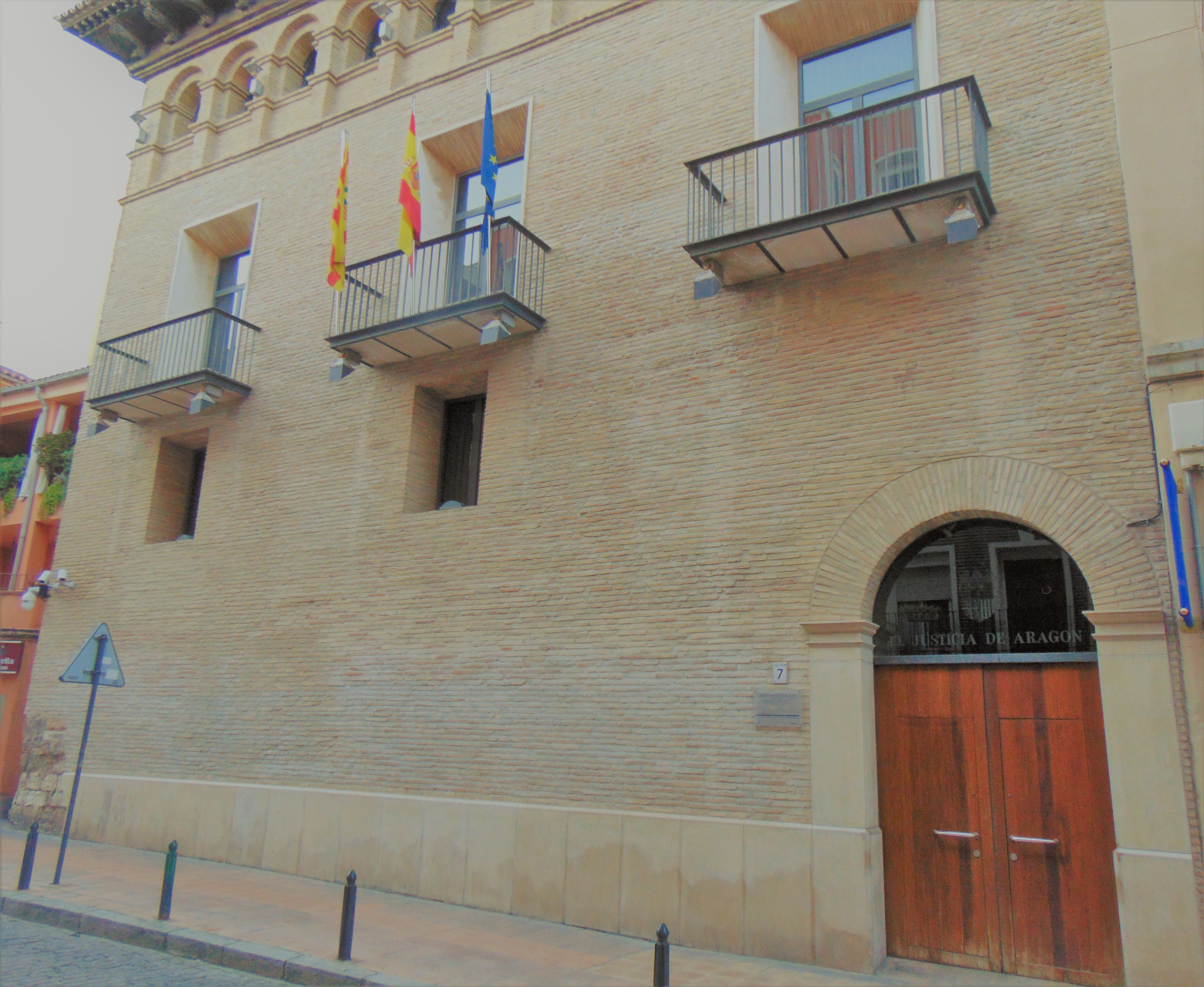
Palace of Armijo, modern seat of the Justicia de Aragon.

During the 19th century, the ancient office of the Justicia became a focal point of Aragonese regionalism, deep in symbolism for its historical independence and opposition to what were perceived as royal abuses of power. In 1982, after 395 years, the office of the Justicia de Aragon was restored with the passing of the 1982 Statute of Autonomy of Aragon. The powers of the modern office, albeit heavy in symbolism, are largely those of an ombudsman. Still, reminiscing its old powers, and unlike most ombudsman offices, the modern Justicia is charged with defending the Statute of Autonomy of Aragon, and with overseeing the juridical order of Aragon (particularly, private law).

== Bibliography ==
- Blancas, Jerónimo (1588). Aragonensium rerum Commentarii (in Latin). apud Laurentium Robles & Didacum fratres ...
- Danvila y Collado, Manuel (1881). Las libertades de Aragón: ensayo histórico, jurídico y político. Imprenta de Fortanet.
- Giesey, Ralph E. (1968). If not, not. The oath of the aragonese and the legendary laws of Sobrarbe. Princeton University Press.
- Pérez, Antonio (1598). Relaciones de Antonio Perez secretario de Estado, que fue del Rey de España.
- Sarasa Sánchez, Esteban (1988). "La sociedad aragonesa en la baja Edad Media" (PDF). Destierros Aragoneses: Ponencias y Comunicaciones. Institución Fernando el Católico: 329–343. ISBN 84-00-06779-7.
- Savall y Dronda, Pascual; Penén y Debesa, Santiago (1866). Fueros, Observancias y Actos de Corte del Reyno de Aragón. Tomo I: Fueros. El Justicia de Aragón y IberCaja.
- Tomás y Valiente, Francisco (2000). La tortura judicial en España. Barcelona: Crítica. ISBN 84-8432-029-4.
