= Jerónimo Zurita y Castro =

Spanish historian

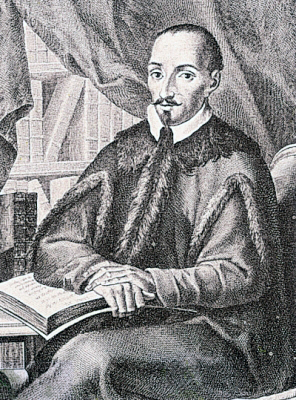
Jerónimo Zurita

Jerónimo (or Gerónimo) de Zurita y Castro or simply Jerónimo (or Gerónimo) de Zurita (1512 – 3 November 1580) was a Spanish historian of the sixteenth century who founded the modern tradition of historical scholarship in Spain.

Born at Zaragoza, Kingdom of Aragon, he studied at Alcalá de Henares under the Hellenist Hernán Nuñez. Through the influence of his father, Miguel de Zurita, physician to Charles V, Holy Roman Emperor, he entered the public service as magistrate at Barbastro, and in 1537 was appointed assistant-secretary of the Inquisition. In 1548 Zurita was nominated official chronicler of the Kingdom of Aragon, and in 1566 Philip II of Spain attached him as secretary to the council of the Inquisition, delegating to him the conduct of all matters sufficiently important to require the king's signature. Zurita resigned these posts on the January 21, 1571, obtained a sinecure at Zaragoza, and dedicated himself wholly to the composition of his Anales de la Corona de Aragón, the first part of which had appeared in 1562; he lived to see the last volume printed at Zaragoza on the April 22, 1580, and died on the November 3 following.

Zurita's style is somewhat crabbed and dry, but his authority is unquestionable; he displayed a new conception of an historian's duties, and, not content with the ample materials stored in the Archives of Aragon, continued his researches in the libraries of Rome, Naples and Sicily.

== Quotes ==
"Historians use legends as geographers do fabulous animals-to symbolize unknown countries in their maps" - quoted from Spanish Historiography and Iberian Reality by J. N. Hillgarth, History and Theory, Vol. 24, No. 1 (Feb., 1985), pp. 23–43.
