= Juan Enguera =

Spanish bishop and inquisitor

Juan Enguera (died 1513) was the Grand Inquisitor of the Crown of Aragon from 1507 to 1513.

== Biography ==
Juan Enguera was born in Valencia in the fifteenth century. A member of the Dominican Order, Enguera rose to become a confessor of Ferdinand II of Aragon.

Enguera was appointed Bishop of Vic on 19 December 1505. He was later appointed Bishop of Lleida on 9 December 1510, and then Bishop of Tortosa on 1 October 1512. In addition to his duties as a bishop, he was the Grand Inquisitor of the Crown of Aragon from 1507 to 1513.

Enguera died in Valladolid on 14 February 1513.

== External links and additional sources ==
- Cheney, David M. "Diocese of Lleida". Catholic-Hierarchy.org. (for Chronology of Bishops) ^{[self-published]}
- Chow, Gabriel. "Diocese of Lleida (Spain)". GCatholic.org. (for Chronology of Bishops) ^{[self-published]}

Catholic Church titles
Preceded by	Bishop of Vic; 1505–1510	Succeeded by Joan de Tormo
Preceded by Diego Ramírez de Guzmán	Grand Inquisitor of Aragon; 1507–1513	Succeeded by Luis Mercader Escolano
Preceded by Lluís Joan de Milá	Bishop of Lleida; 1510–1512	Succeeded by Jaume Conchillos
Preceded by Alfons d'Aragó	Bishop of Tortosa; 1512–1513	Succeeded by Lluís Mercader
