= Luis Mercader Escolano =

Spanish bishop and inquisitor

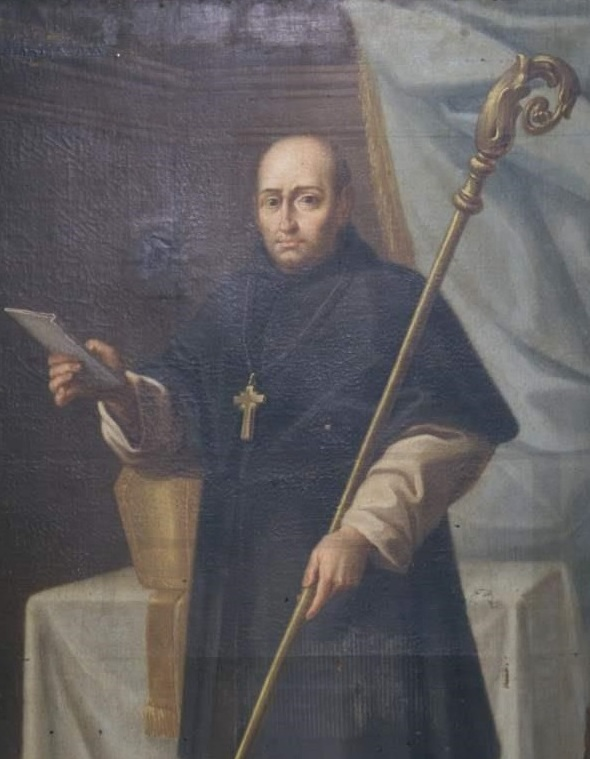
Luis Mercader Escolano

Luis Mercader Escolano (1444–1516) was the Grand Inquisitor of the Kingdom of Aragon from 1513 to 1516.

== Biography ==
Luis Mercader Escolano was born in Murviedro in 1444. He was a Carthusian. He was appointed Bishop of Tortosa on 20 May 1513. Pope Leo X appointed him Grand Inquisitor of the Kingdom of Aragon at the same time. He died on 9 June 1516.

Catholic Church titles
Preceded by Juan Enguera	Bishop of Tortosa; 1513–1516	Succeeded by Adrian of Utrecht
Preceded by Juan Enguera	Grand Inquisitor of Aragon; 1513–1516	Succeeded by Adrian of Utrecht
