= Juan Pablo de Aragón-Azlor, 11th Duke of Villahermosa =

Spanish peer

The Most Excellent Juan Pablo de Aragón-Azlor 11th Duke of Villahermosa GE
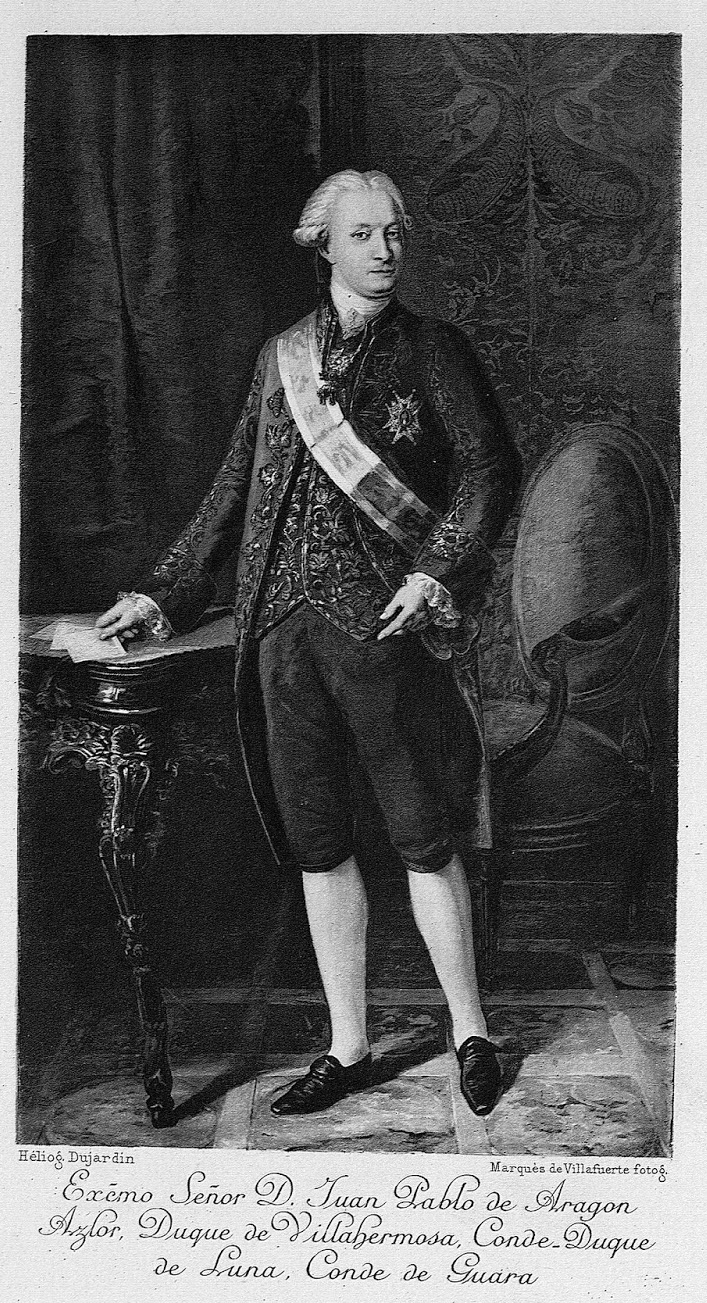
- Portrayed in a lithography, c. 1895
- Born: Juan Pablo de Aragón-Azlor y Zapata de Calatayud; 24 January 1730; Pedrola, Spain
- Died: 17 September 1790 (aged 60); Madrid, Spain
- Spouse: María Manuela Pignatelli y Gonzaga
- Children: Víctor Amadeo de Aragón-Azlor y Pignatelli, 12th Duke of Villahermosa; José Antonio de Aragón-Azlor y Pignatelli, 13th Duke of Villahermosa; Juan Pablo de Aragón-Azlor y Pignatelli
- Parents: Juan José de Aragón-Azlor, 3rd Count of Guara (father); Inés Zapata de Calatayud (mother)

Seat K of the Real Academia Española
- In office 29 February 1780 – 17 September 1790
- Preceded by: Francisco Manuel de la Mata
- Succeeded by: Antonio de Porlier

Juan Pablo de Aragón-Azlor y Zapata de Calatayud, 11th Duke of Villahermosa, 6th Duke of Palata, GE (24 January 1730 – 17 September 1790), was a Spanish peer and diplomat. He was a knight of the Order of the Golden Fleece and of the Order of Charles III.

== Biography ==
=== Family origins ===
Juan Pablo was born the 24 January 1730, son of Juan José de Aragón-Azlor, who was the 3rd Count of Guara, brother of José Claudio de Aragón-Gurrea, 10th Duke of Villahermosa. His mother was Inés Zapata de Calatayud, daughter of the Counts of Real. Through the death with no descendants of his uncle in 1760, he inherited all of his titles. Before inheriting the dukedom, he was already the 4th Count of Guara, 8th Count of Luna, 11th Count of Cortes, Baron of Panzano, 14th Lord of La Zaida in Zaragoza, etc.

=== Early years ===
During his time as attaché to the Embassy of Spain in France and in his forties, he married the ambassador's daughter, María Manuela Pignatelli y Gonzaga (her father was Joaquín Atanasio Pignatelli de Aragón y Moncayo, 16th Count of Fuentes and her mother María Luisa Gonzaga, close relatives of Saint Joseph Pignatelli).

In 1772, Juan Pablo left the embassy in Paris, where his father-in-law was ambassador, and went first to London and then to Madrid, from where he was sent abroad for fear of his possible influence in the royal family. He was ambassador of Spain to the Kingdom of Sardinia from 1779 to 1783.

=== Later years ===
Juan Pablo was a prominent member of the "Aragonese party" around Charles III, a Francophile and Voltairean party, intellectually led by Pedro Pablo Abarca de Bolea, 10th Count of Aranda, the notable military officer and politician who was successor to Pignatelli at the Embassy in Paris, and who was ambassador to France for fourteen years, from 1773 to 1787. He financially and politically supported, through Benjamin Franklin, the United States Inderpendance, and prior to that was ambassador in Poland and England.

In 1777 there was a real estate sale in Madrid, which opened the doors to real estate reforms and changes by the Dukes of Villahermosa, the Azlor de Aragón-Pignatelli couple towards a conversion to a neoclassical palace which was called Palacio de Villahermosa after 1805, and which today is the current Thyssen-Bornemisza Museum, located at Paseo del Prado 8, opposite the Prado museum and the Botanical Garden.

== Titles held ==
=== Dukedoms ===
- 11th Duke of Villahermosa (GE)
- 6th Duke of Palata (GE)

=== Marquessates ===
- 4th Marquess of Cábrega

=== Countships ===
- 8th Count of Luna
- 8th Count of Real
- 9th Count of Sinarcas
- 7th Count of Villamonte

== See also ==
- List of dukes in the peerage of Spain
- List of current grandees of Spain
