= Castle of Burgos =

Castle in Burgos, Spain

Coordinates: 42.3428°N 3.7072°W

Castillo de Burgos
- Burgos in Spain
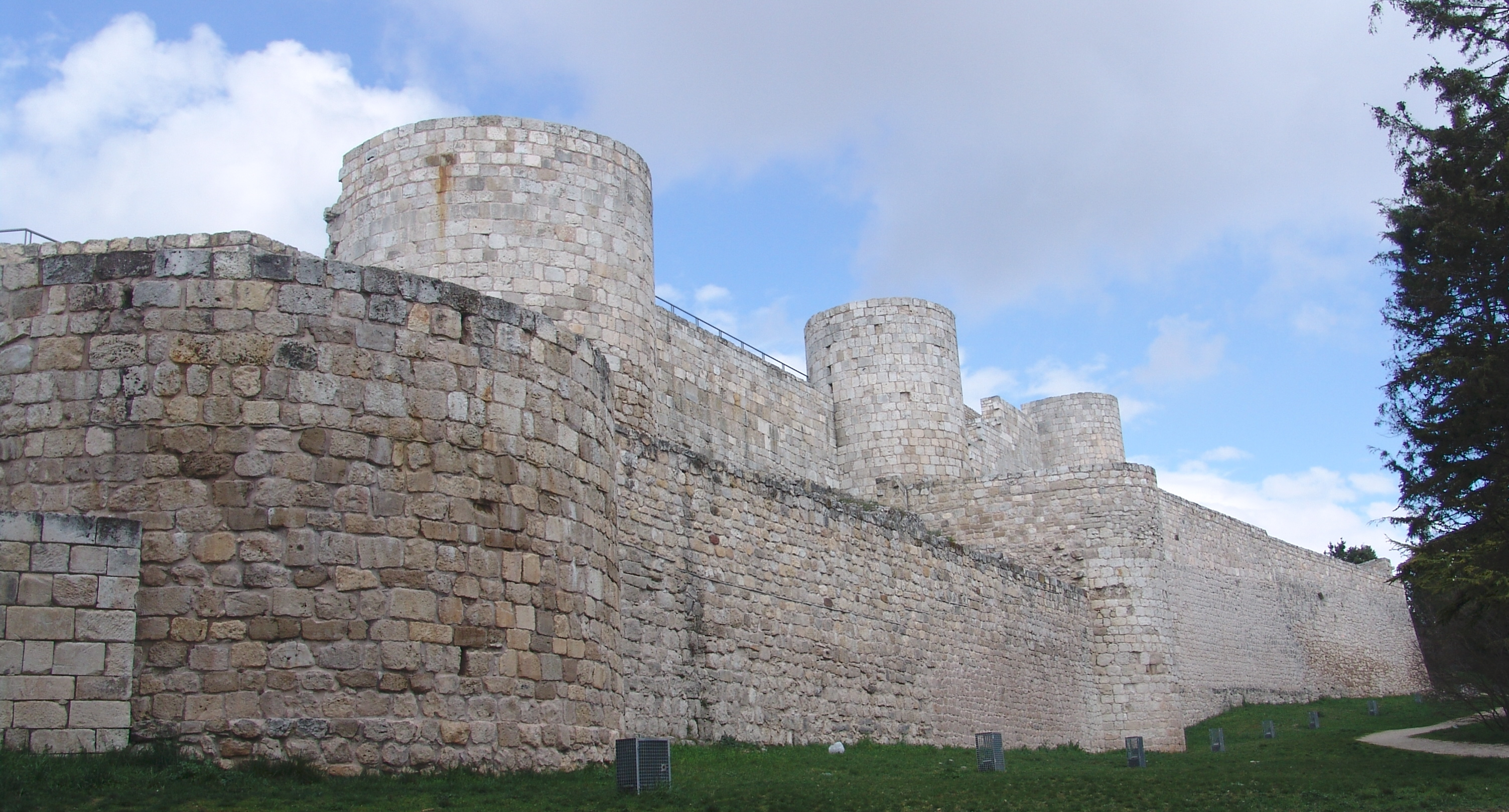
- Ruins of the Castle of Burgos in 2008

Site information
- Type: Castle

The Castle of Burgos was a castle and alcázar, located in the city of Burgos, in the hill of San Miguel to 75 metres (246 ft) above the city and to 981 metres (3,219 ft) above the sea. This hill was the subject of archaeological surveys by General Centeno in the years 1925 and 1926 trying to find Napoleonic military files from when the French in their retreat blew up the fortress. According to the results obtained in this excavation the origin of the castle dates to the Visigoths, and its oldest parts, to the Romans.

The castle grew over the centuries, becoming a major fortification and residence of the kings of Castile. Following the accession of the Habsburg family the castle lost its importance as a royal residence, and during the French occupation, on 15 June 1813, the French army decided to leave the Castle of Burgos, and they destroyed it with explosives. The explosion resulted in the almost total destruction of all the castle grounds. The castle remains in ruins.

== History ==
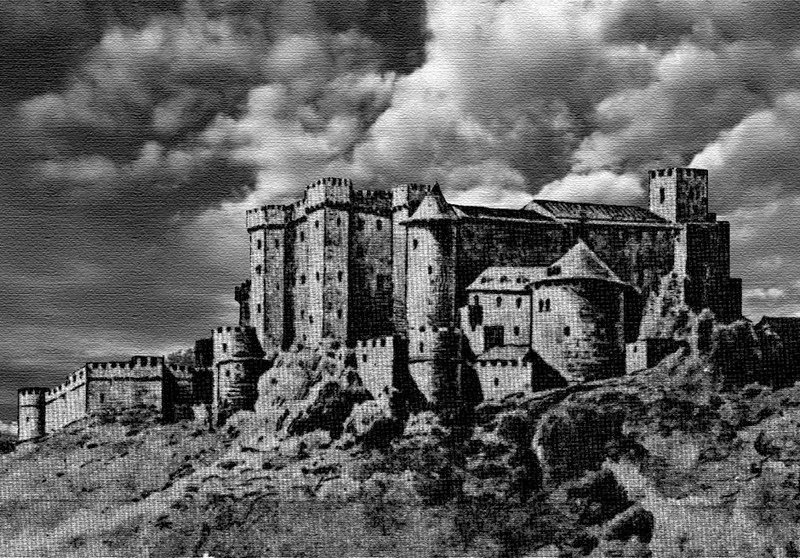
Engraving of the Castle of Burgos from the work "Civitates Orbis Terrarum" (by Braun & Hogenberg) of 1576, and also added this source for the book "El Castillo y Fortificaciones de Burgos" (by Fernando Sánchez and Moreno del Moral).

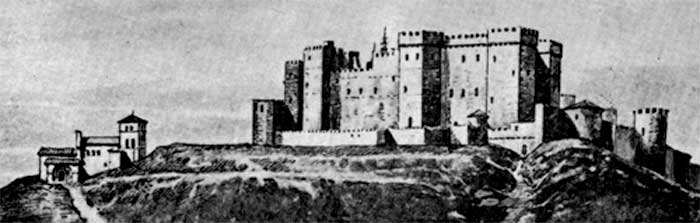
Back facade of the Castle of Burgos and the church of Santa María La Blanca before the French Napoleonic invasion

=== Prehistoric archaeological site ===
In the mid-1980s a complex archaeological study was conducted in which it was established that the signs of oldest human populations both in the hills del Depósito, de San Miguel and del Castillo, form an ensembles of the first order. Traces of prehistoric human groups both of the Beaker culture, and the first Iron Age with similarities to Soto de Medinilla. Within the hill of the castle was located the oldest town on record in the city of Burgos dated around 2000 B.C.

=== Foundation and Medieval ages ===
In the early 860 AD the Muslim historian Ibn 'Idhari mentions that an expedition defeated "Gundisalvo" Lord of Burdgia.

Oliver Copons believes that the great fortress was already built back in 865 when Muslims invaded the Castilian plateau led by Al-Mundhir of Córdoba. Twenty years later the Asturian monarch Alfonso III ordered Count Diego Rodríguez Porcelos to repopulate and re-fortify Burgos, having triumphed in the Battle of Briviesca and in defending Pancorbo.

The growing importance of the city required a great fortress, whose perimeter is well documented. Medieval travelers unanimously tell of the feeling of strength and security it offered. Probably during the reign of Alfonso VIII of Castile the first great transformation occurred, as experts builders altered the castle to fit the Mudéjar taste of the time. Castilian king Henry IV made the second change, mainly for beautification, turning the castle into a palace with halls, chambers and chapel.

"The kings of Castile, having that fortress, has title to the kingdom, and can be with good confidence called kings of it, because it is head of Castile and chamber of the kings."

=== Sieges ===
Ferdinand the Catholic besieged it in the war against Joanna la Beltraneja. The siege started in August 1474 and lasted until January 1476. This period saw some of the hardest fighting in the castle's history, as the besiegers attempted to cut off the castle's water supply, miners working with the dual purpose of intercepting the well and collapsing the walls, as noted by Luciano Serrano.

The castle was not attacked again until 1812, when following the Battle of Salamanca the Allied army of the Duke of Wellington besieged the city in the Siege of Burgos. Due to difficulties with supply and French reinforcements moving up from Andalusia he was forced to raise the siege after a number of failed attacks, retreating to the Portuguese frontier.

=== Famous prisoners ===
The Castle of Burgos was used as prison of state, being occupied by the kings García II of Galicia and Alfonso VI of León and Castile and by Tomás de Gournay, murderer of King Edward II of England.

In 1277, as referred to in the Annals of the reign of Alfonso X, the Infante Frederick of Castile, son of Ferdinand III of Castile, was executed in the castle by order of his brother Alfonso X of Castile, who also executed at the same time Simón Ruiz of Cameros, lord of Cameros the son in law of Infante Frederick of Castile. The version provided by the Annals of the reign of Alfonso X, after of the Chronicle of Alfonso X of the execution of Infante Frederick, is as follows:

"It was a thousand and three hundred and sixteen years, the Infante Don Sancho, son of King Alfonso and heir, prisonered to Don Ximón Ruiz of Cameros in Logroño by order of the king his father. Is in this year king Alfonso prisonered to Don Frederick, his brother, in Burgos, and sending him get into the castle and put in a chest that was filled with sharp irons and died there." (written in Medieval Spanish).

Later, after spending several years in an unworthy place, the remains of the infante Frederick of Castile were transferred in 1282, by order of his nephew Sancho IV of Castile to the missing Convento de la Santísima Trinidad in Burgos, which was demolished in the 19th century.

=== Gunpowder factory ===
During the Early Modern Age and because of the evolution of military techniques, and the fact that Spain's wars were fought overseas, the castle gradually lost its defensive function. Within its walls was settled the first training school for gunners in Spain, producing twenty quintals of gunpowder daily in 1542.

=== Royal Alcázar ===
The palace of Alfonso X was inhabited by John II of Castile and also by his father Henry III of Castile.

=== Destruction ===
A fire in 1739 resulted in the destruction of the interior, including some coffered ceilings. During the War of Independence the city regained its strategic position and the French proceeded to strengthen the castle's defences as a strong point which could dominate the Castilian plain.

In 1813 Wellington's rapid advance caught the French off-balance and the decision was taken to evacuate the castle rather than risk being cut off. Demolition parties were assigned to destroy the castle with explosives eliminating any military value or documentary material that could be useful to the enemy. Such was their haste that the castle was blown up without allowing time for the evacuation of the last soldiers. More than two hundred French soldiers died in the blast, which shook the entire city.

With the explosion, the Church of Santa María La Blanca was destroyed, the cathedral lost most of its windows and the church of San Esteban was damaged. The bodies of the French soldiers killed in the blast are buried in the chopera del Carmen.

=== Semaphore line ===
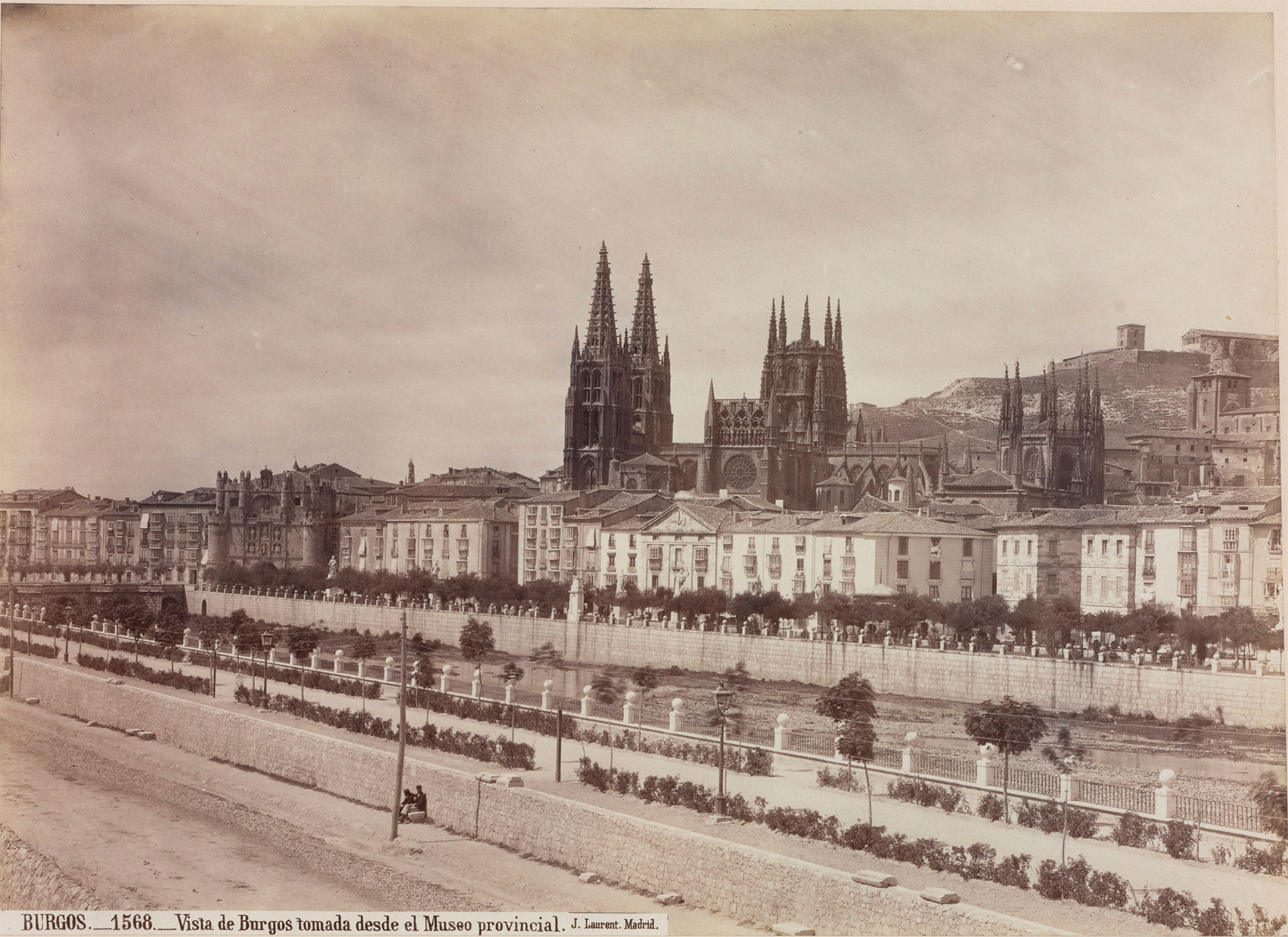
Semaphore tower on the ruins of the Castle of Burgos in 1870 – photography of J. Laurent

The Castle of Burgos played a key role in the communication system with the semaphore line devised in Spain in the 19th century. In the province of Burgos there are still remains, in various states of preservation, of the many towers that were built to communicate between the center of the peninsula and the north. The Castle of Burgos was position 27 of the Line of Castile that connected Madrid with Irun.

=== Recent times ===
The castle was used sporadically during the Carlist Wars and also during the Spanish Civil War, the anti-aircraft defense of the city being based within the walls.

Between the years 1955 and 1958 some attempts at reconstruction were made.

In the last archaeological excavation (1985) the deep well and its spiral stairs were discovered. A team of speleologists mapped the interior of the well (also known as Cueva del Moro). They descended to 61 metres noting the great constructive ashlar and its various ramifications. A great piece of Medieval engineering. Subsequently, a cistern under the main courtyard was also discovered.

A digital reconstruction has been made on the basis of one of the engravings of the work "Civitatis Orbi Terrarum" of 1576.

== Current status ==
Today the castle is a playground with streets dedicated to poets. The remains of the fortress, in a state of ruins, has allowed its qualification as a museum and interpretation center, opened in 2003 and visitors can also see the well and the tunnels, known as Cueva del Moro.

=== Gates ===
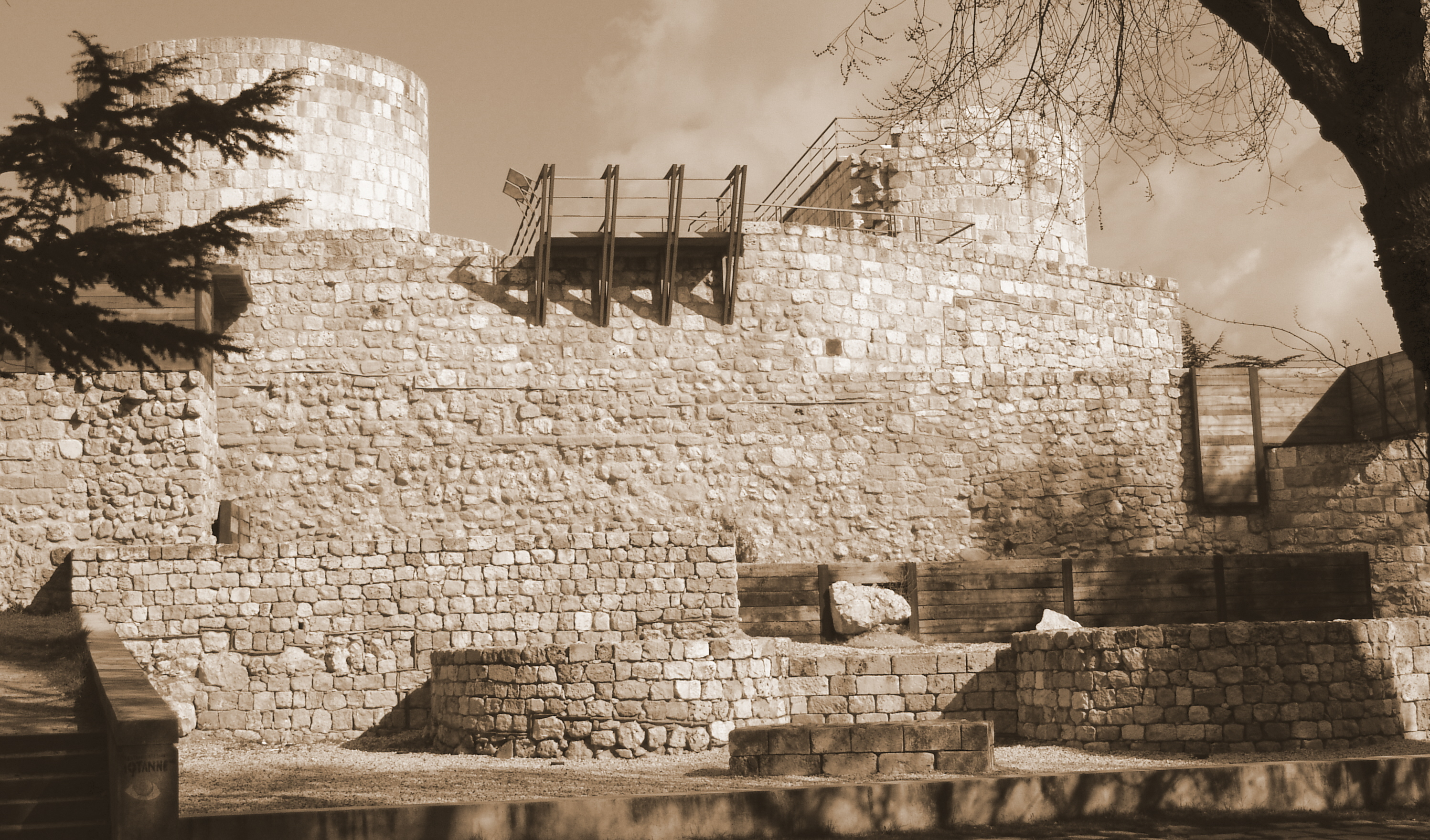
Ruins of the Burgos Castle. South gate.

Recent archaeological excavations have uncovered the remains of the South Gate. This is a broken wall, open to a vain flanked by two towers of semicircular plant. The front gate is open in the northwestern front, it has a vaulted passageway.

=== Well ===
As part of the underground complex, the well has galleries of more than 300 metres (980 ft) in length. Dating from the 12th and 13th centuries, although the first reports date from 1475, during the siege by the army of Isabella I of Castile, during the War of the Castilian Succession, the castle being defended by supporters of Joanna la Beltraneja. Factory work of ashlar in limestone, consisting of a vertical hollow cylinder reaches a depth of 61.50 metres (201.8 ft). Access is provided by 6 spindles or vertical cylinder of 1.4 metres (4.6 ft) internal diameter .

"For that this Castle was safer and it not could take by thirst, made its founder near its entrance, on the inside, a so deep well, which for down to the birth of water has around a snail-shaped stone staircase and three hundred thirty-five steps with its skylights in places that give light, although low, and is so artfully done that looks like work of enchantment.

=== Other elements ===
Bailey, remains of the Tower of Homage, anthropomorphic tombs, several rooms and floors.

== See also ==
- List of missing landmarks in Spain

== Bibliography ==
- José Luis Urribarri, Primeros asentamientos humanos en la ciudad de Burgos: I El Yacimiento arqueológico del castillo y Cerro de San Miguel. Burgos: Aldecoa 1987.
- José Sagredo García, El castillo de Burgos: Una recuperación en marcha. City Hall of Burgos, 1999 ISBN 84-87876-15-3.
- Eduardo Carmona Ballestero, Antiguas noticias, nuevas interpretaciones: la ocupación campaniforme del Cerro del Castillo de Burgos. SAGVNTVM (P.L.A.V.) 45, 2013: 49 - 64
