= María López de Gurrea =

Spanish noblewoman

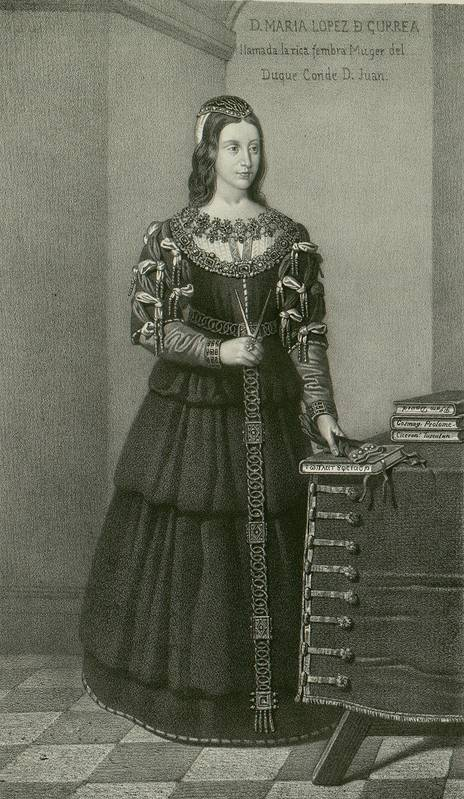

María López de Gurrea (fl. 1492), nicknamed "la Ricahembra", was a Spanish noblewoman.

She was known in Renaissance Spain for her great learning and considered a scholar in Greek and Latin.

She was the daughter of Master Juan López de Gurrea, governor of Aragon, and Aldonza de Gurrea, lady of Pedrola, of whom she was the sole heiress. She married in 1479 Juan II de Ribagorza, illegitimate son of the Duke of Villahermosa. The marriage produced at least three daughters and one son, Alonso Felipe de Aragón, third Count of Ribagorza.
María spent most of her days in her villa in Pedrola. A learned woman, she mastered classical literature, both Greek and Latin authors. She died in Alcalá de Ebro "when she was still young" and was buried in Pedrola.
