= Francesco Chieregati =

Francesco Chiericati, also written Chieregati or Chieregato (1479, Vicenza – 6 December 1539, Bologna), was a papal nuncio and bishop, member of the house of Chiericati from Vicenza.

== Life and career ==
Sent by Pope Leo X as papal nuncio to England (1515–17), he also filled a similar office in Portugal and in Spain (1519), becoming acquainted with Cardinal Adrian Florent, Bishop of Tortosa, the Dutch preceptor of Charles V, and later Pope Adrian VI.

== Diet of Nuremberg, War against Turks, Magellan's expedition ==
The personal instruction, issued probably on the same date, and read to the Diet by Chieregati, is one of the most important documents for the early history of the Protestant Reformation. In it Pope Adrian confesses that the sins of ecclesiastics were the chief cause of the tribulations of the Church, and that in the Roman Curia itself, both head and members, popes and prelates, had been guilty of abuses. The reply of the Diet was discouraging; the princes and representatives avoided an answer to the pope's requests, proposed the celebration of a general council in some German city, and renewed in the earlier antipapal complaints of the Germans, the famous Centum gravamina teutonicae nationis; Pastor adds that the failure of Chieregati was in large measure owing to the great German prelates who were by no means ready to repeat the confession of the pope. The latter has often been blamed for his frankness, but Pastor defends him, saying that his admissions were necessary.

Chieregati was the patron of Antonio Pigafetta, who accompanied the expedition of Ferdinand Magellan. Pigafetta sent his journal of the expedition, and the voyage round the world completed by its only surviving ship, the Victoria, to Chieregati while he was at the Diet. Chieregati made it available to Diet attendees. An account of the expedition, with a globe illustrating the voyage, was also sent by Emperor Charles V to his brother Archduke Ferdinand of Austria, who was presiding at the Diet. The account that was probably taken down by Maximilianus Transylvanus, and the globe a copy of the one made by him. The globe was displayed to the attendees. Chieregati, having examined the globe, described the Victoria’s itinerary to his patron, Isabella d’Este Gonzaga, Marchesa of Mantua. Chieregati also sent Transylvanus' account to Francesco Minizio Calvo in Rome, who had it published in November 1523.
