= Centum gravamina teutonicae nationis =

Religious grievances list

The Centum gravamina teutonicae nationis, or Gravamina for short, was a list of "one hundred grievances [see gravamen] of the German nation" directed at the Catholic Church in Germany, brought forward by the German princes, Fürsten, assembled at the Diet of Nuremberg in 1522–23. They were in fact the second book of grievances (Secundum Gravaminum Libellus), the first being the Gravamina Nationis Germanicae et Sacri Romani Imperii Decem (ten grievances of the German nation and the Holy Roman Empire) that had been circulating in manuscript in the years leading up to the Protestant Reformation since 1455, when first presented by Dietrich von Erbach, the Archbishop of Mainz. Their first English editor and translator writes of them:

It must be borne in mind that this detail of "Grievances" is not an attack made on the Church of Rome and her priesthood by seceders, by "Protestants", anxious to chronicle and exaggerate abuses to strengthen their own position, but they were "grievances" of those who, having no desire to leave the Roman Church, felt how grievously the corruptions complained of pressed upon its members and impaired its efficacy.

== Editions ==
- Collette, Charles Hastings, ed. (1869), One Hundred Grievances: A Chapter from the History of Pre-Reformation Days, London.
