= Alfonso de Aragón y Escobar =

- Duke of Villahermosa; Count of Ribagorza
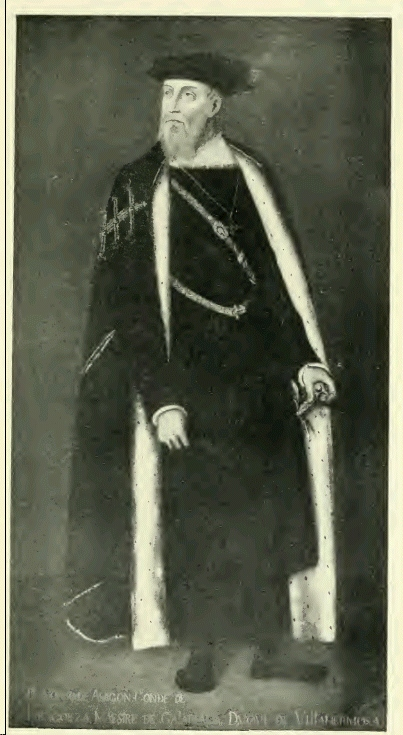
- Born: 1417; Olmedo, Valladolid
- Died: 1485 (aged 67–68); Linares, Jaén
- Issue Detail: Fernando de Aragón y de Sotomayor; Alfonso de Aragón y de Sotomayor; María de Aragón y de Sotomayor
- Father: John II of Aragon
- Mother: Leonor de Escobar

Cross of the Order of Calatrava.

Alfonso (or Alonso) (Note: Don Alonso, bastardo de Juan II, conde de Ribagorza (1469–1477).) de Aragon y Escobar (1417–1485), Duke of Villahermosa, Count of Ribagorza and Cortes and Grand Master of the Order of Calatrava, was an illegitimate son of John II of Aragon and one of his mistresses, Leonor de Escobar, daughter of Alfonso Rodríguez de Escobar.

His brothers and half brothers included Prince Charles of Trastámara and Viana (Charles IV of Navarre) and King Ferdinand II of Aragon, called the Catholic.

On August 18, 1443, he was elected Master of the Order of Calatrava and dismissed on September 19, 1445, replaced by Pedro Girón. Received the title of count of Ribagorza by his father John II in Monzón, (Note: «Being held to king to the court of the Aragonese in the town of Monzon on 27 of November of this year 1469, as to own county of Ribagorza on behalf of his son the King of Sicily [or the former Count of Ribagorza and helpful county gentleman][...] donated to his son Don Alonso de Aragón of that county, entitled count, with the consent and will of the entire county.[...] and had his predecessors, for him and his legitimate children." Alonso de Aragón, the third of its name in the Ribagorzana line, was the bastard son of King John II of Aragon and Leonor de Escobar.Costa 2001, p. 275) and resigned on November 27, 1469, to be succeeded by his first son Fernando.

He fought in the War of the Castilian Succession. Capture of the Catalan castle of Amposta gave him fame during the war. He again led a group of skilled siege engineers in the Siege of Burgos in 1475.

In 1475 he was named Duke of Villahermosa by his father John II of Aragon as a reward for his loyalty and military value.

Alfonso of Aragon and Escobar died in Linares in 1485, not long after making to Pizarra, Málaga.

== Marriage and children ==
In 1477 Alfonso married with Leonor de Sotomayor of Portugal, daughter of Juan de Sotomayor and Isabel of Portugal with whom he had three children:

- Fernando de Aragón y de Sotomayor (1478–1481)
- Alfonso de Aragón y de Sotomayor (1479–1513)
- María de Aragón y de Sotomayor (Zaragoza, 1485 – Piombino, 1513), wife of Roberto Sanseverino II who was widowed in 1510 and remarried with Jacopo V Appiani, Lord of Piombino es:Principality of Piombino.

The premature death of his eldest legitimate son, Fernando, at the age of three years in 1481, would make the duchy passed to the second son of the marriage: Alfonso, who would inherit the duchy at 6 years in 1485.

He also had five extramarital children:

With María Junquers, daughter of Mosen Gregorio de Junquers,

- Juan II de Ribagorza (1457–1528), Duke of Luna (Note: The Duchy of Luna is a Spanish noble title created in 1495 by the King of Aragon, Fernando II, in favor of his nephew, Juan Jose de Aragon and Sotomayor, 4th count of Ribagorza, Viceroy of Naples and Catalonia.)
- Leonor de Aragon, married to Jaime de Mila and became the first Marquess of Albayda.

with Estenga Conejo (or Maria Sanchez Conejo):

- Alfonso de Aragón y Sánchez (1455-1514), Bishop of Tortosa and President of the Generalitat of Catalonia.
- Ferran de Aragon y Conejo, Prior of Catalonia.

with Catalina de Maldonado

- Enric de Aragon (? - 1509). Abbot of Santa Maria de Alaó.

== See also ==
- Duke of Villahermosa
- Order of Calatrava
- List of grand masters of the Order of Calatrava

== Bibliography ==
- Navarro Latorre, José (1982). "Don Alonso de Aragón, la "espada" o "lanza" de Juan II (Alonso de Aragón: "Sword " or "Spear" of John II)" (PDF). Revista de Historia Jerónimo Zurita (41–42): 159–204. ISSN 0214-0993. Archived from the original on 2013-07-18.
- Carnicer, José Soler (1985). Nuestras tierras (Our Lands). Vol. 1. Valencia: Vicente García. ISBN 84-85094-39-5.
- Menache, Sophia (1987). "Una personificación del ideal caballeresco en el medievo tardío: Don Alonso de Aragón (A Personification of the Chivalric Ideal in the Late Middle Ages: Alonso de Aragón)" (PDF). Anales de la Universidad de Alicante. Historia Medieval (6). doi:10.14198/medieval.1987.6.01. ISSN 0212-2480.
- Costa, Manuel Iglesias (2001). Historia del condado de Ribagorza (History of Ribagorza County) (PDF). Huesca: Instituto de Estudios Altoaragoneses. Archived from the original on 14 September 2014.
