= Duke of Palata =

Dukedom of Spain

Dukedom of Palata
- Creation date: 20 May 1646
- Created by: Philip IV
- Peerage: Peerage of Spain
- First holder: Francisco Toralto de Aragón, 1st Duke of Palata
- Present holder: Alfonso Urzáiz y Azlor de Aragón, 12th Duke of Palata
- Heir apparent: Ignacio Urzáiz y Larrauri

Duke of Palata (Spanish: Duque de Palata) is a hereditary title in the peerage of Spain, accompanied by the dignity of Grandee and granted in 1646 by Philip IV to Francisco Toralto de Aragón, a paternal descendant of Alfonso V of Aragon. The title makes reference to the town of Palata in Campobasso, Italy, where Toraldo's father held a fiefdom.

The 2nd Duchess of Palata was married to Melchor de Navarra, who was viceroy of Peru. He was also known as the Duke of Palata (iure uxoris).

At the death with no descendants of the 10th Duchess in 1905, the title became vacant for about 80 years. In an effort to recover all of her dormant titles, Palata was rehabilitated in 1986 by Juan Carlos I on behalf of María del Pilar Azlor de Aragón y Guillamas, a granddaughter of the 10th Duchess' brother, who was already the 18th Duchess of Villahermosa (the family's main title) since 1962.

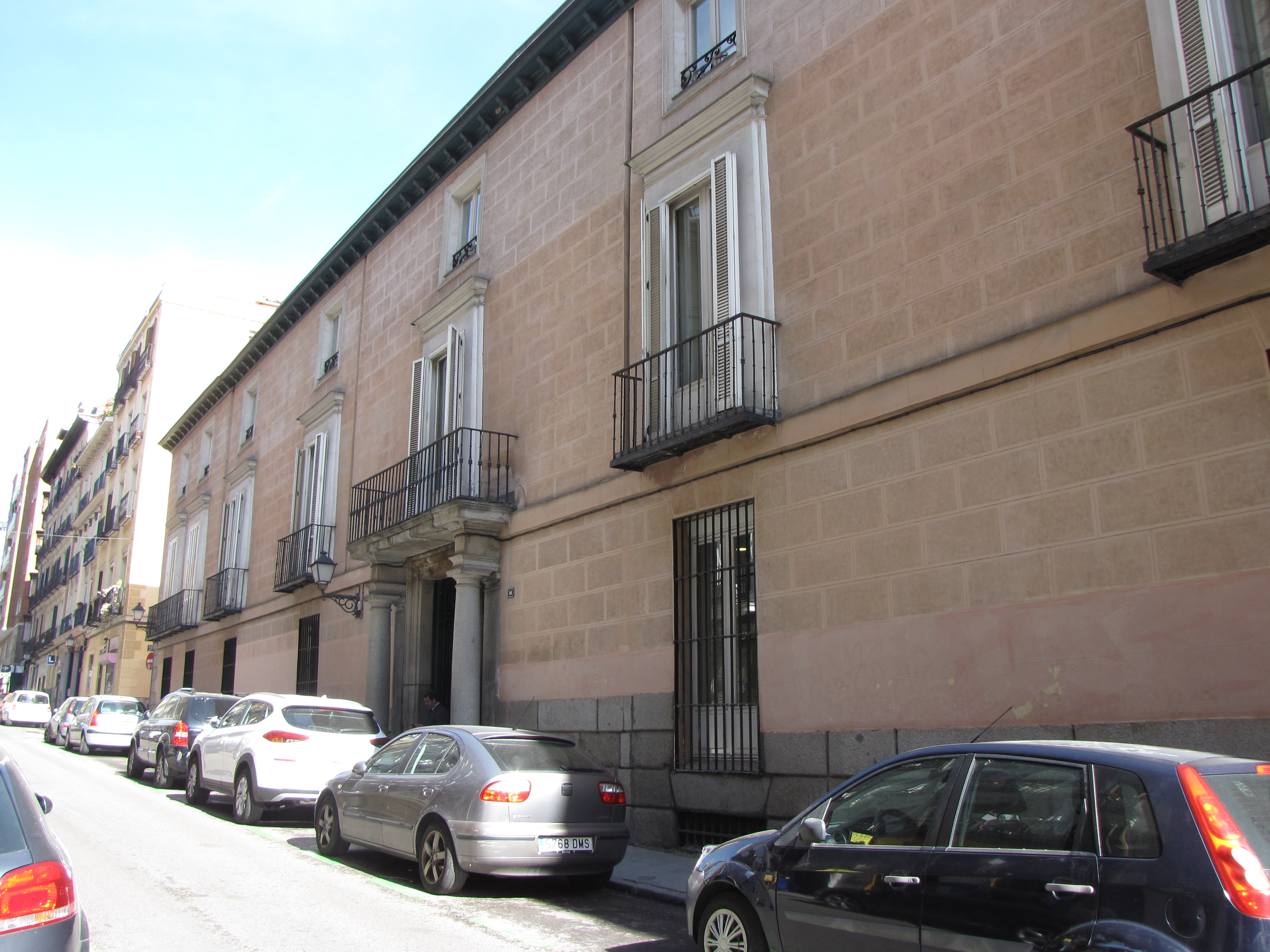
Palace of Santa Cruz, home of the current Dukes of Palata in Madrid

== Dukes of Palata ==
=== 1646 ===
- Francisco Toralto de Aragón, 1st Duke of Palata (1585-1647)
- Francisca Toralto de Aragón y Frezza, 2nd Duchess of Palata (1647-1724), daughter of the 1st Duke
- Antonio Melchor Fernández de Híjar y Navarra de Aragón, 3rd Duke of Palata (d. 1734), grandson of the 2nd Duchess
- Francisco Antonio Zapata de Calatayud y Fernández de Híjar, 4th Duke of Palata (d. 1754), nephew of the 3rd Duke
- María Agustina Zapata de Calatayud y Fernández de Híjar, 5th Duchess of Palata (d. 1784), sister of the 4th Duke
- Juan Pablo de Aragón-Azlor y Zapata de Calatayud, 6th Duke of Palata (1730-1790), nephew of the 5th Duchess
- Víctor Amadeo de Aragón-Azlor y Pignatelli, 7th Duke of Palata (1779-1792), son of the 6th Duke
- José Antonio de Aragón-Azlor y Pignatelli, 8th Duke of Palata (1785-1852), brother of the 7th Duke
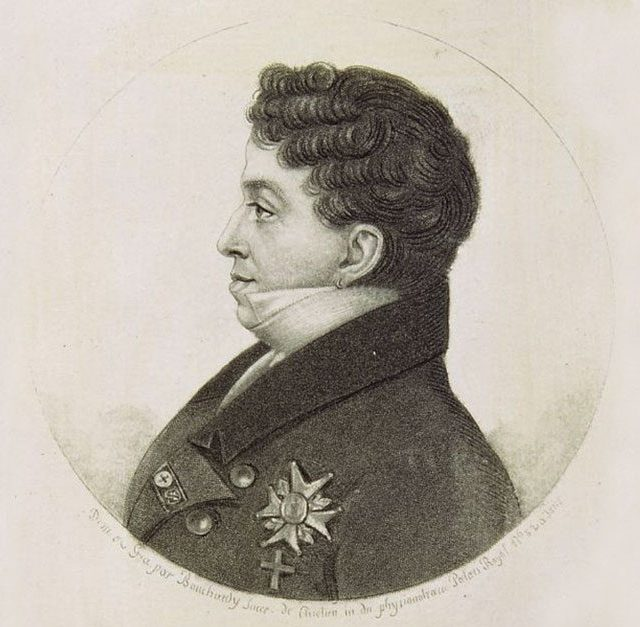
  The 8th Duke by Valentín Carderera, c. 1865
- Marcelino Pedro de Aragón-Azlor y Fernández de Córdoba, 9th Duke of Palata (1815-1888), son of the 8th Duke
- María del Carmen de Aragón-Azlor e Idiázquez, 10th Duchess of Palata (1841-1905), daughter of the 9th Duke

=== 1986 ===
- María del Pilar Azlor de Aragón y Guillamas, 11th Duchess of Palata (1908-1996), great-granddaughter of the 9th Duke
- Alfonso Urzáiz y Azlor de Aragón, 12th Duke of Palata (b. 1944), youngest son of the 11th Duchess

The heir apparent is the present holder's only son, Ignacio Urzáiz y Larrauri (b. 1998).

== See also ==
- List of dukes in the peerage of Spain
- List of current grandees of Spain

== Bibliography ==
- Hidalgos de España, Real Asociación de (2018). Elenco de Grandezas y Títulos Nobiliarios Españoles. Ediciones Hidalguía. ISBN 978-84-94841-02-6.
