= Willem van Enckevoirt =

Dutch cardinal (1464–1534)

His Eminence William of Enckevoirt
- Cardinal Bishop of Utrecht
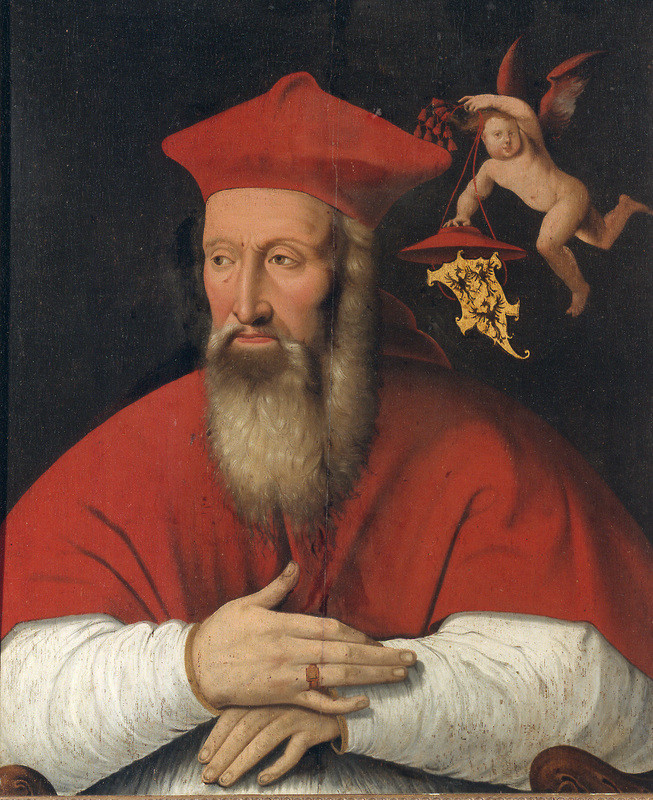
- Church: Roman Catholic
- Appointed: 1 October 1529
- Term ended: 19 July 1534
- Predecessor: Henry of the Palatinate
- Successor: George van Egmond
- Previous posts: 1523–1534 Bishop of Tortosa; 1529–1534 Bishop of Utrecht; 1523–1534 Cardinal-priest of St. John and Paul

Orders
- Created cardinal: 10 September 1523 by Pope Adrian VI

Personal details
- Born: 22 January 1464
- Died: 19 July 1534 (aged 70) Rome, Papal States
- Buried: Santa Maria dell'Anima, Rome; 41°53′59.1″N 12°28′19.3″E
- Coat of arms

William of Enckevoirt, also spelled as Enckenvoirt (22 January 1464 in Mierlo-Hout – 19 July 1534 in Rome) was a Dutch Cardinal, bishop of Tortosa from 1524 to 1524, and bishop of Utrecht from 1529 to 1534.

== Biography ==
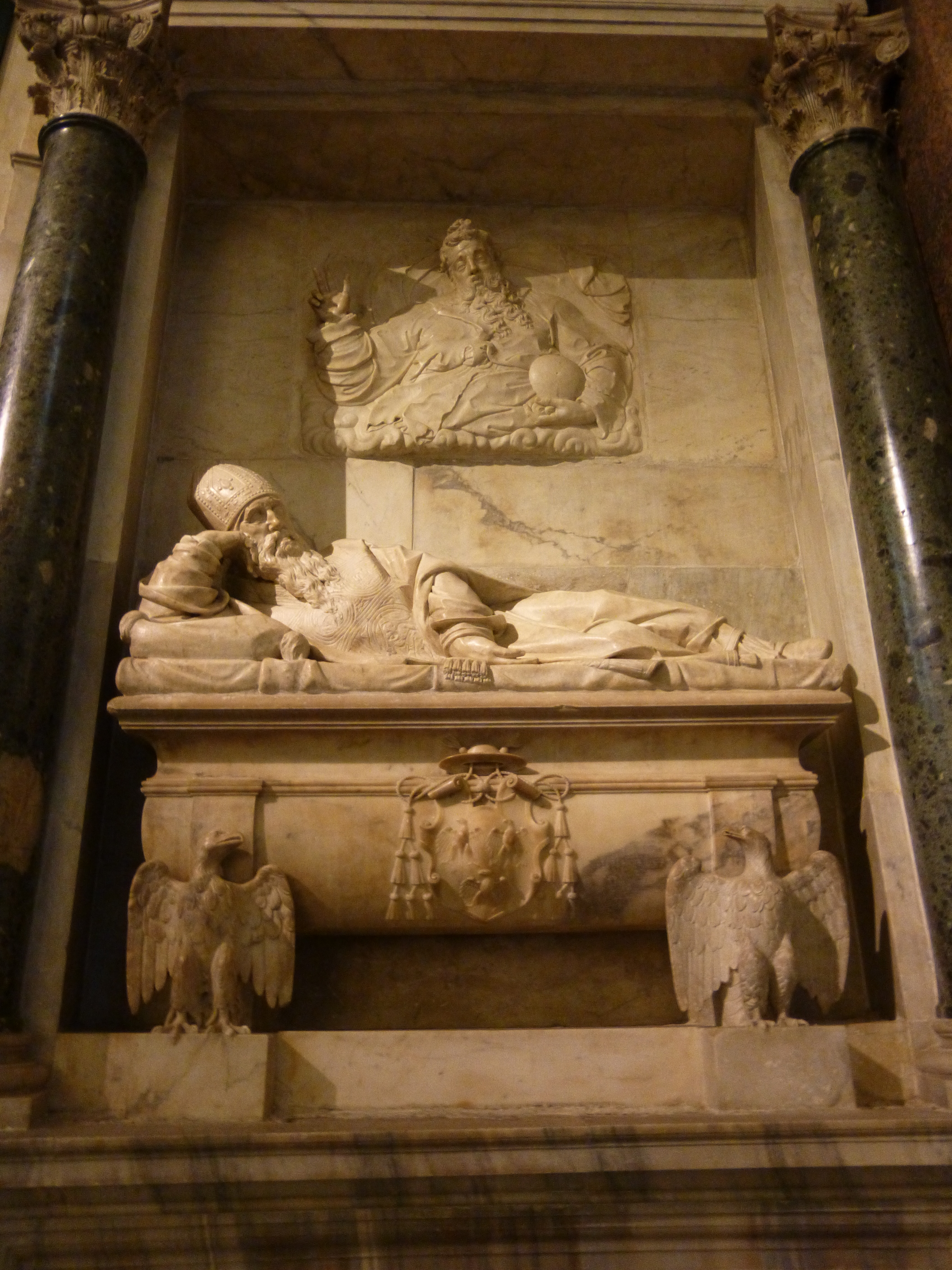
Tomb of Cardinal Willem van Enckevoirt at Santa Maria dell'Anima in Rome

Enckevoirt was the son of a farmer, Willem van Enckevoirt Sr., and aspired to a career in the church. He studied at Leuven, where he probably studied under Adriaan Boeyens, the later Pope Adrian VI. In 1489 he was sent to Rome, where he continued his studies at the Sapienza, and he achieved his Licentiate in 1505.

In 1495 William entered the papal court, and he collected many prebends, so that he collected the income of parishes without actually being there, an accepted practice in those days. He represented the interests of the parishes in Rome. He also managed to obtain high posts in Rome for several of his family members.

Through the election of Pope Adrian VI in 1522 his influence further increased, and together with Theodoricus Hezius he was a personal confidant of the pope. Before pope Adrian died, one of his last requests was that William be made cardinal. Some cardinals opposed this, but Adrian pushed his decision through and William was created Cardinal-priest of St. John and Paul on 10 September 1523. He was only the second cardinal ever created from the northern Netherlands, and the only cardinal created during Adrian's short reign.

After the death of Adrian in 1523, William of Enckevoirt maintained his high positions and continued his involvement in politics, such as the transfer of all lands of the Bishopric of Utrecht to Charles V, Holy Roman Emperor, and the crowning of Charles V as emperor in 1530. During the 1527 sacking of Rome by imperial troops, he paid 40,000 scudi to Captain Odone to protect his house and properties. In 1529 he was appointed bishop of Utrecht by pope Clement VII, but he was hardly ever there; he last visited the Netherlands in 1532.

William, who was the executor of Adrian VI's will, took the initiative in erecting a funerary monument for him in Santa Maria dell'Anima. The monument was designed by Baldassare Peruzzi and included William's name and arms. He also financed the decoration of the Barbara chapel in this church by painter Michiel Coxcie.

William of Enckevoirt died on 19 July 1534. His monument, created by Giovanni Mangone, was originally located opposite of Adrian VI's tomb, but it was moved in 1575. It is still visible next to the main entrance of the church.

While cardinal, he was the principal consecrator of: Pedro Malgareso, Bishop of Dulcigno (1529); Bernardino de Soria, Bishop of Ravello (1529); and Miguel Torcella, Bishop of Alife (1533).

== Bibliography ==
Notes

References

- P.J. Block and P.C. Molhuysen (1912), Nieuw Nederlandsch biographisch woordenboek(NNBW), deel 2. Free digitalised version (in Dutch)

Catholic Church titles
Preceded by Adriaan Florenszoon Boeyens	Bishop of Tortosa; 1523–1534	Succeeded by Antonio Calcena
Preceded by Adriaan Florenszoon Boeyens	Cardinal priest of Ss. Giovanni e Paolo; 1523–1534	Succeeded by Esteban Gabriel Merino
Preceded by Henry of the Palatinate	Bishop of Utrecht; 1529–1534	Succeeded by George van Egmond
