= Duke of Villahermosa =

Dukedom of Spain

Dukedom of Villahermosa
- Creation date: 1476
- Created by: John II
- Peerage: Peerage of Spain
- First holder: Alfonso de Aragón y Escobar, 1st Duke of Villahermosa
- Present holder: Álvaro Urzáiz y Azlor de Aragón, 19th Duke of Villahermosa
- Former seat: Palace of Villahermosa

Duke of Villahermosa (Spanish: Duque de Villahermosa) is a hereditary title in the peerage of Spain, accompanied by the dignity of Grandee and granted in 1476 by John II to Alfonso de Aragón, a half-brother of Ferdinand II.

The ducal family's fortunes grew in the mid-15th century, after Pedrola became the Aragonese capital at the time when the Azlor de Aragón family estates and Villahermosa were controlled by Alfonso de Aragón y de Escobar, illegitimate son of King John II of Aragon.

This noble family owned the Palace of Villahermosa in Madrid, a neo-classical building on the corner of Paseo del Prado and Calle de San Jerónimo, from the 18th century until the 20th century. Refurbished by Rafael Moneo in the late 1980s, the former ducal townhouse now houses Madrid's Thyssen-Bornemisza Museum.

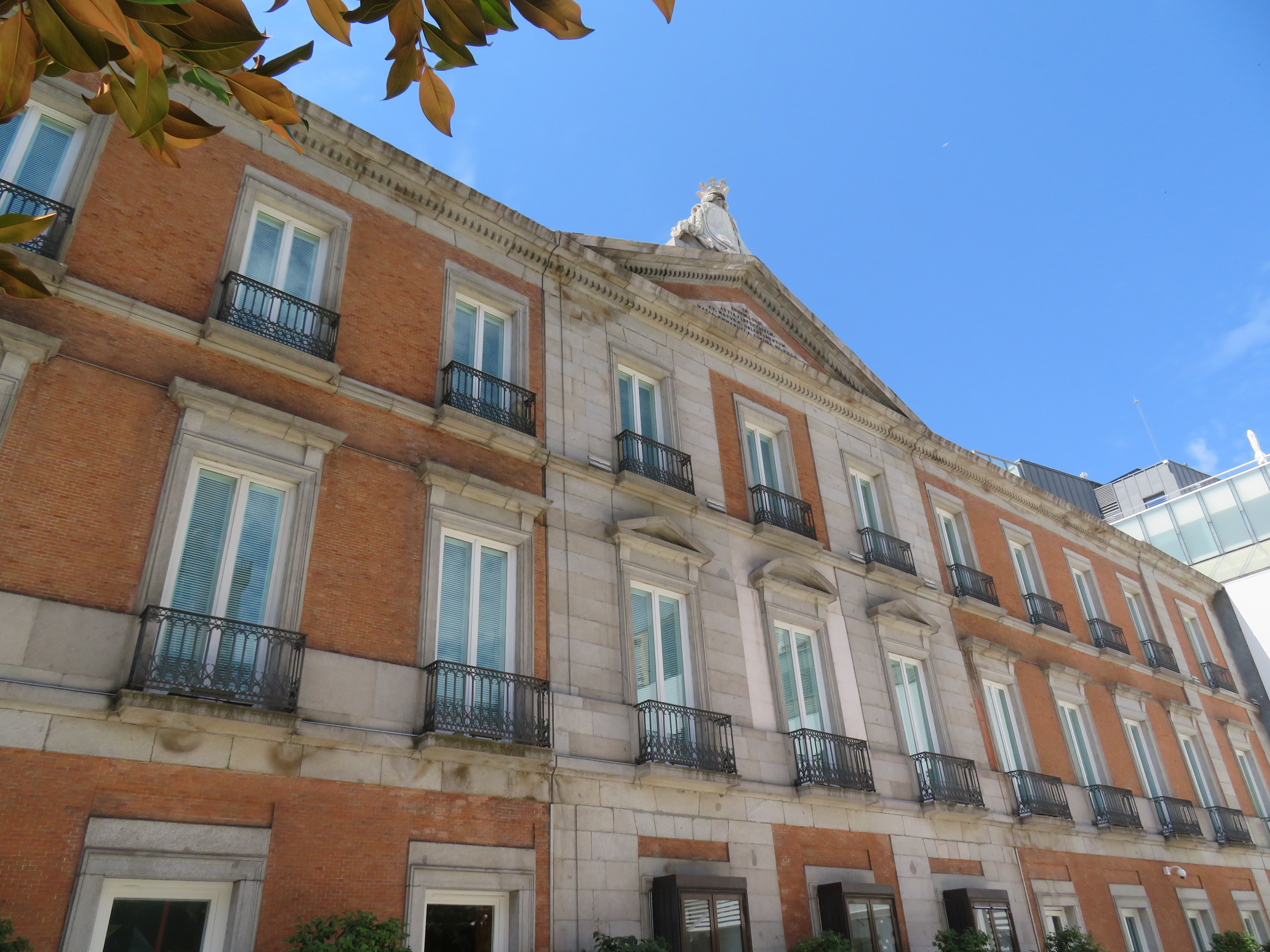
Palace of Villahermosa, now the Thyssen-Bornemisza Museum, Madrid

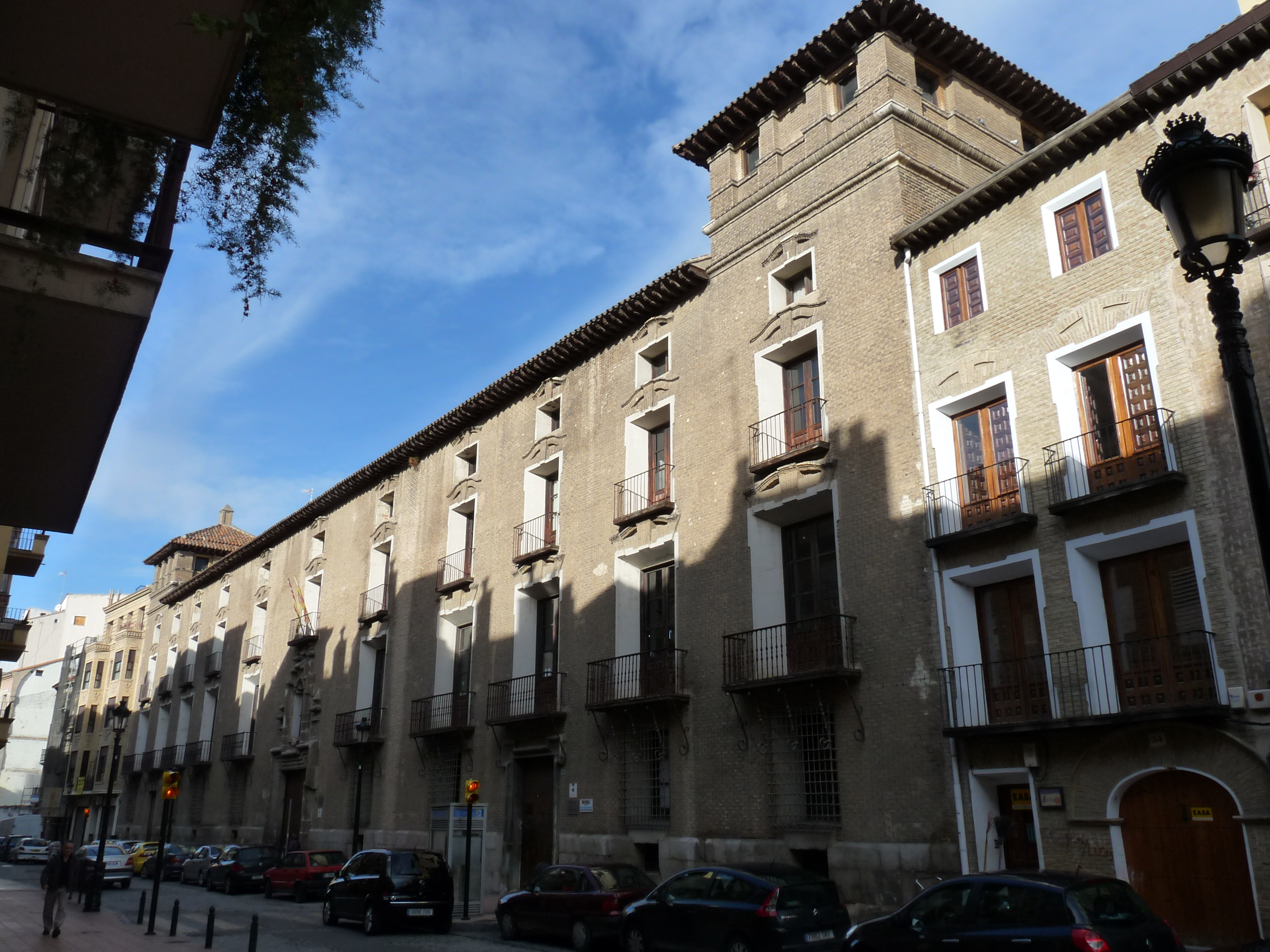
Palace of the Dukes of Villahermosa in Zaragoza, Spain

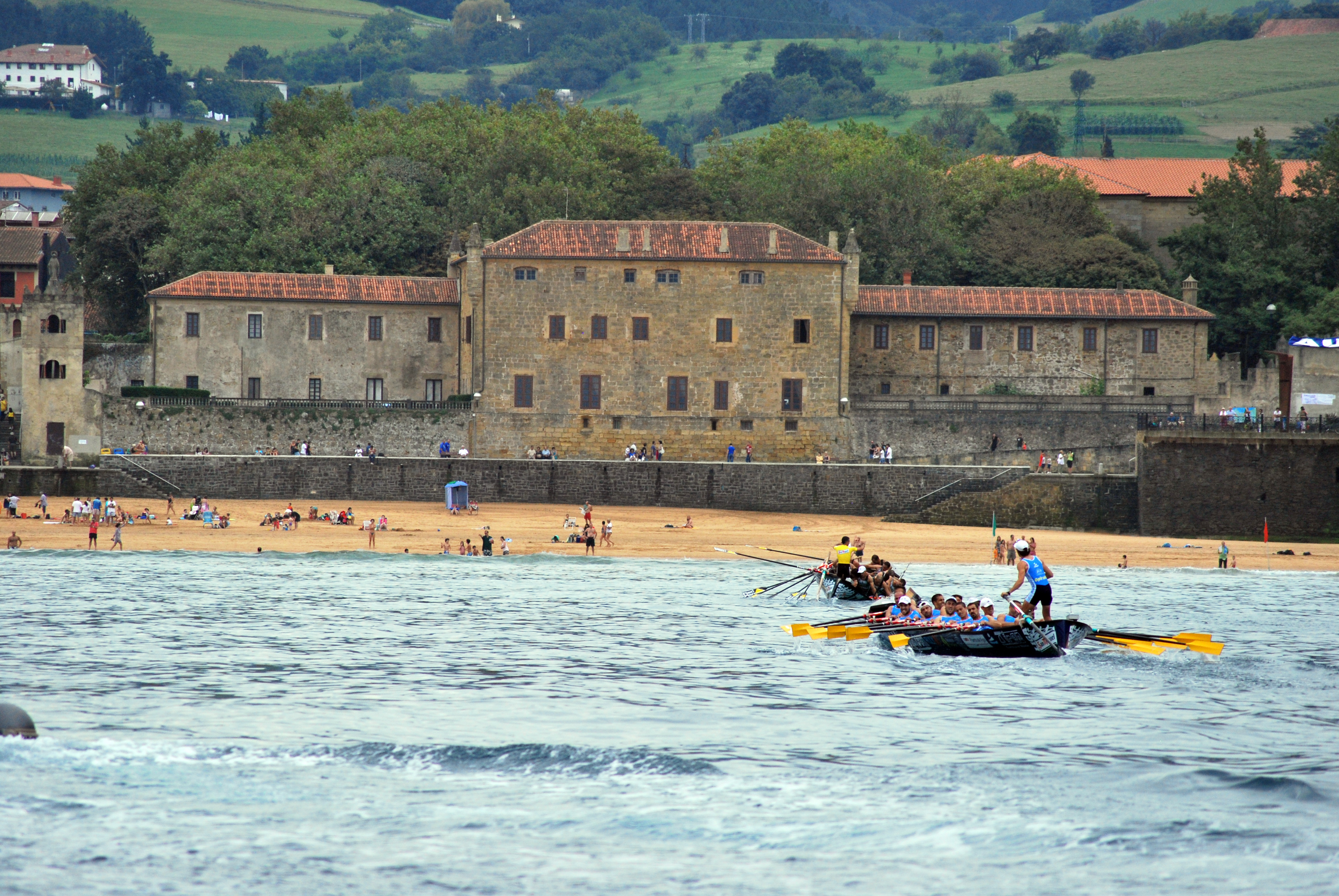
Narros, the summer house of the Dukes in Zarautz, Spain

== List of dukes of Villahermosa ==
- Alfonso de Aragón y de Escobar (1417–1495), created Count of Cortes in 1462 by Queen Bianca of Navarre and later Count of Ribagorza in 1469, was advanced as 1st Duke of Villahermosa in 1476; married in 1477, Leonor de Sotomayor; in addition to illegitimate offspring, he had two sons and one daughter (Fernando (died 1483), Alfonso and Mariana), and was succeeded by his younger son:
- Alfonso de Aragón y Sotomayor (1479–1513), 2nd Duke of Villahermosa: one illegitimate daughter, Leonor; succeeded by his sister.
- Ferdinando Sanseverino y de Aragón (18 January 1507 – 1572), 4th Prince of Salerno (s. 1508) and 3rd Duke of Villahermosa (s. 1513). Was exiled in France from 1554 because King Charles I attainted him, forfeiting his titles and lands in Spain and Italy because of his services to the French Crown. The 4th Duke's sister was Laura Sanseverino de Aragón who married the Italo-Spanish condottiero, Ignacio de Avalos, 1st Marquess del Vasto.
- Martín de Gurrea y Aragón (Pedrola, 1525–Zaragoza, 1581), 3rd Duke of Luna, 4th Duke of Villahermosa succeeded his cousin Ferdinando Sanseverino y de Aragón in 1554 by Royal Decree of King Charles I; he married at Medina Sidonia, in 1541, Luisa de Borja, (Gandía, 1529 - Zaragoza, 1560).
- Fernando de Aragón y Borja, 5th Duke of Villahermosa (1546–1592).
- Francisco de Aragón y Borja, Count of Luna, 6th Duke of Villahermosa (dukedom attainted).
- Maria Luisa de Aragón, 7th Duchess of Villahermosa (1603–1663).
- Fernando Manuel de Aragón, 8th Duke of Villahermosa (1663–1665).
- Carlos de Aragón de Gurrea y de Borja, 9th Duke of Villahermosa (1665–1692).
- José Claudio de Aragón y Gurrea de Castro Pinós, 10th Duke of Villahermosa (1697–1761).
- Juan Pablo de Aragón-Azlor y Zapata de Calatayud, 7th Duke of Palata, 11th Duke of Villahermosa (Pedrola, 1730–Madrid, 1790).
- Víctor Amadeo de Aragón-Azlor y Pignatelli de Aragón, 8th Duke of Palata, 12th Duke of Villahermosa (1779–1792).
- José António de Aragón Azlor y Pignatelli de Aragón, 9th Duke of Palata, 13th Duke of Villahermosa (1785–1852).
- Marcelino Pedro de Aragón Azlor y Fernández de Córdoba, 14th Duke of Villahermosa (1815–1888).
- Maria del Cármen de Aragón-Azlor y Idiáquez, 15th Duchess of Villahermosa (1841–1905).
- Francisco-Xavier de Aragón-Azlor de Idíaquez, 16th Duke of Villahermosa (1842–1919).
- José Antonio Azlor de Aragón y Hurtado de Zaldivar, 17th Duke of Villahermosa (1873–1960).
- Maria del Pilar Azlor de Aragón y Guillamas, 10th Duchess of Palata, 18th Duchess of Villahermosa (1908–1997).
- Álvaro de Urzáiz y Azlor de Aragón, 19th Duke of Villahermosa (1937–present).

== See also ==
- List of current grandees of Spain
- Palace of Villahermosa

== Bibliography ==
- Hidalgos de España, Real Asociación de (2018). Elenco de Grandezas y Títulos Nobiliarios Españoles. Ediciones Hidalguía. ISBN 978-84-94841-02-6.
