= Gonzalo Fernández de Heredia =

Spanish politician

Fernández de Heredia was the scribe of the manuscript Morgan M 244, a volume of Latin translations of Xenophon and Onasander copied at Florence around 1470

Gonzalo Fernández de Heredia y de Bardají (c. 1450 – 21 November 1511) was an Aragonese monk, bishop, politician and diplomat. He was bishop-elect of Segorbe-Albarracín, then Bishop of Barcelona (1478–1490) and Archbishop of Tarragona (1490–1511). He also served as President of the Government of Catalonia (1504–1506).

Gonzalo was born in Mora de Rubielos around 1450, the son of Juan Fernández de Heredia and Juana Bardají de Pinós. He studied canon law at the University of Pisa in 1473–1474. He worked as a scribe in Florence in 1475–1476 and 1478 and possibly earlier. There are about 23 books signed by a 'Gundisalvus Hispanus' who is believed to be Gonzalo. These included copies made for Lorenzo de' Medici and Matthias Corvinus.

Gonzalo was appointed Bishop of Barcelona on 8 June 1479. He was later in Rome as Ferdinand II of Aragon's ambassador to the Holy See, during which time Pope Innocent VIII made him Archbishop of Tarragona on 13 June 1490. On the election of Pope Alexander VI he was made captain of the palace guard and later governor of Rome. He left the Papal See for Naples in 1494 to become a counsellor to king Ferdinand's widow Joanna of Aragon. On 21 June 1500 he returned to his cathedral church, residing at San Miguel de Escornalbou Monastery, La Selva del Camp and Valls. He died in Valls in 1511.

Catholic Church titles
Preceded by Rodrigo de Borja	Bishop of Barcelona; 1478–1490	Succeeded by Pedro García
Preceded by Pedro de Urrea	Archbishop of Tarragona; 1490–1511	Succeeded by Alfonso de Aragón y Sánchez
