= Jaime de Conchillos =

Roman Catholic priest

Most Reverend Jaime de Conchillos
- Prelate of Santa Lucia del Mela
- Church: Catholic Church
- Diocese: Diocese of Lérida
- In office: 1512–1542
- Predecessor: Juan de Enguera
- Successor: Martín Valero Cuesta
- Previous posts: Prelate of Santa Lucia del Mela (1505); Bishop of Gerace (1505–1509); Bishop of Catania (1509–1512)

Personal details
- Died: 4 August 1542 Lérida, Spain

Jaime de Conchillos, O. de M. (died 4 Aug 1542) was a Roman Catholic priest who served as Bishop of Lérida (1512–1542), Bishop of Catania (1509–1512), Bishop of Gerace (1505–1509), and Prelate of Santa Lucia del Mela (1505).

== Biography ==
Jaime de Conchillos was ordained a priest in the Order of the Blessed Virgin Mary of Mercy and in 1505, he was appointed by Pope Julius II as Prelate of Santa Lucia del Mela. On 23 Feb 1505, he was appointed by Pope Julius II as Bishop of Gerace. On 25 Feb 1509, he was appointed by Pope Julius II as Bishop of Catania. On 1 Oct 1512, he was appointed by Pope Julius II as Bishop of Lérida where he served until his death on 4 Aug 1542.

== See also ==
- Catholic Church in Spain

== External links and additional sources ==
- Cheney, David M. "Territorial Prelature of Santa Lucia del Mela". Catholic-Hierarchy.org. (for Chronology of Bishops) ^{[self-published]}
- Chow, Gabriel. "Territorial Prelature of Santa Lucia del Mela (Italy)". GCatholic.org. (for Chronology of Bishops) ^{[self-published]}
- Cheney, David M. "Diocese of Locri-Gerace (-Santa Maria di Polsi)". Catholic-Hierarchy.org.(for Chronology of Bishops) ^{[self-published]}
- Chow, Gabriel. "Diocese of Locri–Gerace (Italy)". GCatholic.org. (for Chronology of Bishops) ^{[self-published]}
- Cheney, David M. "Archdiocese of Catania". Catholic-Hierarchy.org. (for Chronology of Bishops) ^{[self-published]}
- Chow, Gabriel. "Metropolitan Archdiocese of Catania". GCatholic.org. (for Chronology of Bishops) ^{[self-published]}
- Cheney, David M. "Diocese of Lleida". Catholic-Hierarchy.org. (for Chronology of Bishops) ^{[self-published]}
- Chow, Gabriel. "Diocese of Lleida (Spain)". GCatholic.org. (for Chronology of Bishops) ^{[self-published]}

Catholic Church titles
Preceded by	Prelate of Santa Lucia del Mela; 1505	Succeeded by
Preceded by	Bishop of Gerace; 1505–1509	Succeeded by Bandinello Sauli
Preceded by Diego Ramírez de Guzmán	Bishop of Catania; 1509–1512	Succeeded by Gaspar Ponz
Preceded by Juan de Enguera	Bishop of Lérida; 1512–1542	Succeeded by Martín Valero Cuesta
