= Alfons d'Aragó =

Spanish Bishop and politician (1455-1514)

Alfons d'Aragó or Alfonso de Aragón y Sánchez (Valencia, 1455 – Tarragona, 26 August 1514) was Bishop of Tortosa (1475–1512), President of the Generalitat de Catalunya (1500–1503) and Archbishop of Tarragona (1513–1514).

== Biography ==
He was the illegitimate son of Alfonso VI de Ribagorza, himself an illegitimate son of King John II of Aragón, and Estenga Conejo (or Sanchez). He was thus a nephew of Ferdinand II (King 1479–1516). He was the half-brother of Juan II de Ribagorza, president of the Generalitat in the period 1512–1515.

He was appointed Bishop of Tortosa by Pope Sixtus IV in 1475 when he was twenty years old. He took the oath of office on 19 July 1476 before Pero Ximénez de Urrea, Archbishop of Tarragona. Absent almost continuously from his bishopric, from 1485 he habitually resided in Valencia, where he built his residence, to which he granted territorial jurisdiction to be able to administer the bishopric from there.

He was appointed president of the Generalitat on 22 July 1500.

In October 1512, and through the intercession of his uncle Ferdinand the Catholic, he replaced Gonzalo Fernández de Heredia who died in 1511, at the head of the Archbishopric of Tarragona. He only had a short term as Archbishop, as he died on 26 August 1514.
