= Siege of Burgos (1475) =

Siege in Spain

- Part of War of the Castilian Succession
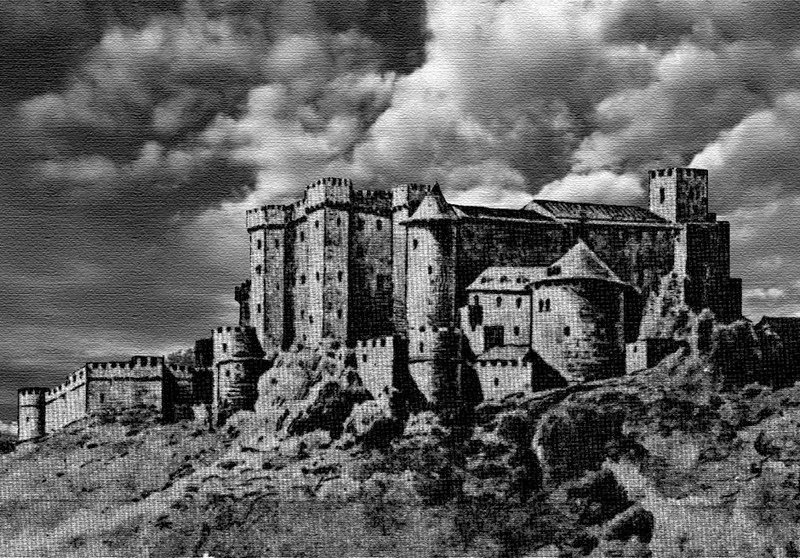
- Engraving of the Castle of Burgos from the work Civitates Orbis Terrarum (by Braun & Hogenberg) of 1576
Date	1475–early 1476
Location	Castle of Burgos
Result	Isabella and Aragon victory

Belligerents
Isabella Supporters; Crown of Aragon	Juana Supporters; Kingdom of Portugal

Commanders and leaders
Isabella I of Castile; Pedro González de Mendoza; Ferdinand II of Aragon; Alfonso of Aragon	Juan de Stúñiga; Afonso V of Portugal

The siege of Burgos was a siege of the castle of Burgos in the Kingdom of Castile between 1475 and early 1476. It was part of the War of the Castilian Succession. Isabella's supporters and the Aragonese successfully besieged the castle, which was held by Joanna's (Juana) supporters and the Portuguese.

== Siege ==
In August and September 1475 Queen Isabella I of Castille had strengthened garrisons near the city of Burgos while her husband Ferdinand II of Aragon besieged the city's fortress. The fortress was armed with large Lombard guns that bombarded the city, which had pledged to support Isabella.

The queen's forces harassed King Afonso V of Portugal troops, and managed to cut their supply lines. After learning that the road north from Peñafiel was cut, the Portuguese turned back. Consequently, the Portuguese retreated back to Toro and moved to Zamora in October for the winter. These actions prevented the Portuguese from relieving the besieged castle garrison.

By the end of November 1475, King Ferdinand's brother Alfonso of Aragon arrived with skilled siege engineers. He had gained fame for capturing the Catalan castle of Amposta.

King Ferdinand II could not be present when the Burgos garrison surrendered, as he held the siege of Zamora so important that his presence was required there. He left for Zamora in early December. The city had fallen quickly, but the castle of Zamora was retained by the Portuguese. As the king had left, Queen Isabella was tasked with receiving the surrender of Burgos.

The city's fortress surrendered after nine months. Tunnelers had cut off the water supply, and the garrison asked for surrender terms ten days later, on 2 December 1475. After a customary truce of two months, the besieging force was to take control of the fortress. However, commander (alcaide) of the garrison Juan de Stúñiga surrendered early on 19 January, and was commended for his valor before his dismissal by Isabella. This act made his father switch sides to Isabella. Cardinal Mendoza, usually part of Queen Isabella's retinue, had overseen the final negotiations, and by 2 February 1476 the queen could visit the fortress.

== Aftermath ==
The fall of Burgos was one of the first major victories against Joanna la Beltraneja. The city of Burgos was a necessary asset for controlling the Kingdom of Castile. The troops tasked with besieging Burgos were sent westward to join the action in Toro and Zamora.

== Military history ==
The siege of Burgos was one of the last military engagements that saw the use of trebuchets, as gunpowder weaponry such as cannons became increasingly common, and the siege is one of the last known references to their use. During the siege, bombards were used alongside trebuchets.

== See also ==
- House of Zúñiga, the garrison commander belonged to this noble lineage
- Siege of Burgos (1812)
