= Víctor Damián Sáez =

Spanish priest and politician (1776–1839)

Víctor Damián Sáez

Víctor Damián Sáez Sánchez Mayor (1776–1839) was a Spanish priest and politician, canon of Sigüenza, of Toledo, bishop of Tortosa and private confessor of King Ferdinand VII.

In 1823, the King appointed Sáez as Secretary of State (prime minister) and he was the first prime minister to chair the newly created Council of Ministers in 1823, post he held briefly, from 19 August to 2 December of that year.

== Biography ==
Born in Budia, Guadalajara, on 12 April 1776, Sáez first came to the King's attention in 1819 when, having been canon of Sigüenza, had then become canon of Toledo, where he read the eulogy at the funeral for the King's mother, Maria Luisa of Parma. Sáez was appointed confessor to the King shortly thereafter.

Deeply linked to the ultra-absolutist sectors, Sáez was King Ferdinand VII's trusted person. During the Liberal Triennium (1820–1823), Ferdinand was forced by the progressive forces to push him away but after the fall of the constitutional regimen in 1823, Sáez returned to the circles of power. In August 1823, the absolutist Regency appointed him Acting First Secretary of State (acting prime minister), a position that allowed him to command the absolutist reaction to the constitutional government of the Liberal Triennium. He did so with such rigor that more moderate absolutists such as Carlos Martínez de Irujo, 1st Marquess of Casa Irujo, requested the King to dismiss Sáez in the name of the powers of the Holy Alliance, the members of which coincided in considering Sáez's increasing influence over the King the main impediment to calming the waters in the country.

On the same day the King was reinstated, 1 October 1823, the monarch ratified his confessor as Minister of State. On November 19, King Ferdinand issued a decree addressed to Sáez, ratifying him as prime minister and creating the Council of Ministers. When the King arrived in Madrid on 2 December, and forced by foreign protests in the face of the intensity and extreme harshness with which Sáez had dedicated himself to persecuting progressive elements, Ferdinand dismissed Sáez as prime minister, and as the King's confessor. Sáez was appointed bishop of Tortosa, post he took up in August 1824.

After the death of the King in 1833, Sáez was accused of favoring the King's brother's aspirations to seize the throne from three-year-old Queen Isabella II.

Having abandoned Madrid, with permission, due to the 1833–34 outbreak of cholera, he later ignored a royal decree ordering him back to the capital and was declared an outlaw in May 1837. Stripped of his posts and honours, Sáez took refuge in Sigüenza, where he remained hidden until his death, on 3 February 1839, following a fit of apoplexy.

After the end of the First Carlist War, his nephew returned to Sigüenza to give a dignified burial to the mortal remains of his uncle and Sáez was buried in Tortosa Cathedral.
