= Diets of Nuremberg =

Assembly of princes or estates in Nuremberg in the 17c

The Diets of Nuremberg, also called the Imperial Diets of Nuremberg, took place at different times between the Middle Ages and the 17th century.

The first Diet of Nuremberg, in 1211, elected the future emperor Frederick II of Hohenstaufen as German king.

At the Diet of 1356 the Emperor Charles IV issued the Golden Bull of 1356, which required each Holy Roman Emperor to summon the first Imperial Diet after his election at Nuremberg. Apart from that, a number of other diets were held there.

Important to Protestantism were the Diets of 1522 ("First Diet of Nuremberg"), 1524 ("Second Diet of Nuremberg") and 1532 ("Third Diet of Nuremberg").

== The 1522 Diet of Nuremberg ==
This Diet has become known mostly for the reaction of the papacy to the decision made on Luther at the Diet of Worms the previous year. The new pope, Adrian VI, sent his nuncio Francesco Chieregati to the Diet, to insist both that the Edict of Worms be executed and that action be taken promptly against Luther. This demand, however, was coupled with a promise of thorough reform in the Roman hierarchy, frankly admitting the partial guilt of the Vatican in the decline of the Church.

In the recess drafted on 9 February 1523, however, the German princes rejected this appeal. Using Adrian's admissions, they declared that they could not have it appear 'as though they wished to oppress evangelical truth and assist unchristian and evil abuses.'

== The 1524 Diet of Nuremberg ==
This Diet generally took the same line as the previous one. The Estates reiterated their decision from the previous Diet. The Cardinal-legate, Campeggio, who was present, showed his disgust at the behaviour of the Estates. On 18 April, the Estates decided to call 'a general gathering of the German nation', to meet at Speyer the following year and to decide what would be done until the meeting of the general council of the Church which they demanded. This resulted in the Diet of Speyer (1526), which in turn was followed by the Diet of Speyer (1529). The latter included the Protestation at Speyer.

== Sources ==
- Karl Brandi, The Emperor Charles V (1939), pp. 185–188
