= Pope Adrian VI =

Head of the Catholic Church from 1522 to 1523

- Bishop of Rome
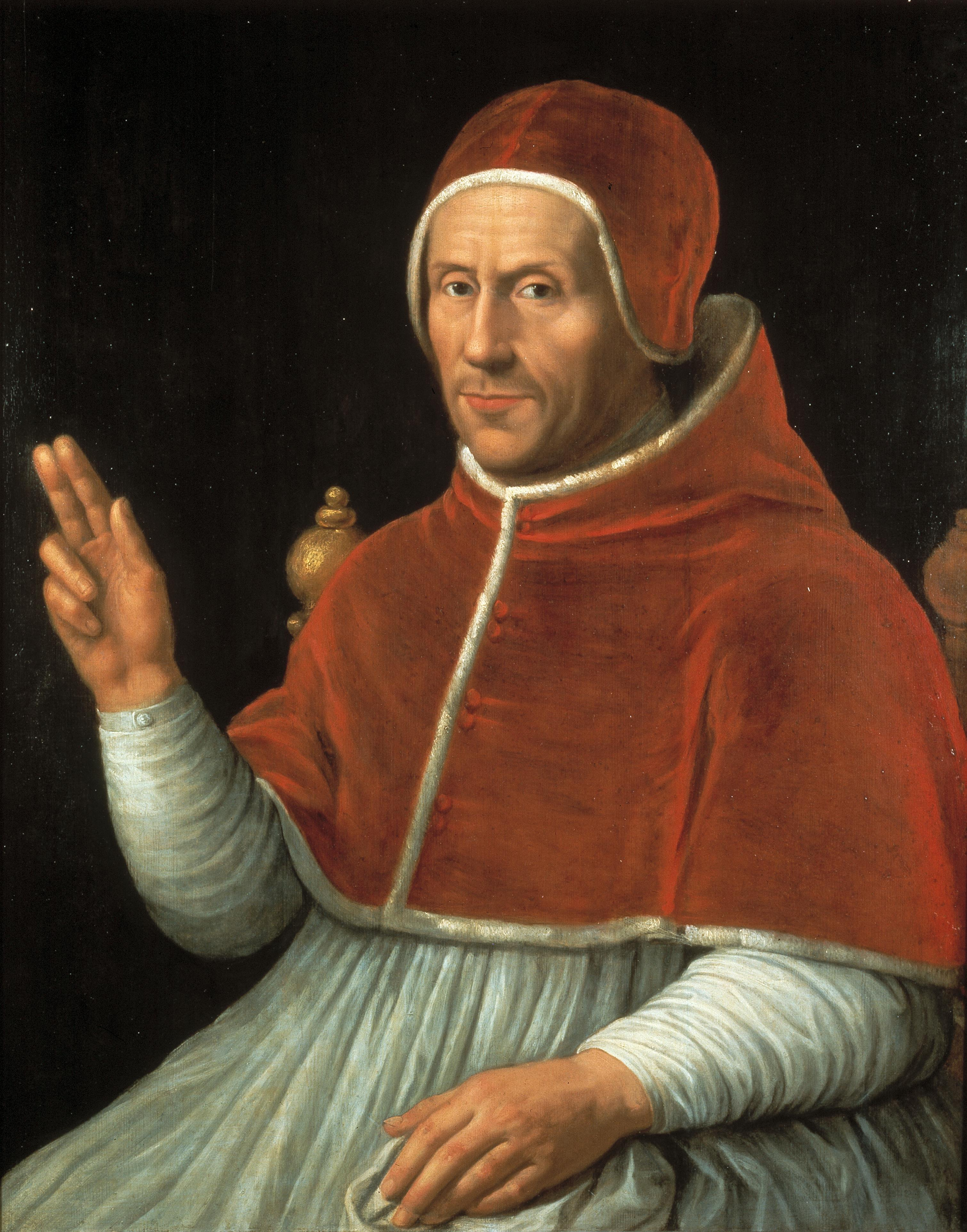
- Portrait after Jan van Scorel, c. 1625 (Centraal Museum, Utrecht)
- Church: Catholic Church
- Papacy began: 9 January 1522
- Papacy ended: 14 September 1523
- Predecessor: Leo X
- Successor: Clement VII
- Previous posts: Bishop of Tortosa (1516–1522); Cardinal-Priest of Santi Giovanni e Paolo (1517–1522)

Orders
- Ordination: 30 June 1490
- Consecration: August 1516 by Diego Ribera de Toledo
- Created cardinal: 1 July 1517 by Leo X

Personal details
- Born: Adriaan Floriszoon Boeyens; 2 March 1459 Utrecht, Bishopric of Utrecht, Holy Roman Empire
- Died: 14 September 1523 (aged 64) Rome, Papal States
- Buried: Santa Maria dell'Anima, Rome
- Motto: Patere et sustine ("Respect and wait")

- Coat of arms

Papal styles of Pope Adrian VI
- Reference style: His Holiness
- Spoken style: Your Holiness
- Religious style: Holy Father
- Posthumous style: None

Pope Adrian VI (Latin: Hadrianus VI; Italian: Adriano VI; German: Hadrian VI.; Dutch: Adrianus/Adriaan VI), born Adriaan Florensz Boeyens (2 March 1459 – 14 September 1523), was head of the Catholic Church and leader of the Papal States from 9 January 1522 until his death on 14 September 1523. The only Dutchman to become pope, he was the last non-Italian pope until the Polish John Paul II 455 years later.

Born in the Episcopal principality of Utrecht of the Holy Roman Empire of the German Nation, Adrian studied at the University of Leuven in the Low Countries, where he rose to the position of professor of theology, also serving as its rector (the equivalent of president or vice-chancellor). In 1507, he became the tutor of the future Charles V, Holy Roman Emperor, who later trusted him as both his emissary and his regent. In 1516, Charles, now King of Castile and Aragon, appointed Adrian bishop of Tortosa, Spain, and soon thereafter Grand Inquisitor of the kingdoms of Aragon and Castile. Pope Leo X made him a cardinal in 1517 and after Leo's death he was elected pope in 1522 as a compromise candidate.

Adrian came to the papacy in the midst of one of its greatest crises, threatened not only by Lutheranism to the north but also by the advance of the Ottoman Turks to the east. He refused to compromise with Lutheranism theologically, demanding Luther's condemnation as a heretic. However, he is noted for having attempted to reform the Catholic Church administration in response to the Protestant Reformation. Adrian's admission that the Roman Curia itself was at fault for the turmoil in the Church was read at the 1522–1523 Diet of Nuremberg.

His efforts at reform proved fruitless, as they were resisted by most of his contemporaries, and he did not live long enough to see his efforts through to their conclusion. He was succeeded by the second Medici pope, Clement VII. Adrian VI and Marcellus II are the only popes of the modern era to retain their baptismal names after their election. Adrian VI is also the last pope to date to use the pontifical name "Adrian".

== Early life ==
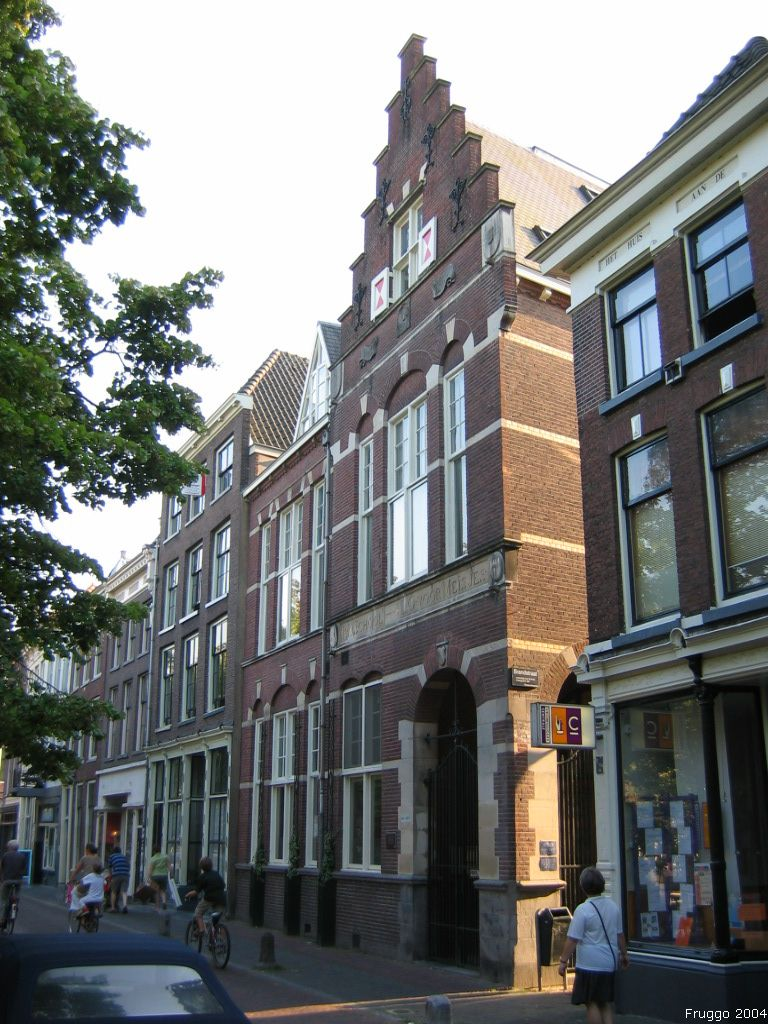
Pope Adrian VI's birthplace in Utrecht

Adriaan Florensz was born on 2 March 1459 in the city of Utrecht, which was then the capital of the Prince-Bishopric of Utrecht, a part of the Burgundian Netherlands in the Holy Roman Empire. He was born into modest circumstances as the son of Florens Boeyensz, also born in Utrecht, and his wife Geertruid. He had three older brothers, Jan, Cornelius, and Claes. Adrian consistently signed with Adrianus Florentii or Adrianus de Traiecto ("Adrian of Utrecht") in later life, suggesting that his family did not yet have a surname but used patronymics only.

Adrian was probably raised in a house on the corner of the Brandstraat and Oude Gracht that was owned by his grandfather Boudewijn (Boeyen, for short). His father, a carpenter and likely shipwright, died when Adrian was 10 years or younger. Adrian studied from a very young age under the Brethren of the Common Life, either at Zwolle or Deventer and was also a student of the Latin school (now Gymnasium Celeanum) in Zwolle.

== Leuven ==
In June 1476, he started his studies at the University of Leuven, where he pursued philosophy, theology and Canon Law, thanks to a scholarship granted by Margaret of York, Duchess of Burgundy. In 1478 he had the title of Primus Philosophiae, as well as that of Magister Artium (that is, he took his undergraduate degree). In 1488 he was chosen by the Faculty of Arts to be their representative on the Council of the university.

On 30 June 1490, Adrian was ordained a priest.

After the regular 12 years of study, Adrian became a Doctor of Theology in 1491. He had been a teacher at the university since 1490, was chosen vice-chancellor of the university in 1493, and Dean of St. Peter's in 1498. In the latter function he was permanent vice-chancellor of the university and de facto in charge of hiring. His lectures were published, as recreated from his students' notes; among those who attended was the young Erasmus. Adrian offered him a professorate in 1502, but Erasmus refused.

In November 1506 Margaret of Austria, Duchess of Savoy, became Governor of the Habsburg Netherlands and chose Adrian as her advisor. The next year Emperor Maximilian I appointed him also tutor to his seven-year-old grandson, and Margaret's nephew, who in 1519 became Emperor Charles V. By 1512 Adrian was Charles's advisor, and his court obligations were so time-consuming that he quit his positions at the university.

== Spain ==
In 1515, Charles sent Adrian to Spain to convince his maternal grandfather, Ferdinand II of Aragon, that the Spanish lands should come under his rule, and not Charles's Spanish-born younger brother Ferdinand, whom his grandfather had in mind. Adrian succeeded in that just before Ferdinand's death in January 1516. Ferdinand of Aragon, and subsequently Charles V, appointed Adrian Bishop of Tortosa, which was approved by Pope Leo X on 18 August 1516. He was consecrated by Bishop Diego Ribera de Toledo.

On 14 November 1516 the King commissioned him Inquisitor General of Aragon.

In his fifth Consistory for the creation of cardinals, on 1 July 1517, Pope Leo X (1513–21) named thirty-one cardinals, among whom was Adrianus de Traiecto, naming him Cardinal-Priest of the Basilica of Santi Giovanni e Paolo on the Caelian Hill.

During the minority of Charles V, Adrian was named to serve with Cardinal Francisco Jimenez de Cisneros as co-regent of Spain. After the death of Jimenez, Adrian was appointed (14 March 1518) General of the Reunited Inquisitions of Castile and Aragon, in which capacity he acted until his departure for Rome. When Charles V left Spain for the Netherlands in 1520, he appointed Cardinal Adrian Regent of Spain, during which time he had to deal with the Revolt of the Comuneros.

== Papal election ==
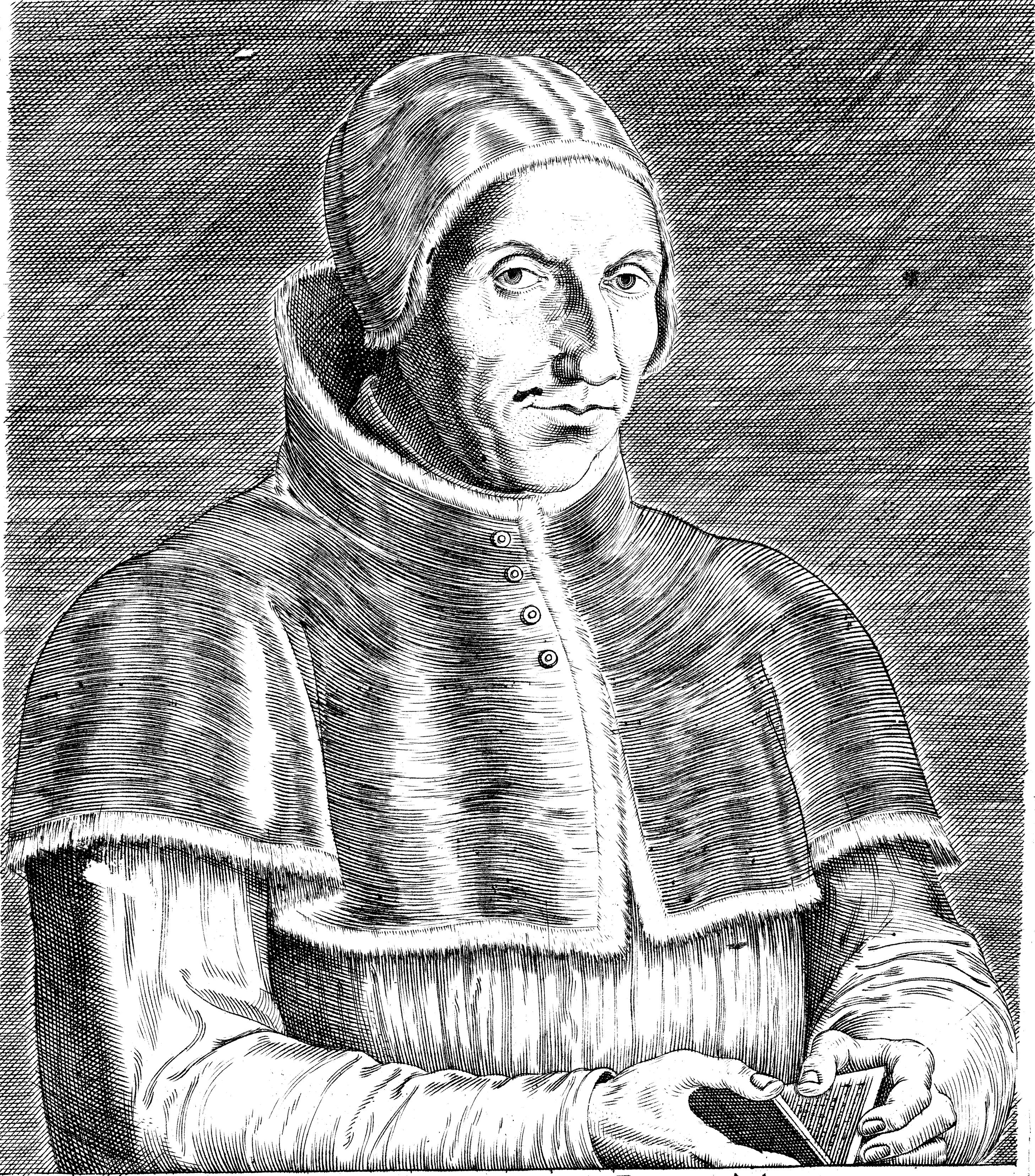
Pope Adrian VI, 1598 engraving by Théodore Galle

In the conclave after the death of the Medici Pope Leo X, Leo's cousin, Cardinal Giulio de' Medici, was the leading figure. With Spanish and French cardinals in a deadlock, the absent Adrian was proposed as a compromise and on 9 January 1522 he was elected by an almost unanimous vote. Charles V was delighted upon hearing that his tutor had been elected to the papacy but soon realised that Adrian VI was determined to reign impartially. Francis I of France, who feared that Adrian would become a tool of the Emperor, and had uttered threats of a schism, later relented and sent an embassy to present his homage.

Fears of a Spanish Avignon based on the strength of his relationship with the Emperor as his former tutor and regent proved baseless, and Adrian, having notified the College of Cardinals of his acceptance, left for Italy from L'Ampolla after six months of preparations and trying to decide which route to take, making his solemn entry into Rome on 29 August. He had forbidden elaborate decorations, and many people stayed away for fear of the plague that was raging. Pope Adrian was crowned at St. Peter's Basilica on 31 August 1522, at the age of 63.

== Papacy ==
He immediately entered upon the path of the reformer. The 1908 edition of the Catholic Encyclopedia characterised the task that faced him:

"To extirpate inveterate abuses; to reform a court which thrived on corruption, and detested the very name of reform; to hold in leash young and warlike princes, ready to bound at each other's throats; to stem the rising torrent of revolt in Germany; to save Christendom from the Turks, who from Belgrade now threatened Hungary, and if Rhodes fell would be masters of the Mediterranean - these were herculean labours for one who was in his sixty-third year, had never seen Italy, and was sure to be despised by the Romans as a 'barbarian'.

His plan was to attack notorious abuses one by one; however, in his attempt to improve the system of indulgences he was hampered by his cardinals. He found reduction of the number of matrimonial dispensations to be impossible, as the income had been farmed out for years in advance by Pope Leo X.

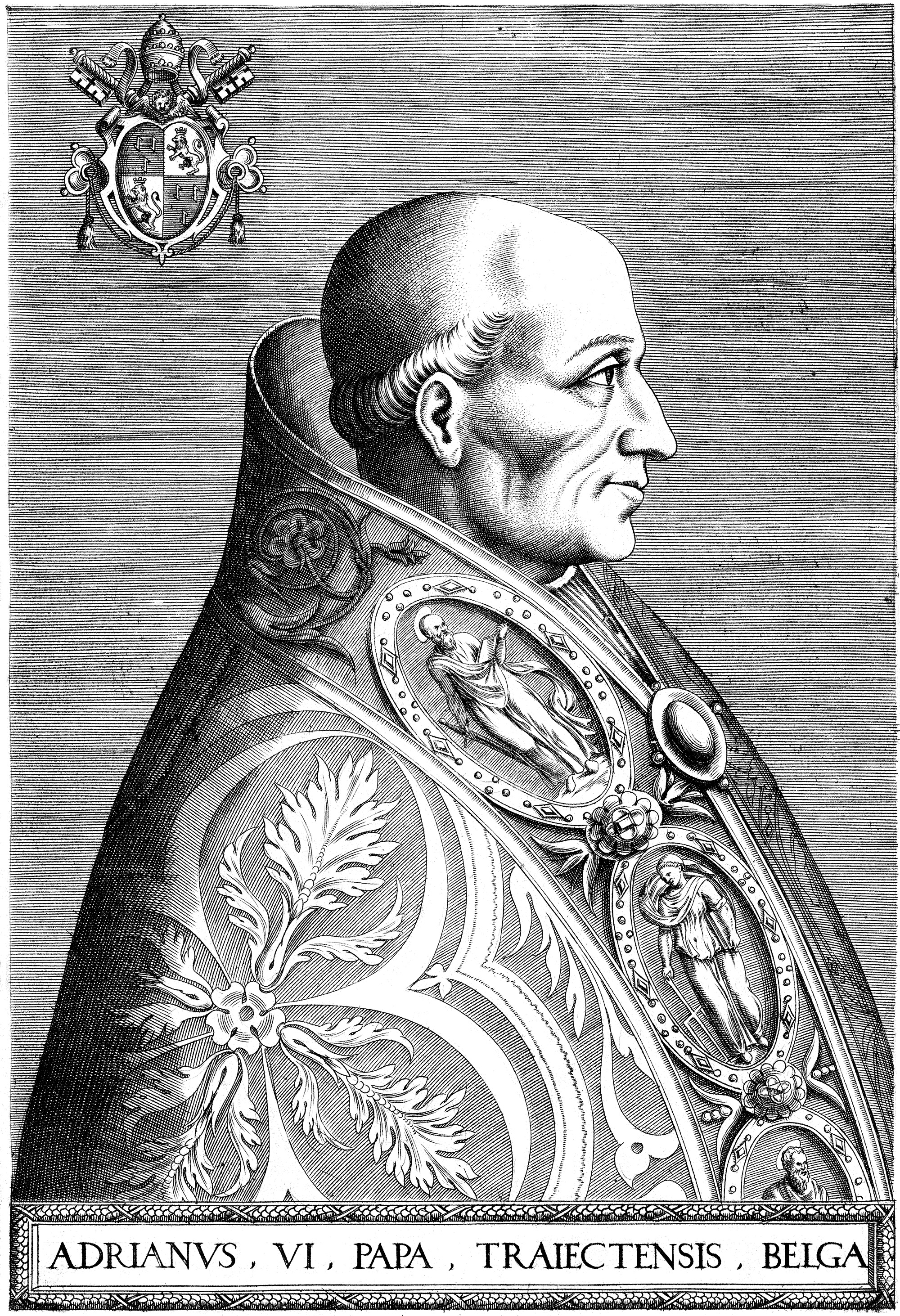
Portrait of Pope Adrian VI (1568)

Adrian VI was not successful as a peacemaker among Christian princes, whom he hoped to unite in a war against the Turks. In August 1523 he was forced into an alliance with the Empire, England, and Venice against France; meanwhile, in 1522 Suleiman the Magnificent (1520–66) had conquered Rhodes.

In his reaction to the early stages of the Lutheran revolt, Adrian VI did not completely understand the gravity of the situation. At the Diet of Nuremberg, which opened in December 1522, he was represented by Francesco Chieregati, whose private instructions contain the frank admission that the disorder of the Church was perhaps the fault of the Roman Curia itself, and that it should be reformed. However, the former professor and Inquisitor General was strongly opposed to any change in doctrine, and demanded that Martin Luther be punished for teaching heresy.

Adrian VI held no beatifications in his pontificate but canonized Saints Antoninus of Florence and Benno of Meissen on 31 May 1523.

He made only one cardinal in the course of his pontificate, Willem van Enckevoirt, who was made a cardinal-priest in a consistory held on 10 September 1523.

Charles V's ambassador in Rome, Juan Manuel, lord of Belmonte, wrote that he was worried that Charles's influence over Adrian waned after Adrian's election, writing "The Pope is 'deadly afraid' of the College of Cardinals. He does whatever two or three cardinals write to him in the name of the college."

== Death ==
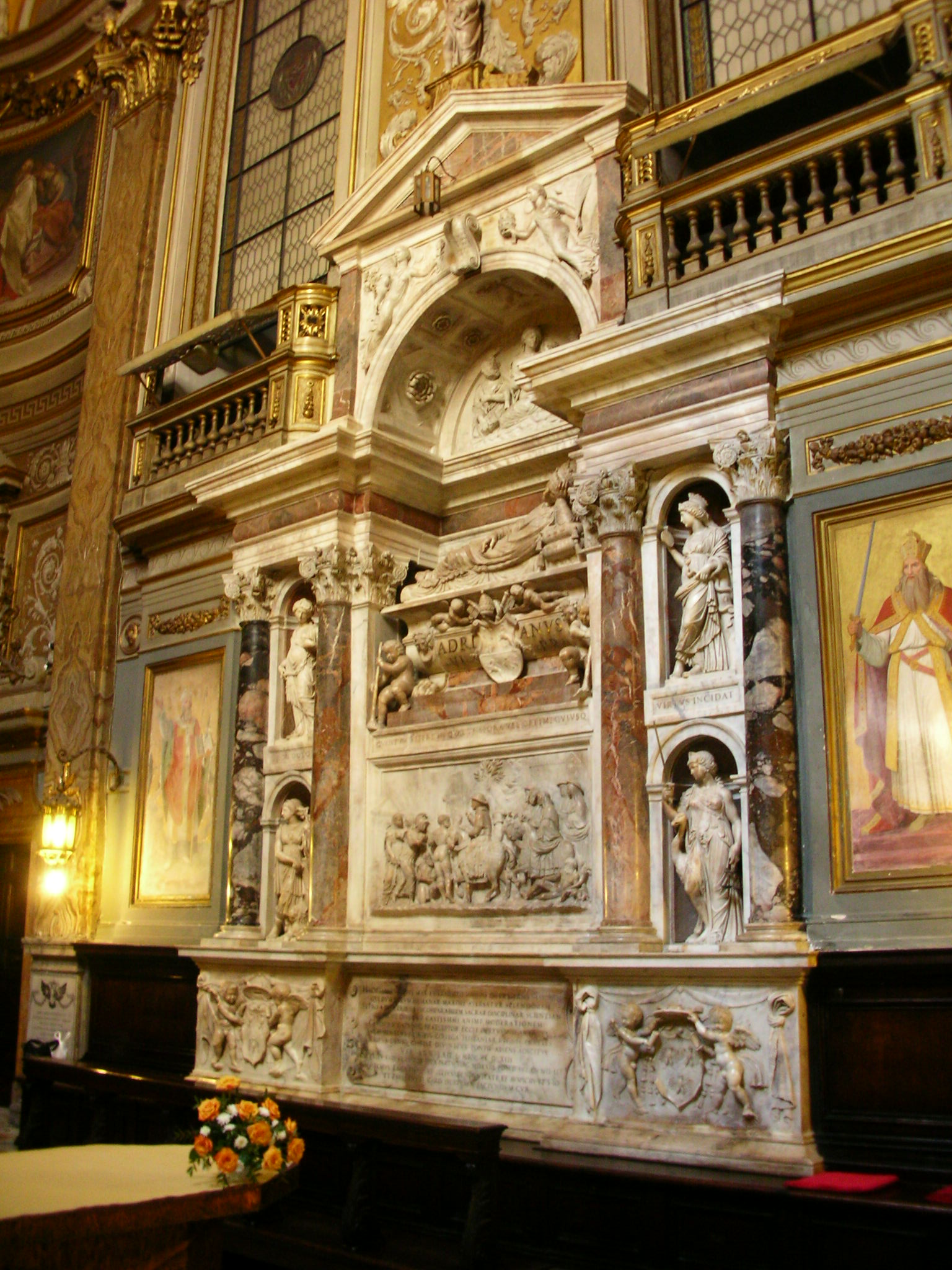
The funeral monument for Adrian VI in Santa Maria dell'Anima in Rome

Adrian VI died in Rome on 14 September 1523, after one year, eight months and six days as pope. Most of his official papers were lost after his death. He published Quaestiones in quartum sententiarum praesertim circa sacramenta (Paris, 1512, 1516, 1518, 1537; Rome, 1522), and Quaestiones quodlibeticae XII. (1st ed., Leuven, 1515). He is buried in the Santa Maria dell'Anima church in Rome.

He bequeathed property in the Low Countries for the foundation of a college at the University of Leuven that became known as Pope's College.

== In popular culture ==
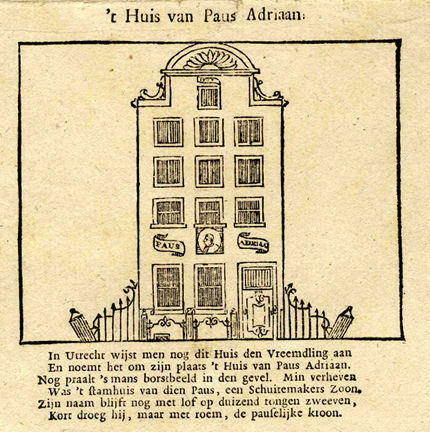
The birth house of Pope Adrian and accompanying poem. Detail of an engraving of 'Famous Dutch Men and Women'.

The first series of engravings used to educate Dutch school children at the turn of the 18th century includes Adrian VI in its woodcut on 'Famous Dutch Men and Women' with the following poem:

In Utrecht wijst men nog dit huis den vreemdeling aan,
En noemt het om zijn naam 't huis van Paus Adriaan,
Nog praalt 's mans borstbeeld in den gevel. Min verheven
Was 't het stamhuis van dien Paus, een schuitemakers zoon,
Zijn naam blijft nog vol lof op duizend tongen zweeven,
Kort droeg hij, maar met roem, de pauselijke kroon.'

In Utrecht they still point out this house to strangers,
And name it after him: the house of pope Adrian,
Still his bust stands in its façade. Less elevated
Was the ancestry of this pope, the son of a boat builder,
His name is still proudly spoken by thousands of tongues,
Only briefly, but with honor, he wore the papal crown.

Pope Adrian VI appears as a character in Christopher Marlowe's stage drama The Tragical History of Doctor Faustus (1604).

== Bibliography ==
- Baumgartner, Frederic J. (2003). Behind Locked Doors: A History of the Papal Elections. Palgrave Macmillan. ISBN 0-312-29463-8.
- Bietenholz, Peter G.; Deutscher, Thomas Brian (6 September 2003). Contemporaries of Erasmus: A Biographical Register of the Renaissance and Reformation. Toronto: University of Toronto Press. pp. 5–9. ISBN 978-0-8020-8577-1.
- Creighton, Mandell. A History of The Papacy during the Period of the Reformation Volume V (London 1894).
- Creighton, Mandell (1897). A History of the Papacy from the Great Schism to the Sack of Rome. Vol. VI. London: Longmans, Green, and Company. ISBN 9780837077819.
- Domarus, M. v. "Die Quellen zur Geschichte des Papstes Hadrian VI.," Historisches Jahrbuch 16 (München 1895), 70–91.
- Giovio, Paolo (1551). Vita Leonis Decimi, pontifici maximi: libri IV...Hadriani VI... et Pompeii Columnae... (in Latin). Florence: Lorenzo Torrentini.
- Gregorovius, Ferdinand. The History of Rome in the Middle Ages (translated from the fourth German edition by A. Hamilton) Volume 8 part 2 [Book XIV, Chapter 4-5] (London 1902)
- Gross, Ernie. This Day In Religion. New York:Neal-Schuman Publishers, Inc, 1990. ISBN 1-55570-045-4.
- Gulik, Guilelmus van; Konrad Eubel (1923). L. Schmitz-Kallenberg (ed.). Hierarchia catholica medii aevi (in Latin). Vol. III (editio altera ed.). Münster: sumptibus et typis librariae Regensbergianae.
- Karl Adolf Constantin, Ritter von Höfler (1880). Papst Adrian VI. 1522–1523 (in German). Vienna: Wilhelm Braumüller.
- Luther, Martin. Luther's Correspondence and Other Contemporary Letters, 2 vols., tr.and ed. by Preserved Smith, Charles Michael Jacobs, The Lutheran Publication Society, Philadelphia, Pa. 1913, 1918. vol.I (1507–1521) and vol.2 (1521–1530) from Google Books. Reprint of Vol.1, Wipf & Stock Publishers (March 2006). ISBN 1-59752-601-0
- Malerba, Luigi. Le maschere, Milan: A. Mondadori, 1995. ISBN 88-04-39366-1
- McNally, Robert E. (1969). "Pope Adrian VI (1522-23) and Church Reform". Archivum Historiae Pontificiae. 7: 253–285. JSTOR 23563708.
- Pasolini, Guido. Adriano VI. Saggio Storico (Rome, 1913).
- Pastor, Ludwig. History of the Popes (tr. R.F. Kerr) Volume VIII (St. Louis 1908).
- Paulus Jovius, "Vita Hadriani VI," in Gaspar Burmann, Analecta historica de Hadriano Sexto (Utrecht 1727) 85–150.
- Rodocanachi, E. (1931). "La jeunesse d' Adrien VI". Revue Historique. 56 (2): 300–307. JSTOR 40944759.
- Verweij, Michiel. Adrianus VI (1459–1523): de tragische paus uit de Nederlanden, Antwerpen & Apeldoorn: Garant Publishers, 2011. ISBN 90-44-12664-4

Catholic Church titles
Preceded by Luis Mercader Escolano	Grand Inquisitor of Spain; 1516–1522	Succeeded by Alonso Manrique de Lara
Preceded by Luis Mercader Escolano	Bishop of Tortosa; 1516–1522	Succeeded by Willem van Enckenvoirt
Preceded by Francisco de Remolins	Cardinal-Priest of Ss. Giovanni e Paolo; 1517–1522	Succeeded by Willem van Enckenvoirt
Preceded by Leo X	Pope; 1522–1523	Succeeded by Clement VII
