= Diego Ramírez de Guzmán =

Diego Ramirez de Guzman ( –1508) became the bishop of Catania, Italy on 26 June 1500, after having been promoted previously to bishop of Lugo, Spain, on 7 February 1500. He replaced there Spanish bishop Francisco Desprats, (Appointed 14 Feb 1498 – 9 February 1500 Appointed, Bishop of Astorga, Spain, on 9 February 1500). He died there, Catania, 23 October 1508.

He was replaced by Spanish Aragonese friar, Jaime de Conchillos, appointed bishop of Catania on 25 February 1509, but who was appointed Bishop of Lérida, or bishop of Lleida, in the actual Catalan language, on 1 October 1512, under the ruling of his master, king Ferdinand II of Aragon, king of Naples and king of Sicily, also, between other titles.

== External links and additional sources ==
- Cheney, David M. "Diocese of Lugo". Catholic-Hierarchy.org. (for Chronology of Bishops) ^{[self-published]}
- Chow, Gabriel. "Diocese of Lugo (Spain)". GCatholic.org. (for Chronology of Bishops) ^{[self-published]}
- Cheney, David M. "Archdiocese of Catania". Catholic-Hierarchy.org. (for Chronology of Bishops) ^{[self-published]}
- Chow, Gabriel. "Metropolitan Archdiocese of Catania (Italy)". GCatholic.org. (for Chronology of Bishops) ^{[self-published]}

Catholic Church titles
Preceded by Alonso Suárez de la Fuente del Sauce	Bishop of Lugo; 1500	Succeeded by Pedro Ribera
Preceded by Francisco Desprats	Bishop of Catania; 1498–1500	Succeeded by Jaime de Conchillos
Preceded by Diego Deza	Grand Inquisitor of Spain; 1506–1507	Succeeded by Francisco Jiménez de Cisneros
