= Palace of Villahermosa =

Historical palace in Madrid, Spain

- Palacio de Villahermosa (Spanish)
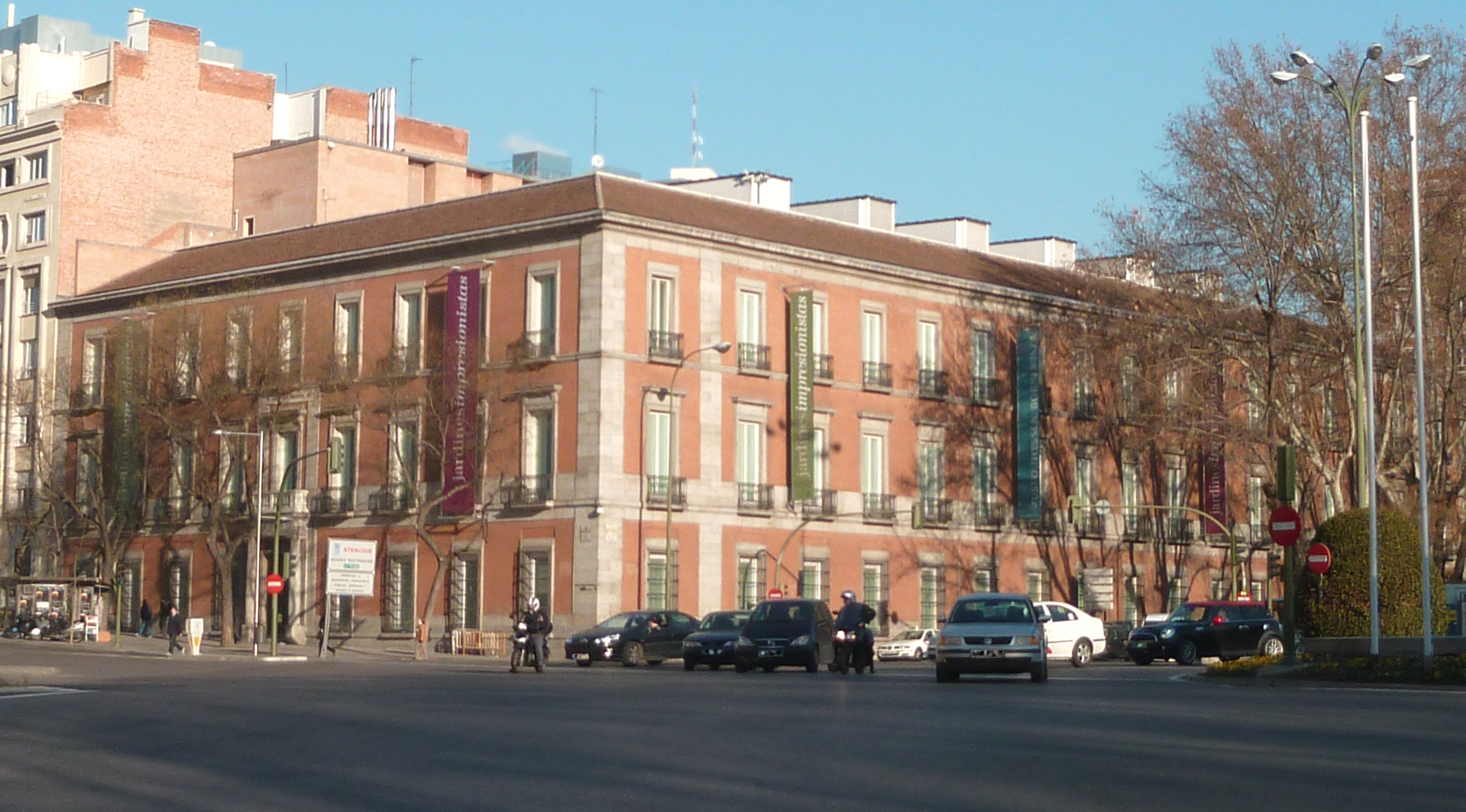

- Location within Spain
- 40.415695°N 3.695162°W
- Location: Madrid, Spain

Spanish Cultural Heritage
- Official name: Palacio de Villahermosa
- Type: Non-movable
- Criteria: Monument
- Designated: 1993
- Reference no.: RI-51-0008318

The Palace of Villahermosa (Spanish: Palacio de Villahermosa) is a ducal palace located in Madrid, Spain. It was built in the 18th century and remodelled in 1805 in the neoclassical style.

The former townhouse of the Dukes of Villahermosa, it was designated to be of Bien de Interés Cultural in 1993. In 1990 Rafael Moneo reformed this old neoclassic building. Presently it is the headquarters of the Thyssen-Bornemisza Museum.

== See also ==
- Art museum
- Duke of Villahermosa
