= San Esteban, Burgos =

Church in Burgos, Spain

Coordinates: 42°20′31″N 3°42′19″W

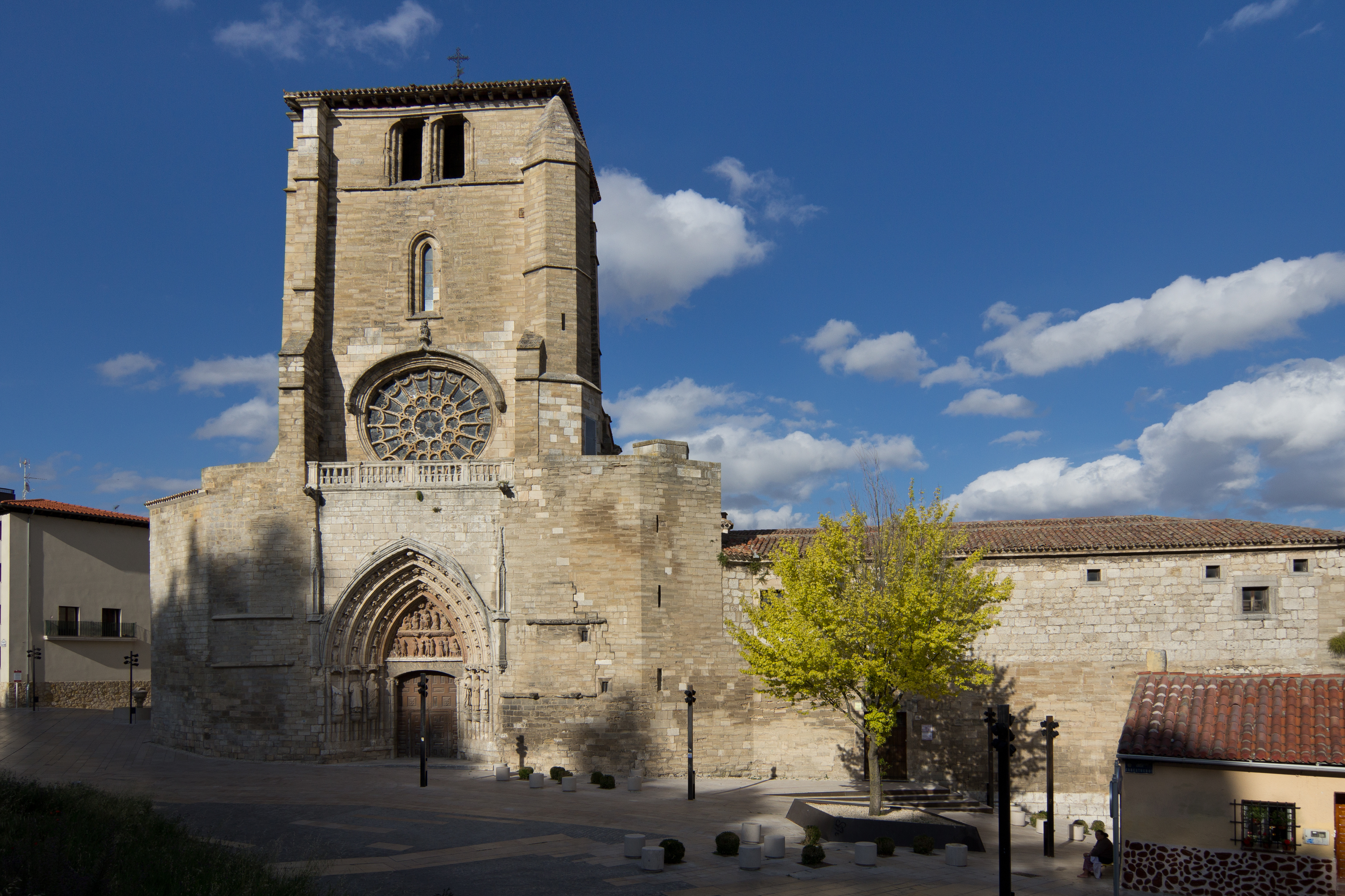
Iglesia de San Esteban

Iglesia de San Esteban is a former Catholic church in Burgos, Spain, on the eastern perimeters of Burgos Castle. It was essentially built between the late thirteenth and early fourteenth century. It now houses the Museo del Retablo.
