= Bishop of Tortosa =

Catholic bishopric in Spain

The bishop of Tortosa is the ordinary of the Roman Catholic Diocese of Tortosa in Catalonia, Spain. The bishop is a suffragan of the archbishop of Tarragona.

== List of bishops of Tortosa ==
- Rufus 64–90?
- Macianus (2nd century)
- Quartus c. 156
- Eustorgius (3rd century)
- Exuperantius ?–369
- Herodotus (4th century)
- Lirios 364–399
- Heros ca. 400
- Ervicius (6th century)
- Ursus 516–525
- Assellus 525–546
- Maurilius 546–580
- Julian 580–589
- Froisclo 589–599
- Rufinus 614–633
- John 633–638
- Afrilla 653–683
- Caecilius 683–688/90
- Inviolatus 693–715
  - Muslim invasion
- Paterno 1058
- Berenguer (11th century)
- Gaufroy d'Avignon 1151–1165
- Ponç de Monells 1165–1193
- Gombau de Santa Oliva 1194–1212
- Ponç de Torrella 1212–1254
- Bernat d'Olivella (Bernardo Olivella) 1254–1272
- Arnau de Jardí 1272–1306
- Dalmau de Montoliu 1306
- Pere de Batet (Pedro de Beteto) 1307–1310
- Francesc de Paulhac 1310–1316
- Berenguer de Prat (Berenguer Prat) 1316–1341
- Guillem de Sentmenat 1341
- Arnau de Lordat 1341–1346
- Bernat Oliver 1346–1348
- Jaume Sitjó i Carbonell 1348–1351
- Esteve Malet 1351–1356
- Joan Fabra (Juan Fabra) 1357–1362
- Jaume of Prades and Foix (Jaime de Aragón) 1362–1369
- Guillem de Torrelles 1369–1379
- Hug de Llupià–Bages (Hugo de Lupia y Bagés) 1379–1398, Appointed, Bishop of Valencia)
- Pero de Luna y de Albornoz (administrator) 1399–1403
- Lluís de Prades i d'Arenós 1404
- Francesc Climent dit Sa Pera (Francesco Climent Sapera, Pérez Clemente) 1407–1410
- Pero de Luna (administrator) 1410–1414
- Ot de Montcada i de Luna (Otón de Montcada y de Luna) 1415–1473
- Alfons d'Aragó (Alfonso d'Aragona) 1475–1513
- Juan de Enguera, O.P. (1512–1513 Died)
- Fra Lluís Mercader (Luis Mercader Escolano), O. Cart. (1513–1516)
- Adriaan Florenszoom Dedel (Adriaan Floriszoon Boeyens) (Papa Adrian VI) 1516–1522
- William of Enckenvoirt (Willem van Enckenvoirt) 1523–1534
- Fra Antoni de Calcena (Antonio Calcena) 1537–1539
- Jeroni de Requesens (Jerónimo Requeséns) 1542–1548
- Ferran de Lloaces 1553–1560
- Martín de Córdoba Mendoza 1560–1574
- Fra Joan Izquierdo 1574–1585
- Joan Terès i Borrull 1586–1587
- Joan Bta. Cardona 1587–1589
- Gaspar Punter i Barreda 1590–1600
- Fra Pedro Manrique 1601–1611
- Fra Isidor Aliaga 1611–1612
- Alfonso Márquez de Prado 1612–1616
- Lluís de Tena 1616–1622
- Agustín Spínola Basadone 1623–1626
- Justino Antolínez de Burgos y de Saavedra 1628–1637
- Giovanni Battista Veschi 1641–1655
- Gregorio Parcero 1656–1663
- Fra Josep Fageda 1664–1685
- Fra Sever Tomàs i Auter 1685–1700
- Silvestre Garcia Escalona 1702–1714
- Juan Miguélez de Mendaña 1715–1717
- Bartolomé Camacho y Madueño 1720–1757
- Francesc Borrull 1757–1758
- Luís García Mañero 1760–1765
- Bernardo Velarde y Velarde 1765–1779
- Pedro Cortés y Larraz 1780–1786
- Victoriano López Gonzalo 1787–1790
- Antonio José Salinas Moreno 1790–1812
- Manuel Ros de Medrano 1815–1821
- Víctor Damián Sáez y Sánchez-Mayor 1824–1839
- Damián gordo y Sáez 1848–1854
- Gil Esteve i tomàs 1858
- Miquel Pratmans i Llambés 1860–1861
- Benet Vilamitjana i Vila 1862–1879
- Francisco Aznar y Pueyo 1879–1893
- Pere Rocamora i Garcia 1894–1925
- Félix bilbao y Ugarriza 1926–1943
- Manuel Moll i Salord 1943–1968
- Ricard–Maria Carles i Gordó 1969–1990
- Lluís Martínez Sistach 1991–1997
- Xavier Salinas i Vinyals 1997–2012
- Enrique Benavent Vidal 2013–2022
- Sergi Gordo Rodríguez 2023
