= Legend of the Four Blood Bars =

Spanish heraldic legend

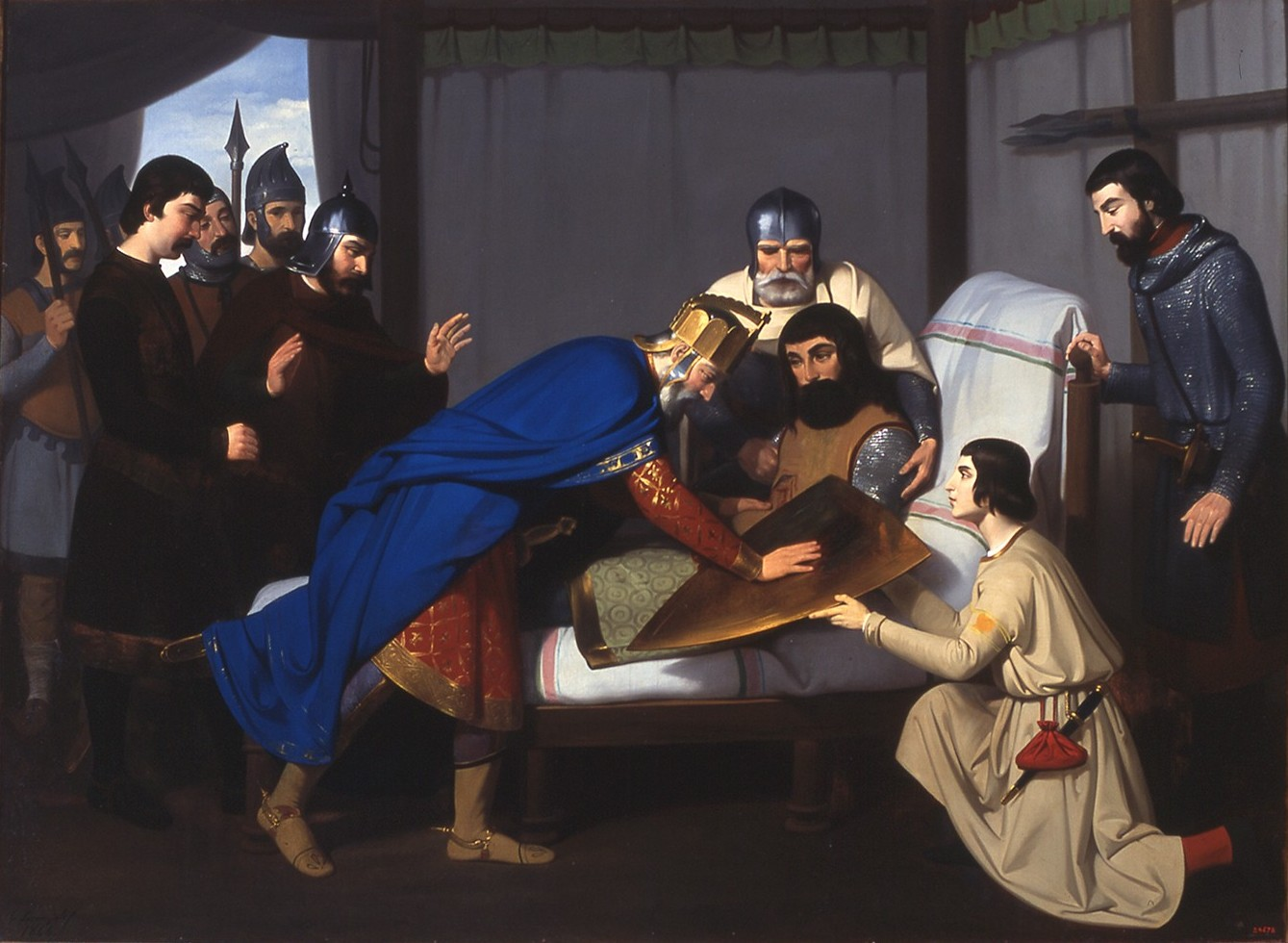
Mort de Guifré el Pelós, by Claudi Lorenzale i Sugrañes, ca. 1843

The Legend of the Four Blood Bars is an heraldic legend about the origins of the Senyera Reial (Royal Banner) that appeared for the first time in 1551 at Segunda parte de la crónica general de España, a chronicle edited by Pere Antoni Beuter in Spanish in Valencia. This legend places the Senyera Reial origins on Wilfred the Hairy. Specifically, it narrates that the sign of the four bars was created after a battle against the Normans, when the King of the Franks doused his hands in the blood of Wilfred the Hairy's injuries. After swiping his fingers over the golden shield of the Earl of Barcelona he said: "These will be your arms, Earl".

The Legend of the Four Blood Bars does not appear in any other historical work before Beuter's work in 1551, even though the affiliation of Senyal Reial to the lineage of the Barcelona's Earl was already established by the kings of Aragon in the fourteenth century. In the fifteenth century, early versions of the legend appeared. These versions explained the creation of this heraldic sign as some blood marks on a golden shield. Finally, in the sixteenth century it was Beuter who noticed that he had found the legend of Wilfred the Hairy and the blood bars in some alleged "manuscripts" he gave no further data from. Although it cannot be imputed with absolute certainty that Beuter was the creator of the legend, it seems rather clear that the alleged "manuscript" source was either remitting to an earlier source, or it was a subterfuge to avoid any subsequent critique.

The Valencian Legend of the Four Blood Bars was an immediate and fulminating success that was copied by all the later historians that made it a true story. It was not until 1812 that the Catalan historian Joan de Sans i de Barutell discredited any truth in the Valencian legend of the four bars. He noted the historical incoherences regarding Wilfred the Hairy (840–897). Meanwhile, heraldic Faustino Menéndez Pidal de Navascués proved that heraldry did not reach Europe until the second quarter of the twelfth century (1125–1150). Although it has been discredited the historicity of the legend, it is still a beautiful one, which is why artists felt the need to graphically reproduce it and gloss it with poems. The Valencian Legend of the Four Blood Bars that appeared in the sixteenth century should not be confused with the Llegenda de Guifré el Pilós (Medieval legend of Wilfred the Hairy), compiled by the monks of Santa Maria de Ripoll monastery in the twelfth century.

== Background ==
The link between the Senyera Reial and the Earl Wilfred the Hairy dates back to the fourteenth century, when the King Peter the Ceremonious indicated that the Senyera Reial was originally from the Earls of Barcelona. That is how, in 1385 he ordered to put barred shields at the county graves of Girona's Cathedral, corresponding to Ramon Berenguer II i Ermessenda de Carcassona. Indeed, when the King wrote the Ordinacions de la Casa (Court Rules) he established that the Creu d'Aïnsa (Aïnsa Cross) was the shield of the old Aragon kings and not the Senyal Reial, which he considered from the lineage of the Earls of Barcelona. In this sense, in his Cròniques dels reis d'Aragó e comtes de Barcelona a miniature comes up representing Wilfred of Arrià, mythical father of Wilfred the Hairy, who wears a barred shield. In this way, when the son of Peter IV of Aragon, Prince and future King John I of Aragon "the Haunter", asked in 1376 to Father James Dominic to write his genealogy and also his wife's in Genealogia regum Navarrae et Aragoniae et comitum Barchinonae (Genealogy of Barcelona's Earls). Once again, a miniature of Wilfred of Arrià was finally included, wearing a shield with the Senyal Reial. Kings were so sure that the Senyal Reial belonged to the lineage of the Earls of Barcelona that they publicly expressed it. As Martin I of Aragon "the Humane" and Alfonso V "the Magnanimous" did.

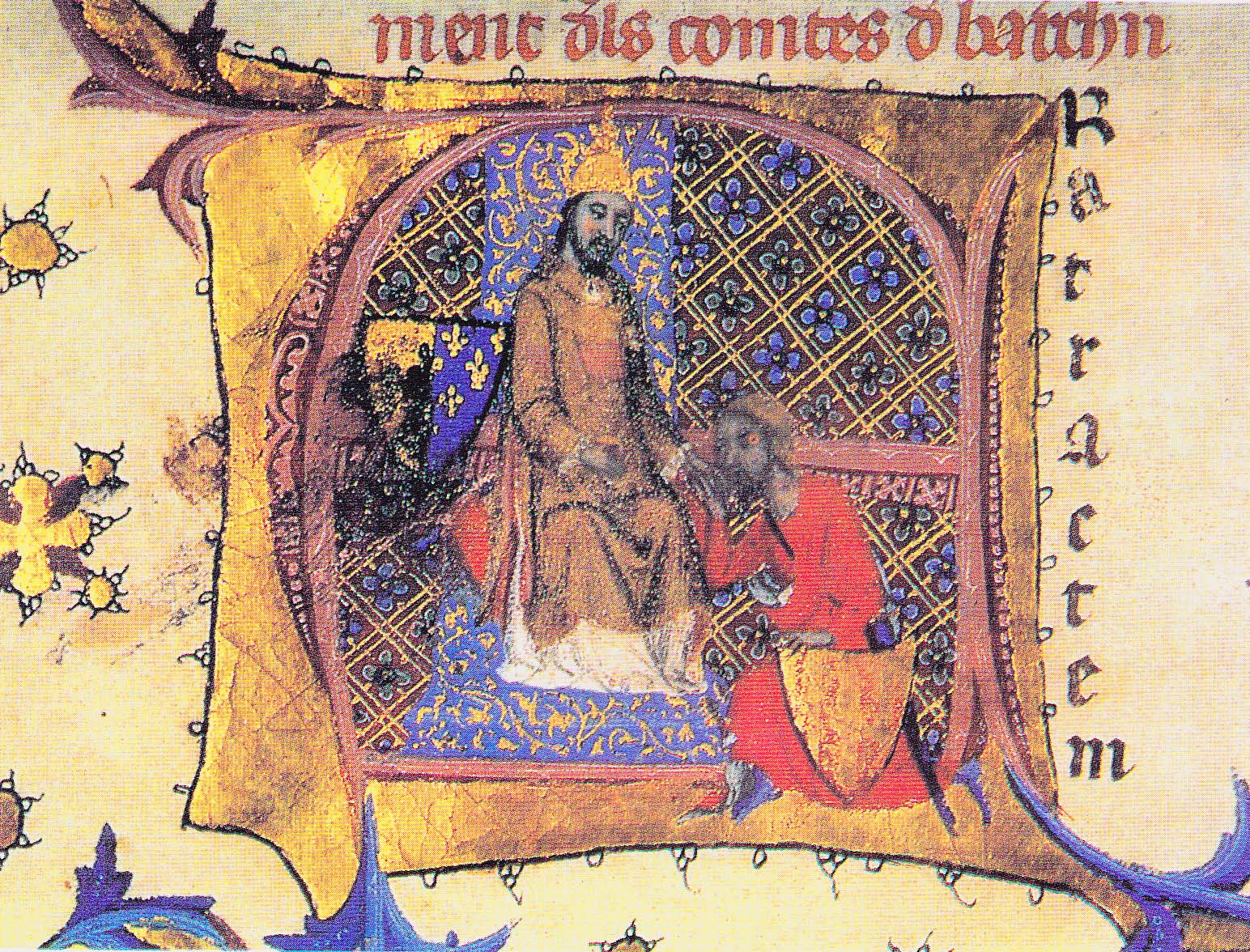

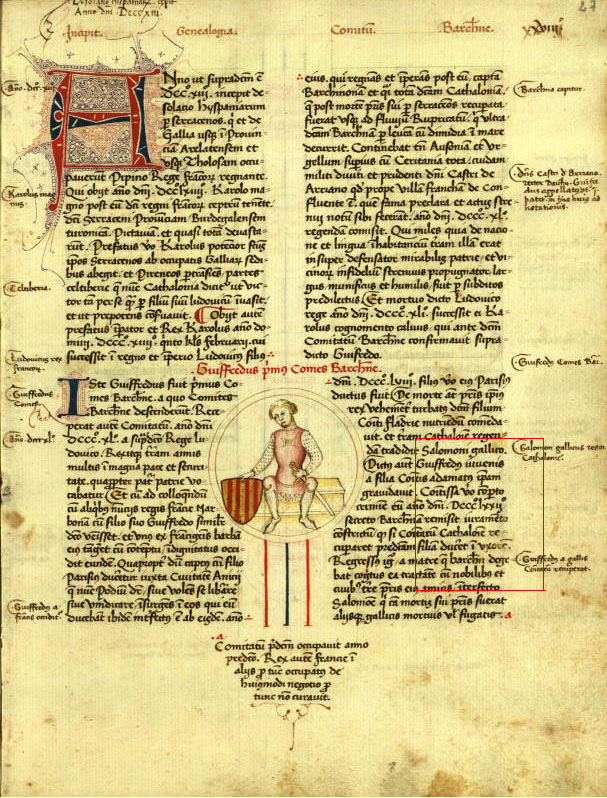

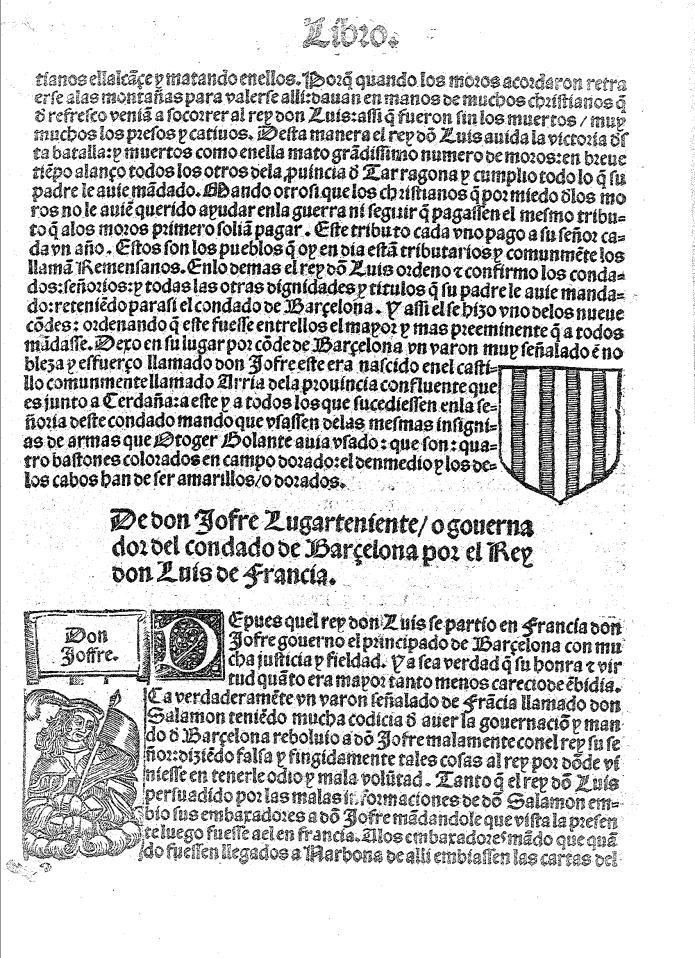

== Primary versions of the legend ==
Weapons from family Aguilar-Priego (after Fernández de Córdoba)

The Legend of the Four Blood Bars does not appear in its definitive version in any historical work before Beuter's work in 1551. It was Beuter who warned about having found the legend "according to what I found written" in a supposed "personal manuscript". Even though one cannot impute the invention of the legend to Beuter with absolute security, it seems clear that the resource of the supposed "personal manuscript" either refers to a previous source or was subterfuged to avoid any subsequent criticism. Historian Agustí Aloberro i Pericay points out that, in any case, whether he was the inventor of Beuter's legend or if the legend is an adaptation of an earlier version that circulated in Valencia, the "personal manuscript" would not be much prior to 1551.

=== Otger Cataló's version and the blood bars of 1532 ===
Aragonese historian Gualberto Fabricio de Vagad, in his play Crónica de Aragón (Chronicle of Aragon) (1499) explained again that the first king in Aragon who took the Royal Banner was Alfonso the Chaste, son of the Earl of Barcelona Ramos Berenguer IV, making it clear that they were "the canes of Catalonia". Historian Lucio Marineo Siculo expressed it in a similar way in his play De Aragoniae Regibus (1509), introducing the novelty that the emblem had its origin in the mythical Knight Otger Cataló. Lucio Marineo Siculo's play was translated into Spanish by Juan de Molina and printed in Valencia with the name of Crónica de Aragón. Starting from this translation, Spanish historian Gonzalo Fernández de Oviedo y Valdés invented a primitive version of the legend of the four bars in his play Catálogo Real de Castilla (Castilla's royal Catalogue). The Spanish historian explains that the Knight Otger Cataló arms were a golden shield and, while he was fighting against the Saracens, when he wanted to reach his shield, five blood-stained fingers stack on it. When the battle ended, Otger Cataló commanded that from that moment on that would be the shield of his successors.

Although it is not mentioned neither in the Chronicle of Aragon nor in the Chronicle of Catalonia, in view of the fact that it is relevant to talk about these arms, I will say here what I have seen written and painted in books about old coats of arms. Regarding the oldest one, which has five bars, it is written that fighting against the Moors the said Otger Cataló wore a golden shield and he was wounded in a hand. And even if he had it all bloody, he wanted to reach the named shield or put it near him. Then he stained it all with all his bloody five fingers from top to bottom and there were five lines or canes of blood on the golden shield. When he won the battle with great prosperity he ordered to maintain the shield as it was. From then on, that would be his coat of arms and the arms of his successors. Gonzalo Fernández de Oviedo y Valdés: Catálogo Real de Castilla (1532).

The Catalan historian and archiver Pere Miquel Carbonell denied any historical background of the legendary Knight Otger Cataló in his work Chròniques de Espanya fins ací no divulgades (Unrevealed Chronicles of Spain) (1513), which was printed in 1547. Finally, in 1551 the first version of the legend written in 1532 focusing in Otger Cataló was adapted by the Valencian historian Pere Antoni Beuter, who published it in his work Segunda parte de la crónica general de España(Second Party of the Spanish General Chronicle), a chronicle that was published in Spanish in Valencia, in the year 1551. The Valencian historian changed the legendary Knight Otger Cataló for the historical Earl Wilfred the Hairy, the Saracen people for the Normans, and the accidental mark of the bloody fingers above the golden shield for an epic formal concession from the Emperor of the Franks to the Earl of Barcelona; in this way, the definitive version of Legend of the Four Blood Bars was established.

== Legend of the Four Blood Bars ==
Badge with the Senyal Reial

When in the Segunda parte de la crónica general de España it is time to explain the facts of Wilfred the Hairy, the Earl of Barcelona, Beuter the episode of the Legend of the Four Blood Bars is added. Beuter explains that the Normans attacked France and Earl Wilfred the Hairy went to help the Frank Emperor. Once the Normans were defeated, the Earl Wilfred the Hairy asked Emperor Louis —it is not certain which Louis it was, if it was Louis I (814–840), Louis II (877–879), or Louis III (879–882)— to give him a coat of arms. Following his petition, the king got close to him and wet his right-hand fingers in an injury that the Earl had, sweeping them top to bottom above the Earl's golden shield and he said: "This will be your coat of arms, Earl".

In this particular event, the Normans entered France, and Emperor Louis needed people to fight them back. The Earl went to serve him with the knights from Barcelona who were with him. And they fought bravely against the Normans and they defeated them. In this battle, according to what I have found written in some scripts, it is said that Earl Jofre Valerós asked Emperor Louis to give him a coat of arms he could carry on his golden shield, that until that moment carried no insignia. And the Emperor, realizing that he had been so brave in that battle where, in spite of the injuries, he had done wonderful things, got close to him, and wet his right-hand on the blood that sprouted from the Earl, and he swiped the four bloody fingers above the golden shield from top to bottom, making four lines of blood, and he said: "This will be your coat of arms, Earl. And there he made the four lines, or stripes, of blood in a golden field, the coat of arms of Catalonia which are currently used today by Aragon.

— Pere Antoni Beuter: Segunda parte de la crónica general de España (1550)
