= Pàtria (2017 film) =

- Theatrical release poster
- Directed by: Joan Frank Charansonnet
- Written by: Pau Gener; Joan Frank Charansonnet; Isart Pellín
- Based on: The legend of Otger Cataló
- Produced by: Dani Bernabe; Efren Casas; Joan Frank Charansonnet; Alba Lopez; Susanna Plana; Joan Vila
- Starring: Miquel Sitjar
- Cinematography: Joan Babiloni
- Edited by: Fernando Casas
- Music by: Ricard Boya; Pedro Burruezo
- Production companies: Dejavú Films; Capaneida Films
- Release date: 9 June 2017
- Running time: 112 minutes
- Country: Spain
- Language: Catalan
- Budget: €250,000-€400,000
- Box office: $56,263

Pàtria (English "Fatherland") is a 2017 Catalan-language Spanish historical drama film directed by Joan Frank Charansonnet, starring Miquel Sitjar. It is based on the legend of the Catalan national hero Otger Cataló as recounted by Pere Tomich. The plot, set in 8th-century Catalonia, follows the story of Otger as he resists the moorish invaders who have occupied Catalonia.

The film was filmed on a very low budget but was awarded Best International Feature Film at the Nice International Film Festival. The film has a strong Catalan nationalist subtext and has been criticised for its negative depiction of the Moors in Spain.

== Plot ==
The film opens in the 15th century, when Climent de Vallcebre, an elderly noble, arrives at the Catalan Monastery of San Llorens. Climent intends to end his days at the monastery, in the company of his friend Abbot Ponç. While at the monastery Climent recounts the deeds of the 8th century warrior Otger Cataló to a young monk named Pere Tomich, who preserves them for posterity in a chronicle he is writing.

The film shows flashbacks to these 8th century events, relating how Otger arrives in Catalonia and begins a bloody war against the saracens. It also tells the story of the origins of the Catalan heroes who fought alongside Otger, the Nine Barons of Fame. Otger and the barons swear to fight for the land against the saracens, led by the Emir Abderraman.

The film contains sequences with a fantasy aspect, including a meeting with a water maiden. It ends tragically, with the death of Otger.

== Cast ==
- Miquel Sitjar - Otger Cataló
- Boris Ruiz - Climent de Vallcebre
- Miquel Gelabert - Abbot Ponç
- Àngels Bassas - Dolors
- Joan Massotkleiner - Serafí
- Joan Frank Charansonnet - Roger Bernat d'Arill
- Ali El Azis - Abderraman
- Óscar Aragonés - Corporal
- Dani Bernabe - Guerau d'Alemany
- David Canals - Iu
- Pol Cardona - Gisper de Ribelles
- Juna Charansonnet - Ermesenda
- Gala Charanssonet - Oliva
- Elena Codó - Sicounin
- Oriol Corriu - Pere Tomich
- Miquel Folch - Chaplain
- Neus García - Engràcia
- Pau Llatjós - Aan
- Miriam Macias - Carmina
- Laura Martín - Bruna
- Albert Padrós - Soldier Guillem
- Andrea Pajares - Alba
- Martí Peraferrer - Monk
- Susanna Plana - Rosella
- Xavier Prat - Hug de Mataplana
- Adrià Pujades - Lluc
- Jordi Reverté - Galceran de Pinòs
- Albert Riballo - Ahmed
- Sergi Sáez - Monk

== Production and release ==
The film was produced on a low budget described variously as €250,000, €300,000 and €400,000.

The director Joan Frank Charansonnet had long dreamed of making a historical epic which would become a "Catalan Braveheart". He pitched this idea to the state-funded Catalan-language television channel TV3, but they argued that a film based on Otger was "not of interest". Following this setback, he decided to raise the money for the film by seeking private donations through the crowdfunding website Verkami. The film was shot during April of 2016. During filming, Pàtria benefitted from logistical support from the local councils of various Catalan municipalities, but did not receive any public subsidies. Charansonnet has argued that although this budget restriction had an effect on the film, making it less of an "epic", it simultaneously made the film more realistic, given the small numbers of troops involved early medieval warfare.

The film had Premiers at the International Festival of Cinema in Catalan in Barcelona and at the Nice International Film Festival in May 2015, where it won the award for Best Foreign Language Feature Film. The film than debuted across Catalonia on 9 June, 2017.

== Reception ==
Despite the director's stated desire to emulate Braveheart, Eulalia Iglesias, writing in El Confidencial, saw a closer parallel with John Boorman's Excalibur, due to its magical themes and its references to Celtic legend. Iglesias is critical of the way the film introduced the characters of the Nine Barons, each one dedicated a small sequence which she describes as "a compendium of cliches of medieval-toned fiction, with its grubby taverns, witch burnings and grizzled farmers."

The film positions Otger and the Nine Barons as defenders of Catalonia, frequently making use of terms like "invaders", "occupiers" and "oppressors" to refer to the Arabs who, according to Otger, "mistreat the land". This focus reflected the contemporary political situation in Catalonia, where the Catalan-nationalist regional government was pushing for independence from Spain. The clear allusion to contemporary politics was viewed negatively by writers reviewing the film in El Nacional and El Confidencial, but was celebrated in Avui.

Both El Nacional and El Confidencial criticise the film for its depiction of the relationship between Christians and Muslims in medieval Iberia. El Confidencial argues that the film's portrayal of the "Saracen" emir is a rehash of old stereotypes of lascivious Arabs kidnapping Christian women. In El Nacional, Gustau Nerín points out that the Christians are presented as the true owners of the land, who are pacifists but nevertheless determined to "liberate every palm of earth from the hands of the outsiders" with "blood and iron". Nerín states that this attitude ignores the reality of medieval convivencia between Christians, Muslims and Jews in Catalonia.
