= Otger Cataló =

Legendary Catalonian character

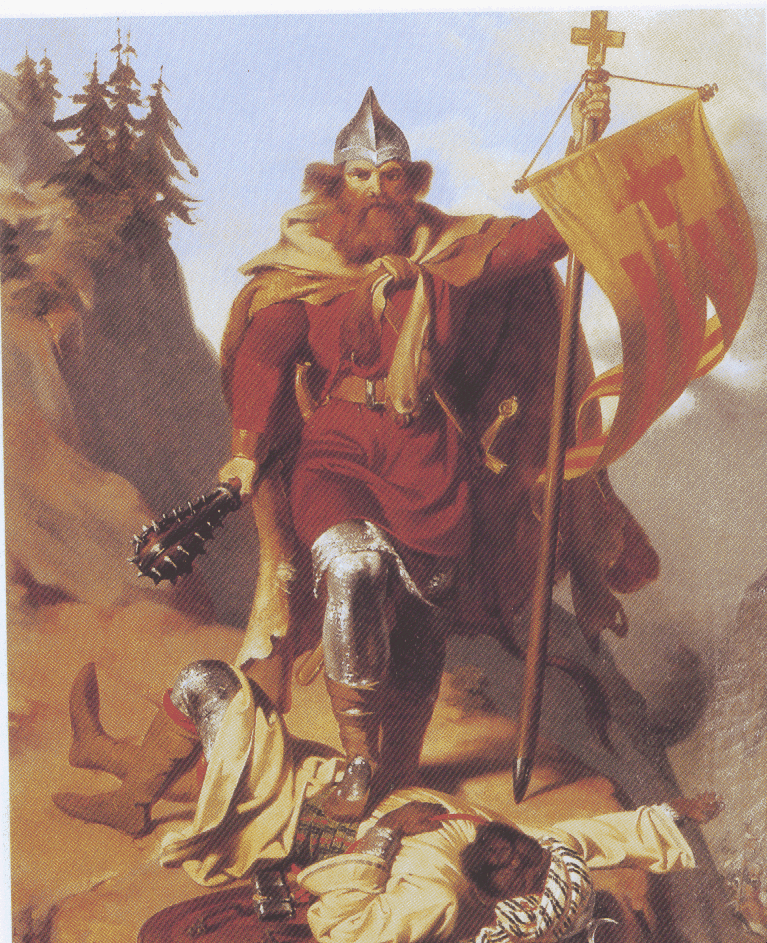
Otger Cataló in a painting by Claudi Lorenzale, carrying the club which Victor Balaguer added to his legend in 1860.

Otger Cataló (or Otger Catalon, Otger Cathaló, Otger Gollant, Otgerius Gollantes Cathelon, Otger Katzalot, Otho Katzalot, Germano Cathelon; Central Catalan pronunciation: [uˈdʒe kətəˈlo]) is a fictional historical character who, according to legend, fought to free Catalonia from the Saracens, alongside the Nine Barons of Fame, sometime in the 8th century AD. The first sources mentioning him, dating to the 15th century, use his name to provide an explanation for the origin of the name "Catalonia". The legend spread from 15th century, becoming associated with a Catalanist cultural perspective during the 19th century Catalan Renessaince, due to the works of the authors Víctor Balaguer, Antoni Ferrer i Codina and Jacint Verdaguer.

There have been many versions of the legend, but all agree that Otger came from outside Catalonia, most chroniclers stating he was from southern France, but a minority describing him as German. The legends have him entering Spain to fight a non-Christian enemy, usually the Saracens but occasionally the Goths, assisted by nine barons, who were either Catalans or servants who accompanied him from his homeland. After many victorious battles, Otger died, with his death often said to have occurred while he was besieging Empuries. After his death, the legend states that the nine barons fled to the mountains and awaited the liberation of Catalonia by Christian forces under Charlemagne.

Otger's name is influenced by the name of Ogier the Dane.

== Development of the legend ==
=== Earliest surviving documents ===
The first two surviving mentions of Otger Cataló date to 1418 (manuscript 92–6–12, Library of the University of Valencia) and in 1431 (special manuscript 13, Bibliothèque nationale de France, Paris), both written in Medieval Catalan. The two documents give differing accounts of the life of Otger, but agree that the name of the region derives from the name of his castle.

==== 1418 Manuscript ====
The 1418 manuscript states that in 732, a noble called Otger, who resided in a castle called Cathaló in Gascony, received news that "Barchinona" (Barcelona) had been conquered by the Goths, who are described as "people who do not believe in God". In order to regain the city for Christianity, Otger and the people of his castle invaded the lands of the Goths and fought in many battles, before besieging Barcelona. The Goths realised victory was impossible and surrendered the city. Following the war, the many followers of Otger settled in Barcelona and the nearby regions, taking the widows and daughters of the fallen Goths as their wives. Over the years, the children of these marriages took some words from their fathers and some from their mothers, creating a new language and taking their name, "Catalans", from Otger's castle of Cathaló.

This text is unusual in that it positions Otger as fighting a religious war against the Goths, who had long been Christians by 732. Twentieth century Catalan politician and historian, Miquel Coll i Alentorn, argued that this was due to a misreading of an earlier, now lost, source, which must have stated that Otger campaigned in (rather than against) "the land of the Goths", referring to Visigothic Hispania.

==== 1431 Manuscript ====
The 1431 manuscript relates that Otger was a "great captain" of Francia, who came to Catalonia to conquer it for the Christian faith "in the time that the Moors held the Principality of Catalonia, or the most part of it." The chronicler then says that nine barons accompanied him in his conquest, and that he died giving siege to the city of Empúries. Like the 1418 chronicle, the text states that Catalonia was named after Otger. The document then relates that the Christians were driven to the mountains and rocky fortresses of Catalonia, until Charlemagne "conquered all of Spain" and divided Catalonia into 9 counties given to the 9 barons. The text gives further details of the creation of 9 bishoprics and 900 houses of gentlemen.

==== Other early versions ====
Pere Tomich, in his 1438 Histories e Conquestes del reyalme d'Arago e principat de Cathalunya gives a mixture of information found in the 1418 and 1431 manuscripts, alongside details found in neither. He states that Otger's real surname was Golant, but that he was known as Otger Cataló due to the name of his castle. According to Tomich, Otger was a German noble who governed the province of Guyenne for the King of France. A more detailed account of Otger's campaign in Catalonia is given, stating he entered the region through Val d'Aran, into the Àneu Valley, where they fought battles against the moors of the region, alongside those of Pallars and Ribagorça. He continued his conquest by taking the castles of the region, alongside those of Cerdanya and Capcir, founding churches as he went. While Otger was laying siege to Empuries, Tomich says that a coalition of Muslim kings of Catalan cities formed and marched on the besiegers. By this time, Otger had died of illness (Tomich gives the date as 735), his army, now headed by one of the nine barons, Napifer of Montcada, retreated to the mountains and strong places. The history then narrates the liberation of the region by Charlemagne and the 9 barons. This version was highly influential on subsequent accounts of Otger.

Completed in 1448, Jaume Marquilles gives a version close to the 1431 manuscript in his Commentary on the Usages of Barcelona. It differs from the original in that it gives a date of 719 for the arrival of Otger, gives further details on the nine barons, and links the story of the reconquest to the cycle of legends around Wilfred the Hairy.

==== Theorised Latin source for the early documents ====
The 1418, 1431 and Tomich's versions were likely influenced by an earlier source written in Latin. The two earliest sources have considerable differences which show the 1431 author was not aware of the 1418 text, thus suggesting that they were both expansions of a briefer original. Coll i Alentorn notes that the 1418 text's confusion about Otger's enemy implies that the author was working from an original source which merely stated he campaigned in the "land of the Goths", without stating who he was fighting against.

Coll i Alentorn's deduction that the text must have been in Latin is based on the locations given for Otger's castle in the 1418 text and Tomich's version. While the 1418 text uses the word "Gascunya" (Gascony) to describe the location of Cataló, Tomich and subsequent authors frequently use the term "Güiena" (Guyenne). Both these words are possible translations of the Latin term "Aquitania", which had by the medieval period come to refer to different areas of southeastern France, thus suggesting both Tomich and the 1418 writer had access to a document which located Cataló in "Aquitania" but each used a different translation.

If the theory of the Latin source is correct, Coll i Alentorn argues that it must have been written at some point between 1268 and 1418. This is due to the influence on the Otger story that the author identifies from the 1243 De rebus Hispaniae, by Navarrese Archbishop Rodrigo Jiménez de Rada, which became known in Catalonia after 1268.

=== Origins of the early accounts ===
There is no historical basis for the existence of the figure of Otger, and the legend serves principally to provide an explanation for the origin of the name Catalonia. However, his origin north of the Pyrenees does reflect the origin of the Catalan principalities in the Frankish Kingdom, and various historical events, as well as the mythical cycle of the Matter of France, influenced the development of the legend.

The frequent appearance of the date 732 in sources relating to Otger probably reflects historical knowledge of the Battle of Tours, which was well known among Catalan chroniclers and was linked to Otger's origin in Aquitania. The use of the date 719 by Maquilles is analysed by Coll i Alentorn as an attempt to push back the date of Catalan resistance to the Muslim invaders to match the then accepted dates for the beginnings of the reconquista in the Kingdoms of Asturias, Navarre and Aragon.

==== Origin of the name Otger Cataló ====
The name Otger originates in the name of a largely fictional knight of Charlemagne, Ogier the Dane, whose legends were widely known in late medieval Catalonia. Coll i Alentorn also suggests that the name Otger is influenced by a character found in the fictional Provençal romance Gesta Karoli Magni ad Carcassonam et Narbonam (attributed to Philomena). The romance narrates that Ogier the Dane raided into Catalonia with Augier, who it says was the Duke of Normandy. Similarly to the 1431 text, the Christian forces lay siege to Empúries, where Augier of Normandy dies in battle, with the text also narrating a retreat from the region following Augier's death. Sergi Mainer views the connection with Ogier the Dane, an outsider at the Frankish court who refused to pay fealty to the Frankish king, as a reflection of the discomfort felt by the 15th century Catalan nobility under the rule of a Castilian king.

The name Cataló derives from misreadings chronicles relating the Battle of the Catalaunian Fields, in which a coalition of Goths and Romans defeated Attila and his army of Huns. The battle occurred near Châlons-en-Champagne in northern France, but 15th century scholars believed it had occurred near Toulouse. This, alongside the similarity of the names of Catalonia and the Latin name of Châlons (Catalaunum), gave rise to the confused version of a lord from a castle called Cataló located near Toulouse in Aquitaine.

Variants of the name Golant, dating from Tomich's text, are occasionally given by authors throughout the history of the legend. According to Coll i Alentorn, this possibly originates in the name Aigoland, which was the name of a Moorish king in the Carolingian cycle of legends. German-Canadian academic Erich von Richthofen also believed there was a connection to the Carolingian cycle, seeing Golant as a corruption of French Rollants referring to the legendary Roland.

==== Political motivations for the creation of the legend ====
The principle reason for the invention of the character was to provide an explanation for the origin of the name of Catalonia. However, medievalist Sergi Mainer argues that in Tomich's version a specifically nationalist agenda is also detectable. In his view, Tomich deliberately positions Otger's Frankish origin in opposition to the Gothic origins he ascribes to the other Iberian kingdoms. Mainer suggests that this focus was inspired by the accession of the Castilian noble Ferdinand of Antequera to the County of Barcelona and Kingdom of Aragon, which led to tensions among the Catalan nobility.

Catalan historian Agustí Alcoberro also sees the 15th century politics of Catalonia as a key influence in the legend's creation and spread. He argues the legend provides an origin for Catalonia independent of the Frankish crown, to which, historically, the earliest Catalan Counts owed allegiance. In an era of constant disputes over the frontiers of France and Aragon, this was politically useful. Furthermore, the legend served to justify noble power, as well as, given the easy accommodation of Otger and the nine barons to Frankish power, the non-confrontational attitude the Catalan nobility had taken towards their integration into the nascent Spanish state.

=== Spread of the legend in the Early Modern period ===
The legend of Otger spread rapidly and was repeated by many chroniclers from the late 15th to 17th centuries. These texts were frequently inspired by Tomich's version of the legend, with innovations introduced either by misunderstandings of older texts or inventions by the authors. Italian philosopher and historian Lorenzo Valla, probably writing in the 1440s while in the employ of Alfonso V of Aragon (who held extensive lands in modern-day Italy) mentioned Otger in his writings.

In the second half of the 16th century, texts written in Spanish began to include Otger, influenced by Catalan and Latin texts penned in the Kingdom of Aragon. In 1562, Alonzo de Santa Cruz, mistranslating an earlier Latin chronicle, De origine ac rebus gestis Regum Hispaniae written by Francesc Tarafa, which referred to "Otgerius Gollantes, a German with the cognomen Cathelon", split Otger into two individuals: Otger Gollant and Germano Cathelon. This doubling would sometimes be repeated by later authors.

The German Wolfgang Lazius gave a Germanic pedigree for Otger in a now lost text cited by 17th-century Catalan authors. According to Lazius, Otger descended from Theodbert of Bavaria and was son of Duke Grimoald and his second wife. He also stated that the name Otger derived from Ottikar, meaning "depopulator of the fields", and that he fought against Wamba of Toledo. Coll i Allentorn considers this to be largely invention based on the 1418 text's confusion over Otger's adversaries and Tomich's description of Otger as a German. The legend was also mentioned by Mercator and the French chronicler Genebrand.

It was during this period that Brother Marti Marquina claimed to have discovered a document in the archive of Poblet, which located Otger's grave in the ruined monastery of Sant Andreu d'Eixalada. This discovery was apocryphal, and the Latin epitaph supposedly found on the grave, which was quoted by Geronimo Pujades in the early 17th century, was almost certainly invented by Marquina.

Recounting of the legend by chroniclers continued into the 17th century. The last early modern authors to add significant contributions to the legend were Escolano in 1610, with his Decada primera de la Historia de la insigne y coronada Ciudad y Reyno de Valencia, Pujades in 1614, who attempted to reconcile the differing previous accounts of the legend, the Rossellonese Andreu Bosch in 1627, whose innovations included describing Otger as a Goth, and Corbera in 1629, who attempted an objective study of the legend. Corbera compiled a complete list of existing sources mentioning Otger, alongside lengthy quotes from them.

In 1676, Argaiz's La Perla de Cataluña added another detail to the legend, stating that Otger had built the castle on the mountain of Montserrat, which was named Castell Otger.

=== The legend during the Catalan Renaissance ===
The Catalan Renaissance (Catalan: Renaixença) was a revival movement of the Catalan language and culture which occurred in the 19th century. During this period, Catalan history was revisited by intellectuals, writing first in Spanish and then in the later 19th century in Catalan, to provide a noble past for Catalonia with heroic figures and events independent of those of Castile.

Among these intellectuals, historian Victor Balaguer in particular focused on figures who displayed an attitude of rebellion towards the established order, such as Indibilis and Mandonius, the Bagaudes, and Otger Cataló. Balaguer's account of Otger, in his 1860 Historia de Cataluña contained copious details on the hero's supposed deeds, and depicted him as carrying a club and wearing a lion-skin, motifs copied from the legend of Hercules. The lion-skin was not repeated in later works, however, the club was widely repeated by later authors and became a feature of the modern legend.

Poet Antoni Ferrer i Codina wrote a patriotic play in verse named Otger which debuted in 1885. The play takes place during the siege of Empùries, and depicts Otger, the bearer of a ferocious club, as the son of a Goth and a Moorish woman. Otger also features in the work of 19th-century poet Jacint Verdaguer, such as his epic poem, El Canigó.

=== Pàtria (2017 film) ===
In 2017, Pàtria, a film based on the legend of Otger, was released. Directed by Joan Frank Charansonnet, it starred Miquel Sitjar as Otger.

The film begins with a scene set in a 15th-century monastery in which a Catalan noble recounts an oral tradition relating to Otger and the Nine Barons to Pere Tomich. The film then depicts the story of the 8th century Otger which the noble had started to narrate. The film contains a love story as well as the campaign Otger fought against the Saracens, alongside some fantasy aspects and a witch-burning scene. It ends in Otger's death.

The film positions Otger and the Nine Barons as defenders of Catalonia, frequently making use of terms like "invaders", "occupiers" and "oppressors" to refer to the Arabs who, according to Otger, "mistreat the land". This focus reflected the contemporary political situation in Catalonia, where the Catalan-nationalist regional government was pushing for independence from Spain. The clear allusion to contemporary politics was viewed negatively by writers reviewing the film in El Nacional and El Confidencial, but was celebrated in Avui.

Both El Nacional and El Confidencial criticise the film for its depiction of the relationship between Christians and Muslims in medieval Iberia. El Confidencial argues that the film's portrayal of the "Saracen" emir is a rehash of old stereotypes of lascivious Arabs kidnapping Christian women. In El Nacional, Gustau Nerín points out that the Christians are presented as the true owners of the land, who are pacifists but nevertheless determined to "liberate every palm of earth from the hands of the outsiders" with "blood and iron". Nerín states that this attitude ignores the reality of medieval convivencia between Christians, Muslims and Jews in Catalonia.

== Historicity of Otger ==
There is no convincing historical evidence for the existence of an 8th-century Catalan military leader called Otger. The known tradition of Otger's existence dates only to the 15th century, although there is evidence that at least one earlier brief text mentioning Otger, dating to the 13th century at the earliest, may have existed. Modern scholars agree that the origins of the figure actually lie in literary depictions of early medieval Frankish conflict with Muslims in 8th century Al Andalus, especially those referring to Ogier the Dane, Roland and the Battle of Roncevalles.

Scholarly scepticism regarding the veracity of the legends regarding Otger was already apparent in the 15th century, with Miquel Carbonell's 1495 Chròniques d'Espanya. Carbonell denied any truth in the legend and described it as "without any foundation" and as "apocryphal and untrustworthy". Carbonell incorrectly considered Tomich to be the inventor of the legend, and stated that his relative, the humanist Jeroni Pau also doubted the existence of Otger.

Carbonell became the leading figure in a minority historiographic tradition that denied the existence of Otger, whereas Tomich was the standard bearer for the majority that accepted him. Throughout the 16th and 17th centuries, this debate continued, and was reflected in the frequent marginal notes and underlinings regarding the question of Otger's authenticity found in surviving manuscripts and books from this period.

16th century Aragonese historian Jerónimo Zurita argued against including the figure of Otger in his Annals of the Crown of Aragon, as he believed it to be a late invention. This decision was criticised by his contemporary Cristòfor Despuig, who argued that as the legend showed Catalonia in a good light, it was not important whether or not it was true. Eulalia Duran i Grau notes that this preference for "beautiful stories" could coexist with rigorous scholarship, but that early modern accounts of legendary figures such as Otger principally served to communicate the authors' "justification of the present, determination on the past and projections towards the future."

The controversy regarding the historicity of Otger continued until the 19th century, when Balaguer argued for his existence in his history of Catalonia, leading to severe criticism from his contemporary and peer Antoni de Bofarull.

== The Nine Barons of Fame ==
The Nine Barons of Fame (Catalan: Els nou barons de la fama; Spanish: Los nueve barones de la fama) are an element of many versions of the Otger story. First found in the 1431 text from the Paris library, they are a group of nine nobles who assisted Otger in his battles, each representing a different region of Catalonia and noble house. The invention of the nine barons was likely based on the 14th century literary figures, the Nine Worthies. It is a genealogical legend, detailing the origins of the principle noble families of Catalonia. Coll i Alentorn describes the division of Catalonia into 9 regions as "completely arbitrary", and points out that a literary division of the territory based on 12 regions also exists. Zurita, writing in the 16th century, noted that this division recalled the division of Aquitania into 9 counties.

=== Historiography of the Nine Barons legend ===
The 1431 source is the earliest text mentioning the nine barons, and gives a list of nine counts, nine viscounts and nine vassals. The counts are given seats, which are listed in order from north to south before moving inland, but not personal names: Rossellon, Empúries, Barcelona, Tarragona, Urgell, Pallars, Cerdanya, Osona and Besulú. Coll i Alentorn suggests that it is possible that this list might be partially inspired by a Memorial possessed by Joan Oliver, a notary from Barcelona, quoted by Marquilles, which listed 12 counties.

Marquilles's 1448 text borrowed from the 1431 source, expanding it with further detail by giving the barons names and detailing the locations where they sought refuge after the death of Otger. Marquilles also differed from the 1431 text, which attributed the division of the reconquered Catalonia to Charlemagne, by stating that this division was ordered by Charlemagne but completed by his son Louis the Pious. This was in order to make the story fit with the known historical dates for the conquest of Catalonia by the Franks. The names chosen by Marquilles for the 9 barons were mostly based on those of prominent Catalan noble families in the 14th and 15th centuries.

Tomich's version was similar to Marquilles, but gave slightly different names and seats for the barons. It also adds a passage stating that Louis the Pious had ordered the Christians of Catalonia, who had been living under Muslim rule, to rebel, but that many had refused. For this cowardice, the king decreed that these Christians should be submitted to a form of serfdom known as remensa. The topic of remensa was contentious in 15th-century Catalonia, leading to rebellions and revolts, and so, when combined with the genealogical aspects of the nine barons story, the version found in Tomich serves to justify power and class differences in contemporary Catalan feudalism.

Earliest names attested for the Nine Barons of Fame
Marquilles (1431/1448)	Tomich (1438)	Notes on origin of the name
Naphiserus of Montcada	Naphiserus of Montcada	This name is likely a corruption of dapifer, a title meaning "steward".
Galcerindus is Galcerindus of Pinós	Galeceran Guerau of Pinós	Galceran was a common given name among the noble family of Pinós, becoming a surname. Galeceran Galceran is recorded in 1409.
Huc de Hugo of Mataplana	Hug of Mataplana	Hug was a common name in the lineage of Mataplana, born by 12th century troubadour Huguet de Mataplana.
Guillem of Cervera	Jou of Cervera	Guillem was a common name among the nobles of Cervera.
Guillem of Cervellő	Guerau Ramon of Cervellő	Guillem is a common name for medieval members of this lineage.
Guereu of Alemany	Pere of Alemany	Guereu was a common name in this medieval lineage, born by Guereu Alemany, governor of the Principality of Catalonia during Marquilles lifetime. The change to Pere Alemany was probably related to the presence of a character of that name the story of the assassination of Archbishop Guillem Ramon of Montcada.
Bernat of L'Anglesola	Ramon of L'Anglesola	Bernat was not common among the lineage of Anglesola, however, Ramon was frequently used.
Gisbert of Ribelles	Gispert of Ribelles	A Gisbert of Ribelles is documented in the 14th century, however, the most common given name in this family was Ponç.
Bernat Roger of Erill	Berenguer Roger of Erill	Bernat Roger was the name of the 13th century baron of Erill, still well known in the 15th century, who fought in a rebellion against Peter the Great of Aragon.

Lucio Marineo Siculo, writing in 1509, followed Tomich closely, but slightly altered the barons' names and suggested they were, like Otger, of German origin. In 1540, Pere Antoni Beuter wrote that the chief of the nine barons was called Otho or Otger Katazlot, claiming that his information was based on the "Chronicle of the Kings of Navarre". He also added further Germanic pedigrees for some of the nine barons, stating Napifer of Montcada was descended from the Dukes of Bavaria, and that the lord of Cervera descended from the Dukes of Savoy. He also attributes the division into nine parts to Ramon Berenguer I.

In 1610, Valencian cleric Gaspar Escolano referred to the nine barons as "aquellos nueve valerosos caballeros de la fama" (Spanish: Those nine valiant knights of fame), borrowing from the Spanish name of the Nine Worthies (Los Nueve de la Fama). This was the first use of the phrase "of fame" in relation to the nine barons.

In the 19th century, Balaguer and others expanded the details of the deeds of the nine barons, in their romantic retellings of the Otger legend.
