= Juan Planck =

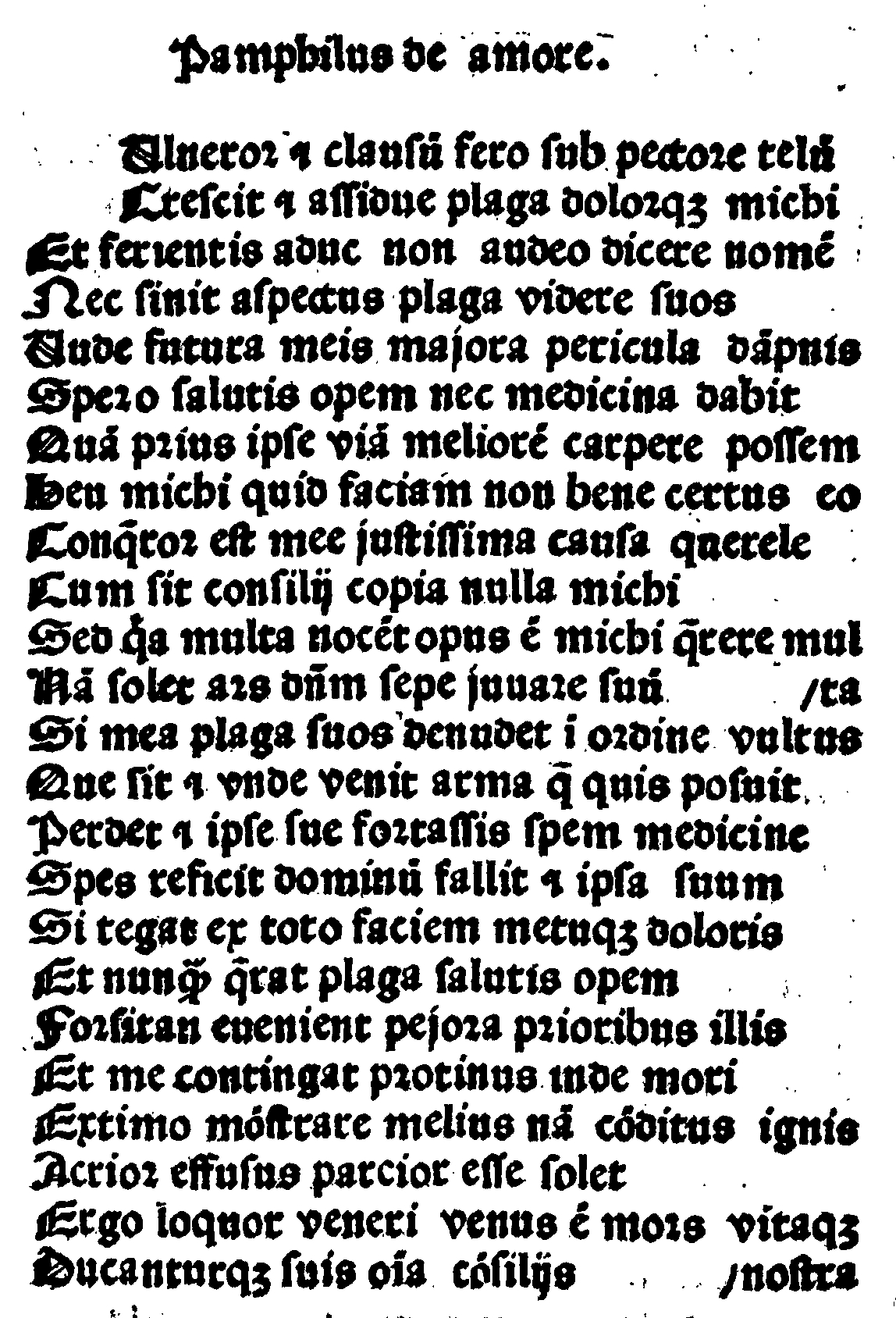
An incunable of Pamphilus de amore in printed c. 1480–1484 in Zaragoza by Pablo Hurus and Juan Planck

Juan Planck (also known as Juan Blanco, Johann Planck, Johannes Planck and possibly Johannes de Salsburga, Johann von Salzburg, fl. 1479–1484) was a fifteenth-century German cleric turned printer who became a founder of the printing business in Iberia.

== Career ==
Planck is thought to have collaborated with two other Germans, Enrique Botel, and Georgius von Holz, with Botel as the master craftsman teaching the other two, as early at 1473, possibly in Barcelona. In 1475, Planck published the first clearly dated printed book in Barcelona. After Holz's death, the remaining two renewed their arrangement in Zaragoza in 1477.

In 1477, Planck also began working with Pablo Hurus (with whose brother, Juan/Johann, he is not to be confused).

Planck never had his own press and his name does not appear in any colophon, but a series of editions have been attributed to him such as Ethica ad Nicchomacum (1473), printed with Botel and Holtz, Vita et transitus sancti Hieronymi (c. 1476–77), printed together with Botel and Paul Hurus, or the Fables of Aesop (1482) with Paul Hurus.

== Identification with Johannes de Salsburga ==
Planck may or may not be identical with the Johannes de Salsburga who worked alongside Paul Hurus in Barcelona, appearing alongside him in the colophon to a 1475 Barcelona edition of Perottus's Rudimenta Grammaticae. (Little else is known about Johannes de Salsburga; another possible identification is with one Juan Gherlinc). Johannes de Salsburga also printed the following volumes in Barcelona in 1475:

- In Catilinam orationes
- De Bello Iugurthino
- In C. Sallustium invectiva
- De coniuratione Catilinae
- Invectiva in M.T. Ciceronem
- Epitomae rerum Romanarum
