= Codina =

Codina may refer to:

- Codina (surname), list of people with the surname
- 17179 Codina (1999 TC224) is a Main-belt Asteroid
- Agathia codina, species of moth in the family Geometridae
- Genaro Codina, Zacatecas, municipality in Mexico
