= Kingdom of Sobrarbe =

Medieval kingdom in the Iberian Peninsula

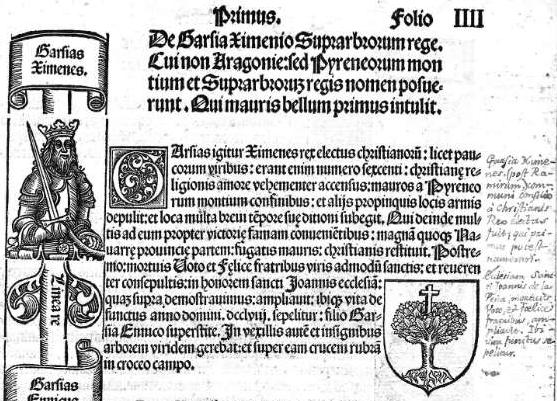
From the first page of the history of Sobrarbe in De Aragoniae Regibus, showing the first two kings and the cross in the tree which became Sobrarbe's heraldic emblem.

The Kingdom of Sobrarbe was the legendary predecessor to the Kingdom of Aragon and the modern region of Sobrarbe (from Latin super Arbem, on mount Arbe). According to the late medieval legend, the kingdom, with its capital at Aínsa, was a product of the Reconquista. The legend is based in part on the historical origins of the Kingdom of Pamplona.

== Legend and historiography ==
After the Muslim invasion of Spain, the local Christians of what was to become Sobrarbe met at "Espelunga de Galión" in the year 724, in the place where today stands the monastery of San Juan de la Peña. There they created an army to fight the invaders and elected as their leader a certain García (Garzía) Ximéniz. Since the Muslims had already taken Jaca, the chief city of the region, the Christians decided to attack Aínsa. After a prolonged siege they took the city and re-fortified it effectively. When the Muslims counter-besieged it with four times the troops the fall of the city appeared imminent. Then out of the sky appeared a vermillion cross atop an oak tree on a gold field. Interpreted as a sign from God, the cross encouraged the Christians and the Muslims were put to flight. In accordance with vows taken at Espelunga, García Ximéniz, in response to the victory, founded a hermitage dedicated to John the Baptist at the site. This evolved into the monastery of San Juan de la Peña under García's successors. The kingdom that was baptised at Aínsa they named Sobrarbe, because it was founded "on a tree" (sobre arbre) when the cross appeared there.

According to Gualberto Fabricio de Vagad in his Crónica de Aragón (1499), the second king of Sobrarbe, García Ennéguiz (Garci Íñigo), conquered Pamplona from the Muslims in the time of Charlemagne. He gives all the kings of Aragon a number as king of Sobrarbe, thus making Alfonso III of Aragon into the 20th king of Sobrarbe.

Attributed coat-of-arms of Sobrarbe

The image of the red cross on a tree against field of gold was incorporated into the Aragonese coat-of-arms in the top left quarter. By the fifteenth century the legend had been incorporated into the Aragonese national consciousness. It was given a full, historicising treatment in the five-volume Renaissance history of Aragon, De Aragoniae Regibus et eorum rebus gestis libri V (1509), by Lucio Marineo Sículo, who describes the reigns of its kings in turn. By the late sixteenth century its historicity was widely accepted and it appears in the fourth volume of the Corónica general de España (Córdoba: 1584) by Ambrosio de Morales, court historian of Philip II of Spain, among other general histories of the peninsula and of its kingdoms.

== Laws ==
The Fueros de Sobrarbe were the most influential component of the legend and a school of legal thought, the "foralists", arose in defence of Aragon's supposedly ancient customs. Claimed to be mostly fabricated, the laws have been studied in depth in English by Ralph E. Giesey. The Aragonese jurist Juan Ximénez Cerdán in his Letra intimada describes how the office of Justicia of Aragon was said to have arisen:

Certain peoples conquered from the Moors a certain part of the kingdom in the mountains of Sobrarbe, and since these were communities with neither governor nor alderman, and given that there were many disputes and debates among them, it was determined that, to avoid such problems and so that they might live in peace, they should elect a king to reign over them ... but that there should be a Judge between them and the king, who would hold the title of Justicia of Aragon. It is held by some that the Justicia was elected before the king, and that the king was elected under such conditions. Since then there has always been a Justicia of Aragon in the kingdom, cognisant of all procedures regarding the king, as much in petitioning as in defence.

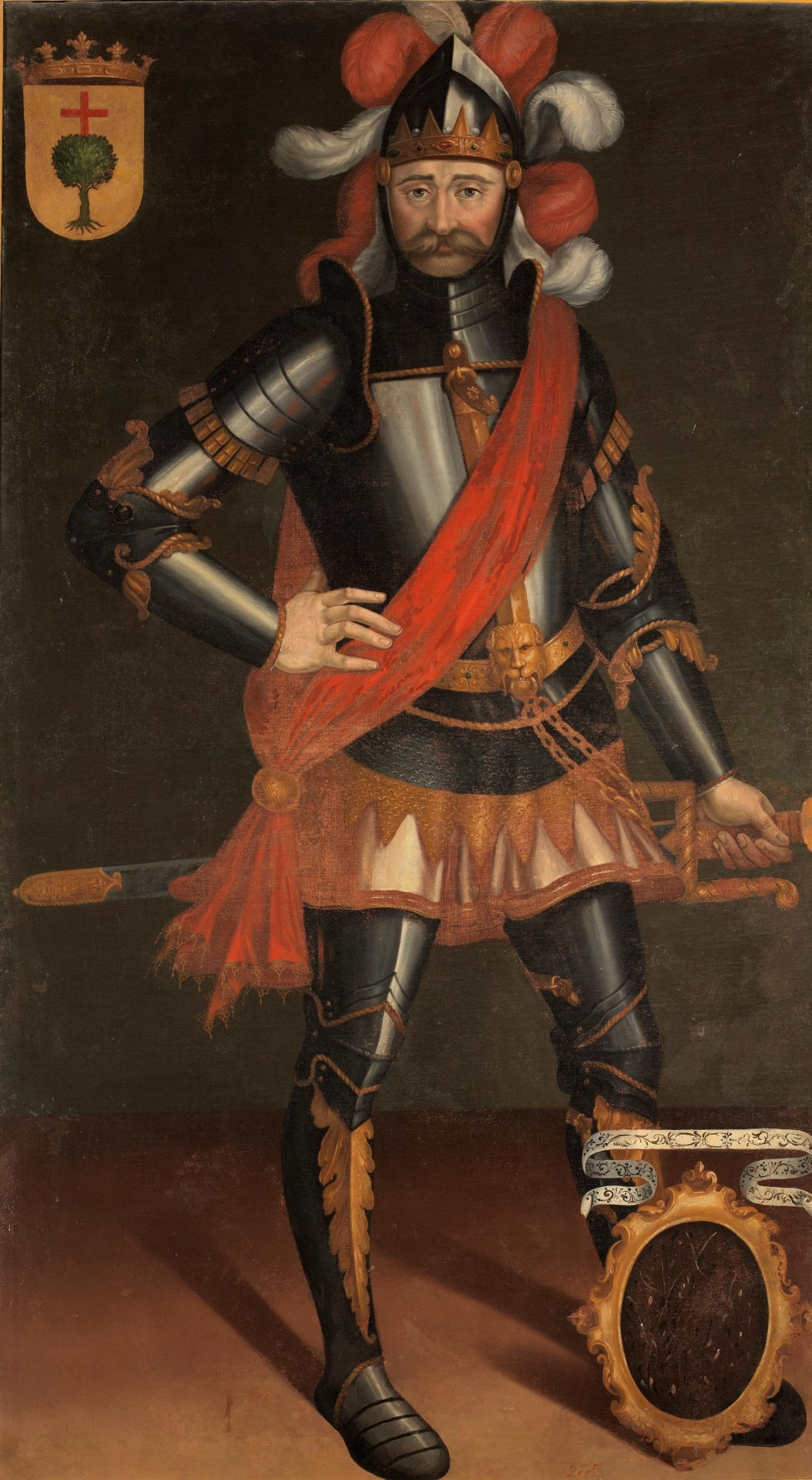
King García Ximéniz by Filippo Ariosto (1634)

Over a century after Cerdán, in 1552, the fueros of Aragon, commissioned by the Cortes, were published with a preface restating the legend of Sobrarbe in defence of the concept of rule of law and the precedence of the law to the king. In 1588 Jerónimo de Blancas published the influential treatise Aragonensium rerum commentarii, which contains the most complete account of the origins of the Justicia and the six fueros de Sobrarbe (Catalan furs de Sobrarb) which the king must accept in order to govern. In the 1580s in a number of cases argued before the tribunals in Zaragoza the laws of Sobrarbe were cited against royal authority, as in the "dispute of the foreign viceroy", when Philip II's appointment of a non-Aragonese viceroy was rejected. In 1625 Bartolomé Leonardo de Argensola wrote that the fueros "united those once irreconcilable qualities, monarchy and liberty, and for this reason the fueros of vassalage in Aragon are called liberties."

== List of legendary kings (and their historical counterparts) ==
- García Ximéniz (724–758)
- García Ennéguiz I (758–802)
- Fortún Garcés I (802–815)
- Sancho Garcés (815–832)
- Enneco Ariesta (868–870) → Íñigo Arista
- García Ennéguiz II (870–885) → García Íñiguez
- Fortún Garcés II (885–901) → Fortún Garcés
