= Braveheart =

1995 epic historical war drama film by Mel Gibson

- Theatrical release poster
- Directed by: Mel Gibson
- Written by: Randall Wallace
- Produced by: Mel Gibson; Alan Ladd Jr.; Bruce Davey
- Starring: Mel Gibson; Sophie Marceau; Patrick McGoohan; Catherine McCormack
- Cinematography: John Toll
- Edited by: Steven Rosenblum
- Music by: James Horner
- Production companies: Icon Productions; The Ladd Company
- Distributed by: Paramount Pictures (United States and Canada); 20th Century Fox (International)
- Release dates: May 18, 1995 (Seattle); May 24, 1995 (United States)
- Running time: 177 minutes
- Country: United States
- Language: English
- Budget: $53–72 million
- Box office: $209 million

Braveheart is a 1995 American epic historical war drama film directed and produced by Mel Gibson, who portrays Scottish warrior William Wallace in the First War of Scottish Independence. The film also stars Sophie Marceau, Patrick McGoohan, Catherine McCormack and Angus Macfadyen. The story is inspired by Blind Harry's 15th century epic poem The Actes and Deidis of the Illustre and Vallyeant Campioun Schir William Wallace and was adapted for the screen by Randall Wallace.

Development on the film initially started at Metro-Goldwyn-Mayer (MGM) when producer Alan Ladd Jr. picked up the project from Wallace, but when MGM was going through new management, Ladd left the studio and took the project with him. Despite initially declining, Gibson eventually decided to direct the film and to star as Wallace. The film, which was produced by Gibson's Icon Productions and The Ladd Company, was distributed by Paramount Pictures in the United States and Canada and by 20th Century Fox in other countries.

Released on May 24, 1995, Braveheart was a critical and commercial success, receiving praise for its battle scenes, production design, musical score, and acting performances, though it received some criticism for its historical inaccuracies. The film received numerous accolades; at the 68th Academy Awards, it was nominated for ten awards, winning five, including Best Picture and Best Director for Gibson. A legacy sequel, Robert the Bruce, was released in 2019.

== Plot ==
In 1280, English king Edward I, known as "Longshanks", conquers Scotland following the death of the Scots' king, who left no heir. Young William Wallace witnesses the aftermath of Longshanks' execution of several Scottish nobles, then loses his father and brother when they resist the English. He leaves home to be raised by his uncle, Argyle.

Years later, Longshanks grants his noblemen land and privileges in Scotland, including jus primae noctis, while his son Edward II marries French princess Isabelle. Meanwhile, an adult Wallace returns home and secretly marries his childhood friend Murron MacClannough. Soon after, Wallace rescues Murron from a soldier's assault, but Murron is subsequently captured and executed. In retribution, Wallace and the locals overthrow the garrison, beginning a rebellion that soon spreads. Longshanks orders Edward Wallace while he campaigns in France. Wallace defeats an army sent by the prince at Stirling, then invades England by sacking York. He also meets Robert the Bruce, a contender for the Scottish crown.

After returning to England, Longshanks sends Isabelle to negotiate with Wallace as a distraction from the movement of Longshanks' forces. Meeting Wallace, Isabelle becomes enamored with him and warns him of Longshanks' plans. Wallace faces Longshanks at Falkirk. During the battle, nobles Mornay and Lochlan withdraw, having been bribed by Longshanks, resulting in Wallace's smaller army being overwhelmed. Wallace also discovers Robert the Bruce had joined Longshanks. After helping Wallace escape, Robert vows to not be on the wrong side again. Later, Wallace kills Mornay and Lochlan for their betrayal and foils an assassination plot with Isabelle's help. Wallace and Isabelle spend the following night together, while Longshanks' health declines. At a secret meeting with other Scottish rebels in Edinburgh, Wallace is captured.

Realizing his father's role in Wallace's betrayal, Robert disowns his father. In England, Wallace is condemned to execution. After a final meeting with Wallace, Isabelle tells Longshanks, who is so ill that he can no longer speak, that his bloodline will end upon his death, as she is pregnant with Wallace's child, and will ensure that Longshanks' son spends as short a time as possible as monarch. At his execution, Wallace refuses to submit, even while being disemboweled. The magistrate encourages Wallace to seek mercy and be granted a quick death. Wallace instead shouts, "Freedom!", while Longshanks dies. Before being beheaded, Wallace sees a vision of Murron in the crowd. In 1314, Robert, now Scotland's king, faces the English at Bannockburn, and implores his men to fight with him as they did with Wallace. After Wallace's sword is thrown to land point-down in the ground, Robert leads the Scots to a final victory.

== Cast ==
- Mel Gibson as William Wallace
- Sophie Marceau as Isabelle
- Patrick McGoohan as Longshanks
- Catherine McCormack as Murron MacClannough
- Angus McFadyen as Robert the Bruce
- Brendan Gleeson as Hamish
- David O'Hara as Stephen
- James Robinson as young William Wallace
- Ian Bannen as Robert the Bruce's father
- James Cosmo as Campbell
- Brian Cox as Argyle Wallace
- Peter Hanly as Prince Edward
- Alun Armstrong as Mornay
- John Murtagh as Lochlan
- Peter Mullan as Veteran
- David McKay as Young Soldier
- Seán McGinley as Murron's father
- Gerda Stevenson as Murron's mother
- Stephen Billington as Phillip
- John Kavanaugh as Craig
- Tommy Flanagan as Morrison
- Rupert Vansittart as Lord Bottoms
- Tam White as McGregor
- Michael Byrne as Smythe
- Martin Murphy as Talmadge
- Gerard McSorley as Cheltham
- Richard Leaf as the Governor of York
- Bernard Horsfall as Balliol
- Jimmy Chisholm as Faudron
- Jeanne Marine as Nicolette
- Sean Lawlor as Malcolm Wallace
- Sandy Nelson as John Wallace

== Production ==
=== Development ===
Producer Alan Ladd Jr. initially had the project at MGM-Pathé Communications when he picked up the script from Randall Wallace. When Metro-Goldwyn-Mayer (MGM) was going through new management in 1993, Ladd left the studio and took some of its top properties, including Braveheart. Mel Gibson came across the script and even though he liked it, he initially passed on it. However, the thought of it kept coming back to him, and he ultimately decided to take on the project. John McTiernan. Terry Gilliam was also offered to direct the film, but he declined. Gibson was initially interested in directing only and considered Brad Pitt in the role of William Wallace, but later reluctantly agreed to play Wallace as well. He also considered Jason Patric for the role. Sean Connery was approached to play King Edward, but he declined due to other commitments. Gibson said that Connery's pronunciation of "Goulash" helped him with the Scottish accent for the film.

Gibson and his production company, Icon Productions, had difficulty raising enough money for the film. Warner Bros. was willing to fund the project on the condition that Gibson sign for another Lethal Weapon sequel, which he refused. Gibson eventually gained enough financing for the film, with Paramount Pictures financing a third of the budget in exchange for North American distribution rights to the film, and 20th Century Fox putting up the other two-thirds in exchange for foreign distribution rights.

=== Filming ===
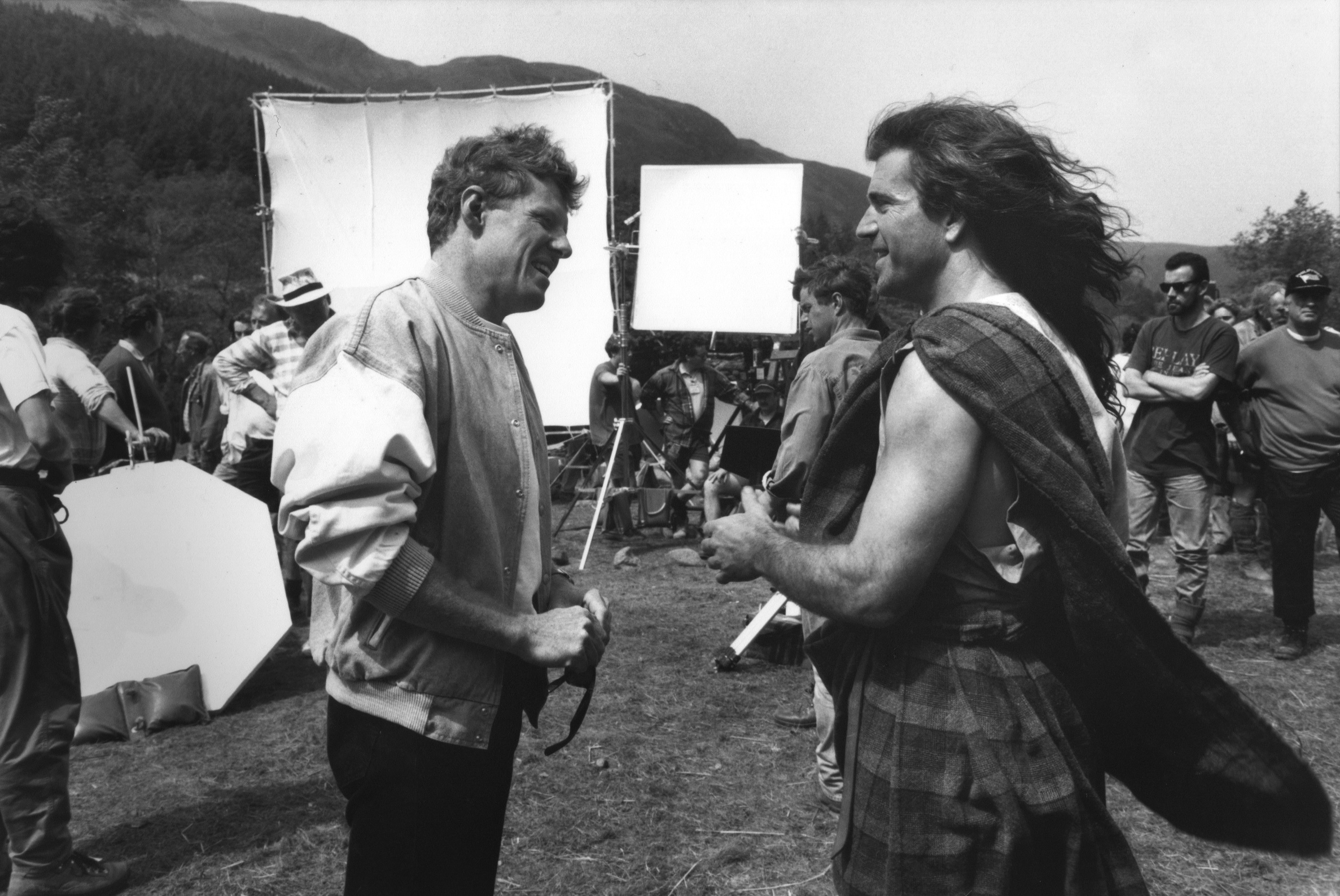
Gibson (right) on set with 20th Century Fox executive Scott Neeson

Filming was initially due to take place fully in the United Kingdom, but most of the shoot was moved to Ireland at short notice after lobbying from the Irish government and their offer to supply 1,600 members of the Irish Army Reserve as extras. Shooting was planned to take 12 weeks on location in Ireland and at Ardmore Studios, plus five weeks on location in Scotland. Principal photography on the film took place between June 6, 1994, and October 28, 1994. To lower costs, Gibson had the same extras portray both armies. The reservists had been given permission to grow beards and swapped their military uniforms for medieval garb. The film was shot in the anamorphic format with Panavision C- and E-Series lenses. Gibson also later said that while filming a battle scene a horse nearly "killed him" but his stunt double was able to save him as the horse fell.

Gibson had to tone down the film's battle scenes to avoid an NC-17 rating from the MPAA; the final version was rated R for "brutal medieval warfare". Gibson and editor Steven Rosenblum initially had a film at 195 minutes, but Sherry Lansing, who was the head of Paramount at the time, requested Gibson and Rosenblum to cut the film down to 177 minutes. According to Gibson in a 2016 interview with Collider, there is a four-hour version of the film, and he expressed interest in reassembling it if both Paramount and Fox were interested.

== Soundtrack ==
The score was composed and conducted by James Horner and performed by the London Symphony Orchestra. It is Horner's second of three collaborations with Mel Gibson as director. The score has gone on to be one of the most commercially successful soundtracks of all time. It received considerable acclaim from film critics and audiences and was nominated for a number of awards, including the Academy Award, Saturn Award, BAFTA Award, and Golden Globe Award.

== Release ==
Braveheart premiered at the Seattle International Film Festival on May 18, 1995, and received its wide release in U.S. cinemas six days later.

=== Home media ===
Braveheart was released on LaserDisc in both pan and scan and widescreen on March 12, 1996. That same day, it was also made available on VHS in pan and scan only and was re-issued in widescreen on August 27.

The film was released on DVD on August 29, 2000. This edition included the film only in widescreen, a commentary track by Gibson, a behind-the-scenes featurette, along the trailers.

It was released on Blu-ray as part of the Paramount Sapphire Series on September 1, 2009. It included the DVD features along with new bonus material. It was released on 4K UHD Blu-ray as part of the 4K upgrade of the Paramount Sapphire Series on May 15, 2018.

== Reception ==
=== Box office ===
Braveheart grossed $75.5 million in the United States and Canada and $133.5 million in other territories, for a worldwide total of $209.0 million, against a budget of $53–$72 million. It spent nine non-consecutive weeks in the Top 10 at the US box office – its first seven weeks, then two more weeks during its fifth month in theatres.

=== Critical response ===
On the review aggregator website Rotten Tomatoes, 74% of 140 critics' reviews are positive, with an average rating of 7.4/10. The website's consensus reads: "Distractingly violent and historically dodgy, Mel Gibson's Braveheart justifies its epic length by delivering enough sweeping action, drama, and romance to match its ambition." Metacritic, which uses a weighted average, assigned the film a score of 68 out of 100, based on 20 critics, indicating "generally favorable" reviews. Audiences polled by CinemaScore gave the film an average grade of "A−" on an A+ to F scale.

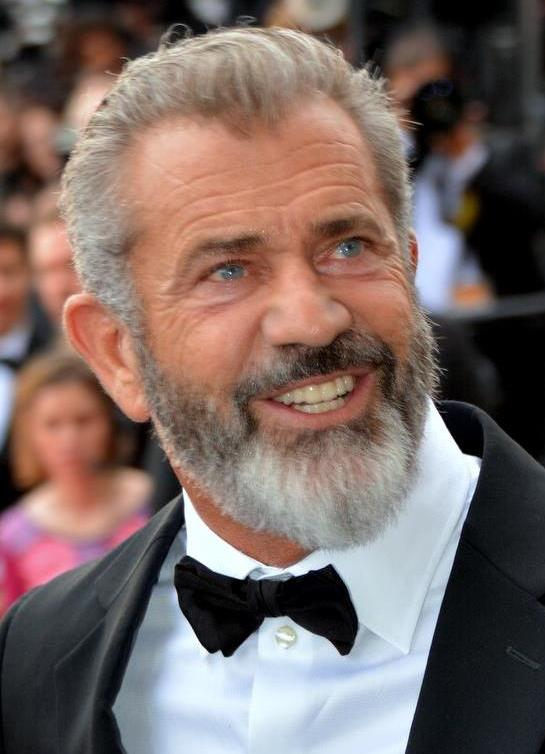
Gibson's work on Braveheart earned him the Academy Award for Best Director.

Caryn James of The New York Times praised the film, calling it "one of the most spectacular entertainments in years." Roger Ebert gave the film three and a half out of four stars, calling it "An action epic with the spirit of the Hollywood swordplay classics and the grungy ferocity of The Road Warrior." In a positive review, Gene Siskel wrote that "in addition to staging battle scenes well, Gibson also manages to recreate the filth and mood of 700 years ago." Peter Travers of Rolling Stone felt that "though the film dawdles a bit with the shimmery, dappled love stuff involving Wallace with a Scottish peasant and a French princess, the action will pin you to your seat." The depiction of the Battle of Stirling was listed by CNN as one of the best battles in cinema history.

Not all reviews were positive. Richard Schickel of Time magazine argued that "everybody knows that a non-blubbering clause is standard in all movie stars' contracts. Too bad there isn't one banning self-indulgence when they direct." Peter Stack of the San Francisco Chronicle felt "at times the film seems an obsessive ode to Mel Gibson machismo." In a 2005 poll by British film magazine Empire, Braveheart was No. 1 on their list of "The Top 10 Worst Pictures to Win Best Picture Oscar". Empire readers had previously voted Braveheart the best film of 1995.

Alex von Tunzelmann of The Guardian gave the film a grade of C−, saying: "Seemingly intended as a piece of anti-English propaganda, Braveheart offers an even greater insult to Scotland by making a total pig's ear of its heritage. 'Historians from England will say I am a liar,' intones the voiceover, 'but history is written by those who have hanged heroes.' Well, that's me told: but, regardless of whether you read English or Scottish historians on the matter, Braveheart still serves up a great big steaming haggis of lies." In a 2012 article, Nathan Kamal called the film "hugely overrated", criticizing the characters as one-dimensional, in particular noting the lack of benevolent English characters and questioning Wallace and Isabella's romance after the two had known each other for just one scene.

=== Effect on tourism ===
The European premiere was on September 3, 1995, in Stirling.

In 1996, the year after the film was released, the annual three-day "Braveheart Conference" at Stirling Castle attracted fans of Braveheart, increasing the conference's attendance to 167,000 from 66,000 in the previous year. In the following year, research on visitors to the Stirling area indicated that 55% of the visitors had seen Braveheart. Of visitors from outside Scotland, 15% of those who saw Braveheart said it influenced their decision to visit the country. Of all visitors who saw Braveheart, 39% said the film influenced in part their decision to visit Stirling, and 19% said the film was one of the main reasons for their visit. In the same year, a tourism report said that the "Braveheart effect" earned Scotland £7 million to £15 million in tourist revenue, and the report led to various national organizations encouraging international film productions to take place in Scotland.

The film generated huge interest in Scotland and in Scottish history, not only around the world, but also in Scotland itself. At a Braveheart Convention in 1997, held in Stirling the day after the Scottish Devolution vote and attended by 200 delegates from around the world, Braveheart author Randall Wallace, Seoras Wallace of the Wallace Clan, Scottish historian David Ross and Bláithín FitzGerald from Ireland gave lectures on various aspects of the film. Several of the actors also attended including James Robinson (Young William), Andrew Weir (Young Hamish), Julie Austin (the young bride) and Mhairi Calvey (Young Murron).

=== Awards and honors ===
Braveheart was nominated for many awards during the 1995 awards season, though it was not viewed as a frontrunner compared to films such as Apollo 13, Il Postino: The Postman, Leaving Las Vegas, Sense and Sensibility, and The Usual Suspects. It was only after the film won the Golden Globe Award for Best Director at the 53rd Golden Globe Awards that it was viewed as a serious Oscar contender.

When the nominations were announced for the 68th Academy Awards, Braveheart received ten Academy Award nominations, and a month later, won five including Best Picture, Best Director for Gibson, Best Cinematography, Best Sound Effects Editing, and Best Makeup. Braveheart became the ninth film to win Best Picture with no acting nominations and is one of only four films to win Best Picture without being nominated for the Screen Actors Guild Award for Outstanding Performance by a Cast in a Motion Picture, the others being The Shape of Water in 2017, Green Book in 2018, and Nomadland in 2020.

The film also won the Writers Guild of America Award for Best Original Screenplay. In 2010, the Independent Film & Television Alliance selected the film as one of the 30 Most Significant Independent Films of the last 30 years.

Award	Category	Recipient(s)	Result
20/20 Awards	Best Cinematography	John Toll	Nominated
20/20 Awards	Best Costume Design	Charles Knode	Nominated
20/20 Awards	Best Makeup	Peter Frampton, Paul Pattison and Lois Burwell	Won
20/20 Awards	Best Original Score	James Horner	Nominated
20/20 Awards	Best Sound		Nominated
Academy Awards	Best Picture	Mel Gibson, Bruce Davey and Alan Ladd Jr.	Won
Academy Awards	Best Director	Mel Gibson	Won
Academy Awards	Best Screenplay – Written Directly for the Screen	Randall Wallace	Nominated
Academy Awards	Best Cinematography	John Toll	Won
Academy Awards	Best Costume Design	Charles Knode	Nominated
Academy Awards	Best Film Editing	Steven Rosenblum	Nominated
Academy Awards	Best Makeup	Peter Frampton, Paul Pattison and Lois Burwell	Won
Academy Awards	Best Original Dramatic Score	James Horner	Nominated
Academy Awards	Best Sound	Andy Nelson, Scott Millan, Anna Behlmer and Brian Simmons	Nominated
Academy Awards	Best Sound Effects Editing	Lon Bender and Per Hallberg	Won
American Cinema Editors Awards	Best Edited Feature Film	Steven Rosenblum	Won
American Cinema Foundation Awards	Feature Film		Won
American Society of Cinematographers Awards	Outstanding Achievement in Cinematography in Theatrical Releases	John Toll	Won
Awards Circuit Community Awards	Best Director	Mel Gibson	Nominated
Awards Circuit Community Awards	Best Original Screenplay	Randall Wallace	Nominated
Awards Circuit Community Awards	Best Art Direction	Thomas E. Sanders and Peter Howitt	Won
Awards Circuit Community Awards	Best Cinematography	John Toll	Nominated
Awards Circuit Community Awards	Best Costume Design	Charles Knode	Won
Awards Circuit Community Awards	Best Film Editing	Steven Rosenblum	Nominated
Awards Circuit Community Awards	Best Makeup & Hairstyling	Peter Frampton, Paul Pattison and Lois Burwell	Won
Awards Circuit Community Awards	Best Original Score	James Horner	Won
Awards Circuit Community Awards	Best Sound		Nominated
Awards Circuit Community Awards	Best Stunt Ensemble		Won
British Academy Film Awards	Best Direction	Mel Gibson	Nominated
British Academy Film Awards	Best Cinematography	John Toll	Won
British Academy Film Awards	Best Costume Design	Charles Knode	Won
British Academy Film Awards	Best Film Music	James Horner	Nominated
British Academy Film Awards	Best Makeup	Peter Frampton, Paul Pattison and Lois Burwell	Nominated
British Academy Film Awards	Best Production Design	Thomas E. Sanders	Nominated
British Academy Film Awards	Best Sound	Andy Nelson, Scott Millan, Anna Behlmer and Brian Simmons	Won
Camerimage	Golden Frog	John Toll	Nominated
Cinema Audio Society Awards	Outstanding Achievement in Sound Mixing for Motion Pictures	Andy Nelson, Scott Millan, Anna Behlmer and Brian Simmons	Nominated
Cinema Writers Circle Awards	Best Foreign Film	Mel Gibson	Won (Note: Tied with Ed Wood.)
Critics' Choice Awards	Best Director	Mel Gibson	Won
Dallas-Fort Worth Film Critics Association Awards	Best Picture		Nominated
Dallas-Fort Worth Film Critics Association Awards	Best Cinematography	John Toll	Won
Directors Guild of America Awards	Outstanding Directorial Achievement in Motion Pictures	Mel Gibson	Nominated
Empire Awards	Best Film		Won
Flaiano Prizes	Best Foreign Actress	Catherine McCormack	Won
Golden Globe Awards	Best Motion Picture – Drama		Nominated
Golden Globe Awards	Best Director – Motion Picture	Mel Gibson	Won
Golden Globe Awards	Best Screenplay – Motion Picture	Randall Wallace	Nominated
Golden Globe Awards	Best Original Score – Motion Picture	James Horner	Nominated
Golden Reel Awards	Best Sound Editing – Dialogue	Mark LaPointe	Won
Golden Reel Awards	Best Sound Editing – Sound Effects	Lon Bender and Per Hallberg	Won (Note: Tied with George Watters II for Crimson Tide.)
International Film Music Critics Association Awards	Best Archival Release of an Existing Score – Re-Release or Re-Recording	James Horner, Dan Goldwasser, Mike Matessino, Jim Titus and Jeff Bond	Nominated
Jupiter Awards	Best International Director	Mel Gibson	Won
Movieguide Awards	Best Movie for Mature Audiences		Won
MTV Movie Awards	Best Movie		Nominated
MTV Movie Awards	Best Male Performance	Mel Gibson	Nominated
MTV Movie Awards	Most Desirable Male	Mel Gibson	Nominated
MTV Movie Awards	Best Action Sequence	Battle of Stirling	Won
National Board of Review Awards	Top Ten Films		9th Place
National Board of Review Awards	Special Filmmaking Achievement	Mel Gibson	Won
Publicists Guild of America Awards	Motion Picture		Won
Saturn Awards	Best Action/Adventure Film		Nominated
Saturn Awards	Best Costume Design	Charles Knode	Nominated
Saturn Awards	Best Music	James Horner	Nominated
Southeastern Film Critics Association Awards	Best Picture		2nd Place
Turkish Film Critics Association Awards	Best Foreign Film		3rd Place
Writers Guild of America Awards	Best Screenplay – Written Directly for the Screenplay	Randall Wallace	Won

American Film Institute lists

- AFI's 100 Years ... 100 Thrills – No. 91
- AFI's 100 Years...100 Cheers – No. 62

=== Cultural effects and accusations of Anglophobia ===
Lin Anderson, author of Braveheart: From Hollywood To Holyrood, credits the film with playing a significant role in affecting the Scottish political landscape in the mid- to late 1990s. Peter Jackson cited Braveheart as an influence in making the Lord of the Rings film trilogy. However, noted medieval historian Robert Bartlett was certain that “The portrayal of the English who appear in the film does indeed support the view that Braveheart is Anglophobic.”

Sections of the media accused the film of harbouring anti-English sentiment. The Economist called it "xenophobic", and John Sutherland writing in The Guardian stated that: "Braveheart gave full rein to a toxic Anglophobia". In The Times, Colin McArthur said "the political effects are truly pernicious. It's a xenophobic film." Ian Burrell of The Independent has said, "The Braveheart phenomenon, a Hollywood-inspired rise in Scottish nationalism, has been linked to a rise in anti-English prejudice".

=== Wallace Monument ===
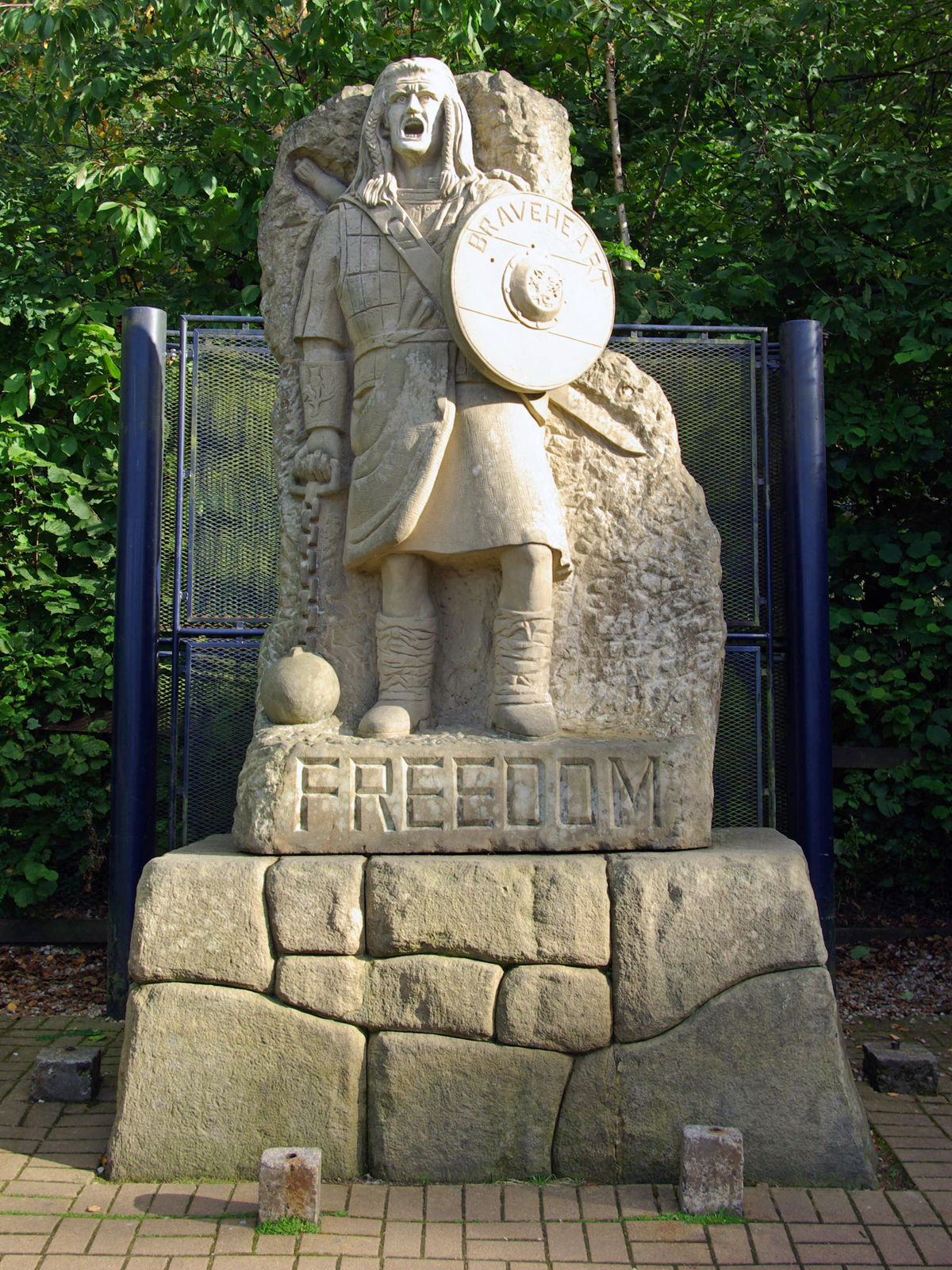
Tom Church's controversial statue of Gibson as Wallace

In 1997, a 12-foot (3.7 m), 13-tonne (13-long-ton; 14-short-ton) sandstone statue depicting Mel Gibson as William Wallace in Braveheart was placed in the car park of the Wallace Monument near Stirling, Scotland. The statue, which was the work of Tom Church, a monumental mason from Brechin, included the word 'Braveheart' on Wallace's shield. The installation became the cause of much controversy; one local resident stated that it was wrong to "desecrate the main memorial to Wallace with a lump of crap".

In 1998, someone wielding a hammer vandalized the statue's face. After repairs were made, the statue was encased in a cage every night to prevent further vandalism. This only incited more calls for the statue to be removed, as it then appeared that the Gibson/Wallace figure was imprisoned. The statue was described as "among the most loathed pieces of public art in Scotland". In 2008, the statue was returned to its sculptor to make room for a new visitor centre being built at the foot of the Wallace Monument.

== Historical accuracy ==
Elizabeth Ewan describes Braveheart as a film that "almost totally sacrifices historical accuracy for epic adventure". It has been described as one of the most historically inaccurate modern films. Sharon Krossa noted that the film contains numerous historical inaccuracies, beginning with the wearing of belted plaid (feileadh mór léine), which was not introduced until the 16th century, by Wallace and his men. In that period "no Scots [...] wore belted plaids (let alone kilts of any kind)." Moreover, when Highlanders finally did begin wearing the belted plaid, it was not "in the rather bizarre style depicted in the film". She compares the inaccuracy to "a film about Colonial America showing the colonial men wearing 20th-century business suits, but with the jackets worn back-to-front instead of the right way around." In a previous essay about the film, she wrote, "The events aren't accurate, the dates aren't accurate, the characters aren't accurate, the names aren't accurate, the clothes aren't accurate—in short, just about nothing is accurate." Peter Traquair has referred to Wallace's "farcical representation as a wild and hairy highlander painted with woad (1,000 years too late) running amok in a tartan kilt (500 years too early)." Caroline White of The Times described the film as being made up of a "litany of fibs." Irish historian Seán Duffy remarked that "the battle of Stirling Bridge could have done with a bridge."

In 2009, the film was second on a list of "most historically inaccurate movies" in The Times. In the humorous non-fictional historiography An Utterly Impartial History of Britain (2007), author John O'Farrell claims that Braveheart could not have been more historically inaccurate, even if a Plasticine dog had been inserted in the film and the title changed to "William Wallace and Gromit".

Randall Wallace, who wrote the screenplay, has acknowledged Blind Harry's 15th-century epic poem The Acts and Deeds of Sir William Wallace, Knight of Elderslie, as a major inspiration for the film. In defending his script, Randall Wallace has said, "Is Blind Harry true? I don't know. I know that it spoke to my heart and that's what matters to me, that it spoke to my heart." Blind Harry's poem is not regarded as historically accurate, and although some incidents in the film that are not historically accurate are taken from Blind Harry (e.g. the hanging of Scottish nobles at the start), there are large parts that are based neither on history nor Blind Harry (e.g. Wallace's affair with Princess Isabella).

In the DVD audio commentary of Braveheart, Mel Gibson acknowledged the historical inaccuracies but defended his choices as director, noting that the way events were portrayed in the film was much more "cinematically compelling" than the historical fact or conventional mythologies.

=== Jus primae noctis ===
Edward Longshanks is shown invoking Jus primae noctis in the film, allowing the lord of a medieval estate to take the virginity of his serfs' maiden daughters on their wedding nights. Critical medieval scholarship regards this supposed right as a myth: "the simple reason why we are dealing with a myth here rests in the surprising fact that practically all writers who make any such claims have never been able or willing to cite any trustworthy source, if they have any."

=== Occupation and independence ===
The film suggests Scotland had been under English occupation for some time, at least during Wallace's childhood, and in the run-up to the Battle of Falkirk Wallace says to the younger Bruce, "[W]e'll have what none of us have ever had before, a country of our own." In fact, Scotland had been invaded by England only the year before Wallace's rebellion; before the death of King Alexander III it had been a fully separate kingdom. In the film, William Wallace uses the phrase “hundred years of theft, rape, and murder” to describe the relationship between England and Scotland, which has been criticised for not accurately representing the two nations' relationship at the time. The sister of King Edward I of England, Margaret of England, was married to Alexander III. They had been married at York Minster in 1251 amidst friendly relations between the two royal families. As Robert Bartlett wrote “In fact, in the hundred years before 1297, the year of that battle [of Dunbar], the king of England had led an army into Scotland only once, for ten days in January 1216.”

=== Portrayal of William Wallace ===
As John Shelton Lawrence and Robert Jewett writes, "Because [William] Wallace is one of Scotland's most important national heroes and because he lived in the very distant past, much that is believed about him is probably the stuff of legend. But there is a factual strand that historians agree to", summarized from Scots scholar Matt Ewart:

Wallace was born into the gentry of Scotland; his father lived until he was 18, his mother until his 24th year; he killed the sheriff of Lanark when he was 27, apparently after the murder of his wife; he led a group of commoners against the English in a very successful battle at Stirling in 1297, temporarily receiving appointment as guardian; Wallace's reputation as a military leader was ruined in the same year of 1297, leading to his resignation as guardian; he spent several years of exile in France before being captured by the English at Glasgow, this resulting in his trial for treason and his cruel execution.

A. E. Christa Canitz writes about the historical William Wallace further: "[He] was a younger son of the Scottish gentry, usually accompanied by his own chaplain, well-educated, and eventually, having been appointed Guardian of the Kingdom of Scotland, engaged in diplomatic correspondence with the Hanseatic cities of Lübeck and Hamburg". She finds that in Braveheart, "any hint of his descent from the lowland gentry (i.e., the lesser nobility) is erased, and he is presented as an economically and politically marginalized Highlander and 'a farmer'—as one with the common peasant, and with a strong spiritual connection to the land which he is destined to liberate."

Colin McArthur writes that Braveheart "constructs Wallace as a kind of modern, nationalist guerrilla leader in a period half a millennium before the appearance of nationalism on the historical stage as a concept under which disparate classes and interests might be mobilised within a nation state." Writing about Braveheart's "omissions of verified historical facts", McArthur notes that Wallace made "overtures to Edward I seeking less severe treatment after his defeat at Falkirk", as well as "the well-documented fact of Wallace's having resorted to conscription and his willingness to hang those who refused to serve." Canitz posits that depicting "such lack of class solidarity" as the conscriptions and related hangings "would contaminate the movie's image of Wallace as the morally irreproachable primus inter pares among his peasant fighters."

=== Portrayal of Isabella of France ===
Isabella of France is shown spending a night with Wallace after the Battle of Falkirk. She later tells Edward I she is pregnant with Wallace's child, implied to be Edward III. In reality, Isabella was a child and living in France at the time of the Battle of Falkirk, was not married to Edward II until he was already king, and Edward III was born seven years after Wallace's execution in 1305. The breakdown of the couple's relationship over his liaisons, and the menacing suggestion to a dying Longshanks that she would overthrow and destroy Edward II mirror and foreshadow actual facts; although not until 1326, over 20 years after Wallace's death, Isabella and her lover Roger Mortimer would depose – and later allegedly murder – Edward II.

=== Portrayal of Robert the Bruce ===
Robert the Bruce did change sides between the Scots loyalists and the English more than once in the earlier stages of the Wars of Scottish Independence, but he probably did not fight on the English side at the Battle of Falkirk (although this claim does appear in a few medieval sources). Later, the Battle of Bannockburn was not a spontaneous battle soon after Wallace's execution; he had already been fighting a guerrilla campaign against the English for eight years. His title before becoming king was Earl of Carrick, not Earl of Bruce. Bruce's father is portrayed as an infirm leper, although it was Bruce himself who allegedly suffered from leprosy in later life. The actual Bruce's machinations around Wallace, rather than the meek idealist in the film, suggests the father–son relationship represent different aspects of the historical Bruce's character. In the film, Bruce's father betrays Wallace to his son's disgust, calling it the price of his son's crown, when in real life Wallace was betrayed by the nobleman John de Menteith.

=== Portrayal of Longshanks and Prince Edward ===
The actual Edward I was ruthless and temperamental, but the film exaggerates his negative aspects for effect. Edward enjoyed poetry and harp music, was a devoted and loving husband to his wife Eleanor of Castile, and as a religious man, he gave generously to charity; the film's scene where he scoffs cynically at Isabella for distributing gold to the poor after Wallace refuses it as a bribe would have been unlikely. Furthermore, Edward died almost two years after Wallace's execution, not on the same day.

The depiction of the future Edward II as an effeminate homosexual drew accusations of homophobia against Gibson.

We cut a scene out, unfortunately ... where you really got to know that character [Edward II] and to understand his plight and his pain ... But it just stopped the film in the first act so much that you thought, 'When's this story going to start?'

Gibson defended his depiction of Prince Edward as weak and ineffectual, saying:

I'm just trying to respond to history. You can cite other examples—Alexander the Great, for example, who conquered the entire world, was also a homosexual. But this story isn't about Alexander the Great. It's about Edward II.

In response to Longshanks' murder of the prince's lover, Phillip, Gibson replied: "The fact that King Edward throws this character out a window has nothing to do with him being gay ... He's terrible to his son, to everybody." Gibson asserted that the reason Longshanks kills his son's lover is that the king is a "psychopath".

=== Wallace's military campaign ===
"MacGregors from the next glen" joining Wallace shortly after the action at Lanark is dubious, since it is questionable whether Clan Gregor existed at that stage, and when they did emerge their traditional home was Glen Orchy, some distance from Lanark.

Wallace did win an important victory at the Battle of Stirling Bridge, but the version in Braveheart is highly inaccurate, as it has no bridge (or Andrew Moray, joint commander of the Scots army, who was fatally wounded in the battle). Later, Wallace did carry out a large-scale raid into the north of England, but he did not get as far south as York, nor did he kill Edward I's nephew.

The "Irish conscripts" at the Battle of Falkirk are unhistorical; there were no Irish troops at Falkirk (although many of the English army were, in fact, Welsh).

The two-handed long swords used by Gibson in the film were not in wide use in the period. A one-handed sword and shield would have been more accurate and more efficient, since in the enemy army there were a lot of archers.

== Sequel ==
A sequel, Robert the Bruce (2019), continues directly on from Braveheart and features Robert the Bruce, with Angus Macfadyen reprising his role from Braveheart.

== See also ==
- Outlaw King, which depicts events that occurred immediately after the events in Braveheart
- Rob Roy, a historical action drama film featuring Robert Roy MacGregor, an 18th-century Scottish clan chief, also released in 1995
- Pàtria, an independent film from Spain's Catalonia, depicting the fictional Catalan national hero, Otger Cataló's fight to liberate Catalonia from the Moors

== Bibliography ==
- Bartlett, Robert (2022). The Middle Ages and the Movies. London: Reaktion Books Ltd. ISBN 9781789145533.
