= Pamphilus de amore =

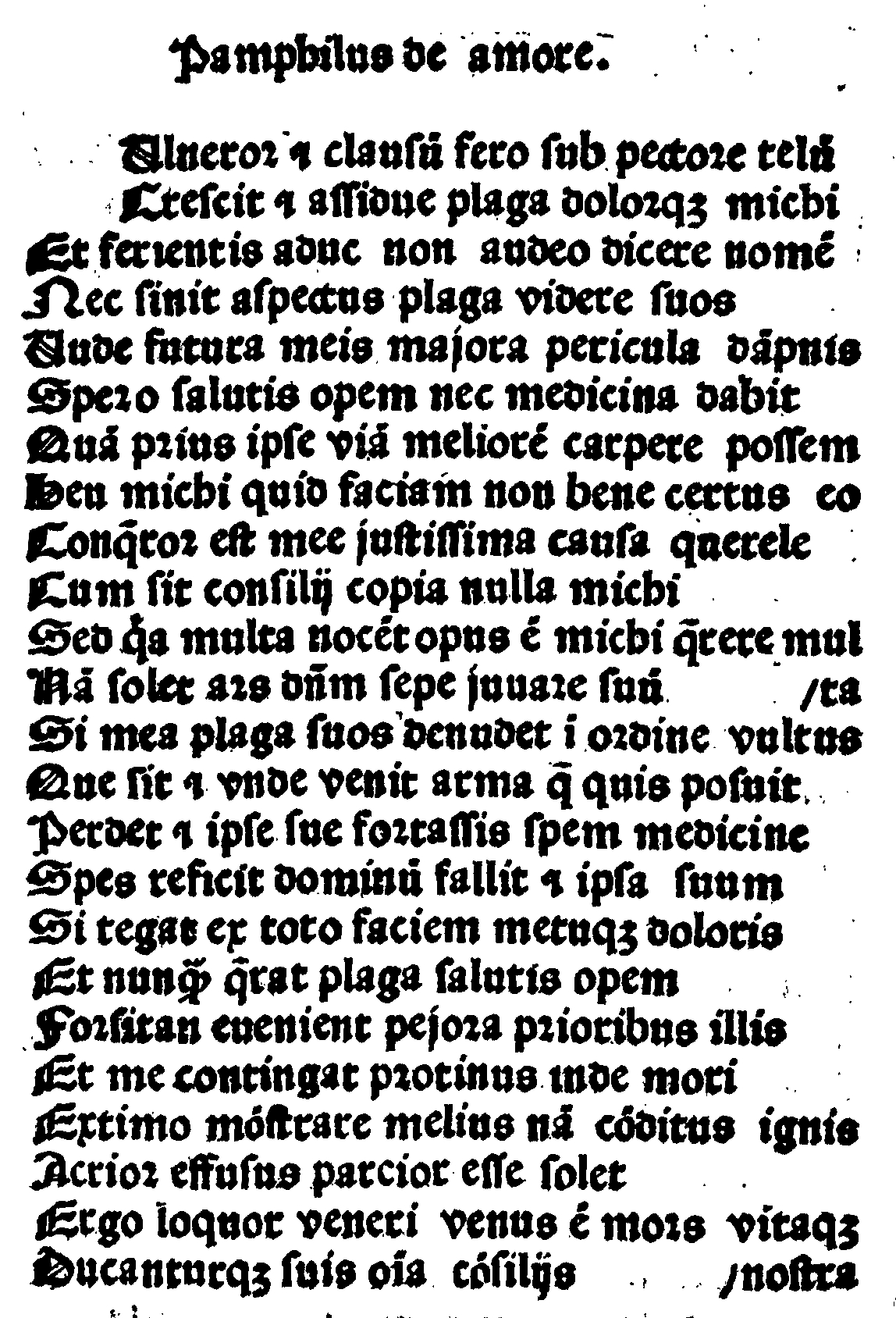
Pamphilus de amore in an incunable printed ca. 1480–1484 in Zaragoza by Pablo Hurus and Juan Planck

Pamphilus de amore (or, simply, Pamphilus or Pamfilus) is a 780-line, 12th-century Latin comedic play, probably composed in France, but possibly Spain. It was "one of the most influential and important of the many pseudo-Ovidian productions concerning the 'arts of Love'" in medieval Europe, and "the most famous and influential of the medieval elegiac comedies, especially in Spain". The protagonists are Pamphilus and Galatea, with Pamphilus seeking to woo her through a procuress (as with the procuress in Book 1.8 of Ovid's Amores).

== Style ==
The play was one of the works that many boys learning Latin in the Middle Ages would study. The hero is presented as falling in love with the virgin Galathea, yet he does not set about winning her heart, despite some initial encouragement. Instead he "pays an old woman to entrap her and, despite her protestations, rapes her. Pamphilus and the old woman argue that she should accept the situation... but her last words are despondent: 'There is no hope of happiness for me.'"

According to Thomas Jay Garbáty, "The Latin original abounds in all aspects of medieval rhetoric as outlined by grammarian Geoffrey de Vinsauf, in his Poetria Nova, specifically repetitio, paradox, oxymoron, alliteration. It is obvious that the author sacrificed much dramatic tension and liveliness for elegance of style."

== Influence ==
Pamphilus de amore gave rise to the word pamphlet, in the sense of a small work issued by itself without covers, because the poem was popular and widely copied and circulated on its own, forming a slim codex. The word came into Middle English in about 1387 as pamphilet or panflet.

Pamphilus soon became widely read: by the early 13th century, it was being quoted and anthologised in England, France, Provence, and Italy. It is first attested in the Netherlands about 1250, in Germany about 1280, and Castile about 1330. It remained popular in England into the late 15th century. It was translated into Old Norse in the 13th century as Pamphilus ok Galathea, and into French as Pamphile et Galatée by Jean Brasdefer (about 1300/1315).

In England, the poem was known to John Gower and Geoffrey Chaucer, Chaucer drawing on it particularly in The Franklin's Tale and Troilus and Criseyde. It also influenced the Roman de la Rose; Boccaccio's Fiammetta drew inspiration from it; and it was adapted in Juan Ruiz's Don Melon/Dona Endrina episode in the Libro de Buen Amor in the earlier 14th century.

== Editions and translations ==
- Alphonse Baudouin, ed., Pamphile, ou l'Art d'étre aimé, comédie latine du Xe siècle (Paris, 1874)
- Jacobus Ulrich, ed., Pamphilus, Codici Turicensi (Zurich, 1983)
- Gustave Cohen, La "Comédie" latine en France au 12e siècle, 2 vols (Paris, 1931)
- Adolfo Bonilla and San Martín, Una comedia latina del siglo XII: (el "Liber Panphili"); reproducción de un manuscrito inédito y versión castellana, Boletín de la Real Academia de la Historia, 70: Cuaderno, V (Madrid: Imp. de Fortanet, 1917)
- Thomas Jay Garbáty, "Pamphilus, de Amore: An Introduction and Translation", The Chaucer Review, 2 (1967), pp. 108–134, English translation
