= Sancho Garcés =

Sancho Garcés may refer to:

- Sancho Garcés, legendary king of Sobrarbe (815–832)
- Sancho Garcés I of Pamplona (r. 905–925)
- Sancho Garcés II of Pamplona (r. 970–994)
- Sancho Garcés III of Pamplona (r. 1004–1035)
- Sancho Garcés IV of Pamplona (r. 1054–1076)
- Sancho Garcés, Lord of Uncastillo (d. 1083)
