= Codina (surname) =

Codina is a Catalan surname and refers to barren rock. Notable people with the surname include:

- Aaron Codina (born 1999), Chilean handball player
- Antoni Ferrer y Codina (1837–1905), Spanish playwright and journalist
- Antonio Codina (born 1943), Spanish swimmer
- Enrique Fontana Codina (1921–1989), Spanish politician
- Francisco Codina (born 1949), Spanish field hockey player
- Isidre Codina, Spanish football manager
- Jesús Codina (1938–1999), Spanish basketball player
- Jordi Codina Rodríguez (born 1982), Spanish football player
- Josep Anton Codina Olivé (1932–2021), Spanish theater director
- Josep Dallerès Codina (born 1949), Andorran politician
- Josep Feliu i Codina (1845–1897), Catalan journalist, novelist and playwright
- Laia Codina (born 2000), Spanish football player
- Lluis Codina (born 1973), Spanish football player
- Oriol Martorell i Codina (1927–1996), Spanish musical director, pedagogue and professor of history
