= Pablo Hurus =

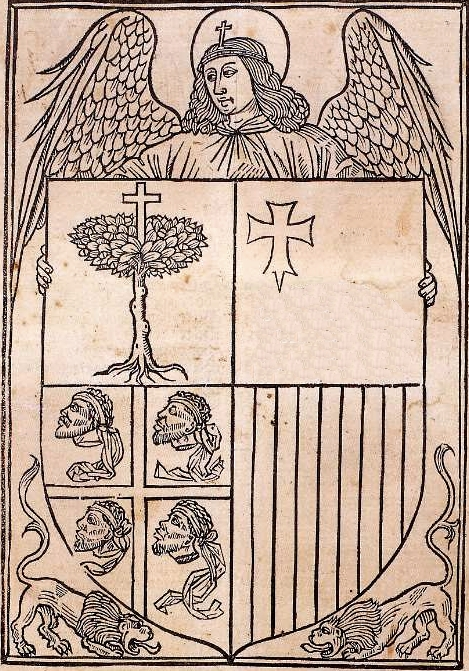
The coat of arms of Aragon in Fabricio Vagad's Crónica de Aragón, printed by Hurus in 1499.

Pablo Hurus (also Paul Hurus, Paul Hyrus, Paul Huros, Paulus de Constantia, born in Constance; died after 1505) was a German printer of the late 15th-century, active in Zaragoza, Aragon during the years 1484 to 1499. With his brother Juan, he established one of the important early printing shops of the Iberian peninsula, predated only by the Sevilla printing shops of Menrad Ungut and Estanislao Polono.

In 1484, he printed the Evangelios e epístolas by the Zaragozan humanist Gonzalo García de Santamaría, which included the first printed Bible translation into Spanish. No specimen of this work has survived, as it was ordered to be destroyed by the Spanish Inquisition after the ban on Bible translations issued in 1559 (the work does however survive in the reprint by Ambrosio Montesino, Toledo, 1512).

Between 1488 and 1491, Pablo Hurus returned to his native Germany, and the printing shop was under the direction of his brother Juan. This period saw the edition of Aesop's Fables (1489). and possibly the History of the Seven Sages of Rome.

Among Hurus' notable works are the Missale caesaraugustano (1484), the Exemplario contra los engaños y peligros del mundo by Juan de Capua (1493) and Boccaccio's De mulieribus claris (1494). In 1497, he printed the Aragonese fueros (compilation of laws), edited by Gonzalo García de Santamaría, and the letters of Seneca, edited by Fernán Pérez de Guzmán.

His masterpiece may be Bernhard of Breidenbach's Peregrinatio in terram sanctam of 1498, using three different blackletter types and more than seventy woodcut illustrations, decorative capital initials and eight great fold-out pages, one of them extending to the width of nine folia.

In 1499, he printed the first history of Aragon, Crónica de Aragón by Gualberto Fabricio Vagad, with the first known representation of the coat of arms of Aragon on the title page.
