= Juan Ximénez Cerdán =

Juan Ximénez (or Jiménez) Cerdán (c. 1355 – aft. 1435) was a fiscal and constitutional lawyer and legal theorist who served as the Justicia Mayor of the Kingdom of Aragon from 1390 until 1423. He was a son of Domingo Ximénez Cerdán, also a Justicia, and María Sanz de Aliaga. He married María Pérez del Sou. In his capacity as Justicia he presided over the important Cortes of 1398 (during the succession dispute between Martin I of Sicily and Matthew of Foix) and 1412 (in the leadup to the Compromise of Caspe, in which he supported Ferdinand of Antequera). When he was eighty years old, at the request of Martín Díez de Aux, Juan wrote a Carta or Letra intimada ("intimate letter") detailing the history of the office of the Justiciazgo. It was later published in the final edition of the Fueros y observancias de Aragón (1624) and was an important source for the legend of the Laws of Sobrarbe. Here is his description of how the office of Justicia arose:

Certain peoples conquered from the Moors a certain part of the kingdom in the mountains of Sobrarbe, and since these were communities with neither governor nor alderman, and given that there were many disputes and debates among them, it was determined that, to avoid such problems and so that they might live in peace, they should elect a king to reign over them ... but that there should be a Judge between them and the king, who would hold the title of Justicia of Aragon. It is held by some that the Justicia was elected before the king, and that the king was elected under such conditions. Since then there has always been a Justicia of Aragon in the kingdom, cognisant of all procedures regarding the king, as much in petitioning as in defence.

== Sources ==
- Ximénez Cerdán, Juan (2000) at the Gran Enciclopedia Aragonesa
- Juan Jiménez Cerdán (2004) at Biografías y vidas
