= Gualberto Fabricio de Vagad =

Frontispiece of the Crónica de Aragón (1499) showing the earliest illustration of the Aragonese coat-of-arms.

Gualberto Fabricio de Vagad was an Aragonese Cistercian Benedictine monk and the first historian of the Kingdom of Aragon. He was born in Zaragoza in the first third of the fifteenth century and straddles the line between the Late Middle Ages and the Renaissance. He lived most of his life at the monastery of Santa María de Santa Fe, though he also spent some time at San Juan de la Peña. According to Félix de Latassa y Ortín, besides history he wrote various treatises on poetry and a compendium of verse.

Vagad's magnum opus, the Crónica de Aragón, a vernacular Romance history of Aragon from the mythical Kingdom of Sobrarbe (founded 724) up to the death of Alfonso V (1458), was published in Zaragoza in 1499; its incunabula survive. It was commissioned by the deputies of Ferdinand II of Aragon, who named Vagad cronista mayor (senior chronicler), though the office of cronista was not formally instituted until the Cortes of Monzón in 1547.

For the work Vagad consulted the archives of San Juan de la Peña, San Victorián, Poblet, Montearagón, and Barcelona among other archives of the Crown of Aragon. In international matters he was a Spanish partisan and this bias enters into his history: he considered the Emperor Maximilian I a Spaniard and made the legendary Count Julian an Italian. In peninsular matters his Aragonese bias is evident, as when he devalues the conquest of Valencia by the Castilian folk hero El Cid (1094) relative to the conquest of the same city by James I of Aragon (1236). The work contains three prologues. In the first Vagad heaps praise on Spain in the tradition of Isidore's Laus Spaniae; in the second he argues from history for the preeminence of Aragon amongst the kingdoms of the Iberian peninsula; and in the third he defends the importance of Zaragoza as the chief city of Spain. Preoccupied with style, his narrative is frequently interrupted by lengthy and banal arguments. Eduard Fueter, the Swiss historian of universal historiography, writes that Vagad's Crónica contains the "timid critical germs of the medieval tradition" (tímidos gérmenes de crítica de la tradición medieval).

== Sources ==
- Gualberto Fabricio de Vagad at the Gran Enciclopedia Aragonesa
