= Felix de Latassa =

Aragonese bibliographer (1733–1805)

Felix de Latassa y Ortin (November 21, 1733 – April 2, 1805) was Aragonese bibliographer responsible for compiling (in several works) a chronological index of Aragonese writers from the time of the birth of Christ up to his own time.

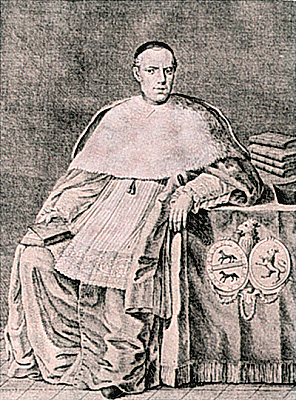
Portrait of Felix Latassa (anonymous, eighteenth century)

The bibliographies are often treated in two parts:

- The first, in two large volumes, catalogues Aragonese literature and letters ranging from the years 1 to 1500.
- The second part, separate volumes that cover from 1500 to his own contemporary age (1802).

Latassa's bibliographies also contain many biographical notes which are a valuable (and sometimes sole) source for many Aragonese historical figures.

== Biography ==
Latassa was born (and died) in Zaragoza of an Aragonese noble family which had fallen onto hard times. His parents, Juan Latassa y Ortiz (of Navarre) and Maria Ortin moved to Zaragoza after their marriage in the early eighteenth century. Latassa began studying Arts and Philosophy at the University of Zaragoza in 1749 and gained his bachelor's degree in 1752. It is also around this time that Latassa took holy orders to become a priest. Despite his pastoral duties, he continued his studies and was awarded a degree in Theology in 1761 with a doctorate in 1762.
During his life Latassa was employed as a curate at the parish of Juslibol and later as a racionero in the metropolitan church of El Salvador (1780) and later to a sinecure at the Basilica del Pilar in 1782. He died aged 67 considering his life's work as incomplete, and was interred in the Basilica del Pilar, in the chapel of Saint Vincent.

== Works ==
His bibliographies by publication date:

- Bibliotheca Antigua de los escritores aragoneses que florecieron desde la venida de Christo hasta el año 1500 (Note: "Ancient Bibliography of Aragonese writers who bloomed since the coming of Christ until the year 1500" - Two volumes, published 1796))
- Biblioteca nueva de los escritores aragoneses que florecieron desde el año de 1500 hasta 1599 (Note: "New Bibliography of Aragonese writers who bloomed from the year 1500-1599" - published 1798))
- Biblioteca nueva de los escritores aragones que florecieron desde el año de 1600 hasta 1640 (Note: "New Bibliography of Aragonese writers who bloomed from the year 1600-1640" - published 1799))
- Biblioteca nueva de los escritores aragoneses que florecieron desde el año de 1641 hastaa 1680 (Note: "New Bibliography of Aragonese writers who bloomed from the year 1641-1680" - published 1799))
- Biblioteca nueva de los escritores aragoneses que florecieron desde el año de 1689 hasta el de 1753 (Note: "New Bibliography of Aragonese writers who bloomed from the year 1689-1753" - published 1800))
- Biblioteca nueva de los escritores aragoneses que florecieron desde el año de 1753 hasta el de 1795 (Note: "New Bibliography of Aragonese writers who bloomed from the year 1753-1795" - published 1801))

In addition to his bibliographies:

- Memorias de los Racioneros de Mensa de la Santa Iglesia Metropolitana del Salvador (Note: Memoirs of racioneros of Mensa of the Metropolitan Holy Church of Salvador - published 1798)

== Bibliography ==
FATÁS, G. (coord.) Aragoneses Ilustres. (Zaragoza, Caja de Ahorros de la Inmaculada, 1983).
LAMARCA LANGA, G. "Félix Latassa. Apuntes biográficos". (Revista de Historia Jerónimo Zurita, 72 [1997], pp. 185–193).
