= Huguet de Mataplana =

Catalan nobleman and poet

Huguet de Mataplana (after 1173 – 28 November 1213) was a Catalan nobleman and poet. His name, also spelled Uget, is the diminutive form of Hug (also spelled Huc or Uc), which is the Occitan version of "Hugh" (French Hugues).

Huguet was the nephew of Ponç de Mataplana, who was attacked in a poem by the troubadour Guillem de Berguedà and whose death was later lamented by that same troubadour in a planh. Huguet's name appears in documents regularly between 1185 and his death. In 1197, for the first time in a surviving document, a woman, Sança, is named as his wife. He derives his name from the lordship he held at Mataplana near Nostra Senyora de Montgrony in the Ripollès. He was a frequent attendee at the courts of Alfonso II of Aragon and his son Peter II, figuring extensively in their royal charters. He was said to be a favorite of Peter.

According to the Histories e conquestes dels Reys de Arago e Comtes de Barcelona of Pere Tomich (1438), a late source, Huguet was present at the Battle of Las Navas de Tolosa in 1212. He was wounded at the Battle of Muret the next year and died of his wounds a few months later. Peter II died at this battle. According to the Llibre dels fets of Peter's son, James I, Huguet was one of those who fled the field at Muret.

Huguet was the patron of the troubadour Raimon Vidal de Bezaudun. According to "Abrils issia", by Raimon, Huguet was an intimate and patron of joglars, the travelling performers of troubadours' songs. In another poem, "So fo el temps", Raimon describes in detail Huguet's sumptuous court at Mataplana. It has been suggested that Raimon was Huguet's teacher and grammarian. Of Huguet's poetic output, three tensos and one sirventes are conserved. He composed "En Blanchacet, eu sui de noit" and "En Diable, vos es per dar enoi", his two tensos with a Blacatz (or possibly with Blacasset), while the two were both young. His patronage of joglars did not stop him from attacking one Reculaire in the sirventes "Scometre.us vuoill, Reculaire". Huguet's most studied work is "D'un sirventes m'es pres talens", in which he abuses his good friend Raimon de Miraval for disowning his wife, Caudairenga. The sirventes comes with a long razo explaining the circumstances of its composition. Raimon has left a response.

== Works ==
- Works with Catalan translation

== Sources ==
- Riquer, Martín de. Los trovadores: historia literaria y textos. 3 vol. Barcelona: Planeta, 1975.
