= Santa Fe Abbey =

Monastery in Zaragoza, Spain

Coordinates: 41°40′58″N 0°09′00″E

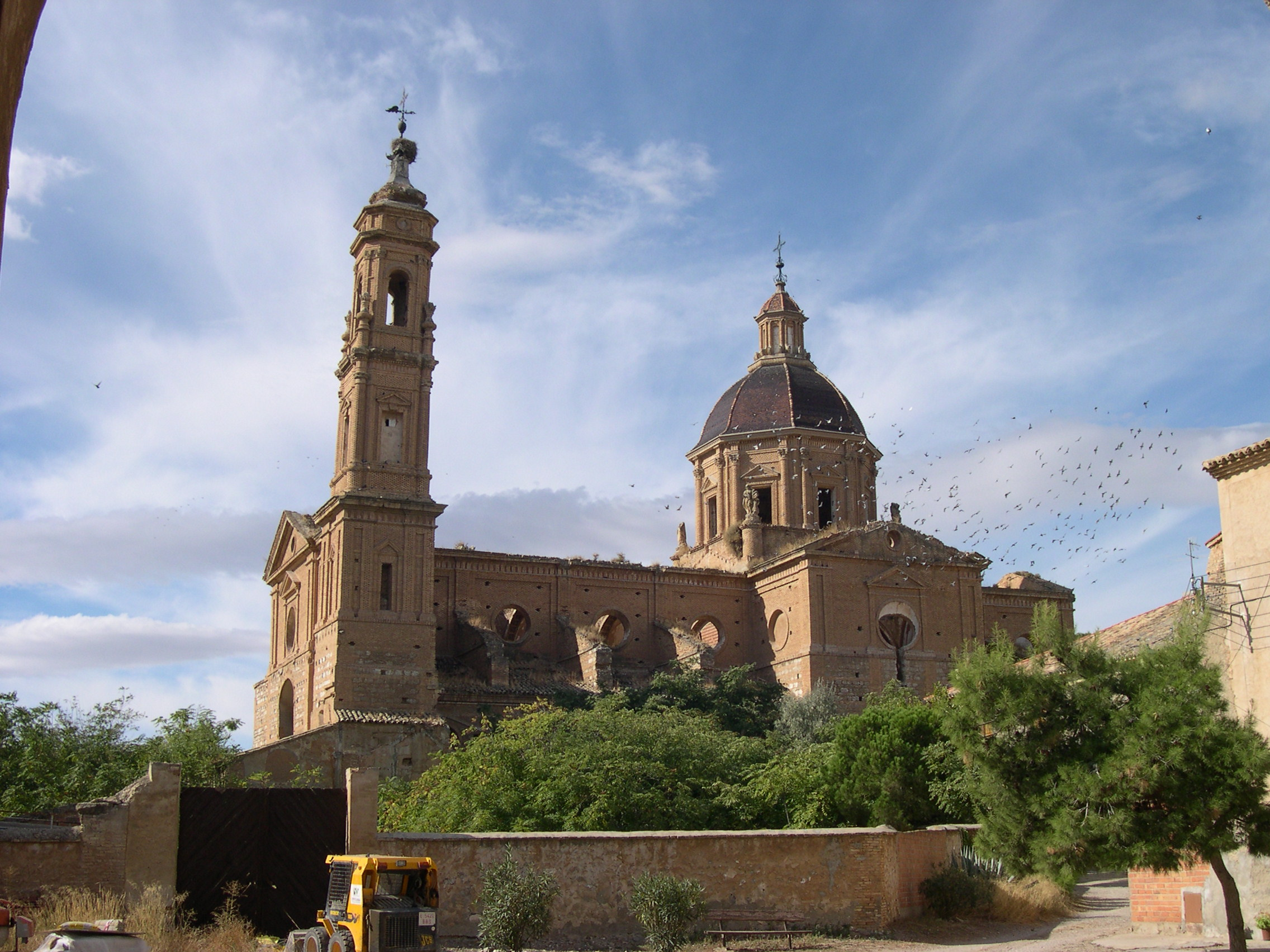
Santa Fe Abbey

Santa Fe Abbey (Spanish: Monasterio de Santa Fe) is a former Cistercian monastery in Zaragoza, Aragon, Spain. It was established on this site in 1341 or 1343, as a resettlement of the original Cistercian foundation of Fuente Clara Abbey, a daughter house of Abbaye de Bonnefont, of 1223, which was obliged to move here from its original site in Albalate de Cinca in Aragon because of banditry.

The monastery was dissolved either in 1808 or in 1835–37. There are no visible remains of the monastic buildings. The large domed church still on the site was built in the late 18th century (completed 1788).
