= Gonzalo García de Santa María =

Spanish historian and jurist

Gonzalo García de Santa María (born 31 May 1447 in Zaragoza, died 1521) was a Spanish jurist, historian and writer.
