= Juslibol =

Coordinates: 41°42′N 0°54′W

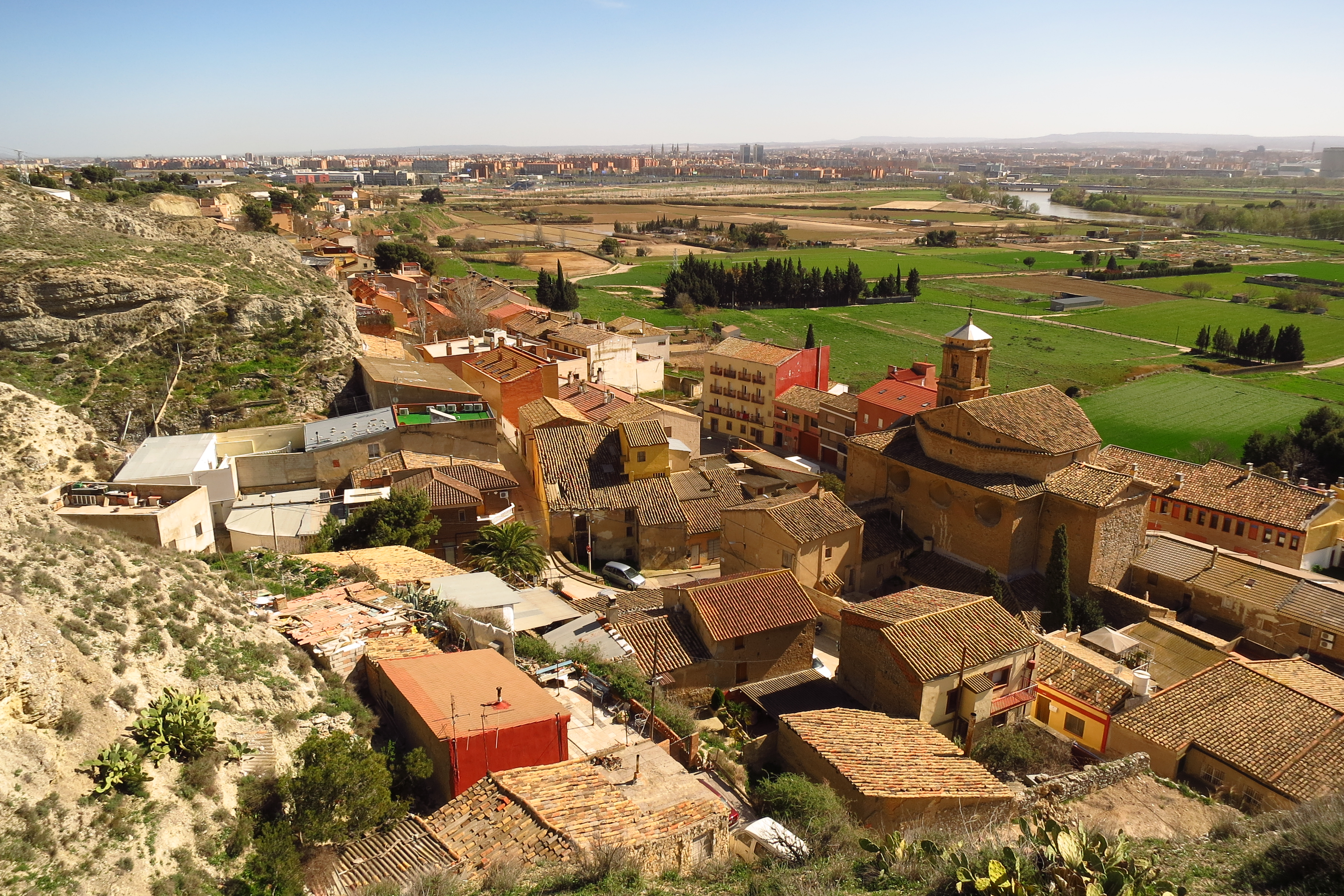
View of the old village from the castle

Juslibol is a rural district of the city of Zaragoza, Spain. As of 2013, it has a population of 1518 inhabitants.

== Main sights ==
- Castle of Juslibol
- Castle of Miranda
- Galacho de Juslibol
