= Declaration of the Initiation of the Process of Independence of Catalonia =

"L'Estelada Blava" (The Blue Starred Flag), the blue version of the pro-independence flag

"L'Estelada Vermella" (The Red Starred Flag), the red version of the pro-independence flag

After pro-independence parties won a majority of seats in the Catalan election on 27 September 2015, the Declaration of the Initiation of the Process of Independence of Catalonia (Catalan: Declaració d'inici del procés d'independència de Catalunya) was issued on 9 November 2015. The declaration declares the start of the process to create an independent Catalan state in the form of a republic and proclaims the start of a participative, open, integrating and active citizens' constituent process to lay the foundation for the future Catalan Constitution.

The declaration was passed with 72 votes in favor, 63 against and 0 abstentions in the Parliament of Catalonia.

On 9 June 2017, the Catalan government announced the date of the independence referendum. It was declared illegal on 6 September 2017 and suspended by the Constitutional Court of Spain because it breached the Spanish Constitution of 1978. It was held on 1 October the same year, using a disputed voting process, resulting in a 90% majority of votes favouring independence with a turnout of 42.58%. Subsequently, the European Commission agreed that the referendum was illegal.

== See also ==
- Catalan independence
- 2014 Catalan self-determination referendum
- 2015 Catalan regional election
- Catalan Declaration of Sovereignty
- History of Catalonia
- Ibarretxe Plan
