= De Aragoniae Regibus et eorum rebus gestis libri V =

1509 chronicle

De Aragoniae Regibus et eorum rebus gestis libri V (English: The Kings of Aragon and their works, in 5 volumes) is a chronicle written in Zaragoza in 1509 by Lucio Marineo Siculo documenting the feats of the kings of the Aragonese Renaissance. The chronicle was written in Latin and was later translated into Spanish by Juan de Molina. The Spanish edition was published in Valencia in 1524 under the title Crónica d'Aragón (Chronicle of Aragon).
