= Pere Antoni Beuter =

Exegate to Valencian historian

Pere Antoni Beuter (1490–1554) was a Spanish historian and writer who spent most of his life in Valencia.

Originally from Germany, he studied humanities at the University of Valencia. He was secretary to Archbishop Erhard of Marche. In 1540 he was sent to Rome where he was appointed apostolic preacher by Pope Paul III. After returning to Valencia, he was rector and professor of Old Testament Scripture.

His major works were historiographical, among which its first part of the history of Valencia in 1538 that addresses the issue of the founding of Valencia. The work was successful so he drafted a new version in Spanish in 1546. The second part of the work was written entirely in Spanish and published in 1550 under the name Second part of the general chronicle of Spain. The third part is still unpublished and has not been found.
