= Antoni Ferrer y Codina =

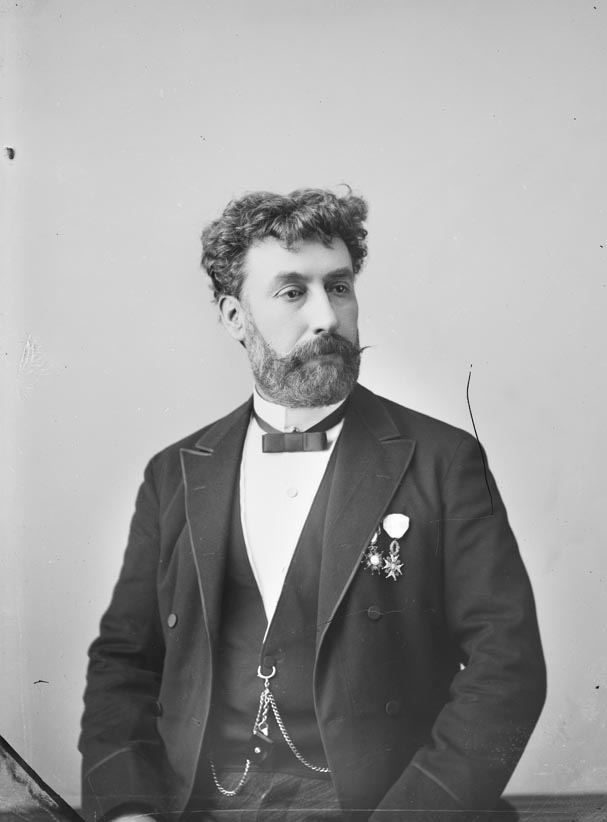
- Born: 1837
- Died: 11 October 1905
- Occupations: writer, playwright

Anton Ferrer y Codina (Note: He was published under the names «A. Ferrer y Codina», «Anton Ferrer y Codina» and «Antonio Ferrer y Codina». Contemporary style would refer to him as «Antoni Ferrer i Codina».) (Barcelona, 1837 - October 11, 1905) was a Spanish playwright and newspaper writer.

== Biography ==
Born in Barcelona in 1837, he was editor of the Barcelona Alegre and La Tomasa weeklies. He died on October 11, 1905.

== Major works ==
- 1867. Les relíquies d'una mare, premiered at the Teatro Romea, on 20 January 1867.
- 1867. Un gefe de la coronela patriotic drama in three acts, premiered at the Teatro Romea, on 19 December 1867.
- 1868. La perla de Badalona, premiered at the Teatro Romea, on 4 January 1868.
- 1868. Ocells d'Amèrica, premiered at the Teatro Romea, on 3 February 1868.
- 1868. El gat de mar, premiered at the Teatro Romea, on 21 November 1868.
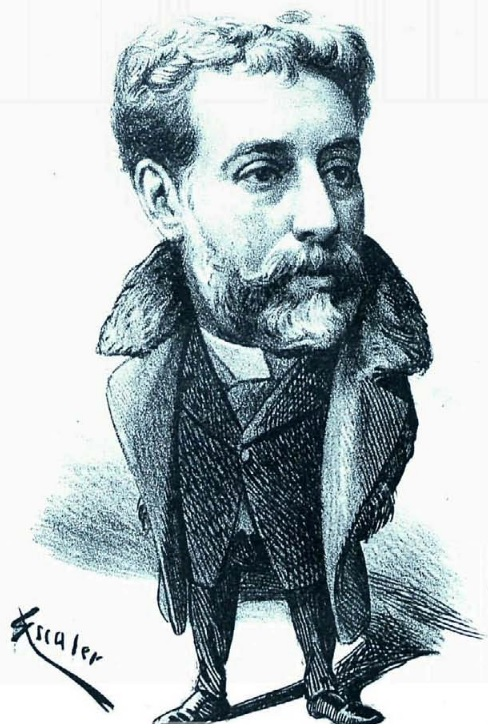
- 1902. Els calaveres, comedy in three acts, originally by A. Hennequin and E. de Najac, and adapted by Ferrer and Codina; premiered at the Teatro Romea.
