= El Nacional (Catalonia) =

- Type: Online newspaper
- Owner: Grup Les Notícies de Catalunya
- Founder: José Antich i Valero
- Founded: March 2016
- Political alignment: Catalanism, Independentism
- Language: Catalan and Spanish
- Headquarters: Carrer Numància, 46 4a A Barcelona
- Price: Free
- Sister newspapers: El Caso, En Blau and On Economia
- Website: https://www.elnacional.cat

El Nacional is a digital newspaper based in Barcelona, launched in March 2016. Its editorial line is pro-independence and generally supportive of Catalanism and the advancement of Catalonia's self-government.

It was promoted and founded by José Antich, who is its publisher and editor-in-chief, after being dismissed as director of La Vanguardia. The design of the newspaper was developed by Mark Porter and Pablo Martín.

The newspaper primarily covers political, economic, social, cultural, and sports news, with special attention to developments in Catalonia. It is published in Catalan and Spanish, with some articles also available in English. The publishing company is Grup les Notícies de Catalunya.

It has editions devoted exclusively to celebrity and entertainment news (En Blau), from the very beginning; to leisure and culture (Revers, created in January 2021, previously La Llança, created in May 2017); a crime and events section (El Caso), launched in March 2019; and a gastronomy section created in October 2022 (La Gourmeteria).In addition, José Antich also launched the economic digital newspaper ON Economia in November 2022.

Among its regular contributors are columnists such as Jordi Barbeta, Pilar Rahola, Bernat Dedéu, Enric Vila, Agustí Colomines, Joan Queralt, Montserrat Nebrera, Elisa Beni, Montserrat Dameson, Pilar Velasco, Cristina Sánchez Miret, and Marçal Sintes, among others.

== En Blau ==
En Blau is the celebrity gossip section of the digital newspaper El Nacional, directed by José Antich i Valero. The editorial team is coordinated by journalist Marc Villanueva, and includes Darío Porras. Its main focus is on celebrities, television, and the Spanish Royal Family.
