= Pere Tomich =

Catalan knight and historian

Title page of the 1534 printing of his Histories

Pere (or Père) Tomich or Tomic (Bagà, Barcelona, fl. 1431–1438) was a Catalan knight and historian. He was son of the mayor of Bagà and attorney for the baronies of Pinós and Mataplana. He was Castilian of the castle of Aristot (Alt Urgell) in the years 1446-47.

He wrote a monumental general history of Catalonia from Creation, through the "primers pobladors d'Espanya" (first populators of Spain), to the reign of Ferdinand I of Aragon. His Histories e Conquestes del reyalme Darago e principat de Cathalunya he finished at Bagà in 1438. One of its distinguishing marks is Pere's uncritical acceptance of legend and incorporation of folklore into his otherwise accurate account. Besides legend, Pere especially revels in listing the names of the major noble families of Aragon, Catalonia, and Valencia. The events (especially military, with a taste for naval expeditions) in which they were actors accompany their names, and the names of the lords of Pinós and Bagà are heavily favoured. Pere is the sole source for several historical events. He adds to the so-called "Legend of the Cowardly Peasants", in which the cowardice of the peasantry in the face of the Moors is led to explain their servitude, the fact that the Christian leader whose summons to arms they refused to obey was Louis the Pious and that the summons took place in 814. Pere also asserts that Huguet de Mataplana, the troubadour, was present at the Battle of Las Navas de Tolosa. He provides a detailed explanation of how Raymond Berengar I and Almodis codified the Catalan system of rank in their Usatges. Pere also wrote that Martin of Aragon died of the plague, which has been disproved.

In 1431, a lawyer representing the guild of bitmakers of Barcelona arrived in Bagà to obtain a copy of a document authenticating a miracle supposedly performed by Saint Stephen on Galceran de Pinós. Finding the rector of the city away on business, the lawyer obtained the testimony of the oldest and most trustworthy men of Bagà in a public information-gathering session held in front of a notary public. The first sworn testimony recorded was that of Pere Tomich. His recollection is detailed and he adds the story of one hundred young ladies who were rescued through the saint's intervention. All subsequent witnesses simply affirmed Pere's testimony, adding that so had they heard from their fathers and grandfathers.
