= Lucio Marineo Siculo =

Spanish historian

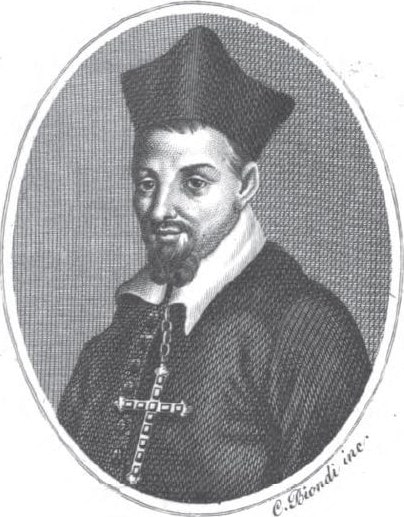
- Born: 1444 or 1445; Vizzini, Kingdom of Sicily
- Died: 1533 (aged 88–89); Kingdom of Spain
- Occupations: humanist, historian

Lucio Marineo Siculo (Vizzini, 1444 or 1445 – Spain, 1533) was a Sicilian humanist, historian and poet, known as a prominent figure of the Spanish Renaissance.

He first taught Greek and Latin literature in Palermo. He moved to Spain and taught for twelve years at the University of Salamanca. His teaching and books influenced the development of the Spanish Renaissance, and his disciples included Alfono de Segura. King Ferdinand brought him to the royal court to serve as chaplain and chronicler. He was also charged with the education of the children of the nobility.

== Works ==
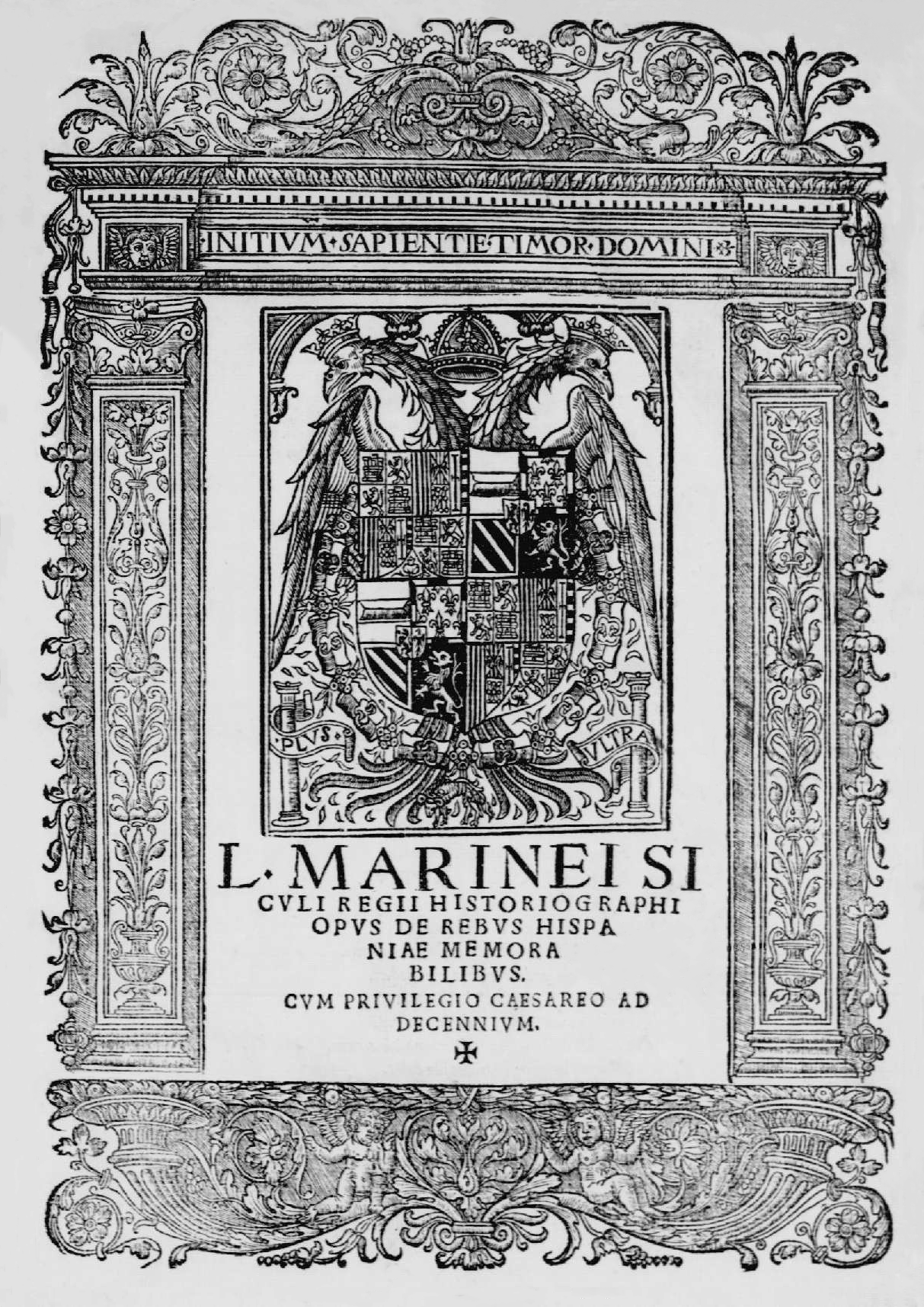
De rebus Hispaniae memorabilibus (Alcalá de Henares: Miguel de Eguía; 1530.)

- De laudibus Hispaniae Libri VII (Burgos, 1496)
- De rebus Hispaniae memorabilibus Libri XXV (Alcalá, 1530)
- De Aragoniae Regibus et eorum rebus gestis libri V (Zaragoza, 1509)
- Epistolarum familiarum libri XVII
