= Palace of the Diputación del General del Reino de Aragón =

Palace in Zaragoza, Spain

Palace of the Deputation of the Kingdom of Aragon
- Palacio de la Diputación del General del Reino de Aragón
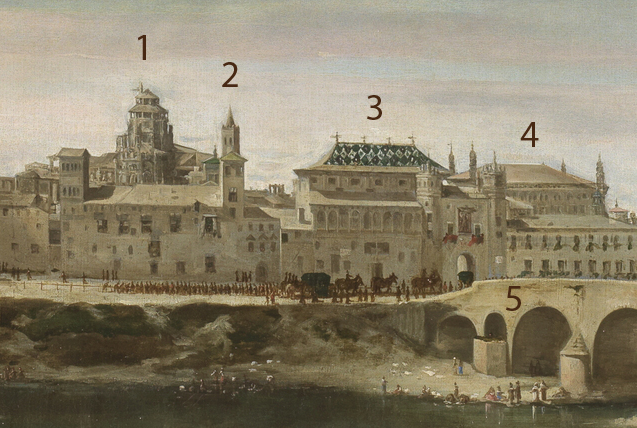
- Detail of the painting in 1647 by J.B. Martínez del Mazo, sometimes attributed to his master, Velázquez. The landmarks represented correspond to: 1.- Lantern Tower of the Seo; 2.- Mudejar Tower of the Seo; 3.- Palace of the Diputación del General del Reino de Aragón; 4.- Llotja 5.- Puente de Piedra
- Interactive map of the Palace of the Deputation of the Kingdom of Aragon area

General information
- Location: Zaragoza, Spain
- Coordinates: 41.655733°N 0.875931°W
- Groundbreaking: 1450
- Construction started: 1437
- Landlord: Diputación del General del Reino de Aragón, Cortes del Reino de Aragón and Justicia de Aragón

The Palace of the Diputación del General del Reino de Aragón, (Note: English: Palace of the Deputation General of the Kingdom of Aragon) historically known as Casas del Reino (Note: English: Houses of the Kingdom.) (Medieval Aragonese: Casas del Reyno) or Casa de la Diputación del Reino, (Note: English: House of the Deputation of the Kingdom) was a building in the Plaza de la Seo in Zaragoza in 1436, as the headquarters of the Diputación del General del Reino de Aragón, the Cortes and the Justicia de Aragon.

The palace was a Gothic building located in Zaragoza next to the Puerta del Ángel, the Puente de Piedra, the Casas del Puente (headquarters of the municipal council) and the Llotja. It was one of the most important buildings in Zaragoza for its symbolism, political and artistic importance.

Its equivalent palaces in the rest of the Deputations of the General of the Crown of Aragon are the Palau de la Generalitat de Cataluña and the Palau de la Generalitat de Valencia, both of which are current seats of the governments of both autonomous communities.

The palace was burned during the Siege of Zaragoza and after the end of the war it remained in ruins until it was demolished to build the Conciliar Seminary.

It should not be confused with the Casa de los Diputados del Reino de Aragón, which is a Renaissance palace also disappeared and located in Zaragoza, acquired in 1590 by the Diputación to serve as lodging for those elected deputies not residing in Zaragoza, since they were obliged to reside in the capital.

== Description ==
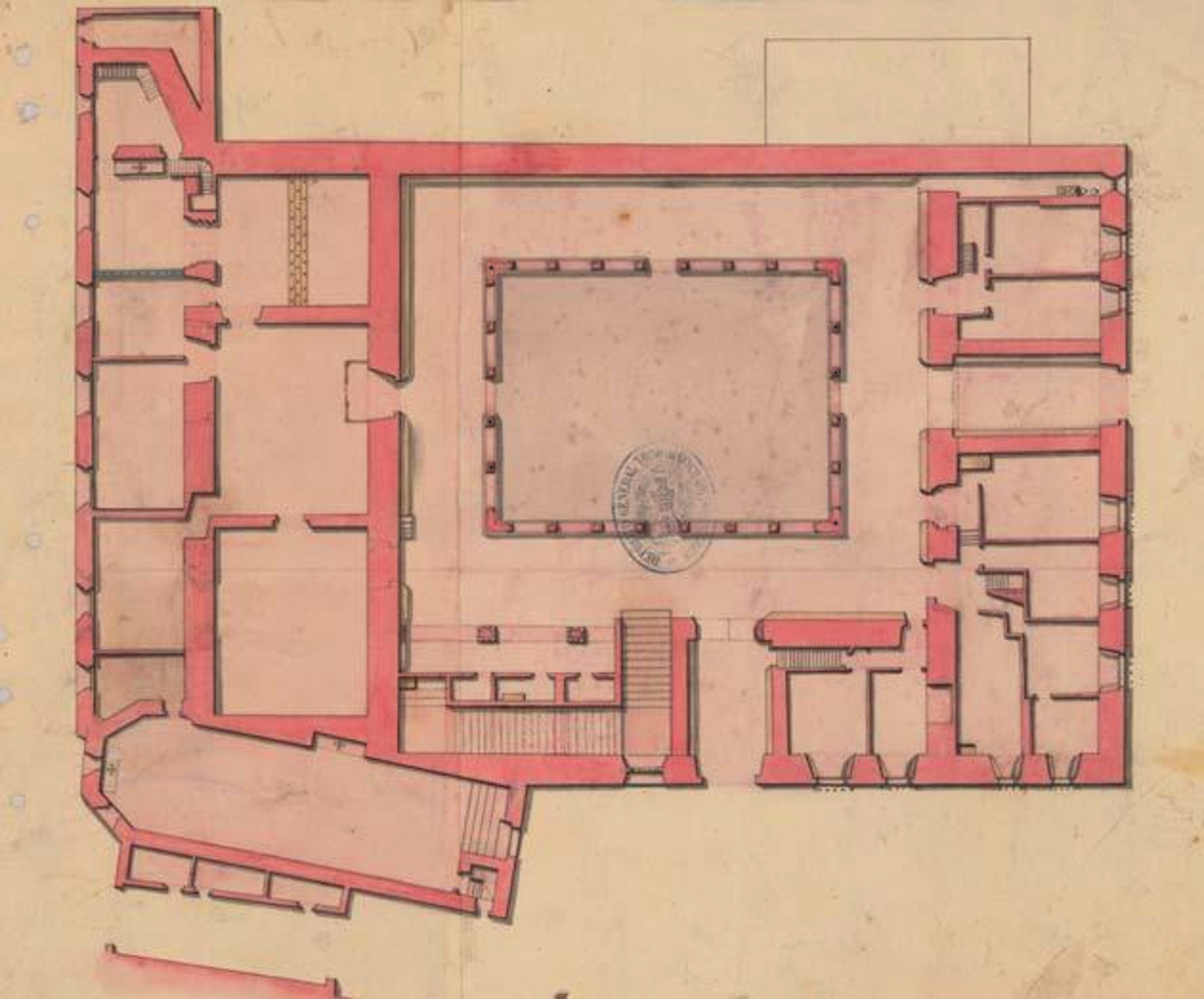
Plan of the palace in 1756. General Military Archive of Madrid

The building consisted of three floors organized around a large inner courtyard or moon. The floor was paved with river stones forming patterns.

It had three facades: one facing the Plaza de la Catedral, another facing the Casas del Puente and the last and best known, facing the Paseo del Ebro.

It had two entrances: one from Cuchillería Street (currently Don Jaime Street) and the other from the Plaza de la Diputación (currently Plaza de la Seo).

=== First Floor ===
On the second floor there was a chapel with a 1502 altarpiece by Gil Morlanes carved in alabaster and separated into three parts: in the center, the "Coronation of the Virgin", and on the sides stories of St. George and St. Engratia, local saints. On the walls there were paintings by Pablo Ravilla.

=== Second floor ===
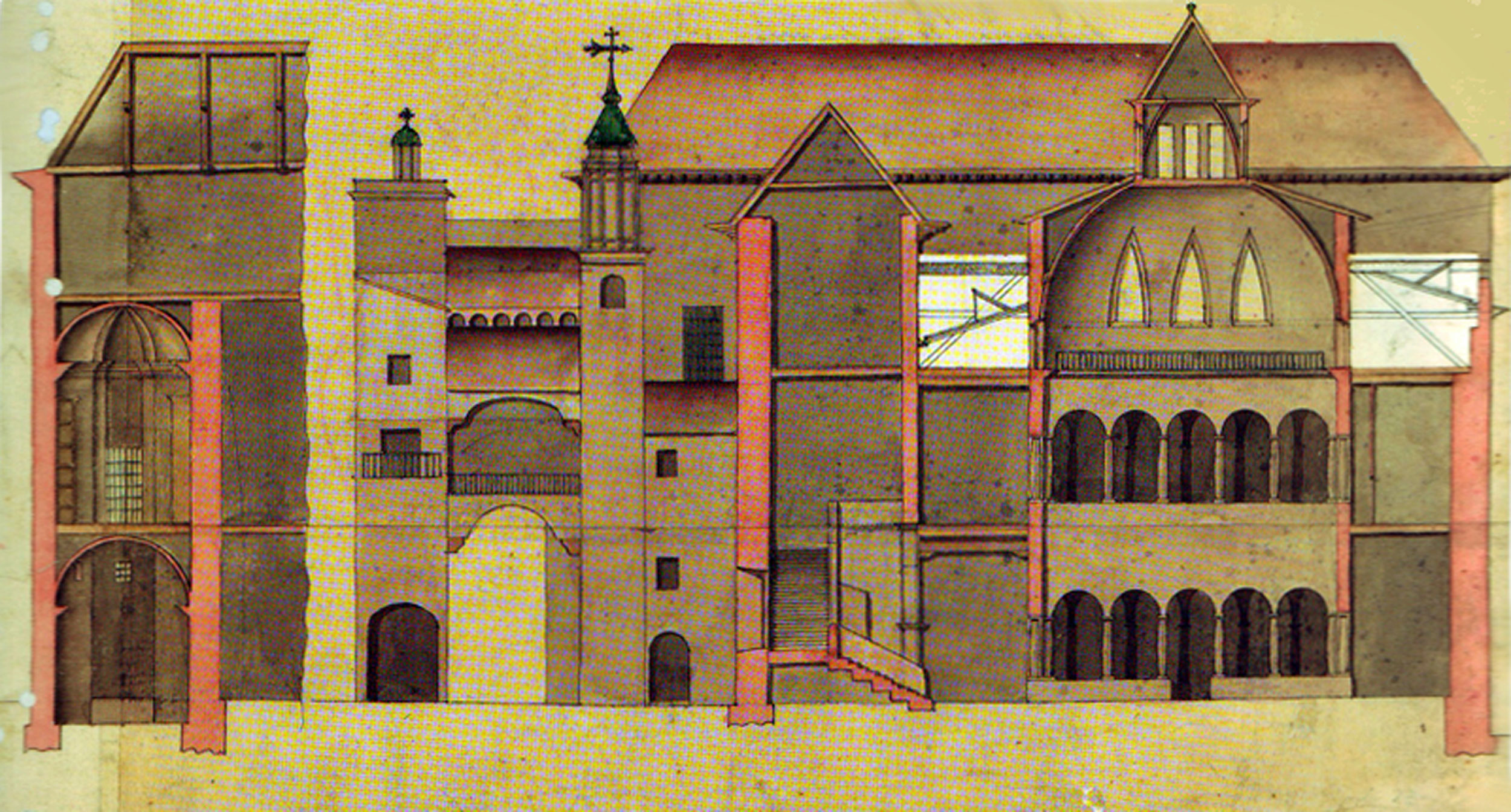
Profile in 1756. General Military Archives of Madrid.

On the second floor was the so-called Hall of St. George, the Hall of Cortes or Hall of the Kingdom, which measured 292 palms in length, 52 in width and 56 in height. The Cortes and other solemn acts were held there. It had six windows, two to the east and four to the north. At the back of the hall, on the wall of the east side, the alabaster image of St. George and the dragon, which was the work of the Pamplona sculptor Miguel de Ancheta, was placed as an altar. On the walls hung pictures of all the kings of Aragon, painted by Filippo Ariosto with their respective Latin inscriptions by Jerónimo de Blancas. The ceiling was decorated in mudéjar style, gilded and adorned with figures of griffins, lions, centaurs and mythological animals. The Court of Justice met in an adjoining room adorned with portraits of the Justicia de Aragón painted by Rolan de Moys.

=== Third floor ===
It served as an archive and armory and was decorated with a roof of German tiles forming black and white lozenges. The small Church of St. John was also part of the complex and was used as a royal chapel.

== History ==
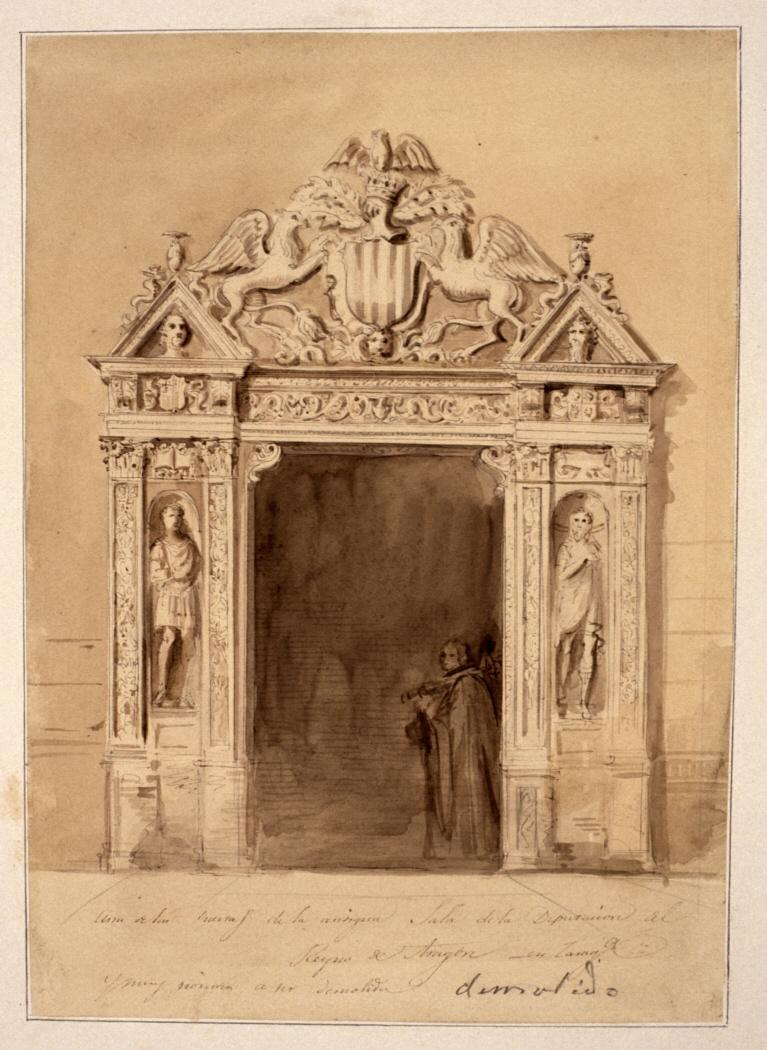
Portico of the Diputación Palace before being demolished. Drawing by Valentín Carderera. Lázaro Galdiano Museum.

In the Cortes of Aragon held in 1427 it was decided to build a permanent headquarters for the Diputación del General del Reino de Aragón. The building was constructed under the economic direction of Ramón de Mur and the works lasted between 1437 and 1450. The main masters responsible for the work were: Johan de Laredo, master of the stonework, Moris Perrin, master of the carpentry work and designer of the roof, and Mahoma Rafacon. They were subordinated masters by Bernart Arnault, Bernart Soler and Ibrahim de Ceuta.

In 1559 the viewpoint on the side of the Ebro River was built under the direction of Juan de Gali and Jaime Crosian. In 1670 a roof covering the inner courtyard was built.

In 1707 the Kingdom of Aragon and all its institutions were abolished as a result of the Nueva Planta Decrees of Philip V. The Royal Audience of Aragon took over the building and renamed it "Casas de la Audiencia" (Note: English: Houses of the Audience).

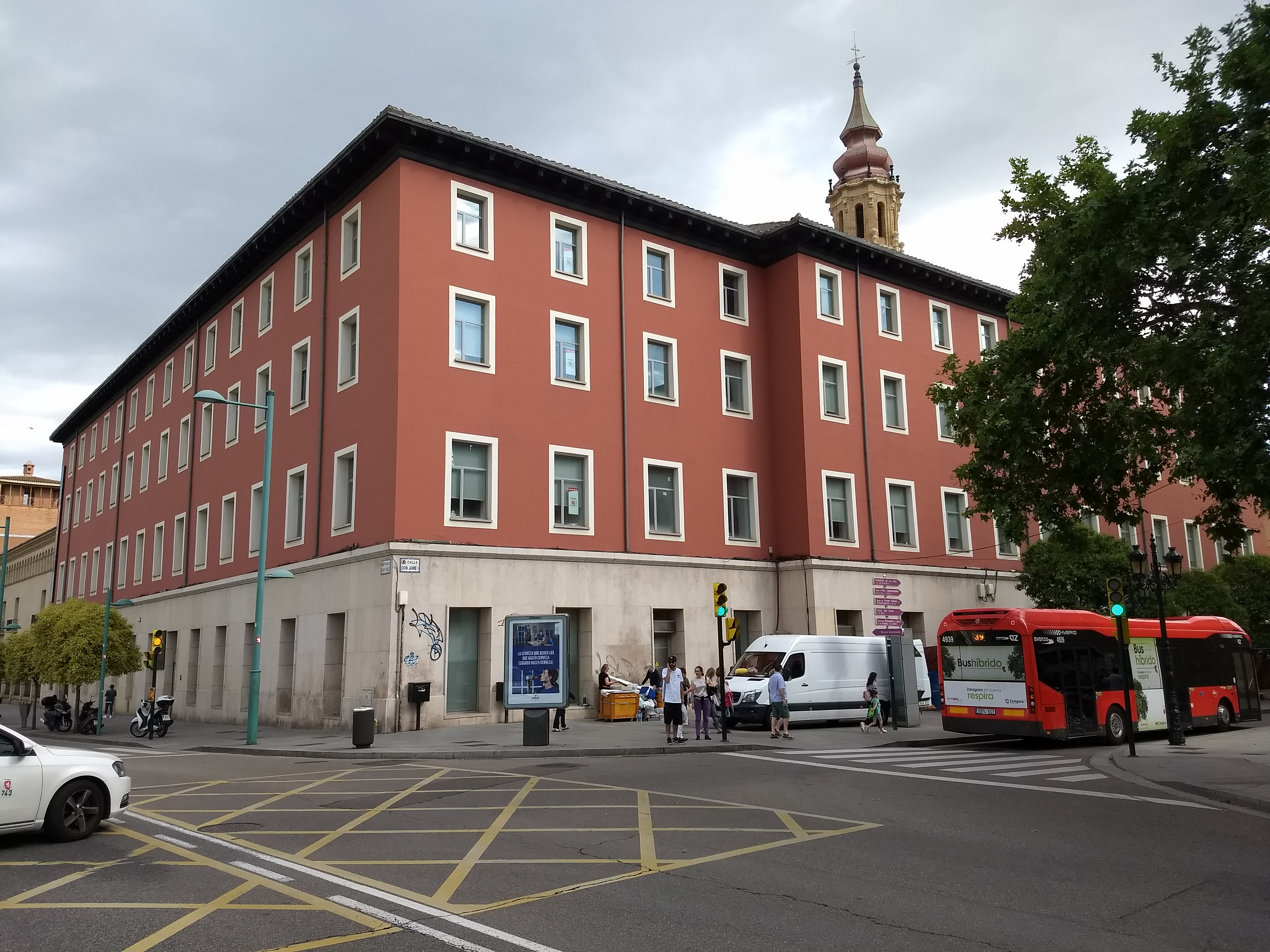
Former seminary, built on the remains of the Diputación's palace.

On January 27, 1809, several bombs from Napoleon's army besieging Zaragoza fell on the building, creating a three-day fire. However, the building was not completely burned by the flames but was largely spared. Part of the documentation kept in the archives was saved from the fire by being thrown out of the windows into the Plaza de la Catedral. The remains of the archives remained in the private home of Ramón de Les until 1820, when they were transferred to the newly created Diputación de Aragón (now the Deputation of the Province of Zaragoza).

Once its institutional function was abandoned, and in need of reconstruction, the building was abandoned by the public institutions while the neighbors took advantage of the construction materials. In addition, the palace was partially converted into dwellings that were inhabited until 1828.

In 1830 the palace was ceded to the Archbishop of Zaragoza. Immediately the construction of the Conciliar Seminary began, taking advantage of the remains of the old palace. In 1845 the remains of the Church of St. John were demolished.

== Remains and possible reconstruction ==
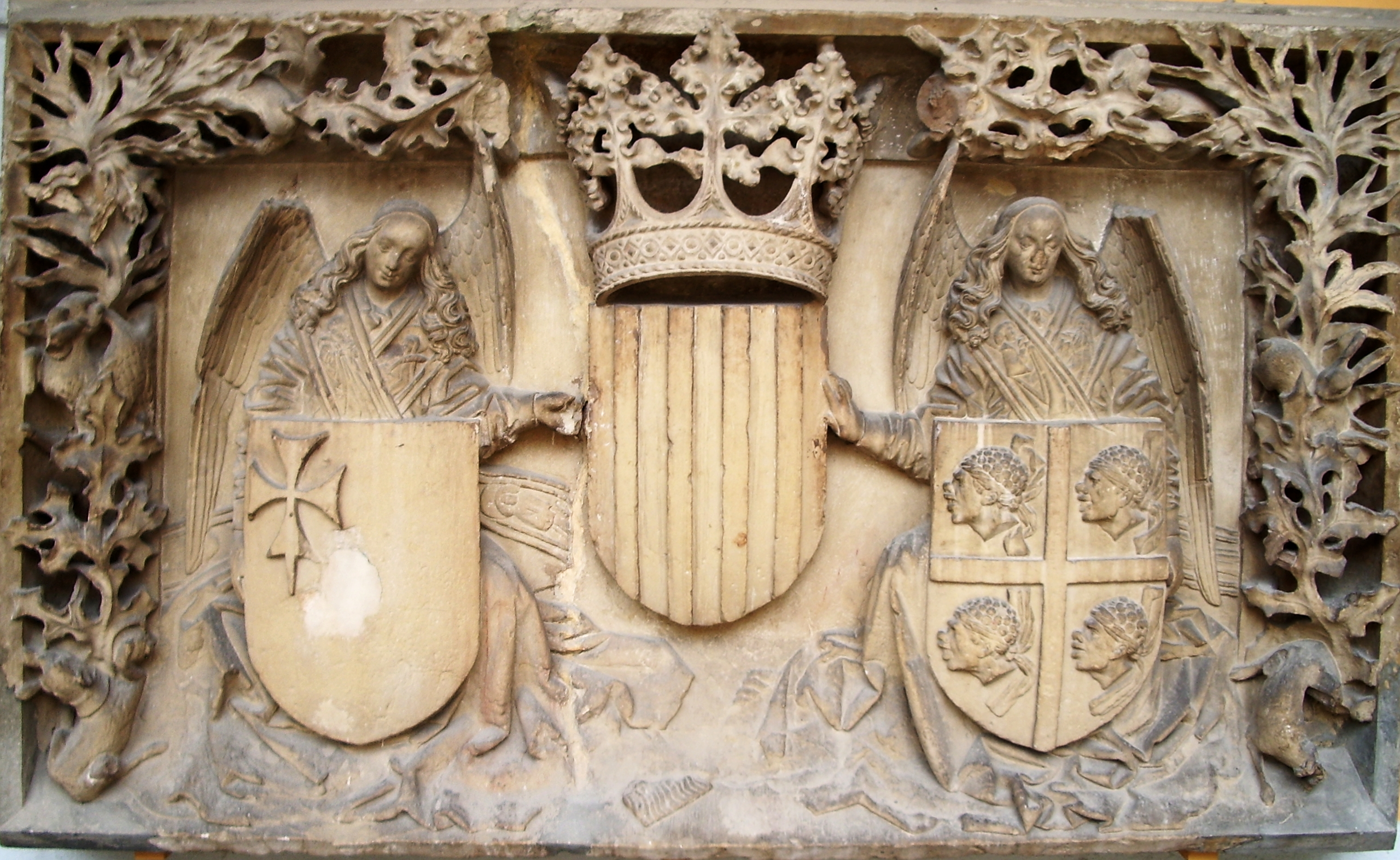
Coat of arms of the Diputación Palace (ca. 1450), today kept in the Zaragoza Museum.

In the Zaragoza Museum there are two reliefs with the coat of arms of the Diputación sculpted in sandstone, attributed to Franci Gomar and Fortaner de Usesques between 1448 and 1449.

Part of the files were saved and are preserved in the archive of the Diputación de Zaragoza. Another part is still missing and in private hands as an auction in 2017 brought to light.

Several sculptural remains from the building were discovered during the excavation of the Plaza de la Catedral in 1989. In addition, the foundations and part of the walls may have been preserved as part of the current building of the former Conciliar Seminary (now "Casa de la Iglesia").

In the 2015 election campaign the PAR candidacy proposed to rebuild the building again.

== Bibliography ==
- Armillas Vicente, José Antonio (2000). La Diputación del Reino de Aragón (in Spanish). Zaragoza: Caja de Ahorros de la Inmaculada.
- Canellas, Ángel (1979). Instituciones aragonesas de antaño: La Diputación del Reino (PDF) (in Spanish). Zaragoza: Institución Fernando el Católico. Archived from the original (PDF) on 2007-10-05.
