= Martín de Gurrea y Aragón =

Spanish nobleman

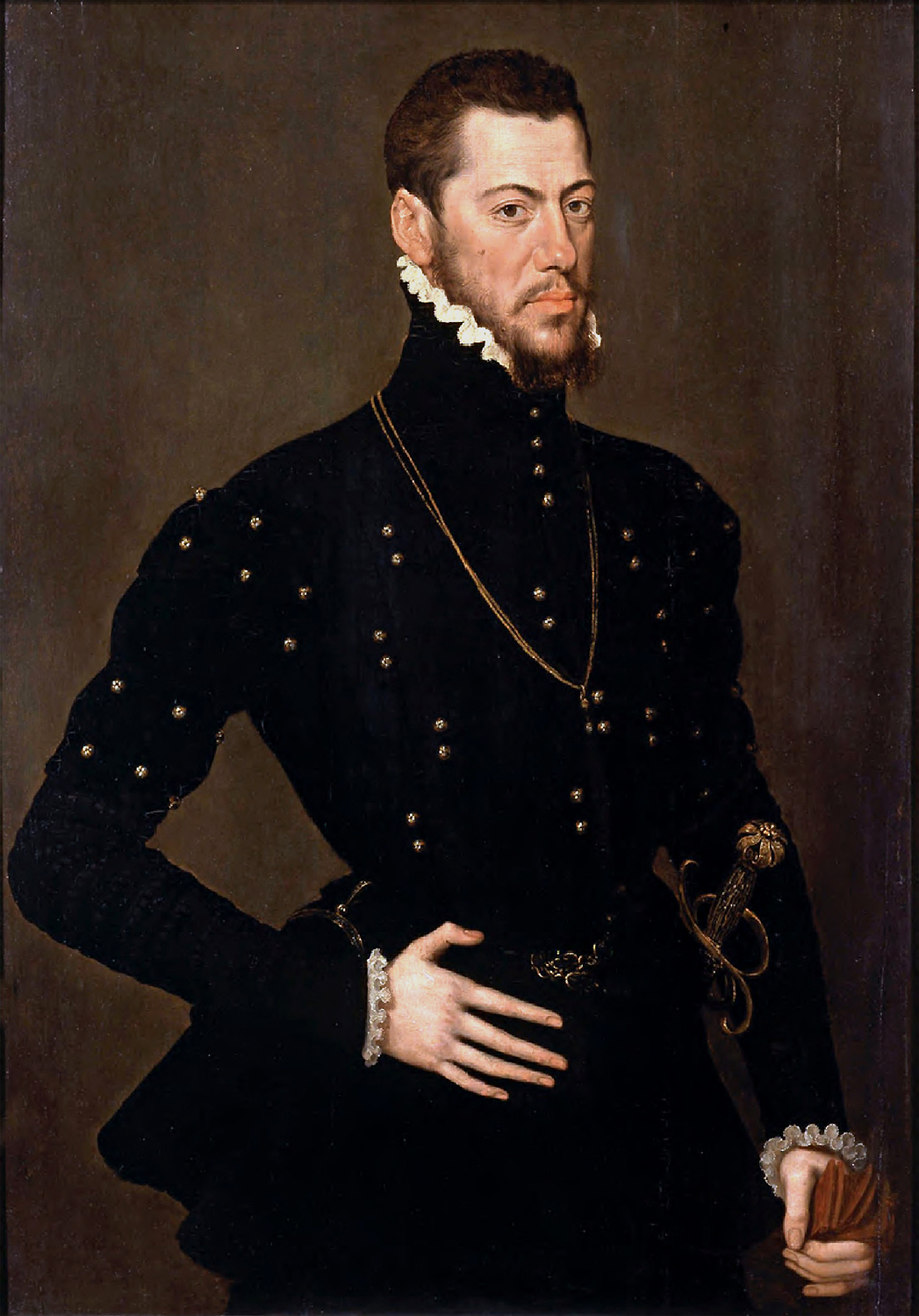
Portrait of Martin de Gurrea y Aragóna by Antonio Moro (National Museum of Stockholm).

Martín de Gurrea y Aragóna (17 May 1525 - 25 April 1581) was a Spanish nobleman from a royal line descended from John II of Aragon's son Alfonso. He was born and died in Pedrola. He was also notable as a collector and patron of the arts, commissioning artists such as Pablo Esquert.

He inherited the title of Count of Ribagorza on his father's death in 1550. He also became 4th Duke of Villahermosa in 1558 when the 3rd Duke (Fernando Sanseverino de Aragón, prince of Salerno) forfeited the title for supporting the King of France in Italy against the King of Spain.

== Family ==
The Dukedom of Villahermosa was created by John II of Aragon to recognise the military achievements of his illegitimate son by Leonor de Escobar, Alonso.: He was also made Count of Ribagorza. Alonso had an illegitimate son called John (1457-1528), who was recognised by John II as his grandson to reward his mother María Junquers, who had governed and defended Ribagorza in the count's absence.

John was Count of Ribagorza, viceroy of Aragon and then viceroy of Naples (1507-1509, in place of Gonzalo Fernández de Córdoba), but he did not inherit the duchy of Villahermosa, which passed to the legitimate son Alfonso de Aragón. John married the rich María López de Gurrea, through whom he gained possession of Luna and Pedrola. After the marriage John's descendants placed the surname Gurrea before that of Aragon. The couple had Alonso Felipe de Gurrea y Aragón (1487-1550), 3rd Count of Ribagorza, who married Isabel de Cardona y Enríquez de Quiñones, from the powerful Catalan Cardona family. After he was widowed, he remarried to Ana de Sarmiento de Ulloa y Castilla, wealthy descendant of the marshals of Castille and holder of the state salt concessions - with her he had Martín de Gurrea y Aragón.

== Life ==
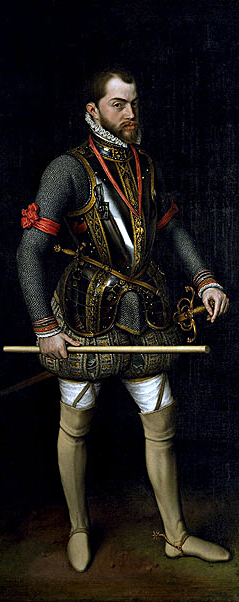
Portrait of Philip II by Antonio Moro.

Martín spent his early life in Pedrola, before being sent to Santiago de Compostela to be educated by his mother's brother cardinal Pedro Gómez Sarmiento, who educated him in Italian, Latin, ancient Greek and Hebrew. He then moved on to the court, where he served as minstrel to empress Isabel of Portugal and then page of the future Philip II of Spain as well as becoming friends with cardinal Granvelle. He also became friends with Philip, who he accompanied to England to marry Mary I and to Brussels in 1555 to witness Charles V's abdication of his rule over the Low Countries. He divided his time between court and his estates at Pedrola.

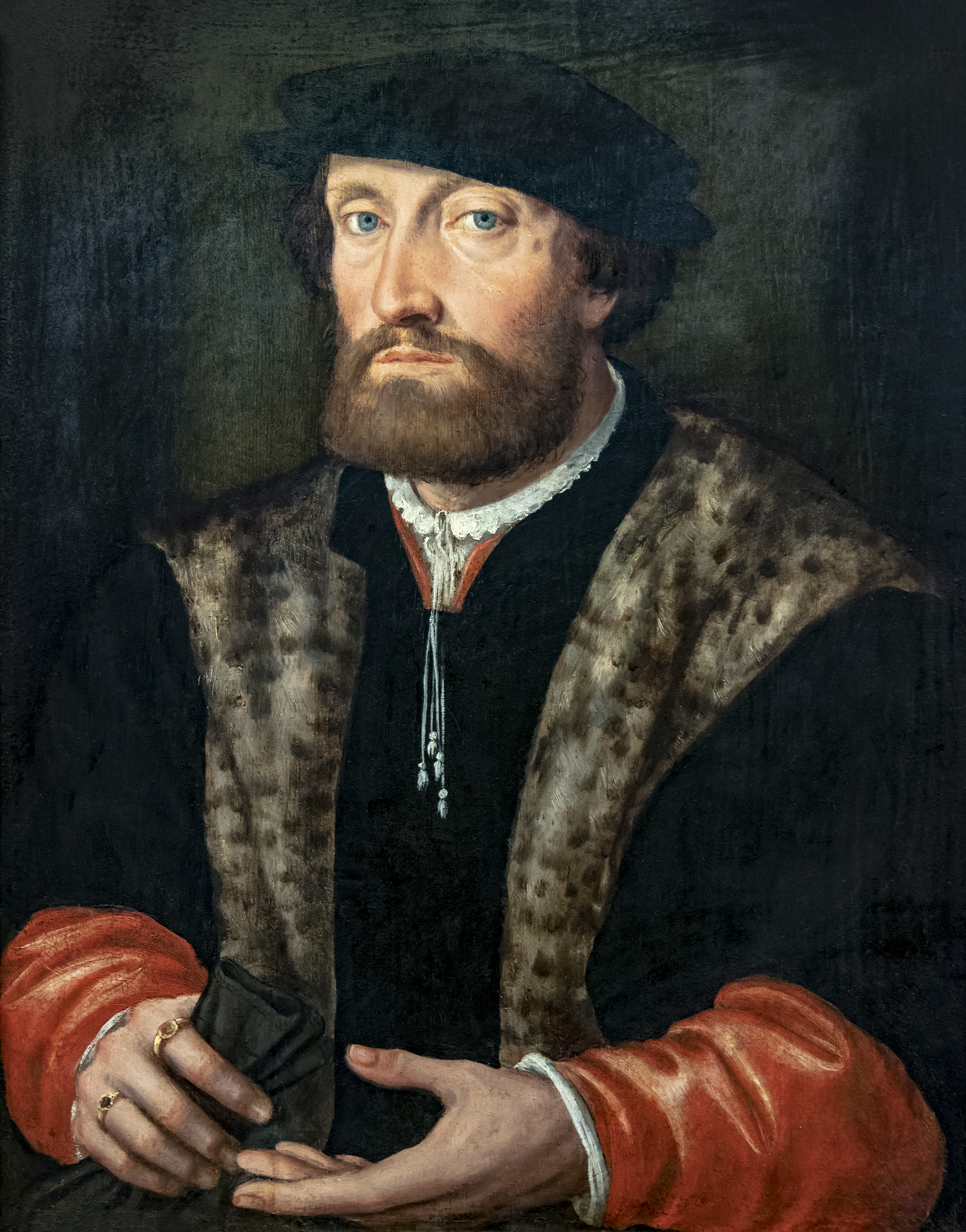
Portrait of cardinal Granvelle, by Frans Floris.

In 1557, Martín distinguished himself in the battle of St Quentin, gaining him royal favour. His personal fortune enabled him to pay for some of the political and diplomatic posts which followed, though he had to leave court to govern his possessions in Aragon after his wife's death in 1560. Martín remarried around 1542 to Luisa de Borja y Aragón, from the family of the Dukes of Gandía and great-granddaughter of the Borgia pope Alexander VI. Luisa died after having eight children: Juan, Fernando, Ana, Martín, Francisco, María, Inés and Juana (who died in infancy). All the children received a careful education, with Martín and Francisco even going to the University of Salamanca, which was unusual for major noblemen of the time. The duke married a third time after her death, to María Pérez de Pomar in 1566, with whom he had one child, Juliana. He also had two illegitimate daughters, María and Gabriela.

Rebellion in the County of Ribagorza faced a delicate situation muddied his relations with the court. On 6 June 1554 a court in Zamora took rights, rents and castles of the County out of Martín's hands and placed them directly back in royal control Martín then took his case to the Justiciar of Aragon. On 6 May 1565 he passed the County of Ribagorza to his eldest son Juan de Gurrea y Aragón, who he also betrothed to Luisa Pacheco Cabrera, daughter to the Count of Villena and Duke of Escalona. However, the wedding was delayed until 1569 by the lawsuit to regain control of the County, which eventually proved successful on 18 May 1567. However, the crown had allowed the County to be misgoverned in the meantime and the damage proved irreversible. Years after Martín's death, the line of the Counts of Ribagorza died out and the territory passed back under direct royal rule.

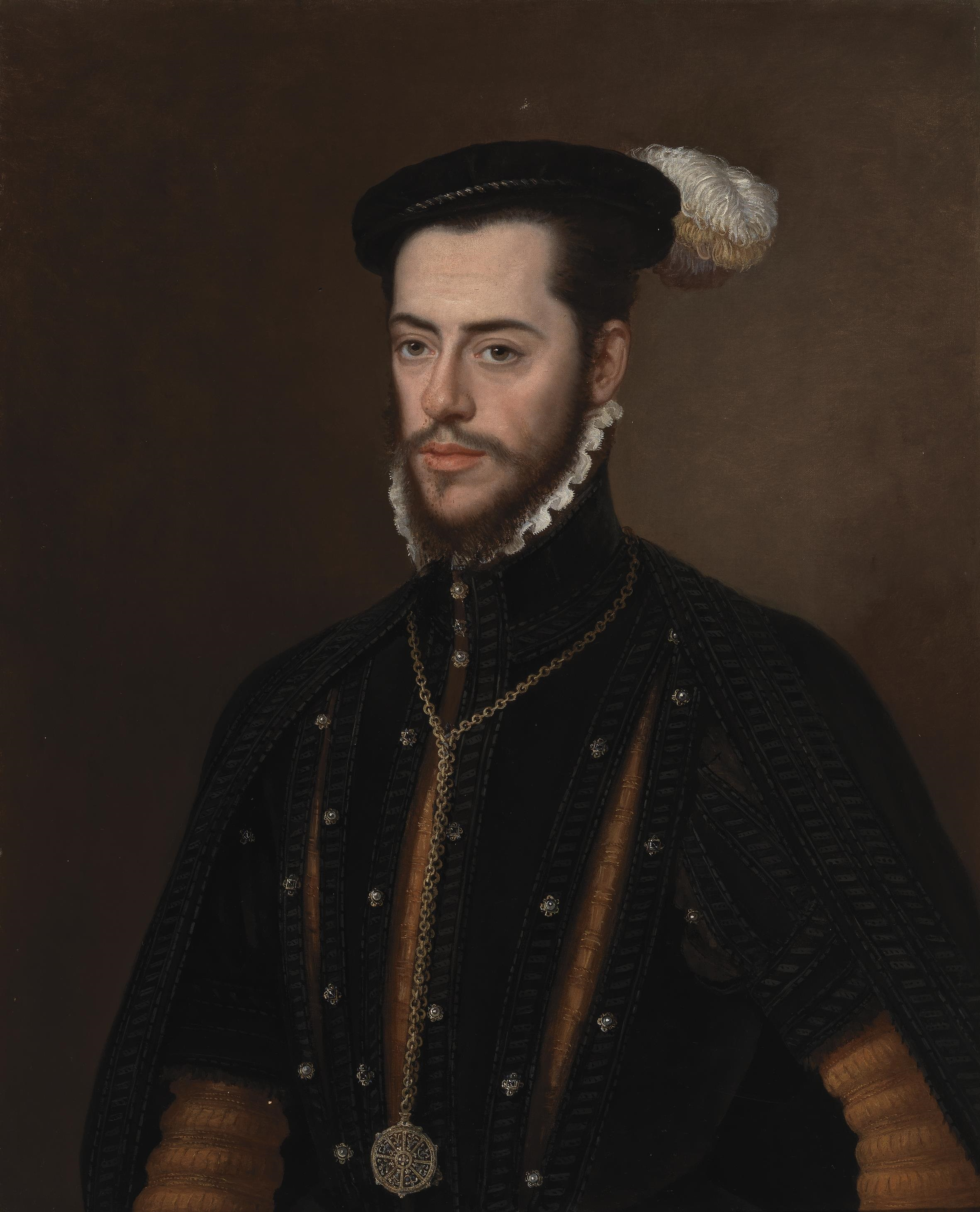
Martín de Aragón, by Gabriel Maureta. 19th century. (Museo del Prado, Madrid).

In 1571 his eldest son John was accused of murdering his wife. He escaped to Italy, but was captured and publicly executed there in 1573 at Torrejón de Velasco. This meant Martín re-assumed responsibility for the County of Ribagorza, meaning his courtly aspirations increasingly took a back seat Martín's final years were marked by the loss of several other loved ones - Philip II's sister Joanna of Austria (who Martín had known as a child), Diego de Arnedo (bishop of Huesca), John of Austria and Martín's own mother. In 1579 his friend the royal secretary Antonio Pérez was arrested. With these setbacks, Martín became more and more religiously devout, finally dying in 1581. The Duchy of Villahermosa, County of Ribagorza and his other titles were inherited by his son Fernando, who had married Juana de Pernstein y Manrique de Lara, lady-in-waiting to Maria of Austria.

== Patronage and cultural life ==
Thanks to his education, position and travels, Martín formed part of the humanist and artistic circles of his era. His tutor cardinal Sarmiento taught him to love classical antiquity. He became a good friend of cardinal Granvelle, who he met at court early in his life as well as in Flanders and Aragon. Granvelle introduced him to artistic circles in Flanders and there he met painters such as Roland de Mois, who worked for the duke. He also shared his passion for coin-collecting with Antonio Agustín. He also joined the circle of the major Aragonese art-patron don Hernando de Aragón, archbishop of Zaragoza, regent of Aragón and (like the Duke) a grandson of Ferdinand the Catholic. He was also a friend of church humanists like Diego de Arnedo and Pedro Cerbuna.

Martin also gathered a large art collection. Highlights included the set of portraits of the House of Villahermosa by Roland de Mois and the portrait of Martín himself by the royal portraitist Antonio Moro. He was also given a painting entitled The Rape of Europa by its artist Titian. The collection also included works by Michelangelo, Hieronymus Bosch, Peter Brueghel the Elder and others. He left his collection to Pedrola and to the Monastery of Veruela, for which he felt a special affection. His collection of coins and medals was one of the first such collections in Spain and he wrote on them in his work Discursos sobre medallas y antigüedades.

== Marriages and issue ==
In 1542 married Luisa de Borja y Aragón, with whom he had

- Juan de Gurrea y Aragón, 5th Count of Ribagorza.
- Fernando de Gurrea y Aragón, 5th Duke of Villahermosa.
- Francisco de Gurrea y Aragón, 6th Duke of Villahermosa.
- Martín de Gurrea y Aragón, baron of Entenza and Capella.
- Ana de Gurrea y Aragón, married Felipe Galcerán de Castro de So y Pinós, 10th Viscount of Ebol
- María de Gurrea y Aragón, became a nun.
- Inés de Gurrea y Aragón, became a nun.
- Juana de Gurrea y Aragón, died in infancy.

After his wife's death in 1560, he remarried to María Pérez de Pomar, with whom he had one child Juliana, who married Juan de Aragón, lord of Ballobar and Las Casetas. Martín de Gurrea also had two illegitimate children, María and Gabriela.Morejón Ramos 2009, p. 83

== Bibliography ==
- Iglesias Costa, Manuel (2001). Historia del Condado de Ribagorza. Huesca: Instituto de Estudios Altoaragoneses. Diputación de Huesca. Instituto de Estudios Altoaragoneses. ISBN 84-8127-121-7.
- Morejón Ramos, José Alipio (2009). Nobleza y humanismo. Martín de Gurrea y Aragón. La figura cultural del IV duque de Villahermosa (1526-1581). Zaragoza: Institución "Fernando el Católico" (C.S.I.C.) – Diputación Provincial de Zaragoza). Institución Fernando el Católico. ISBN 978-84-7820-972-9.

Spanish nobility
Preceded by Alfonso VII	Count of Ribagorza; 1550-1565	Succeeded by Juan de Gurrea y Aragón
Preceded by Fernando Sanseverino de Aragón	Duke of Villahermosa; 1550-1581	Succeeded by Fernando de Gurrea y Aragón
