= Fernando de Gurrea y Aragón =

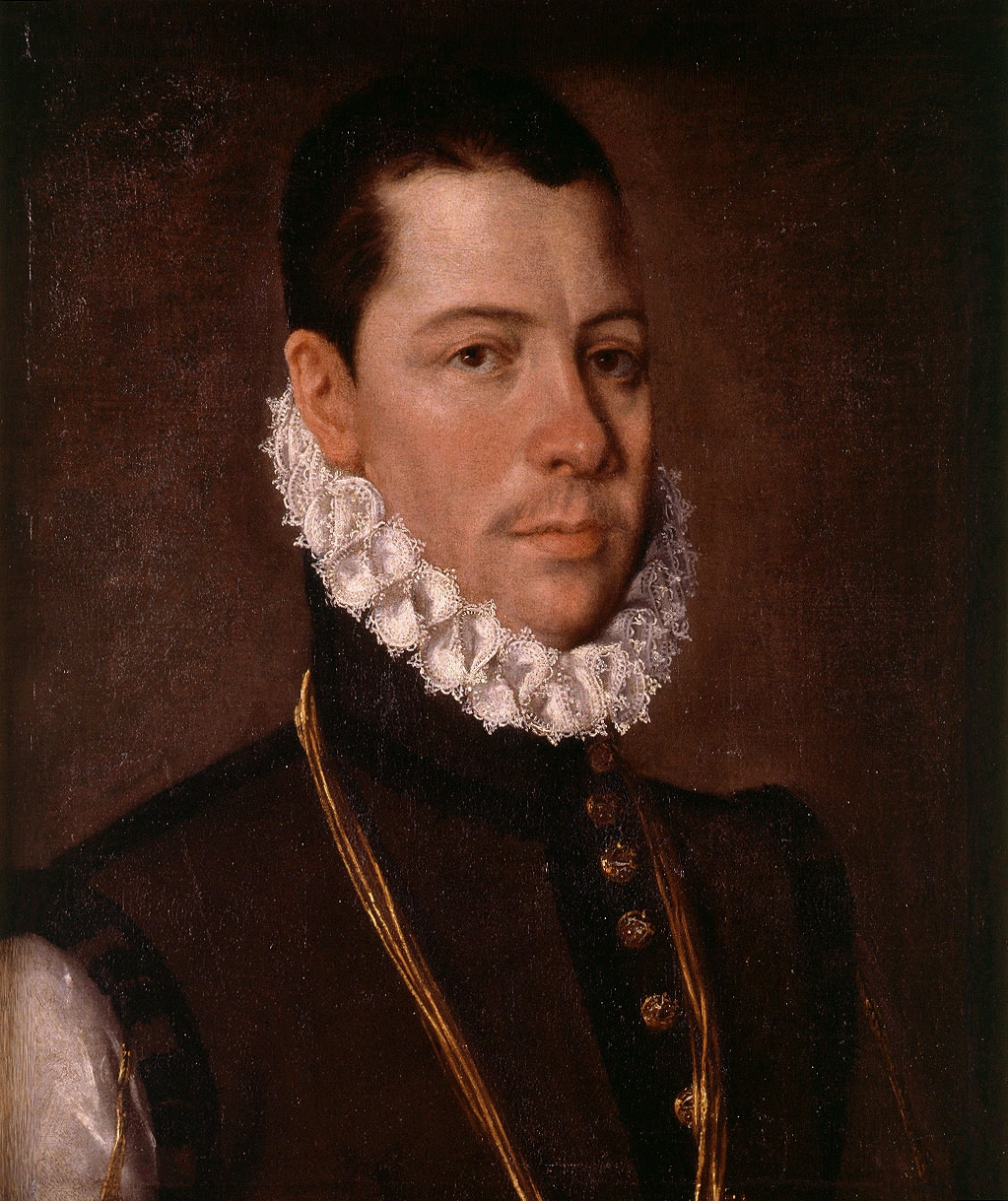
Painting of Fernando de Aragón y Borja by Roland de Mois.

Fernando de Gurrea y Aragón (Pedrola, 20 April 1546 – Miranda de Ebro, 6 November 1592) was an Aragonese nobleman. He was the fifth Duke of Villahermosa and Count of Ribagorza, titles he inherited upon his father's death.

== Biography ==
He was the second son of Martín de Gurrea y Aragón and Luisa de Borja, sister of Francisco de Borja.
In his youth, he pursued an ecclesiastical career, having an older brother, Juan de Gurrea y Aragón, 5th Count of Ribagorza. In this capacity, he served as prior of the Monastery of San Pedro de Caserras in the Diocese of Vic. But his brother's execution in April 1573 made him heir to the Ducal house of Villahermosa, leading him to abandon his ecclesiastical pursuits.

In 1582, he married the Bohemian noblewoman Juana de Pernstein, daughter of Vratislav II of Pernštejn, Chancellor of Bohemia and a lady-in-waiting to Philip II's sister, Empress Maria. They had 3 daughters.

Fernando de Gurrea y Aragón had to continue the bitter conflict that had already pitted his father against his vassals in the County of Ribagorza, a conflict that escalated into a brutal civil war, which brought him into disfavor with the Crown. He became also embroiled in the Zaragoza riots of 1591, was arrested by royal officials, imprisoned, and tried in Burgos. He died two months later in captivity in the castle of Miranda de Ebro, in unclear circumstances.

He was succeeded by his brother Francisco de Aragón y Gurrea as the sixth Duke of Villahermosa, who in 1591 ceded the County of Ribagorza to the Crown, receiving in return the title of Count of Luna and, in the Kingdom of Valencia, the encomiendas of Bexis y Castell de Castells, Terés y Teresa.

Spanish nobility
Preceded by Martín de Gurrea y Aragón	Count of Ribagorza; 1581-1592	Succeeded by Francisco de Gurrea y Aragón
Preceded by Martín de Gurrea y Aragón	Duke of Villahermosa; 1581-1592	Succeeded by Francisco de Gurrea y Aragón
