= Jooris van der Straeten =

Flemish portrait painter

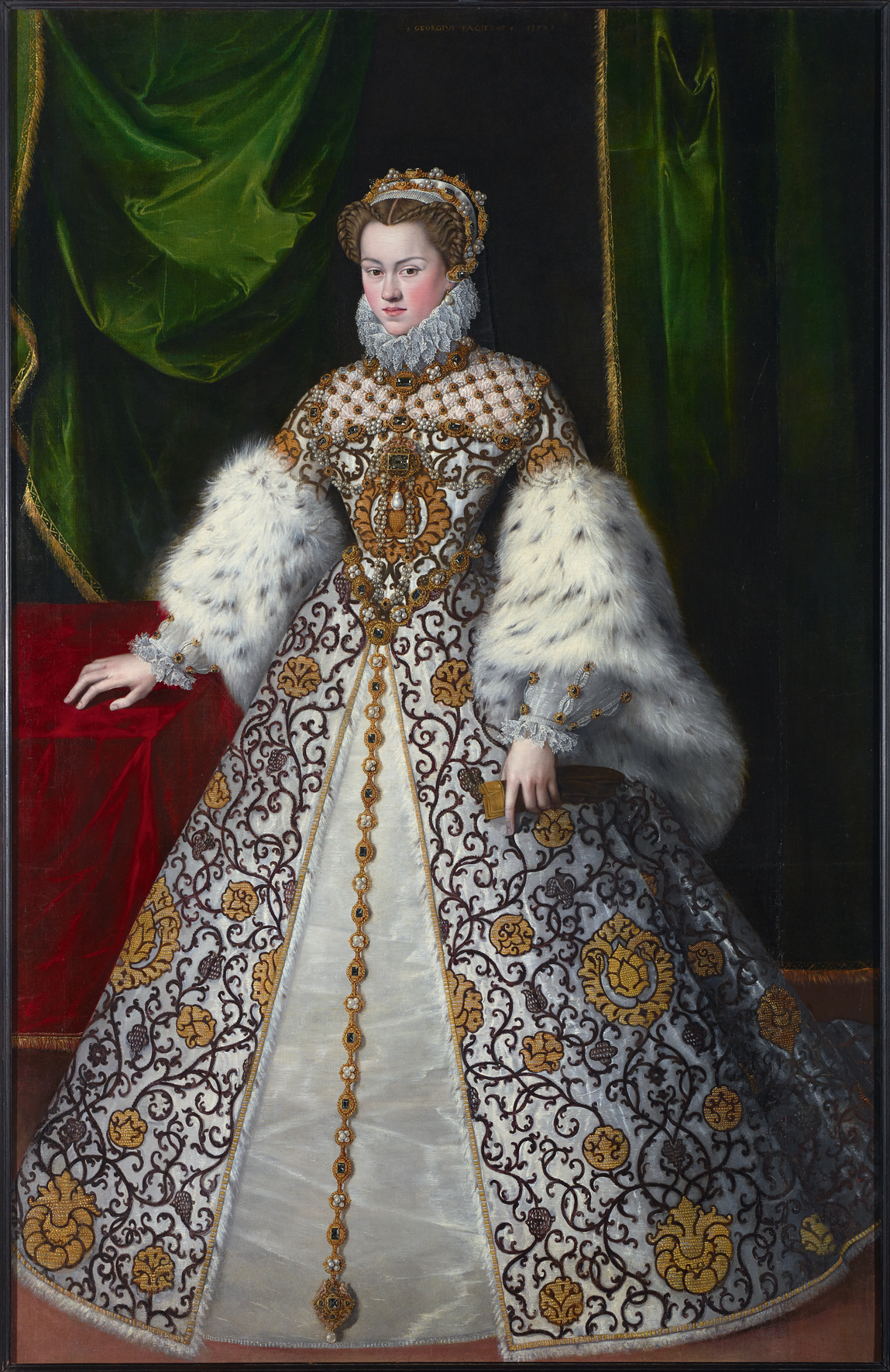
Elisabeth of Austria, Queen of France

Jooris van der Straeten, known as Jorge de la Rúa in Spain and in France as Georges van der Straeten (fl. 1552–1577), was a Flemish portrait and history painter. Originally from Ghent, he travelled abroad and became portrait painter to the ruling houses in Portugal, Spain and France. A polyglot, van der Straeten was a versatile courtier, who worked primarily as a portraitist for queens.

== Life ==
Jooris van der Straeten was originally from Ghent, which explains his alias of Joris van Gent (Joris of Ghent). It is believed he was a pupil of the prominent history and portrait painter Frans Floris in Antwerp. It is possible that he also trained under the prominent portrait painter Antonis Mor and travelled with him to the Iberian peninsula. He likely accompanied the future Spanish King Philip II when the travelled to England to marry the English Queen Mary I in 1554 as evidenced by the portrait he made of the future king with the order of the Garter. There are also bust and rondella versions of this work. After leaving England he worked in Portugal. Catherine of Austria, Queen of Portugal paid him in 1556 for a portrait of her grandson, the future King Sebastian of Portugal at the age of two.

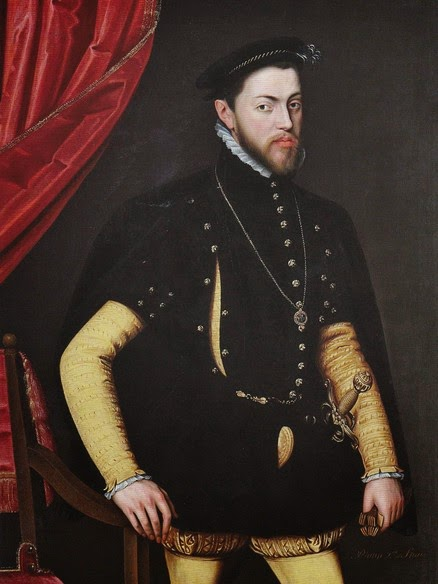
Portrait of Philip II of Spain

In 1559, he was recorded in Spain, with a commission to paint a Resurrection of Lazarus for the church of Santiago de Cáceres. He was documented from 1560 to 1568 under the name Jorge de la Rúa as painter of Elisabeth of Valois, the Spanish queen consort. He was her portrait painter together with the local painter Alonso Sánchez Coello, with whom he had also worked in Portugal. He also painted devotional works for queen Elisabeth. She paid a high sum for a painting of the Immaculate Virgin with five figures that hung over the queen's bed.

He was still at the Spanish court in January 1571, as he is documented at that time occupied with a portrait of the infantas Isabella Clara Eugenia and Catalina Micaela. The portrait had been commissioned by the Duchess of Alba. He made two copies, one of which was sent to the grandmother of the infantas, the queen of France Catherine de' Medici while the other was sent to the Duchess. The Duchess refused the work because of its high price. It is possible that this is the work preserved in the British Royal Collection that portrays the sisters with a puppy and a parrot. At the Royal Collection website this work is attributed to Alonso Sánchez Coello and workshop.

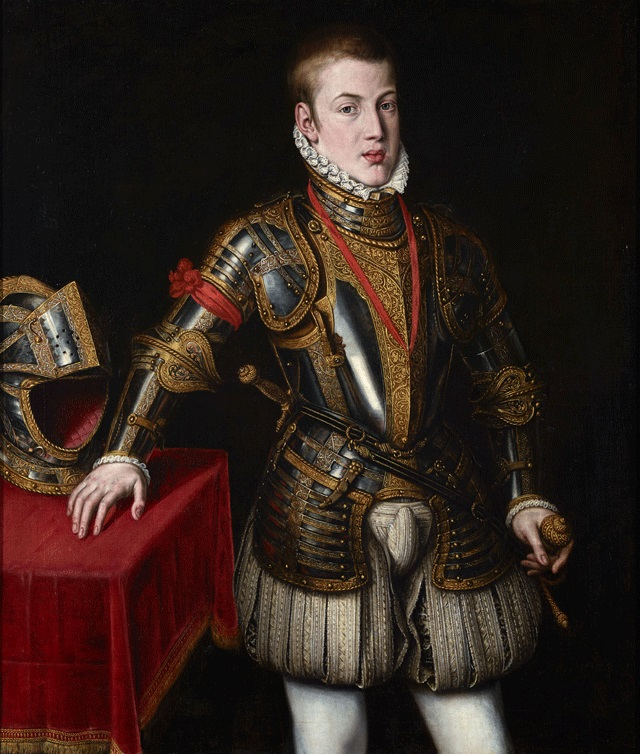
Prince Don Carlos in armor

The artist moved to France where he worked as a painter of Elisabeth of Austria, wife of Charles IX of France. He painted a portrait of the queen in 1573. This is the only signed and dated work by the painter and is preserved in the Convent of Las Descalzas Reales in Madrid. To Jorge de la Rúa is also attributed a portrait of Prince Don Carlos in armor in the Convent of Las Descalzas Reales. This work was previously attributed to the Portuguese painter Cristóvão de Morais. The artist worked in France also for Catherine de' Medici.

The artist made his testament in April 1577 while lying ill in bed in at a residence in Saint-Germain-des-Prés. He stated in his testament that he was a painter and valet de chambre (valet) of the French queen Louise of Lorraine. He further declared that he was the creditor of the queen and Nicholas Hilliard, painter to the English queen. The artist likely never married nor did he become a naturalised Frenchman.

== Work ==
While Jooris van der Straeten is mainly known as a portrait painter for rulers of the Habsburg and Valois, he also created Christian devotional scenes for his royal patrons.

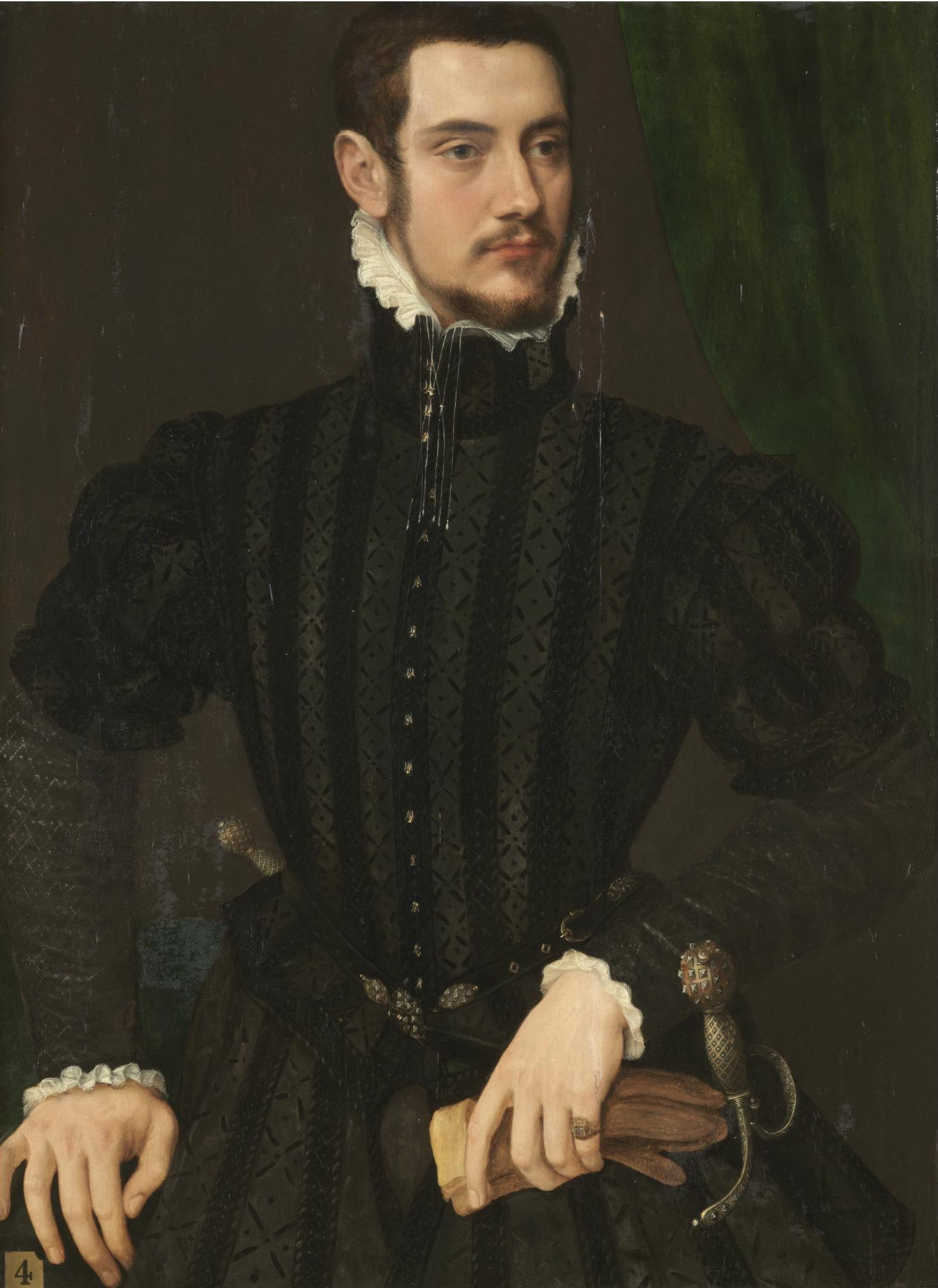
Portrait of a gentleman, said to be Perari Di Cremona

At the time he was working for the courts on the Iberian peninsula, many other portrait painters were active as court painters for the same ruling dynasty. They included Flemish painters Antonio Moro and Roland de Mois, as well as Spanish painters Alonso Sánchez Coello and Juan Pantoja de la Cruz and Italian painter Sofonisba Anguissola. As these artists were working within a same ideological framework, their depictions show many similarities. This has made attributions of unsigned works difficult and some works have been attributed to one artist and later to another one. For instance, the Portrait of Don Juan of Austria is now attributed to van der Straeten but was earlier attributed to Alonso Sánchez Coello.

The coherence of portraits made by painters working at the court of Philip II can be explained by the propagandistic purpose behind their creation and use. The conception behind the portraits of the Habsburg ruling family was to project an image capable of conveying the family's leading position in the world, its interests and dynastic destiny. Achieving a likeness in the portrait of the king and his family was secondary to giving form to the concept of the Habsburg majesty. The establishment and repetition of a series of conventions repeated by each court painter forged a uniform court painting procedure. This so-called 'Spanish school of portrait painting' typically depicted the royal sitters at full or three-quarter length in a not overly heroic but rather personal manner. This was because portraits also had a semi-private and familial as well as genealogical role. As the royal family was spread out over Europe, the portraits could be kept to remember close family members as well as serve in the negotiation of royal marriages to give a preview of the prospective spouse's appearance.
