= Roland de Mois =

Flemish painter

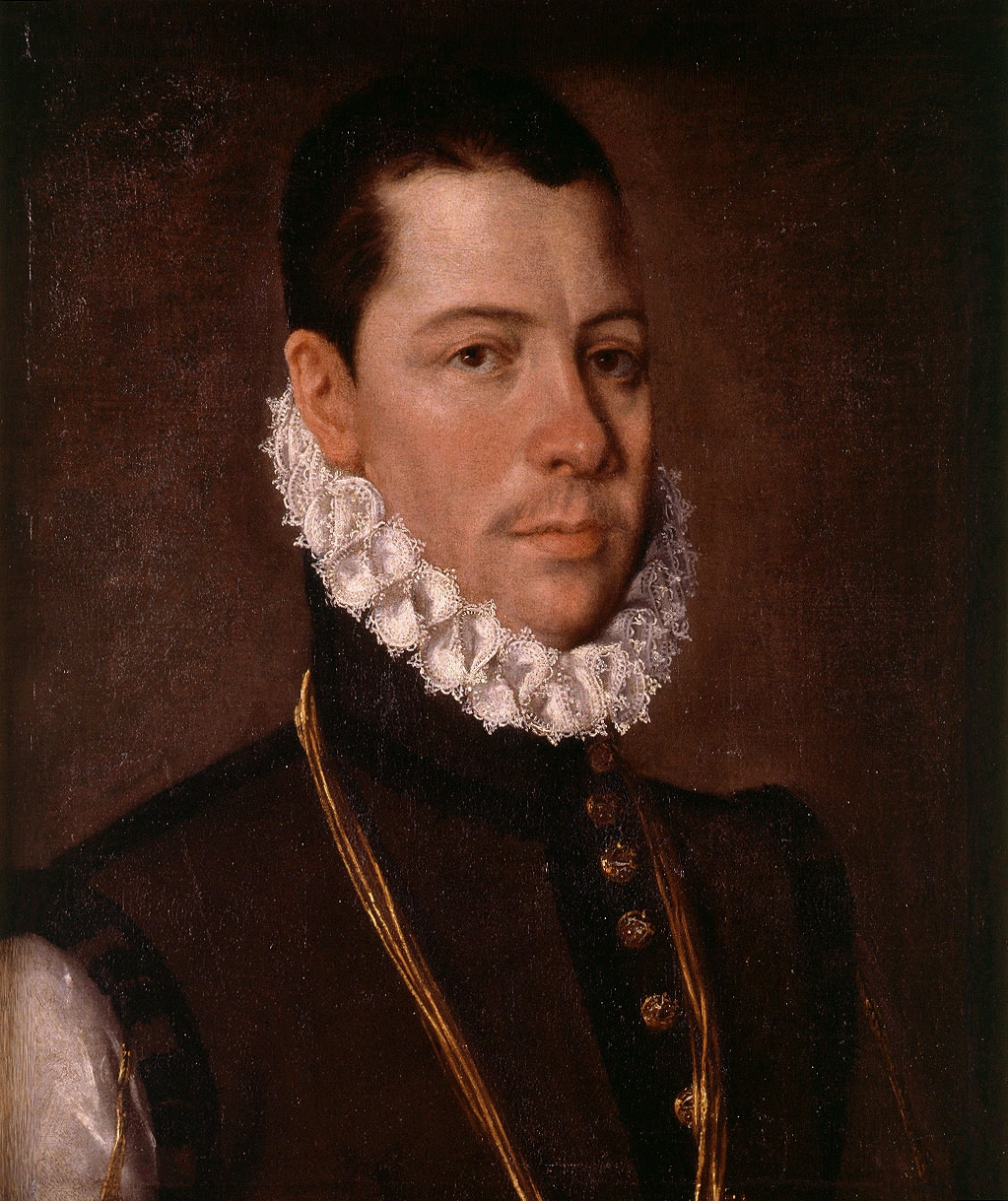
Portrait of Fernando de Gurrea y Aragón, 5th Duke of Villahermosa (c. 1573) by Roland de Mois. Museo de Bellas Artes de Valencia.

Roland de Mois (c.1520 – c.1592) was a Flemish painter of the Spanish Renaissance. He was born in Brussels and was active in Aragon from 1559 onwards, having been summoned there with Pablo Esquert by Martín de Gurrea y Aragón, Duke of Villahermosa. He died in Zaragoza.

In 2022, the Valencian Institute of Conservation, Restoration, and Research analyzed his "Assumption of the Virgin Mary" with X-ray, Fourier-transform infrared spectroscopy, and Raman spectroscopy. It was determined to have been made using an ink wash (aguada) technique using white lead.
