= Zaragoza Museum =

Museum in Zaragoza, Spain

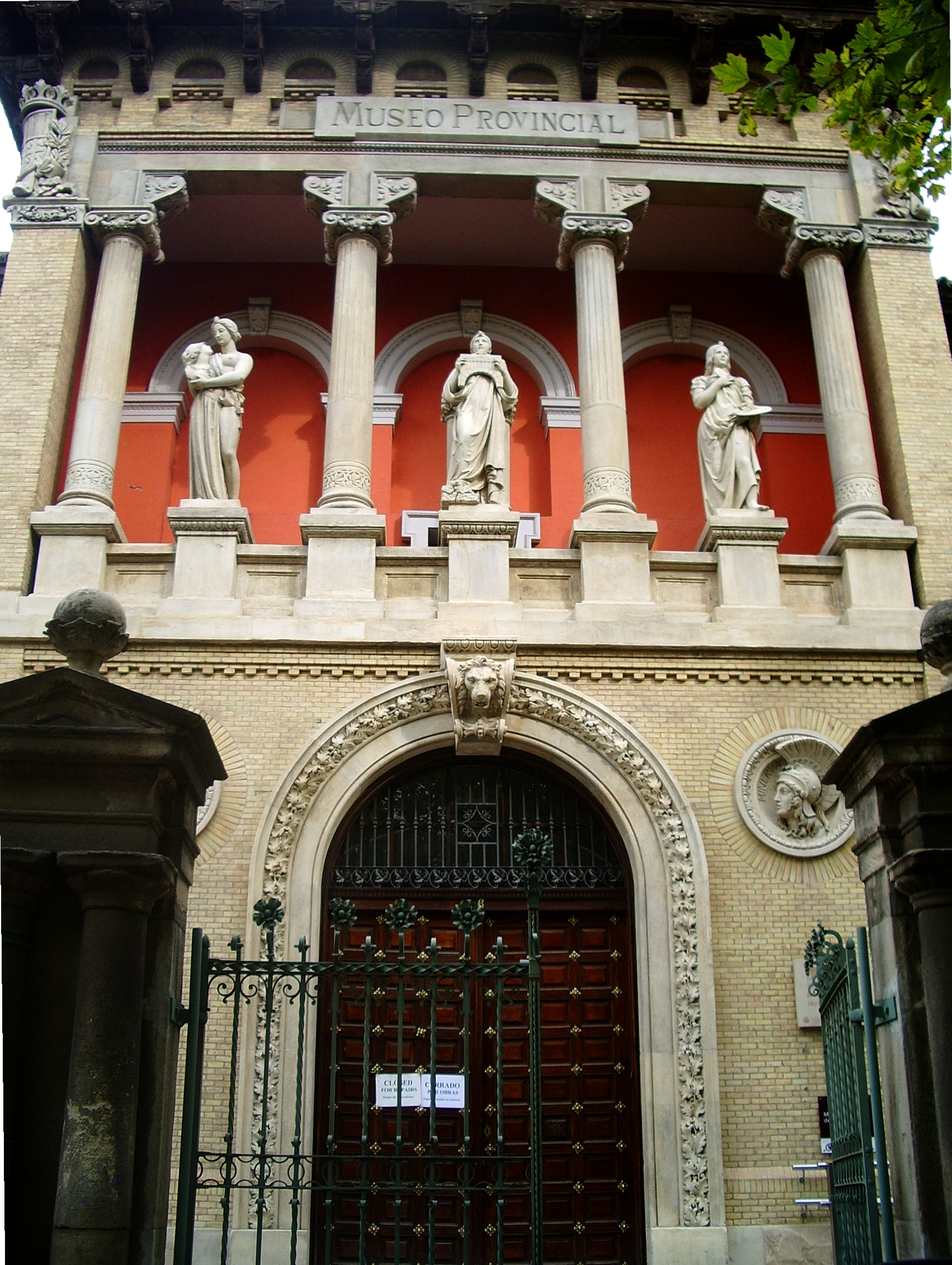
- Main building of the Museum
- Interactive fullscreen map
- Location: Zaragoza, Spain
- Coordinates: 41°38′54″N 0°52′43″W

Zaragoza Museum (Spanish - Museo de Zaragoza) is a national museum in the Plaza de los Sitios in the city of Zaragoza in Spain. Its collections range from the Lower Palaeolithic to the modern era and include archaeology, fine arts, ethnology and Iberian ceramics.

It is the city's oldest museum and its main building - housing the fine arts and archaeology display - is the Neo-Renaissance structure designed for the Spanish-French Exhibition of 1908 by Ricardo Magdalena and Julio Bravo. Its design was inspired by the Patio de la Infanta, home of the Renaissance merchant and patron Gabriel Zaporta. The museum also has an ethnology display at the Casa Pirenaica, a ceramics display at the Casa de Albarracín in the Parque José Antonio Labordeta and the remains of Colonia Celsa in Velilla de Ebro.

== Gallery ==
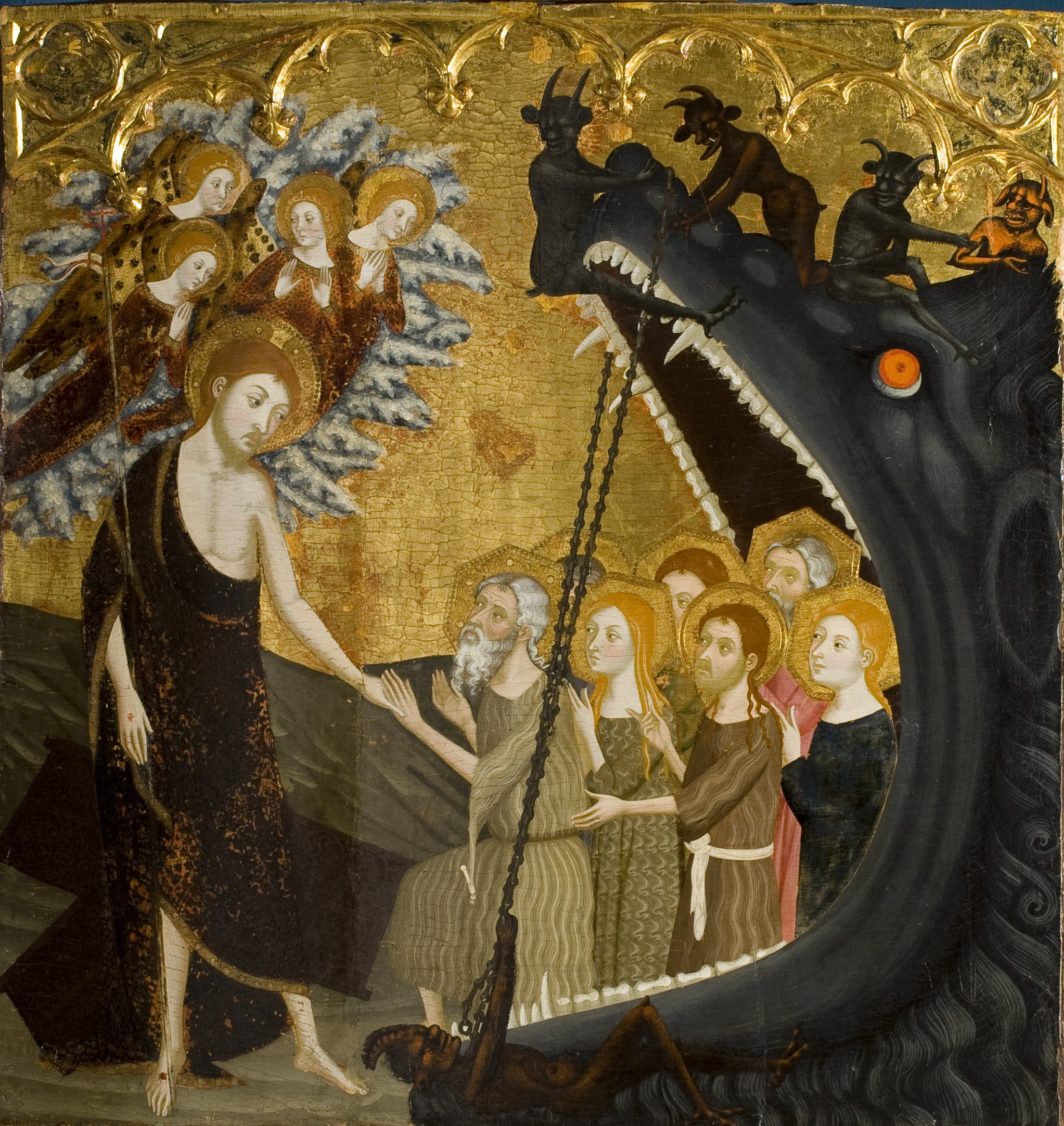
Descent into Hell, 1361–1362, by Jaume Serra

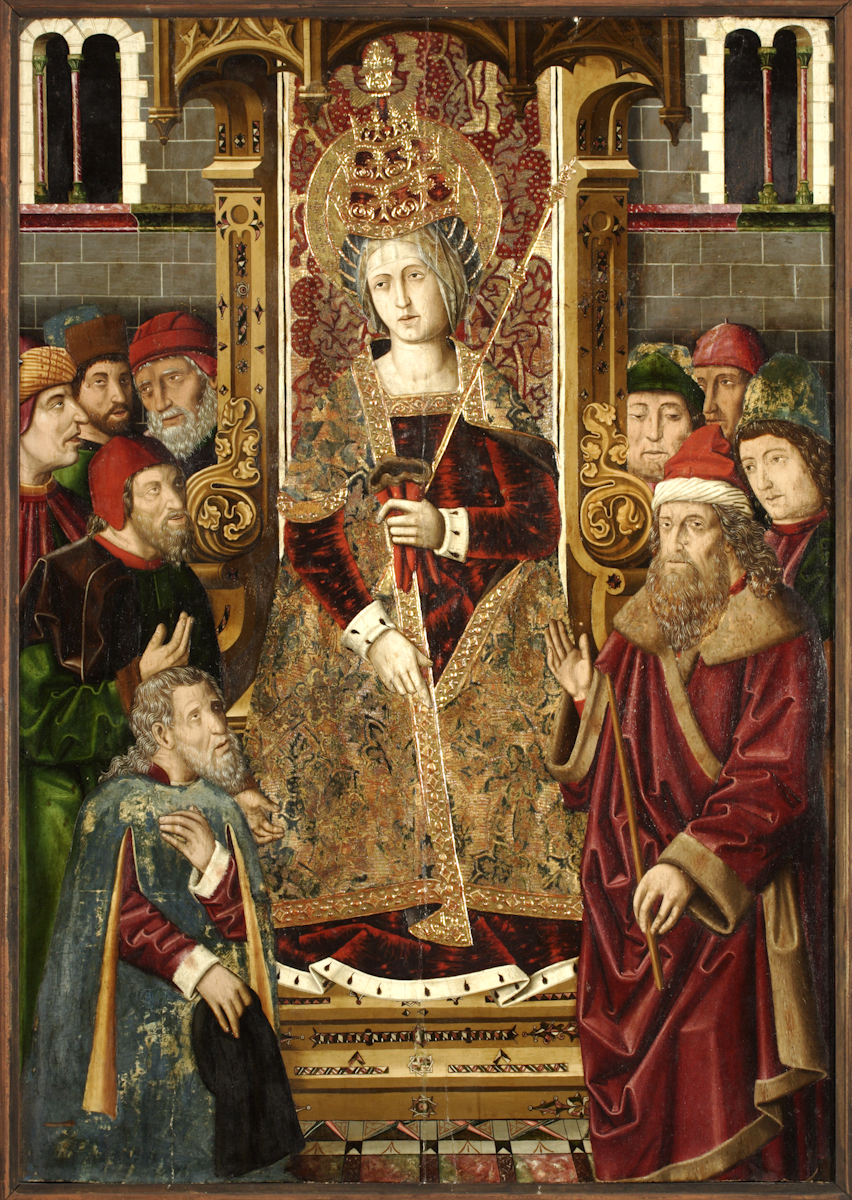
St Helena Meeting the Jews, 1483–1487, by Miguel Ximénez.

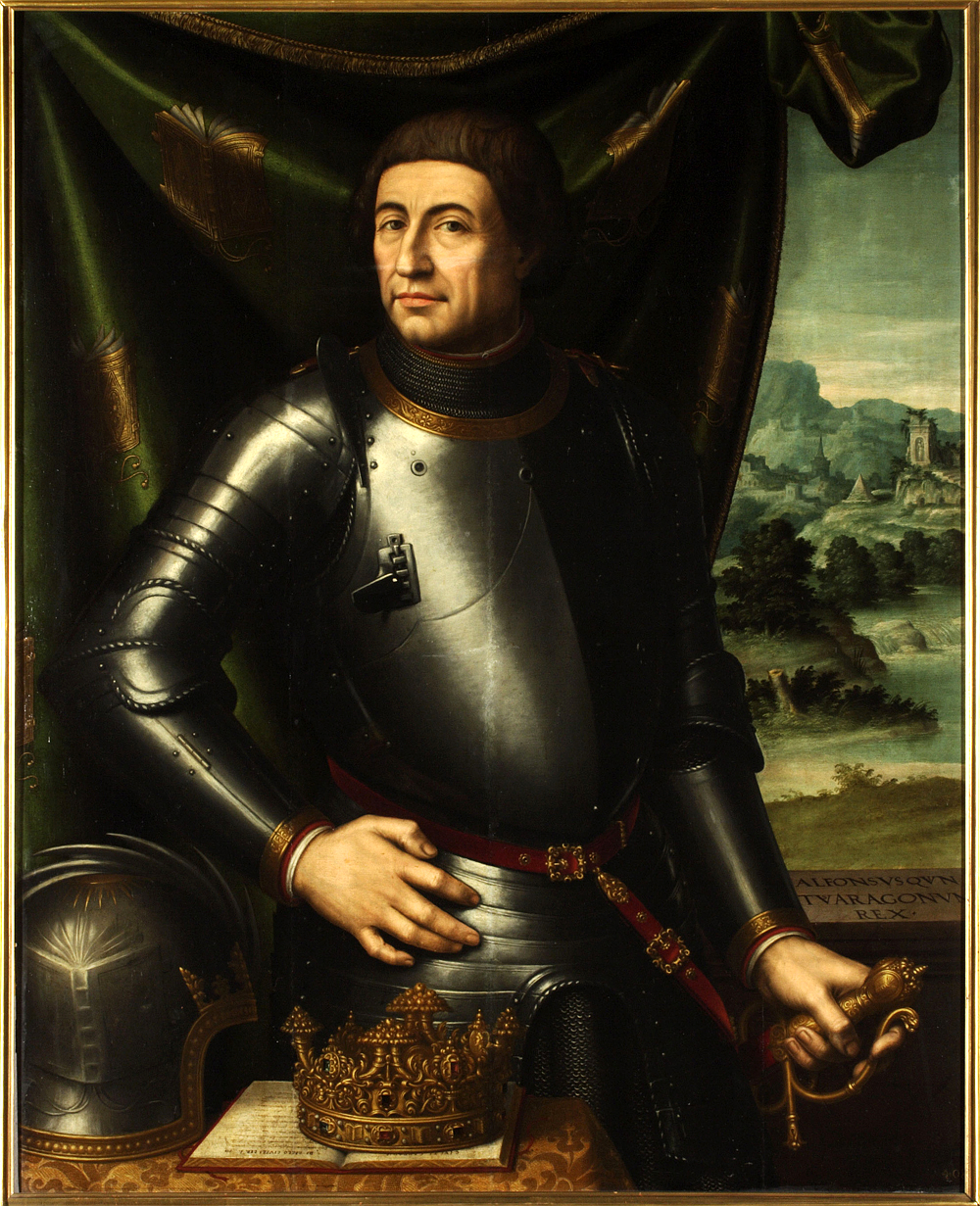
Portrait of Alfonso V of Aragón, 1557, by Juan de Juanes.

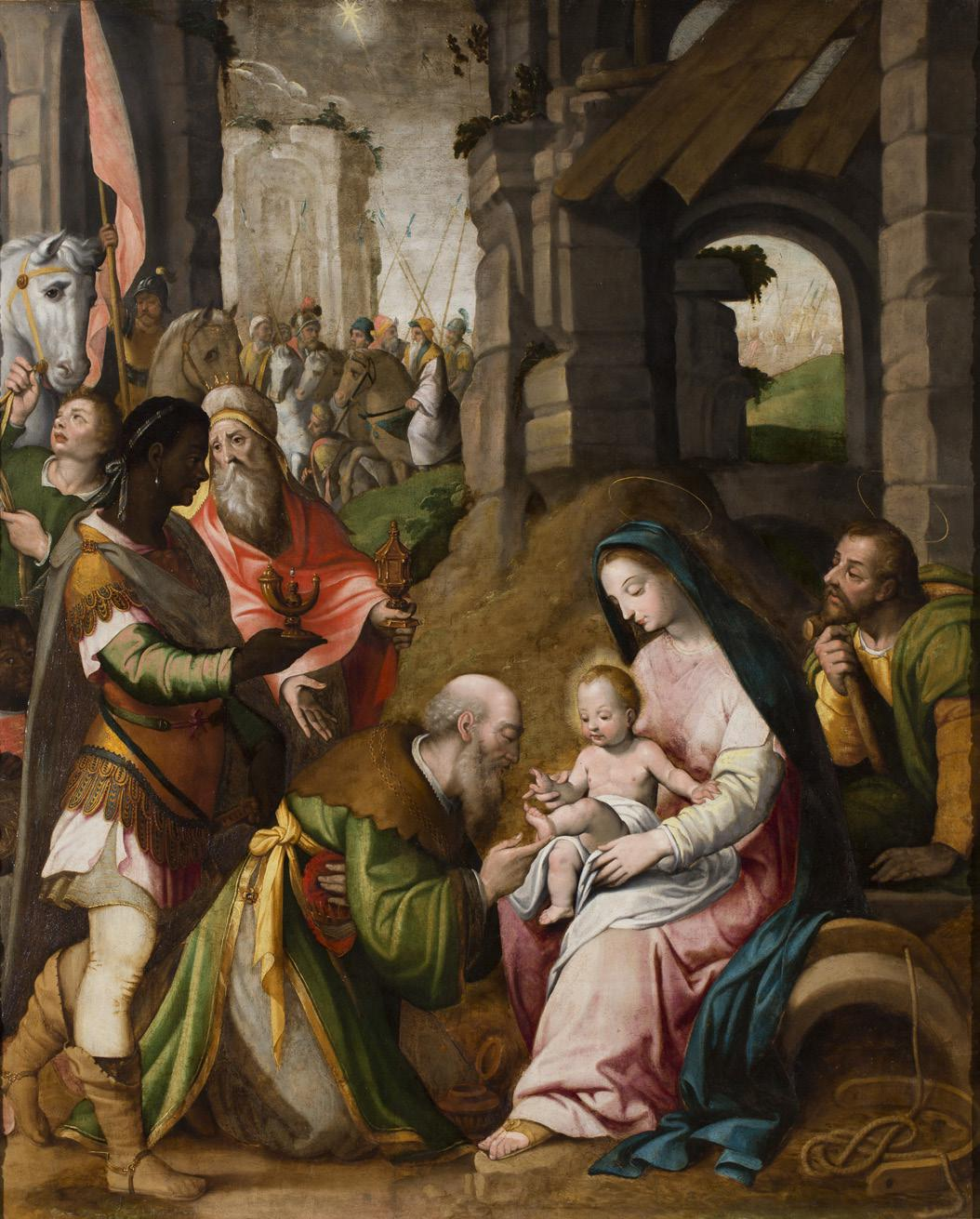
Adoration of the Magi, 1580–1585, by Pablo Esquert.

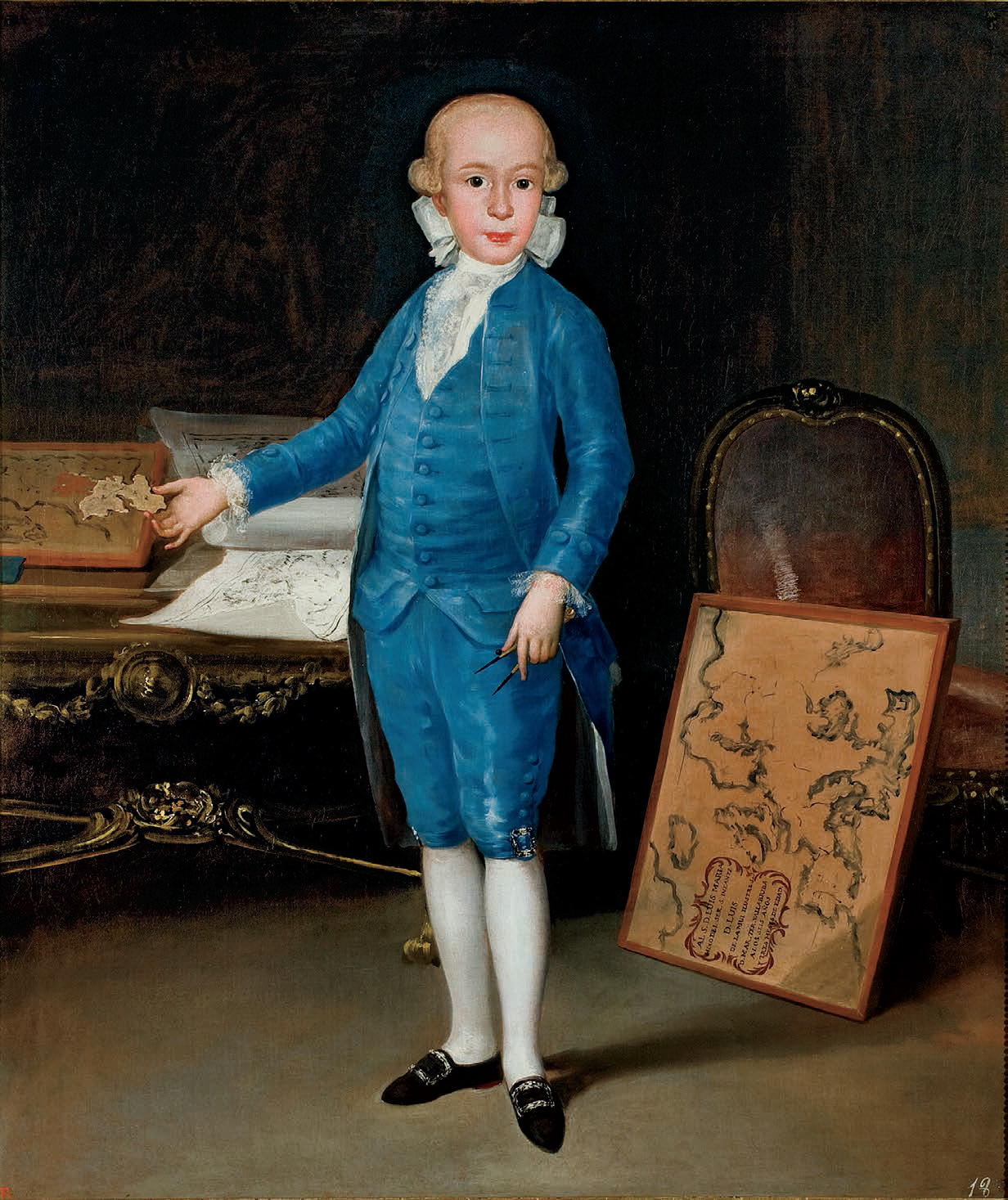
Portrait of Luis María de Borbón y Vallabriga as a Child, 1783, by Francisco de Goya.

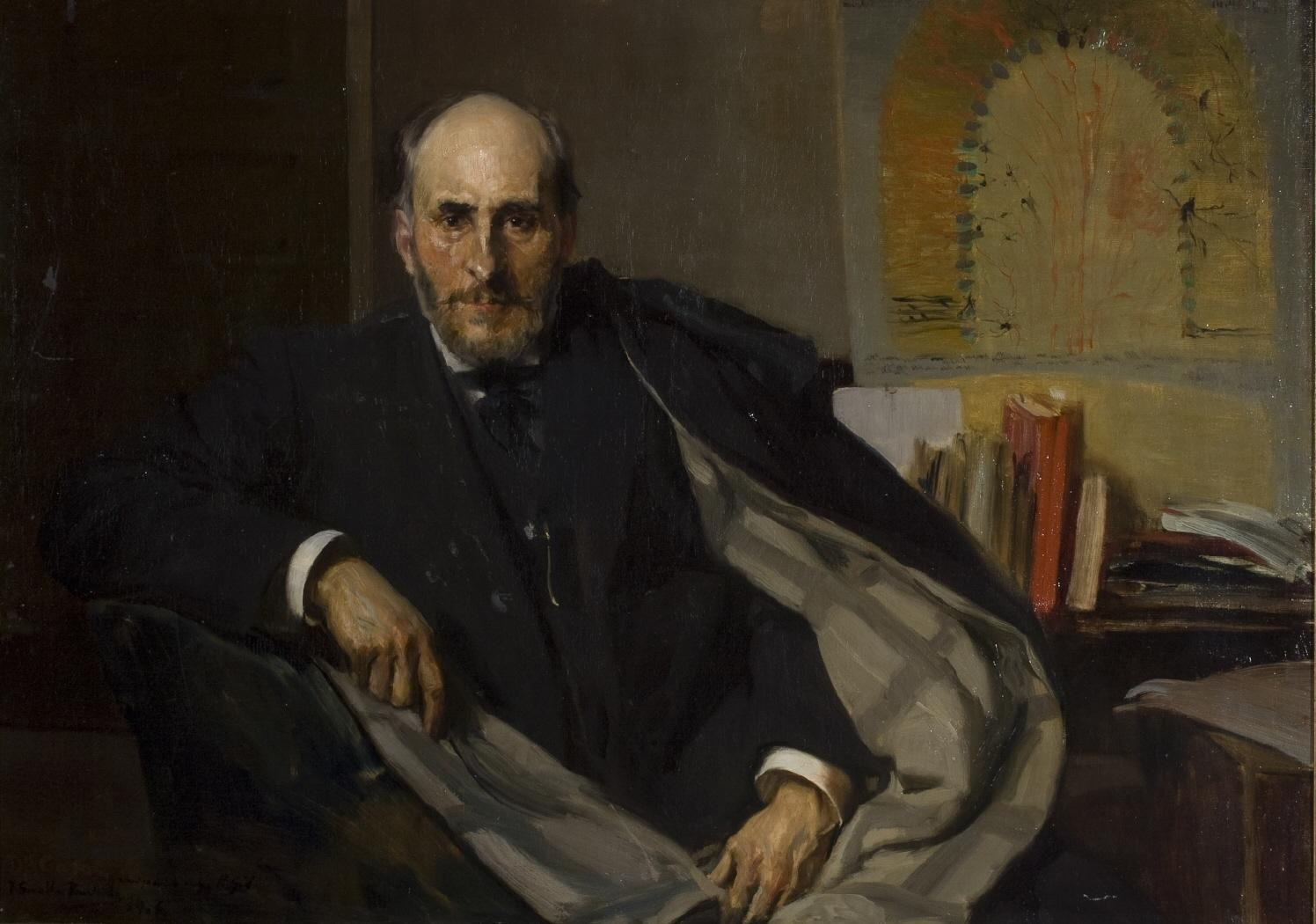
Portrait of Santiago Ramón y Cajal, 1906, by Joaquín Sorolla.
