= Fermín Abella y Blave =

Spanish jurist, writer, and civil servant (1832–1888)

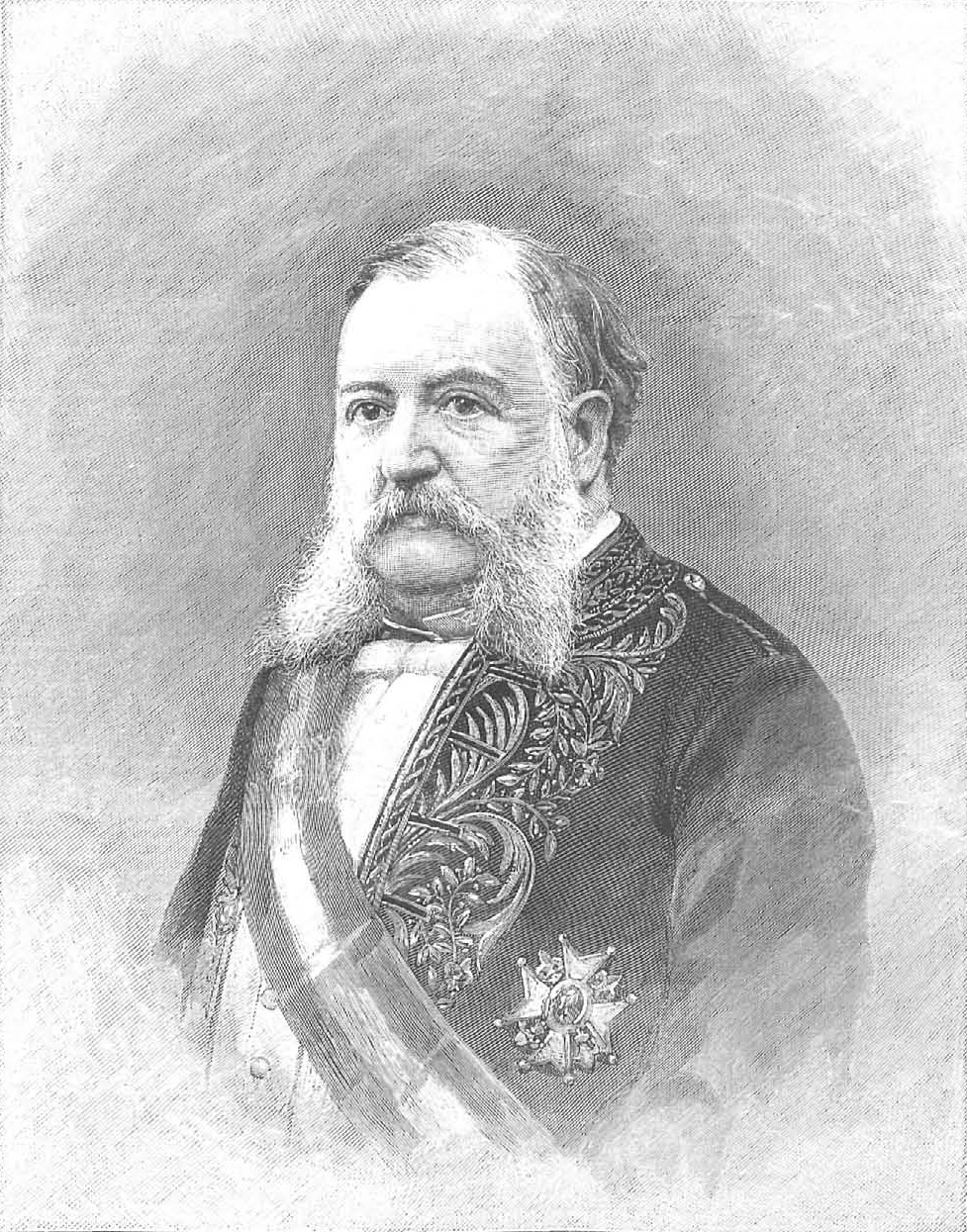
- Born: 7 July 1832; Pedrola, Zaragoza, Spain
- Died: 9 April 1888; Madrid, Spain
- Resting place: Cementerio de San Isidro, Madrid, Spain
- Education: Bachelor in Jurisprudence - University of Zaragoza
- Occupations: Jurist, Writer, Editor, Civil Servant
- Spouse: Josefa Fuertes de la Torre
- Children: Pilar Abella Fuertes; Josefa Abella Fuertes; Asuncion Abella Fuertes; Gloria Abella Fuertes; Joaquín Abella Fuertes; Manuel Abella Fuertes; Ricardo Abella Fuertes
- Writing career
- Language: Spanish
- Years active: 1854-1888
- Period: 1840-1888
- Genre: Law
- Subjects: Administrative Law, Jusrisprudence, Tax Law, Land Law
- Notable work: El Consultor de los Ayuntamientos y de los Juzgados Municipales

Fermín Abella y Blave (1832–1888) was a Spanish jurist, writer, editor and civil servant.

== Early life and education ==
He was born in Pedrola, in the Province of Zaragoza, Spain, on 7 July 1832 to Joaquín Abella y Pallarés and Francisca Blave Goser. His father was a judge of first instance in Pina de Ebro, executed by Carlist partisans during the Carlist Wars for his service to the monarch. Upon Isabella II's restoration, the Queen granted the young Fermín an orphan's annuity of 5500 Reales on 10 August 1840. Abella y Blave studied law at the University of Zaragoza where, even as an undergraduate, he was soon entrusted with substitute teaching of Roman law. He obtained his bachelor's degree in civil and canon law on 28 August 1854 and joined the city's Bar Association the same year.

== Civil Service career ==
In 1856 Abella y Blave entered the civil service as a junior official at Zaragoza's Public Works administration, in the department responsible for waters. His work there made him realize the necessity of a central repository of all relevant legislation for the benefit of administration and citizens alike, resulting in the publication of his first small volume "Manual de Aguas y Riegos"("Manual of waters and irrigation")in 1861. He slowly progressed through the ranks, acquiring a reputation for competence that, coupled with his close friendship with Juan Cavero, newly appointed Governor of Córdoba, eventually led him to be appointed Government Secretary for said province in 1864. An appointment to the same position in Huesca followed and shortly after he was made subgovernor for the municipality of Reus and the Island of Menorca. In 1867 he was transferred to the provincial government of Madrid as Head of Administration and in July of the same year was promoted to Head of Administration, 2nd class, at the central government's Overseas Ministry. He resigned his position at the outbreak of the Glorious Revolution in October 1868.

== Author and editor ==
Removed from his administrative tasks, Abella y Blave concentrated his mind in a different direction. From the beginning of his career, he had published a variety of works on matters of civil law and administration. On 29 March 1868 he had taken on the editorship of the journal El Consultor de los Ayuntamientos y de los Juzgados Municipales (Consultant of the municipalities and municipal courts, founded by Marcelo Martínez Alcubilla in 1851) replacing Celestino Mas y Abad and Eusebio Freixa y Rabasó. By January 1869, he became its director and sole proprietor. He subsequently founded and directed other periodicals such as El Boletín de la Administración Local, Pósitos y Juzgados Municipales (The Local Administrationm Cereal Deposit and Municipal Courts' Bulletin) and El Consultor de los Parrocos (the Parish Priests' consultant) in 1872.

== Royal household ==
In 1875, the newly proclaimed king Alfonso XII appoints Abella y Blave Secretary of the Intendancy of the Royal Household and Properties. During his tenancy he was entrusted with temporary substitution of the Royal Head Librarian (Manuel Remón Zarco del Valle) and the General Intendant of the Royal Household and Properties (Bonifacio Cortés Llanos) in periods of the formers' absence. Upon Cortés Llanos' retirement in December 1885, Abella y Blave was promoted to General Intendant and remained in post until his death in 1888.

== Works ==
Abella y Blave was also a prolific author on a vast variety of legal topics. His necrology mentions a legacy of more than 60 books, some of which became standard works, such as his Manual teórico práctico de los Juzgados Municipales (theoretical and practical manual of municipal law courts).

Other works include:

- Manual de Aguas (Huesca: J. M. Pérez, 1861) (Manual of Waters and Irrigation)
- Ley de organización y atribuciones de los Ayuntamientos : con las reformas en ella introducidas por el Real Decreto de 21 de Octubre de 1866 (Madrid: Imp. del Hospicio, 1867)
- Ley de organización y atribuciones de los Ayuntamientos; con las reformas en ella introducidas por el Real Decreto de 21 de Octubre de 1866, 1867
- Manual de contribuciones y nuevos impuestos, 1867
- Administración municipal : libro de los alcaldes, ayuntamientos y secretarios (Madrid: Oficina Tipográfica del Hospicio, 1867)
- Manual administrativo de sanidad marítima y terrestre (Madrid: Oficina Tipográfica del Hospicio, 1868)
- Derecho administrativo provincial y municipal o Tratado general teórico práctico de las atribuciones de las Diputaciones Provinciales y Ayuntamientos en todas las ramas (6 vols, Madrid: E. de la Riva, 1877-1880)
- Diccionario abreviado del Derecho Civil escrito de acuerdo con la legislación vigente, antigua y moderna, Derecho foral, Jurisprudencia civil, novísimas leyes hipotecaria, del matrimonio y del Registro civil, del desahucio, de aguas, etc (Madrid: E. de la Riva, 1877)
- Manual administrativo de sanidad terrestre y marítima arreglado a todas las disposiciones vigentes que se han dictado, ... desde la ley de sanidad de 28 de noviembre de 1855 hasta septiembre de 1879 (Madrid: E. de la Riva, 1879)
- Diccionario general de formularios : escritos y ordenados con arreglo a las disposiciones vigentes... y a los usos, prácticas y costumbres generalmente seguidos en los negocios civiles, criminales, administrativos, mercantiles, eclesiásticos, notariales y privados (Madrid: E. de la Riva, 1881)
- Juicio de desahucio (Madrid: E. de la Riva, 1881)
- Manual del Secretario de Ayuntamiento o Tratado teórico-práctico de administración municipal : en el que se explica ampliamente las atribuciones de los Ayuntamientos, Alcaldes y Secretarios... (Madrid: E. de la Riva, 1886)
- Manual de expropiación forzosa y obras públicas : comprende la explicación de la ley y reglamento sobre expropiación, formularios para los expedientes y diligencias que deben practicarse, y la legislación antigua y novísima dictada hasta el día... además las leyes y reglamentos de obras públicas, ferrocarriles, carreteras... (Madrid: E. de la Riva, 1887)
- Manual de policía urbana (Madrid: E. de la Riva, 1887) (Manual of urban policing)
- Tratado de derecho administrativo español (Madrid: E. de la Riva, 1888) (Treatise on Spanish administrative law)
- Manual teórico-practico de lo contencioso-administrativo y del procedimiento especial en los asuntos de hacienda (Manual of theoretical and practical administrative disputes and the special procedure in matters of finance).
- Derecho administrativo provincial y municipal, o Tratado general teórico-práctico de las atribuciones de las Diputaciones provinciales y de los Ayuntamientos en todos los ramos que por las leyes les están encomendados (Provincial and municipal administrative law or theoretical and practical General Treaty as regards the powers of the provinces and municipalities in all fields that are entrusted under them by law).
- Manual enciclopédico teórico-práctico de los Juzgados municipales (Madrid: E. de la Riva, 1887)(Theoretical and practical encyclopedic manual of municipal courts).
- Manual de formularios para todos los juicios civiles : ajustados a la Ley de Enjuiciamiento de 3 de febrero de 1881 reformada por la de 11 de mayo de 1888.., Ebook (Madrid: E. de la Riva, 1888)
- El libro de los alcaldes y los ayuntamientos (Book of mayors and city councils).

== Honours ==
- Knight Grand Cross of the Order of Charles III
- Knight Grand Cross of the Order of Isabella the Catholic
- Knight Commander of the Order of St Gregory the Great
- Knight Grand Cross of the Order of St Michael of Bavaria
- Knight Grand Cross of the Order of the Crown of Prussia
