= Pablo Esquert =

Flemish painter

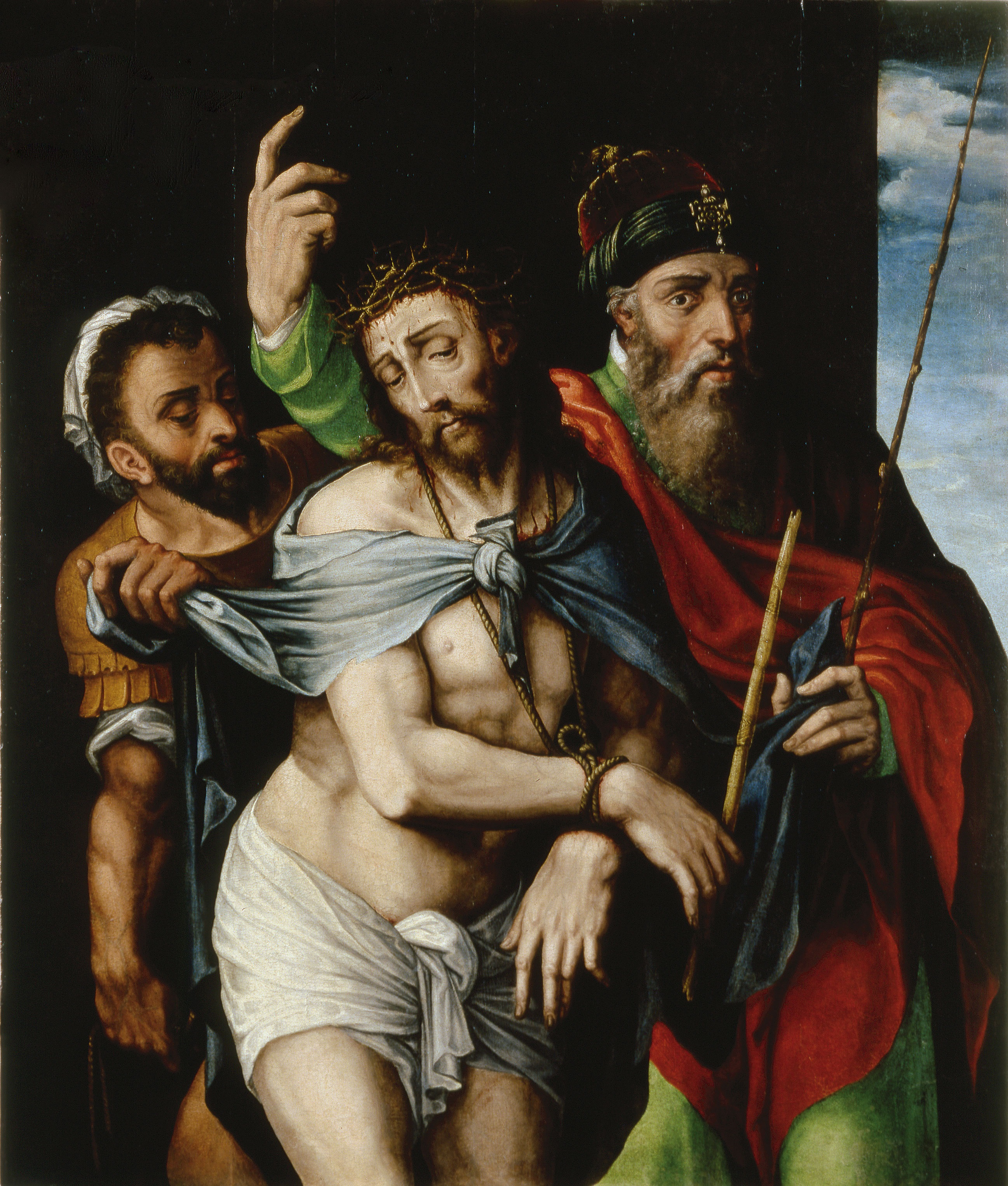
Ecce Homo, oil on panel, Bilbao Fine Arts Museum.

Pablo Esquert (active 1559 - 1575) was a Flemish painter summoned to Zaragoza in Spain by Martín de Gurrea y Aragón, Duke of Villahermosa. He was also known as Pablo Schepers, Scheppers, Eschepers, Paul Esquarte, Pablo de Ezchepers, Paulo de Ezchepers and Micer Pablo. Working in both Italy and Spain, Esquert gained wealth and renown with his skills, especially in creating copies of famous works. He was well known for creating copies of paintings by Titian, specifically painted in a Flemish style known as "delgada y muy gentil".

Esquert's father was a painter, Pauwels Scepers, who resided in Mechelen. Esquert eventually married Catalina van Steynemolen, the daughter of painter Jan van Steynemolen.
