= Pedrola =

Coordinates: 41°47′N 1°13′W

- municipality
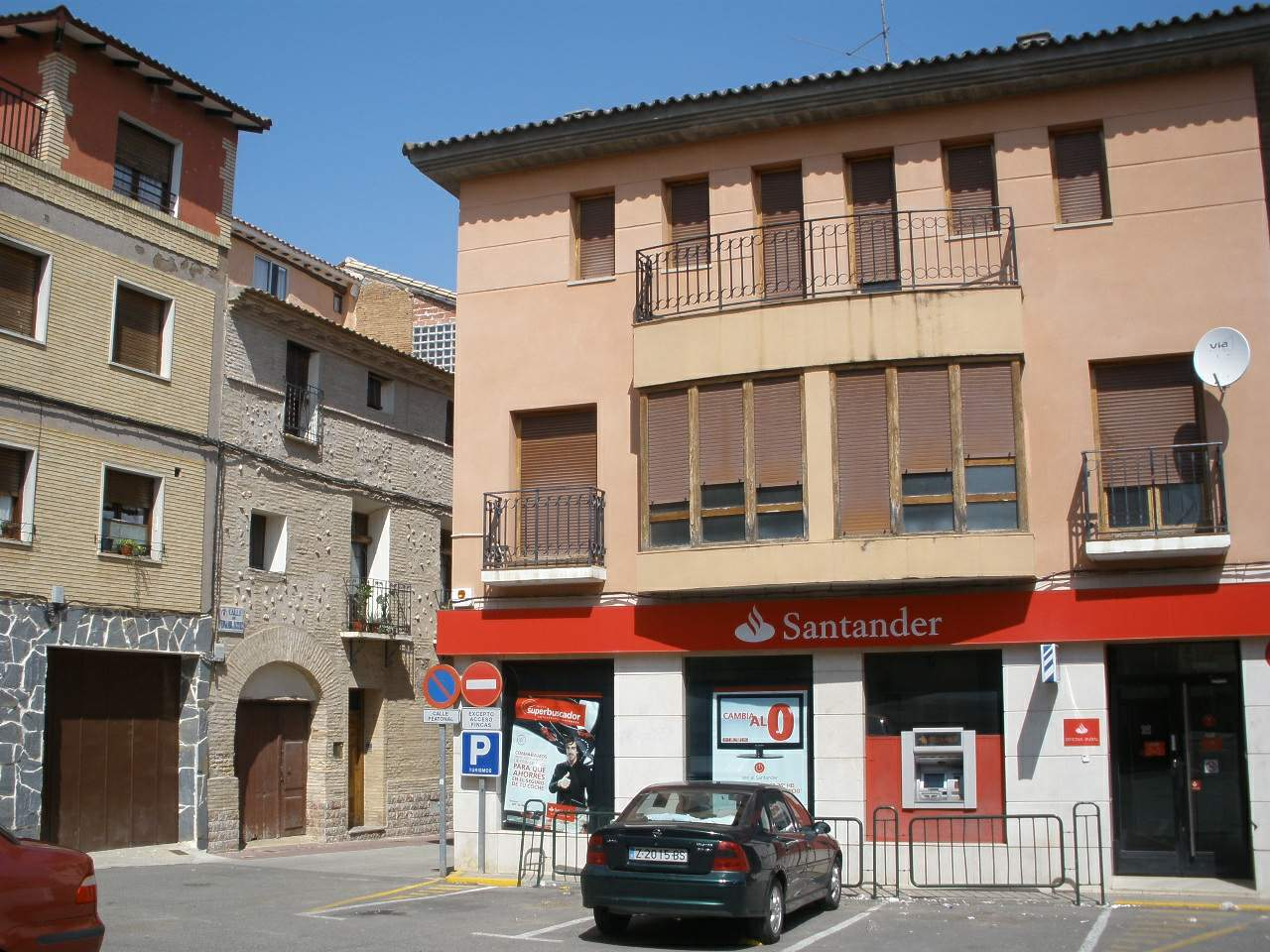

- Flag Coat of arms
- Interactive map of Pedrola
- Country: Spain
- Autonomous community: Aragon
- Province: Zaragoza

Area
  - Total: 113 km^{2} (44 sq mi)

Population (2025-01-01)
  - Total: 3,842
  - Density: 34.0/km^{2} (88.1/sq mi)
- Time zone: UTC+1 (CET)
  - Summer (DST): UTC+2 (CEST)

Pedrola is a municipality located in the province of Zaragoza, Aragon, Spain. According to the 2004 census (INE), the municipality has a population of 2,906 inhabitants.

== Notable people ==
- Fermín Abella y Blave, (1832–1888) Spanish writer and jurist

== See also ==
- List of municipalities in Zaragoza
