= Juan José Omella =

Spanish prelate of the Catholic Church (born 1946)

His Eminence Juan José Omella y Omella
- Cardinal; Metropolitan Archbishop Emeritus of Barcelona
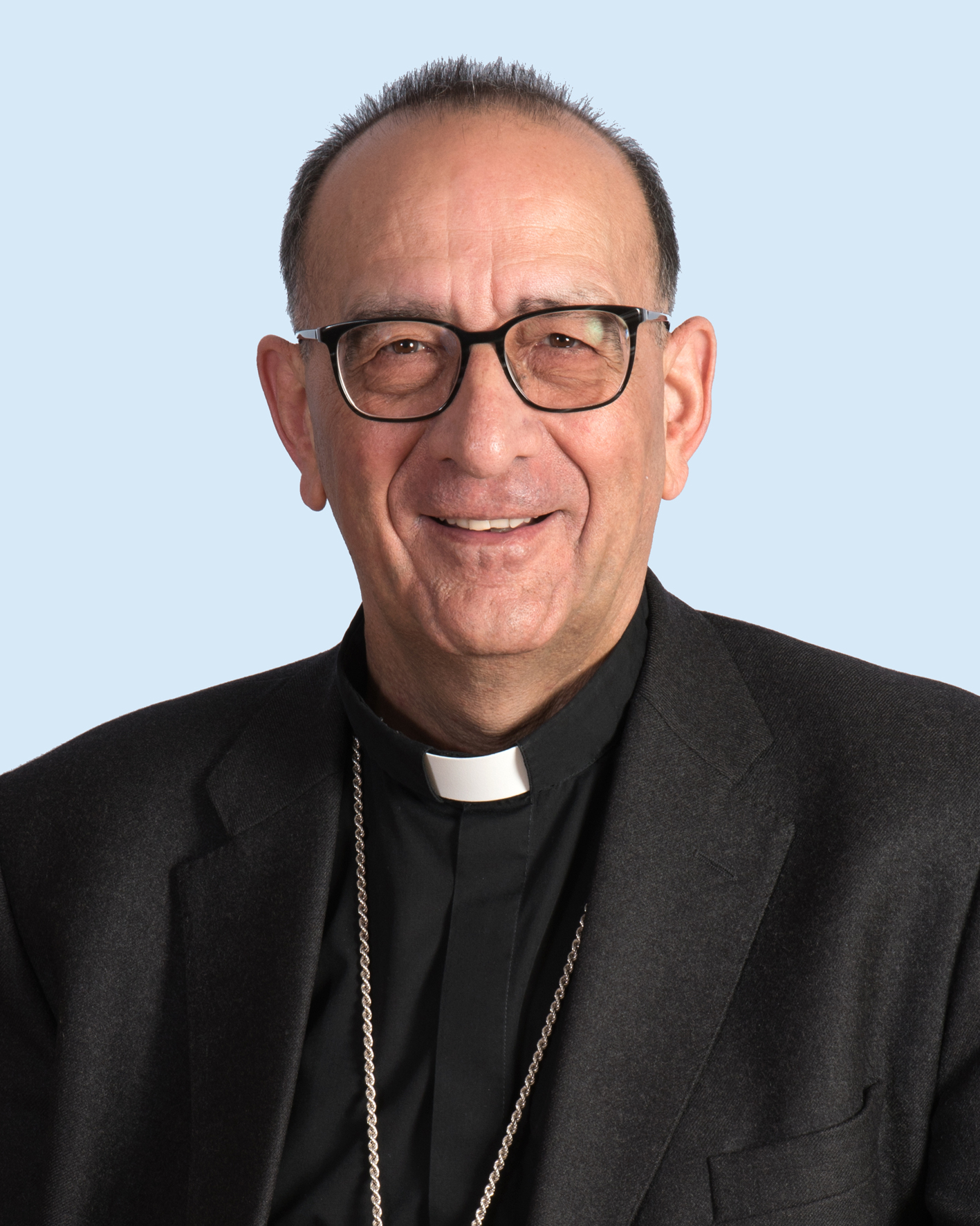
- Juan José Omella in 2017
- Archdiocese: Barcelona
- See: Barcelona
- Appointed: 6 November 2015
- Installed: 26 December 2015
- Term ended: 11 November 2026
- Predecessor: Lluís Martínez Sistach
- Successor: Octavi Vilà Mayo
- Other posts: Cardinal-Priest of Santa Croce in Gerusalemme (2017–); President of the Spanish Episcopal Conference (2020–2024)
- Previous posts: Titular Bishop of Sasabe (1996–99); Auxiliary Bishop of Zaragoza (1996–99); Bishop of Barbastro-Monzón (1999–2004); Bishop of Calahorra y La Calzada-Logroño (2004–15)

Orders
- Ordination: 20 September 1970
- Consecration: 22 September 1996 by Elías Yanes Álvarez
- Created cardinal: 28 June 2017 by Pope Francis
- Rank: Cardinal-Priest

Personal details
- Born: Juan José Omella y Omella; 21 April 1946 (age 80) Cretas, Teruel, Spain
- Denomination: Roman Catholic
- Motto: Per viscera misericordiae Dei nostri (Por la entrañable misericordia de nuestro Dios) (Through the tender mercy of our God)
- Signature: Juan José Omella y Omella's signature

- Coat of arms: Juan José Omella y Omella's coat of arms

Styles of Juan José Omella y Omella
- Reference style: His Eminence
- Spoken style: Your Eminence
- Religious style: Archbishop
- Informal style: Cardinal

Juan José Omella y Omella (also Joan Josep; (Note: His name is rendered differently according to the language used.: Catalan: Joan Josep Omella i Omella, Cretas dialect: [dʒuˈaɲ dʒuˈzɛp oˈmeʎaj oˈmeʎa], Barcelona dialect: [ʒuˈaɲ ʒuˈzɛp uˈmɛʎəj uˈmɛʎə].; Spanish: Juan José Omella (y) Omella, Madrid dialect: [ˈxwaŋ xoˈse oˈmeʎa(j) oˈmeʎa].; His official biography prefers the Catalan version.) born 21 April 1946) is a Spanish prelate of the Roman Catholic Church. He served as the metropolitan archbishop of Barcelona from December 2015 until November 2026 and has been a cardinal since 28 June 2017. He was the president of the Episcopal Conference of Spain from 2020 to 2024. He was auxiliary bishop of Zaragoza (1996–1999), bishop of Barbastro-Monzón (1999–2004), and bishop of Calahorra y La Calzada-Logroño (2004–2015). He is a member of the Council of Cardinals.

== Biography ==
Omella was born on 21 April 1946 in the municipality of Cretas in Teruel. His father was a farmer and his mother a seamstress. One of his sisters still lives there, while the other died at a young age.

The village priest convinced him to enter the seminary of Zaragoza. He studied at education centres for missionaries in Logroño, Leuven, and Jerusalem as well. On 20 September 1970 he was ordained a priest. He then worked for the church in rural areas of the Zaragoza diocese for 20 years, interrupted by one year's service as a missionary in Zaire. He was episcopal vicar of the Zaragoza diocese from 1990 to 1996.

Pope John Paul II appointed him auxiliary bishop of Zaragoza on 15 July 1996 and he was consecrated a bishop on 22 September by Elías Yanes Álvarez, Metropolitan Archbishop of Zaragoza.

John Paul II named him bishop of Barbastro-Monzón on 27 October 1999, and he was installed there on 12 December. He was also apostolic administrator of Huesca and of Jaca from 2001 to 2003. On 8 April 2004 he was named bishop of Calahorra and La Calzada-Logroño. He took possession of the diocese on 29 May.

He has been a member of the Commission of Social Ministry of the Spanish Episcopal Conference since 1996 and president of that commission from 2002 to 2008 and from 2014 to 2017. On 6 November 2014, Pope Francis appointed him a member of the Congregation for Bishops. According to El Periodico, Omella engineered the November 2014 early retirement of Manuel Ureña Pastor as Metropolitan Archbishop of Zaragoza, whom the local press later reported had mishandled a charge of harassment against one of his priests.

On 6 November 2015, Pope Francis appointed Omella as the Metropolitan Archbishop of Barcelona. He was installed there on 26 December.

On 21 May 2017, Pope Francis announced plans to make him a cardinal at a consistory scheduled for 28 June 2017. El Diario said the appointment made clear that Pope Francis's preferred representatives in Spain were Omella and Carlos Osoro, the Metropolitan Archbishop of Madrid, whom Francis made a cardinal in 2016, and not the recently elected leadership of the Spanish Episcopal Conference, perceived as more conservative. It noted that Omella's appointment to the Congregation for Bishops positioned him to influence the future of church leadership in Spain. It cited as well his pastoral letters on social issues and ties to Manos Unidas, an organization that focuses on the problems of developing nations. At the 28 June consistory, he gave the address to the Pope on behalf of the cardinals-designate. He was assigned to the order of cardinal priests with the title of Santa Croce in Gerusalemme.

Following the 2017-18 Spanish constitutional crisis the Catalan government suggested that Omella and the Abbot of Montserrat should act as mediators between the region and Spanish authorities.

Francis made him a member of the Congregation for Bishops and of the Supreme Tribunal of the Apostolic Signatura on 23 December 2017.

He participated in the 2018 Synod of Bishops on Youth, Faith, and Vocational Discernment as one of three elected representatives of the Spanish Episcopal Conference. At the conclusion of that Synod he was elected one of three European members of the Ordinary Council for the next Synod, and he participated in that capacity in the Synod on Synodality that met in 2023 and 2023. He was elected to a four-year term as president of the Spanish Episcopal Conference in 2020.

In 2021, upon reaching the age of 75, he submitted his resignation as archbishop of Barcelona to Pope Francis as required.

Omella is the co-author, with Miguel Pothoes Mombiela and José María Navarro, of La aurora de Calanda, una antigua institución, published in 1991.

On 7 March 2023, Pope Francis appointed him to the Council of Cardinal Advisors.

Some analysts have questioned Omella's leadership in the Spanish Church, particularly his handling of internal clerical dynamics.

Omella has also been identified by journalists as a key figure in a series of alleged clandestine operations within the Spanish Church, working closely with Jesuit priest Germán Arana to influence episcopal appointments and internal Church politics.

He participated as a cardinal elector in the 2025 papal conclave that elected Pope Leo XIV.

On 11 November 2026, Pope Leo XIV accepted his letter of resignation and appointed Bishop Octavi Vilà Mayo to succeed him as the Metropolitan Archbishop.

== Notes ==
Catholic Church titles
Preceded by Joaquín Carmelo Borobia Isasa	Auxiliary Bishop of Zaragoza; 15 July 1996 – 29 October 1999	Succeeded by Alfonso Milián Sorribas
Preceded by Julián Barrio Barrio	— TITULAR — Titular Bishop of Sasabe; 15 July 1996 – 29 October 1999	Succeeded by Giacomo Guido Ottonello
Preceded by Ambrosio Echebarria Arroita	Bishop of Barbastro-Monzón; 29 October 1999 – 8 April 2004	Succeeded by Alfonso Milián Sorribas
Preceded by Ramón Búa Otero	Bishop of Calahorra y La Calzada–Logroño; 8 April 2004 – 6 November 2015	Succeeded by Carlos Escribano
Preceded by Lluís Martínez Sistach	Archbishop of Barcelona; 6 November 2015 – 11 November 2026	Succeeded by Octavi Vilá Mayo
Preceded by Miloslav Vlk	Cardinal-Priest of Santa Croce in Gerusalemme; 28 June 2017 –	Incumbent
Preceded by Ricardo Blázquez Pérez	President of Spanish Episcopal Conference; 3 March 2020 – 5 March 2024	Succeeded by Luis Javier Argüello García
