= Carlos Escribano =

Spanish Catholic archbishop (born 1964)

- Archbishop of Zaragoza
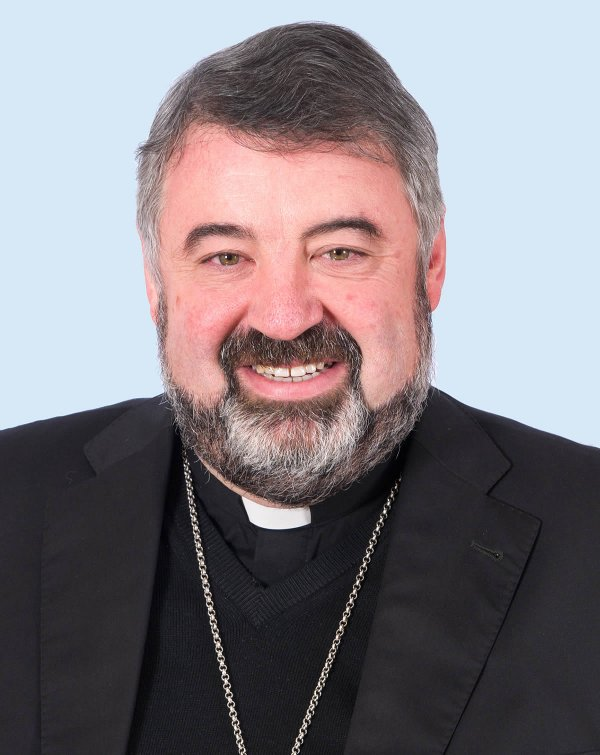
- Church: Catholic Church
- Archdiocese: Zaragoza
- Appointed: 6 October 2020
- Predecessor: Vicente Jiménez Zamora
- Previous posts: Bishop of Calahorra y La Calzada-Logroño (2016–2020), Bishop of Teruel and Albarracín (2010–2016)

Orders
- Ordination: 14 July 1996 by Elías Yanes Álvarez
- Consecration: 26 September 2010 by Antonio María Rouco Varela

Personal details
- Born: 15 August 1964 (age 61) Carballo, Spain
- Education: Pontifical Gregorian University, University of Zaragoza
- Motto: Quære primum Regnum Dei et iustitiam eius (Seek first the Kingdom of God and its justice)

- Coat of arms

Carlos Manuel Escribano Subías (born 15 August 1964) is a Spanish prelate of the Catholic Church, serving as Archbishop of Zaragoza since 2020. He was previously Bishop of Teruel and Albarracín (2010–2016) and Bishop of Calahorra y La Calzada-Logroño (2016–2020).

== Biography ==
Escribano was born in Carballo in Galicia due to his father's mining job, and was raised from the age of seven months in Monzón in Aragon. He studied business at the University of Zaragoza, and went on to work for local businesses.

Escribano went to seminary in Lleida, as Monzón was part of the Catalan city's dicocese until 1995. He graduated with a degree in moral theology from the Pontifical Gregorian University in 1996, being ordained a priest on 14 July that year.

On 20 July 2010, Escribano was named Bishop of Teruel and Albarracín by Pope Benedict XVI. He was ordained a bishop on 26 September at Teruel Cathedral by cardinal Antonio María Rouco Varela.

After Juan José Omella moved to become Archbishop of Barcelona, Escribano was named Bishop of Calahorra y La Calzada-Logroño on 13 May 2016. He took office at Calahorra Cathedral on 25 June.

On 6 October 2020, Escribano was named Archbishop of Zaragoza as Vicente Jiménez Zamora retired age 75. He took office on 21 November at the Cathedral-Basilica of Our Lady of the Pillar, in a ceremony reduced by COVID-19 pandemic protocols. On 29 June 2021, he was one of 36 new archbishops to be given their pallium by Pope Francis at St. Peter's Basilica.
