= Alfonso Milián Sorribas =

Spanish prelate (1939–2020)

The Most Reverend Alfonso Milián Sorribas
- Bishop of Barbastro-Monzón
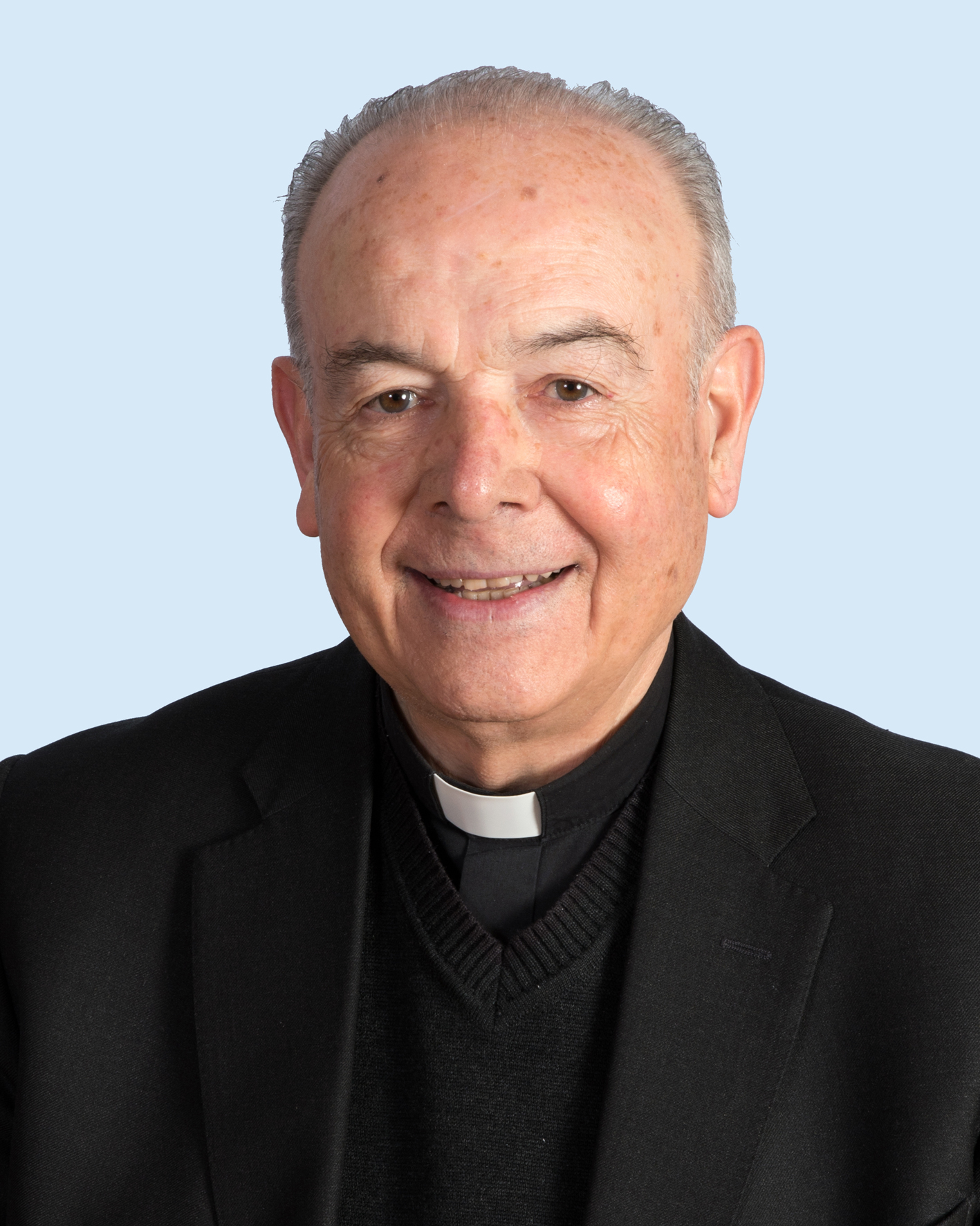
- Church: Catholic Church
- Installed: 2004
- Term ended: 2014
- Predecessor: Joan Josep Omella i Omella
- Successor: Ángel Javier Pérez Pueyo
- Previous post(s): Titular Bishop of Diana and Auxiliary Bishop of Zaragoza (2000–2004)

Orders
- Ordination: 25 March 1962
- Consecration: 3 December 2000 by Elías Yanes Álvarez

Personal details
- Born: 15 January 1939; La Cuba, Spain
- Died: 26 November 2020 (aged 81); Zaragoza, Spain
- Coat of arms

Alfonso Milián Sorribas (15 January 1939 – 26 November 2020) was a Spanish Roman Catholic bishop.

Milián Sorribas was born in Spain and was ordained to the priesthood in 1962. He served as titular bishop of Diana and as Auxiliary bishop of the Roman Catholic Archdiocese of Zaragoza, Spain, from 2000 to 2004 and as bishop of the Roman Catholic Diocese of Barbastro-Monzón, Spain, from 2004 to 2014.

Sorribas died from COVID-19 at the age of 81.
