= Bernardo Jiménez =

Bishop of Zaragoza (1138–1152)

- Bishop of Zaragoza
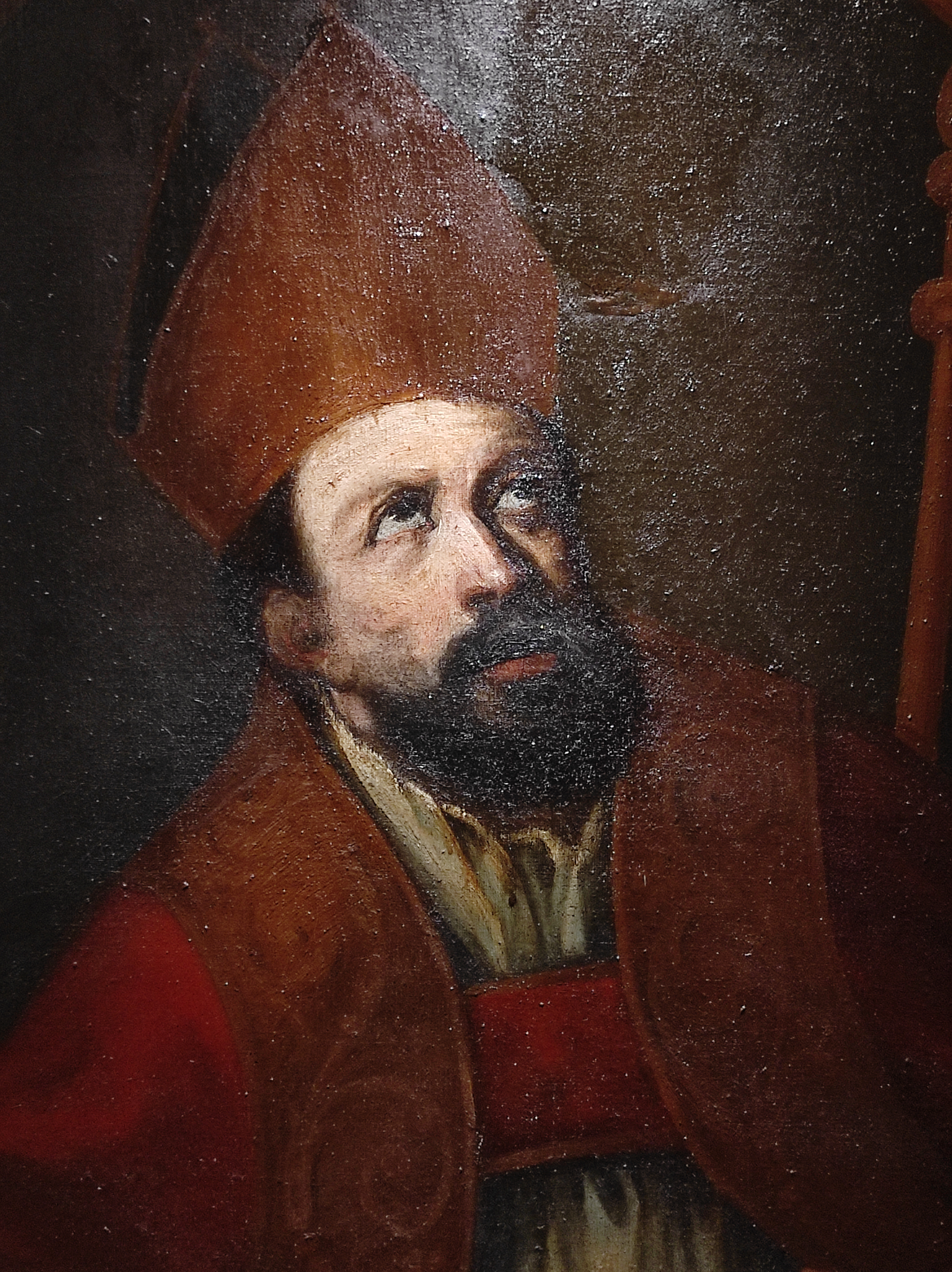
- Imaginary portrait attributed to Pablo Rabiella y Díez de Aux, 1693 (Wikimedia Commons).
- Church: Roman Catholic Church
- Diocese: Diocese of Zaragoza
- Appointed: 1138
- Term ended: 1152
- Predecessor: Guillermo (William) of Zaragoza
- Successor: Pedro Tarroja

Personal details
- Born: unknown Kingdom of Aragon
- Died: unknown

Bernardo Jiménez (also spelled Bernardo Ximénez) was a medieval Aragonese prelate who served as Bishop of Zaragoza between 1138 and 1152, in the decades following the Christian reconquest of Zaragoza in 1118.

== Biography ==
Jiménez was appointed bishop after the early death of his predecessor Guillermo (William). During his episcopate he consolidated the ecclesiastical structures of the restored diocese. Contemporary and early-modern sources attribute to him the organization of the cathedral chapters of both La Seo and the Pillar, the establishment of canonries, the distribution of diocesan church incomes between both chapters, and the introduction of the Augustinian rule among the canons.

He also oversaw the recovery for Zaragoza of the relics known as the Santas Masas and jurisdiction over the church of San Gil from the older diocese of Huesca.

Scholarly work on Zaragoza's hagiographic dossiers notes institutional developments affecting the Pillar during his tenure: the church of El Pilar attained collegiate status in 1138 and, a few years later, building campaigns were underway (1141).

Jiménez maintained good relations with the ruling house of Aragon–Barcelona. In 1149, Ramon Berenguer IV donated Albalate to the Zaragoza mitre, from which the later toponym Albalate del Arzobispo derives; the locality remained tied to the see for centuries.

== Resignation and death ==
In 1152 Jiménez resigned the bishopric and retired to the community of El Pilar in Zaragoza, where he lived as a monk. A necrological notice records his death on XIV kalendas Maii (fourteenth before the calends of May), the year being unknown.

== Legacy ==
Bernardo Jiménez is remembered as one of the organizers of the Zaragoza church in the first generation after 1118. His tenure framed the consolidation of the capitular institutions of both co-cathedrals and the early collegiate status of El Pilar.

== See also ==
- Archdiocese of Zaragoza
- Cathedral of the Savior of Zaragoza
- Basilica of Our Lady of the Pillar
- Ramon Berenguer IV, Count of Barcelona
- Albalate del Arzobispo
