= Life of the Virgin (Goya) =

Murals in oil by Francisco de Goya

The Birth of the Virgin (detail)
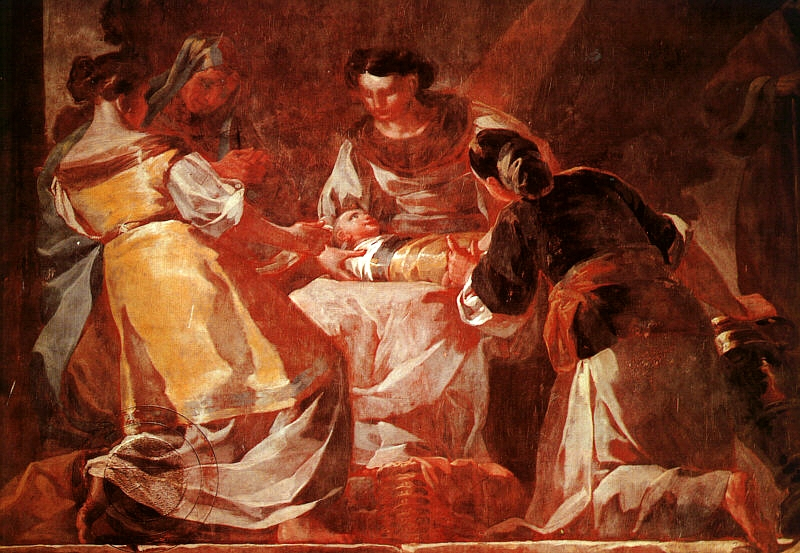
- Artist: Francisco Goya
- Year: 1774
- Type: Oil mural
- Dimensions: 306 cm × 790 cm (120 in × 310 in)
- Location: Charterhouse of Aula Dei; near Zaragoza

The Goya Murals in the Cartuja de Aula Dei (Ciclo pictórico de la Vida de la Virgen de la Cartuja del Aula Dei, 1774) are a cycle of mural paintings on the Life of the Virgin by Francisco de Goya, realised in secco (i.e., painted in oils directly onto the wall surface), in the church of the Charterhouse of Aula Dei (Spanish: Cartuja de Aula Dei) near Peñaflor de Gállego on the outskirts of Zaragoza, Aragon, Spain.

They were an important early commission for Goya, who was not yet thirty.

== History ==
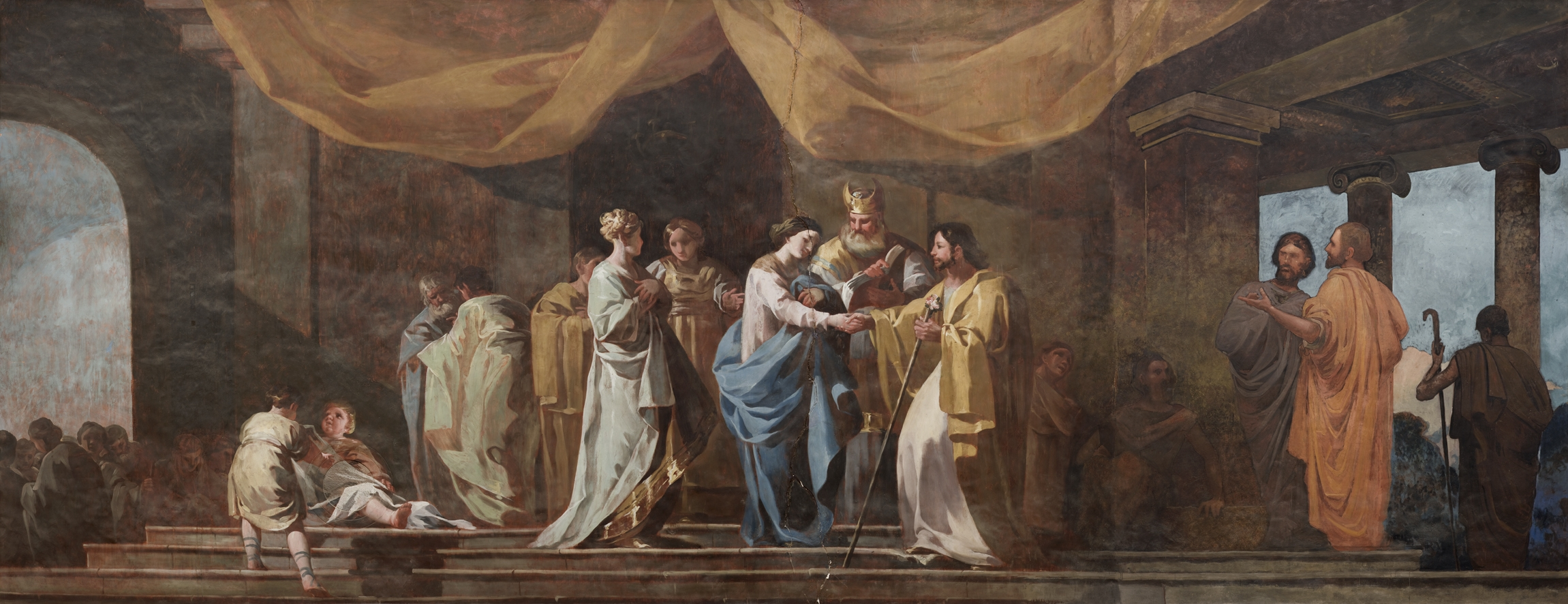
Marriage of the Virgin

After his return from a learning trip to Italy, Goya received various commissions for mural paintings. One was for the Basílica del Pilar in Zaragoza, where he painted the Adoration of the Name of God. Another, for the church of the Charterhouse of Aula Dei, where his brother-in-law Manuel Bayeu was a monk, was a series on the Life of the Virgin up to the Presentation of Jesus at the Temple, which he completed in 1774.

In this work, Goya showed his mastery of large-scale mural painting, handling scenes each measuring between five and ten metres in length and one to three metres in height, and between them covering the entire area of the interior walls of the Carthusian church.

Of the original eleven paintings there now remain only seven, as a result of damage consequent upon the abandonment of the monastery during the Desamortizacion, or dispossession of the church, by Juan Álvarez Mendizábal in 1835–37. The other four had to be re-painted, by the brothers Paul and Amedée Buffet in 1903, after the charterhouse was reacquired by the Carthusian Order for the accommodation of two exiled French Carthusian communities in 1901. The seven surviving pictures were also damaged by the years of neglect and exposure, and were restored in 1978–79.

== Description ==
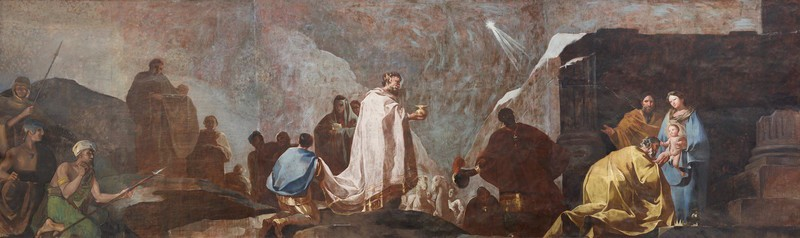
Adoration of the Magi

Goya began work in 1773 at the request of Brother Félix Salcedo and Brother José Lalana. The series consists of scenes from the life of the Virgin arranged in a frieze round the walls of the monastic church. The series begins with Joachim and Anne (Mary's parents) located above the main doors, and thereafter alternate between scenes from the Gospels and from the Epistles. Thus to the right the next picture is of the Birth of the Virgin, while to the left is the Marriage of the Virgin. There follow the Visitation of Mary to her cousin Elizabeth, the Circumcision, the Adoration of the Magi and finally, of what remains from Goya's original works, the Presentation of Jesus at the Temple.

== See also ==
- List of works by Francisco Goya
