= Maximus (bishop of Zaragoza) =

6th century Catholic bishop of Zaragoza, Hispania

Maximus was the first Visigothic bishop of Zaragoza (Hispania) in 592–619. He was also a theologian and historian.

He succeeded Simplicius of Zaragoza as Bishop and was influential in the conversion of the Visigothic Kings to Catholicism. He assisted at the Councils of Barcelona in 599 and Egara in 614, held the Second Council of Zaragoza, against Arianism, in 592, and signed a decree of Gundemar in 610.

Maximus also contributed to the Visigothic cultural renaissance of the 6th and 7th centuries, which was continued by such scholars as Isidore of Seville, Eugenius of Toledo and Braulio of Zaragoza. It has been theorized that he wrote the Chronicles of Zaragoza, a history of that time surviving via a 16th-century manuscript copy, because Isidore of Seville notes that Maximus had written on history. However, Collins (1980) and Johnson (1993) argue that the Chronicles were not the work of a single author.

Maximus was succeeded in his see by John, brother of Braulio of Zaragoza, who was in turn succeeded by Braulio; see, e.g., Collins (1995).
