= Ramón de Castellazuelo =

Ramón de Castellazuelo was a Bishop of Zaragoza between 1185 and 1216 AD.

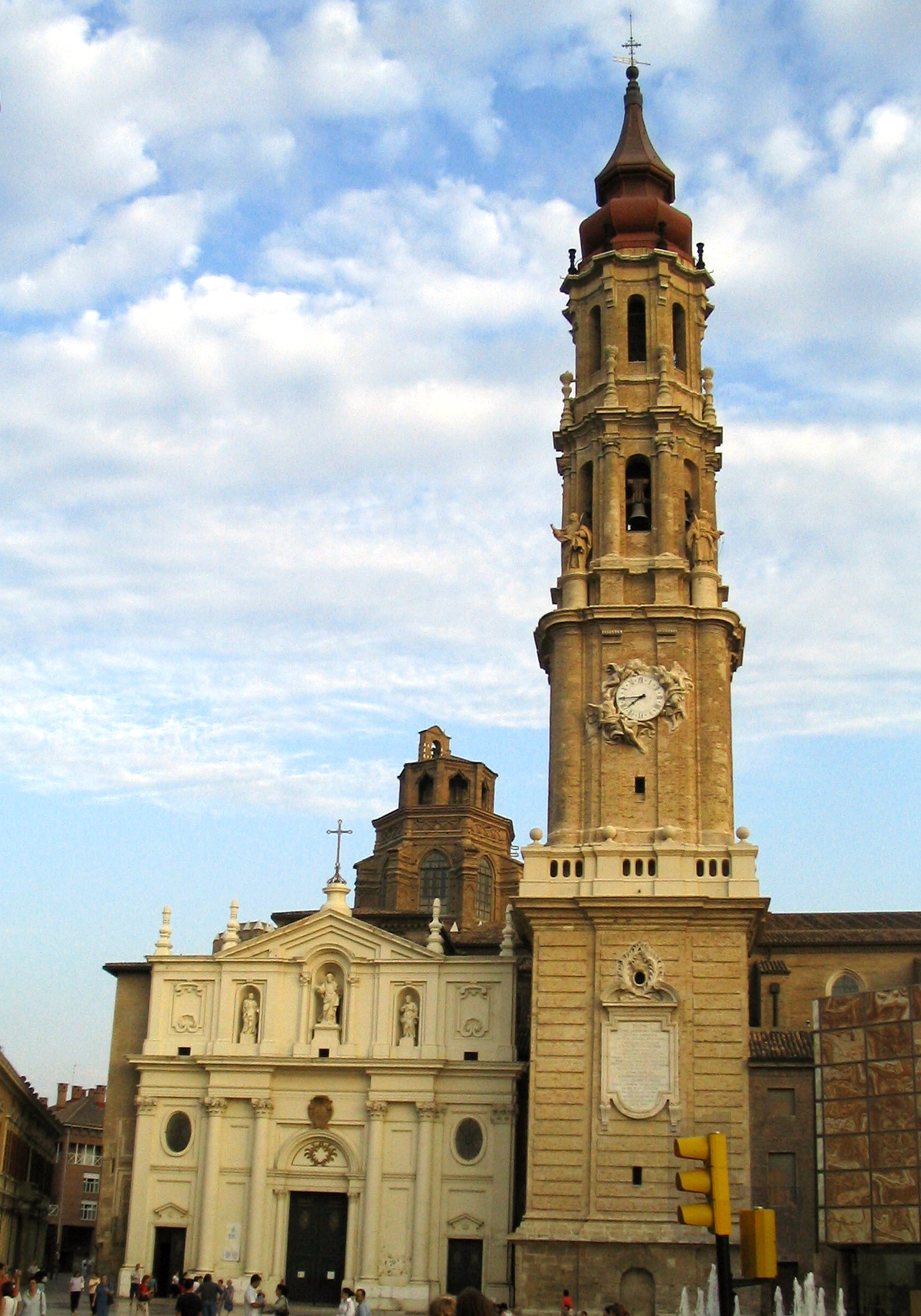
Co-Cathedral Basilica of Our Lady of the Pillar.

As Bishop, he continued construction on the Cathedral of Zaragoza which his predecessor Pedro Tarroja had begun. The project maintained the old mosque, converted into a church, but added it to a head, five apses and a doorway flanked by two square towers.

He accompanied King Pedro III of Aragon in the campaign against Rincón de Ademuz in 1212, participating in the Siege of Al-Dāmūs and Castellfabib.
