= Arnaldo de Peralta =

Aragonese statesman and bishop

Arnaldo de Peralta was a 13th-century Bishop of Zaragoza in Spain and Aragonese statesman. He was archdeacon of Lledó before being appointed a bishop. On 1 Jun 1243 he was appointed Bishop of Valencia, Spain and on 25 Aug 1248 was translated to the see of Zaragoza. He died Bishop of Zaragoza, July 1271.

== Career ==
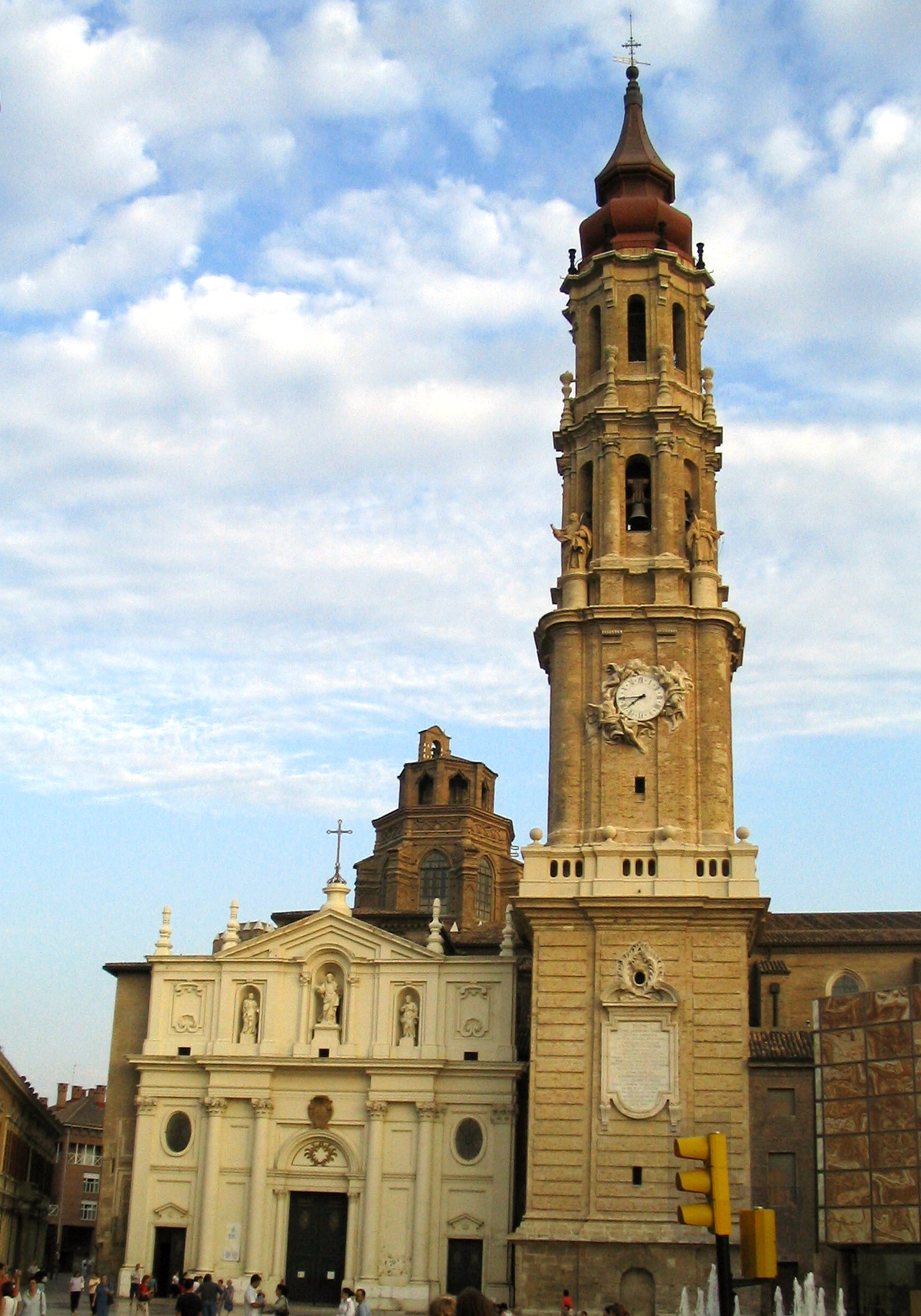
Co-Cathedral Basilica of Our Lady of the Pillar.

He was a vigorous and pragmatic church leader in a formative age for modern Spain and an era of slipping church control.

- He was Chancellor to James I of Aragon at the Treaty of Almizra, and was a key advisor to the King.
- He sought unsuccessfully to negotiate with the remaining Moors in Aragon.
- A shortage of clergy during his Bishopric led Arnaldo de Peralta to grant religious orders permission to receive bequests and sell burial spots in monasteries.
- He also endeavoured to protect church property, and the waiver of breaches of priestly celibacy by clerics.

He called a Synod early in his Bishopric and also attended the Council of Tarragona (May 1, 1246). He also built a number of churches, including a few on the site of former Mosques.

He was transferred to the bishopric of Zaragoza, on the death of Rodrigo de Ahonés (2-2-1248), and during his time here Saint Domingo de el Val (1243–1250), was martyred on 31 August 1250. Arnaldo de Peralta died in Zaragoza in July 1271, and was succeeded by Sancho de Peralta.

Catholic Church titles
| Preceded by Rodrigo de Ahonés | Archbishop of Zaragoza; 25 August 1248 – July 1271 | Succeeded by Sancho de Peralta |
| Preceded by Ferrer de Pallarés | Archbishop of Valencia; 1 June 1243 – 25 August 1248 | Succeeded by Andrés de Albalat |
Political offices
