= Siege of al-Dāmūs =

1210 siege during the Reconquista

Coordinates: 40°04′N 1°17′W

- Part of the Reconquista (Aragonese conquest of Valencia) and Almohad wars in the Iberian Peninsula
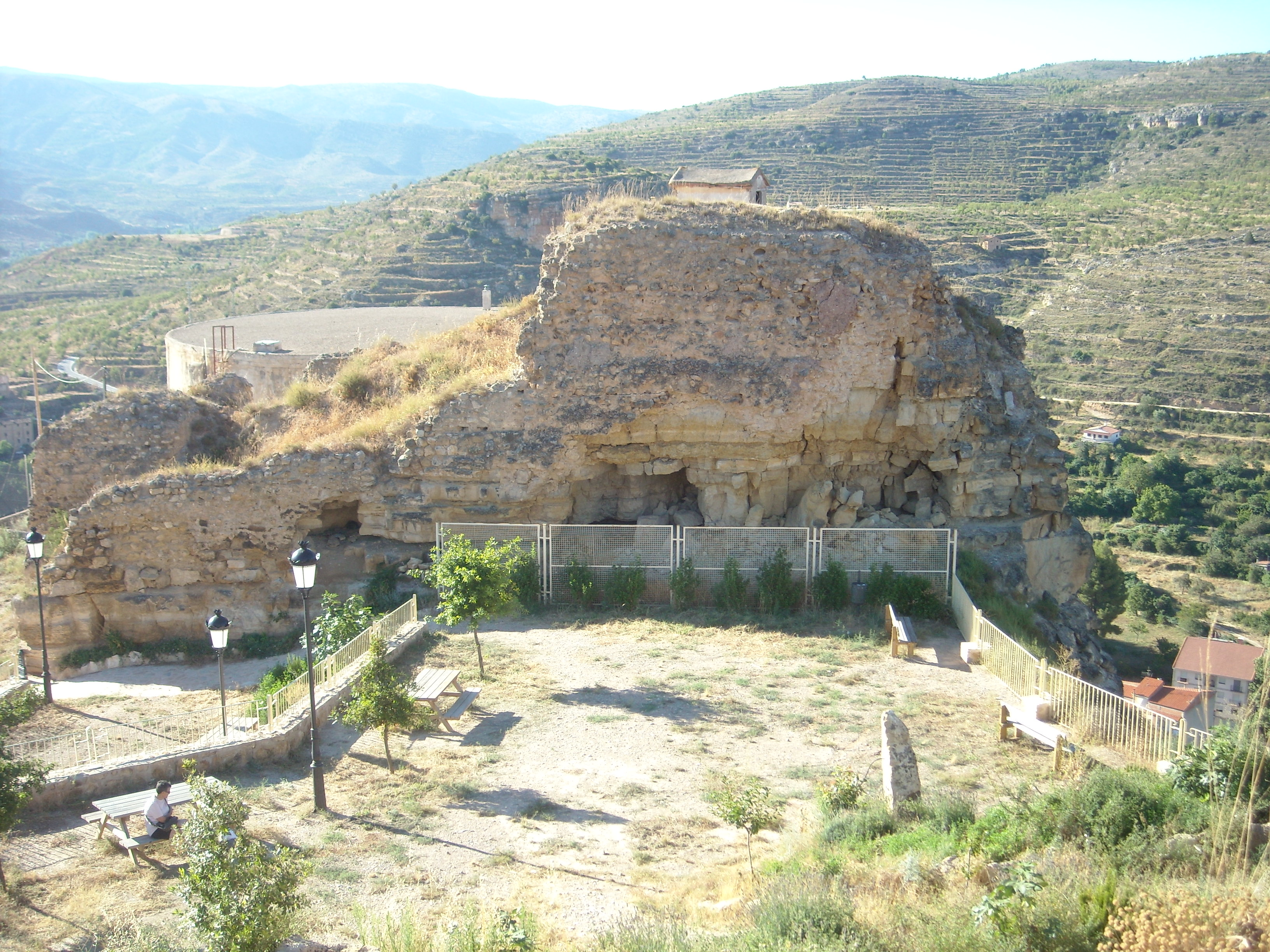
- The castle of al-Dāmūs
Date	1210
Location	Today Ademuz, Spain
Result	Christian victory
Territorial changes	Capture of the city by Christian forces

Belligerents
Crown of Aragon; Knights Hospitaller; Knights Templar	Almohad Caliphate

Commanders and leaders
Peter II of Aragon; Pedro de Montagut	Unknown

The Siege of al-Dāmūs was a battle of the Reconquista that occurred in the year 1210. The forces of the Kingdom of Aragon, together with auxiliary forces of the Knights Templar and Knights Hospitaller, were pitted against the defending forces of the Almohades. The Christian forces defeated the Muslim defenders. This battle was significant because in taking the castle at al-Dāmūs, the Christian forces riled their Muslim opponents to initiate a grand offensive that would eventually culminate in the Battle of Las Navas de Tolosa. This offensive, in turn, marked the end of the Islamic domination of the region and the beginning of Christian rule in the province.

== Background ==
Following the Almohad victory at Alarcos in 1195, truces between the Christians and the Muslims were put in place and the Almohads consolidated their control over southern and eastern al-Andalus, including Valencia. Despite the terms of the truces, raids, counter-raids, and conflicts over frontier fortresses persisted over the next fifteen years with neither side achieving decisive gains. A key transportation corridor in the frontier at the time was the Turia River Valley which linked the southern highlands of Aragon directly to the coastal plains of Valencia. The Almohad city and fortress at al-Dāmūs guarded the upper Turia River Valley as a part of a defensive perimeter protecting the eastern terrirories of Muslim al-Andalus. The potential loss of al-Dāmūs to the Argonese would be significant as it would open a strategic passageway to the Christians and put Valencia at risk.

In 1210, the truces between the Christian kingdoms and the Almohads expired and went unrenewed. At that time, King Peter II of Aragon sought papal support for offensive operations against the Almohads while King Alfonso VIII of Castile resumed campaigning in the west. Against this backdrop, Sayyid Abū l-ʿUlā, also known as Abubola the Elder, led a successful naval raid against the Christians along the Catalan coast. As a result, in March 1210, Peter II assembled an army and launched a major offensive directed at the upper Turia River Valley. Because of its strategic significance, al-Dāmūs became the immediate objective. Modern historians generally regard the raid of Sayyid Abū l-ʿUlā as the immediate catalyst for Peter II's offensive, but believe that the primary cause of the campaign was Peter II's longer-term strategic objectives relative to the frontier and the expiration of truces.

== Siege ==
The Almohad city and fortress at al-Dāmūs was a fortified settlement. Natural cliffs and a defensive curtain wall surrounded the city which was perched on the rocky slope of the Los Zafranares mountain with a commanding view of the Turia River. Inside the city walls, the castle of al-Dāmūs sat at the summit of the mountain in a position that dominated the city.

The Christian army attacking al-Dāmūs was led by Peter II, the King of Aragon. He was heavily reinforced by elite crusading elements from the Military Orders, specifically the Knights Templar and the Knights Hospitaller. Among the more prominent knights documented as participants in the siege were Ramón de Castellazuelo, Bishop of Zaragoza; García de Gúdal, Bishop of Huesca; García Frontin I, Bishop of Tarazona; Jimeno Cornel, Mayordomo of the King of Aragón; Artal II de Alagón, Alférez of the Kingdom of Aragón; Guillem Ramon III de Montcada, Seneschal of Catalonia; Guillem d'Òdena; and the Templar Pedro de Montagut. The exact numerical strength of this army is not recorded in surviving documents, however, it is likely that the total force numbered a few thousand.

Likewise, the exact number of Almohad soldiers stationed inside the al-Dāmūs compound is also unknown. The compliment likely consisted of professional border guards supplemented by local inhabitants who sought shelter within the city walls. Typical frontier outposts seldom maintained large permanent garrisons. As a result, it is likely that the defenders of al-Dāmūs numbered in the hundreds rather than the thousands. Again, there are no reliable sources in existence pertaining to the number of defenders of al-Dāmūs and any modern estimate should be considered as speculation.

With regard to the siege itself, granular descriptions of the engagement are not preserved in contemporary records. The length of the siege is uncertain. All that is recorded in surviving chronicles is that Peter II campaigned to the city; Peter II besieged the city; the city and castle fell; and Peter II continued his campaign ultimately capturing the neighboring frontier castles of Castielfabib, El Cuervo, and Serreilla.

== Aftermath ==
The siege of al-Dāmūs itself was not a decisive military event. Before the year ended, the Almohads recovered al-Dāmūs and Castielfabib by means of a counteroffensive. The importance of the battle lies in what it reveals.

The magnitude of Peter II's campaign demonstrates that in 1210, absent the renewal of armistice agreements, frontier conflict between the Christian kingdoms of al-Andalus and the Almohads was beginning to escalate. Following a trend beginning in the late 12th-century, the participation of Knights Hospitaller and Knights Templar also demonstrates that the manner in which Christian offensives were conducted was evolving. As opposed to ad hoc coal coalitions, the military forces available to the Christian kings were becoming more institutionalized. This gave the Christian kings military forces that were permanent, more experienced and independent from any single campaign.

The Almohad's defense and counteroffensive recapturing al-Dāmūs demonstrated that they still possessed a functioning frontier defense system in eastern al-Andalus. Notwithstanding the defensive network that the Almohads had in place, the magnitude and nature of the Christian offensives ultimately convinced Muslim officials in eastern al-Andalus that stronger intervention was needed from Morocco contributing to Caliph al-Nāṣir's expedition in 1212 culminating in the Battle of Las Navas de Tolosa.
