= Juan Soldevila y Romero =

Catholic cardinal (1843–1923)

His Eminence Juan Soldevila y Romero
- Cardinal, Archbishop of Zaragoza
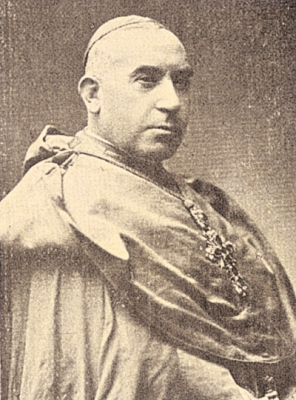
- Church: Roman Catholic
- Archdiocese: Zaragoza
- Installed: 1901
- Term ended: 4 June 1923
- Predecessor: Vicente Alda Sancho
- Successor: Rigoberto Doménech Valls
- Other post: Cardinal-Priest of Santa Maria del Popolo
- Previous post: Bishop of Tarazona (1889–1901)

Orders
- Ordination: 28 December 1867
- Consecration: 28 April 1889
- Created cardinal: 15 December 1919 by Benedict XV
- Rank: Cardinal-Priest

Personal details
- Born: 20 October 1843 Fuentelapeña, Spain
- Died: 4 June 1923 (aged 79) Zaragoza, Spain
- Buried: Basilica of Our Lady of the Pillar

Styles of Juan Soldevila y Romero
- Reference style: His Eminence
- Spoken style: Your Eminence
- Informal style: Cardinal
- See: Zaragoza

Juan Soldevila y Romero (29 October 1843 – 4 June 1923) was a Spanish Cardinal of the Roman Catholic Church who served as Archbishop of Zaragoza from 1901 until his death, and was elevated to the rank of cardinal in 1919.

== Biography ==
Juan Soldevila y Romero was born in Fuentelapeña, and studied at the seminaries in Valladolid and Toledo before being ordained to the priesthood on 28 December 1867. He obtained his doctorate in theology from the Central Seminary of Santiago de Compostela in 1868, and then studied canon law at the seminary in Tuy.

Soldevila served as a curate in three parishes in the Archdiocese of Valladolid, and became secretary to the Archbishop, Cesáreo Rodrigo y Rodríguez (1875), a cathedral canon (1883), and an archpriest (1887). Along with sitting on the Provincial Junta of Beneficence and on the Diocesan Junta for the Reconstruction of Churches, he was the Royal Preacher and a Knight of the Royal American Order of Isabel la Católica, a secretary capitular, and synodal examiner. In 1885, he was a member of the Junta for the assistance of victims of a cholera epidemic.

On 14 February 1889 Soldevila was appointed Bishop of Tarazona by Pope Leo XIII; during this time he became senator for that region. He received his episcopal consecration on the following April 28 from Archbishop Benito Sanz y Forés, with Bishops Mariano Alguacil y Fernández and Cesáreo Rodrigo y Rodríguez. Soldevila was Apostolic Administrator of Tudela from 1889 to 1901, and was promoted to Archbishop of Zaragoza on 16 December 1901.

Pope Benedict XV created him Cardinal Priest of Santa Maria del Popolo in the consistory of 15 December 1919. He received his cardinal's biretta from King Alphonse XIII on Christmas Day of that same year. Soldevila was one of the cardinal electors who participated in the 1922 papal conclave, which selected Pope Pius XI.

At age 79, Cardinal Soldevila was assassinated by the anarchist group Los Solidarios in Zaragoza. The apparent motive for the killing was revenge for the association of the Cardinal with the 'yellow' unions at a time of open violence between anarcho-syndicalists and pistoleros including the killing of anarchist leader Salvador Seguí. He is buried at the Basilica of Our Lady of the Pillar.

Catholic Church titles
| Preceded by Cosme Marrodán Rubio | Bishop of Tarazona; 1889–1901 | Succeeded by José Salvador y Barrera |
| Preceded by Antonio Cascajares y Azara | Archbishop of Zaragoza; 1901–1923 | Succeeded by Rigoberto Domenech y Valls |
