= Samaniego (surname) =

Samaniego is a surname. Notable people with this surname include:

== People ==
Listed alphabetically by given name within each section

=== Arts and entertainment ===
- Enrique Samaniego (1934–2005), Paraguayan harpist and composer
- Félix María de Samaniego (1745–1801), Spanish neoclassical fabulist writer
- Filoteo Samaniego (1928–2013), Ecuadorian novelist, poet, historian, translator, and diplomat
- Jorge Samaniego (1947–1987), Cuban-American dancer and choreographer
- José Ramón Gil Samaniego (1899–1968), Mexican actor best known as Ramon Novarro
- Joseph Ruiz Samaniego (fl. 1654–1670), music director at the Basilica of Our Lady of the Pillar in Zaragoza, Spain

=== Military ===
- José Antonio Manso de Velasco y Sánchez de Samaniego (1689–1767), Spanish soldier, 1st Count of Superunda, governor of Chile, and viceroy of Peru
- Juan de Samaniego y Xaca (fl 1653–1656), Spanish military officer and Governor of New Mexico
- Marcial Samaniego López (1910 – after 1983), Paraguayan general, author, and government official

=== Sports ===
- Adriano Samaniego (born 1963), Paraguayan football striker
- Daniel Torres Samaniego (born 1991), Mexican competition swimmer
- Danilo Samaniego (born 1964), Ecuadorian football player
- Estanislao Struway Samaniego (born 1968), Paraguayan soccer midfielder
- Roberto Durán Samaniego (born 1951), Panamanian professional boxer best known as Roberto Durán
- Santiago Samaniego (born 1974), Panamanian boxer
- Tyler Samaniego (born 1999), American baseball player

=== Other ===
- Diego González Samaniego (died 1611), Roman Catholic prelate who served as Bishop of Mondoñedo
- Jesús Adrián Rodríguez Samaniego (1975–2016), Mexican radio journalist
- Lilian Samaniego (born 1965), Paraguayan pharmaceutical chemist and politician

== See also ==
- Samaniego (disambiguation)
- Agatha Samaniego, fictional character in the Philippine television series Juan Happy Love Story played by Filipino actress Kim Domingo
