= Vicente Jiménez Zamora =

Spanish prelate of the Catholic Church (born 1944)

The Most Reverend Vicente Jiménez Zamora
- Archbishop Emeritus of Zaragoza
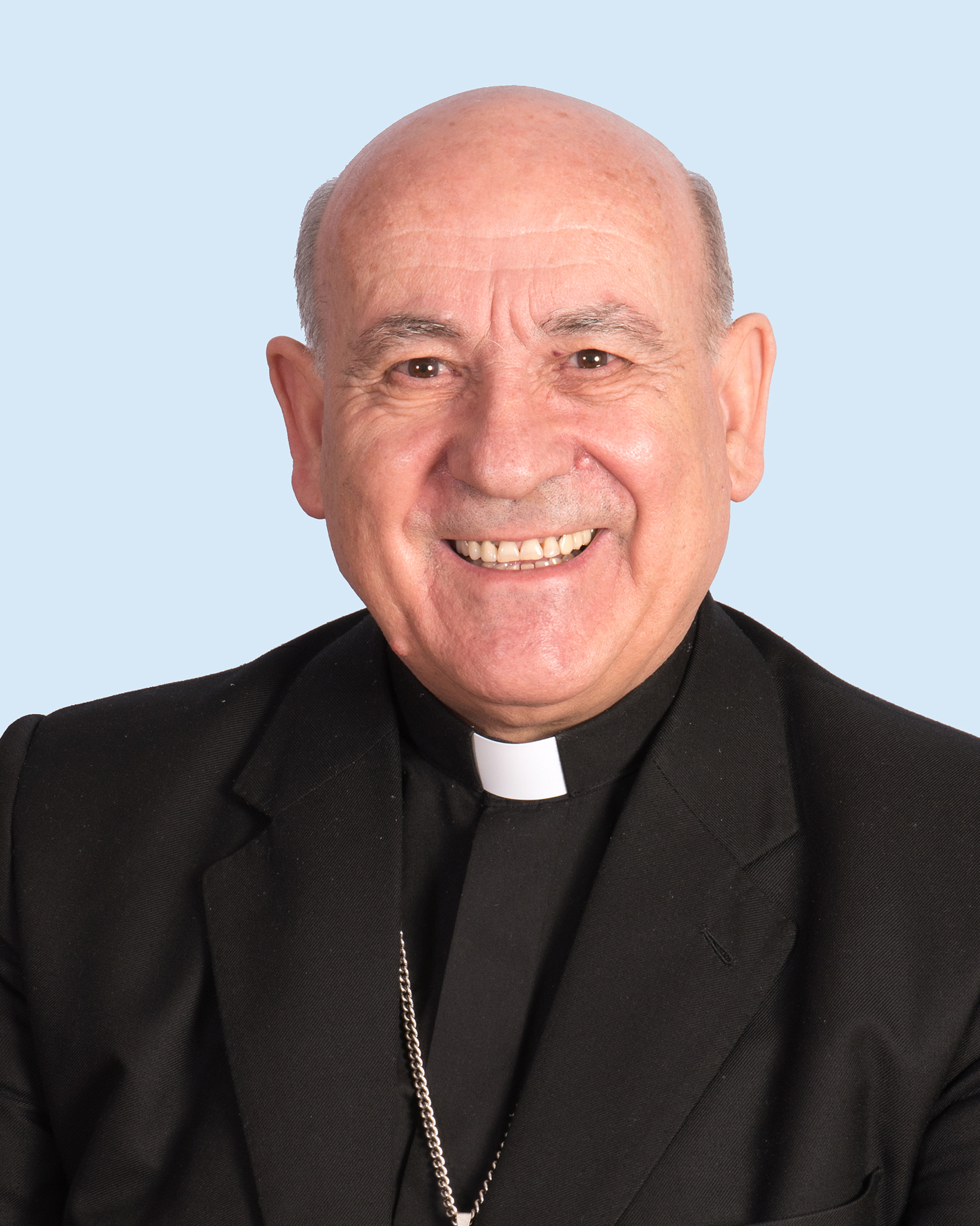
- Church: Roman Catholic Church
- Archdiocese: Zaragoza
- See: Zaragoza
- Appointed: 12 December 2014
- Installed: 21 December 2014
- Term ended: 8 October 2020
- Predecessor: Manuel Ureña Pastor
- Previous posts: Bishop of Osma-Soria (2004-07); Bishop of Santander (2007-14)

Orders
- Ordination: 29 June 1968 by Saturnino Rubio Montiel
- Consecration: 17 July 2004 by Manuel Monteiro de Castro

Personal details
- Born: Vicente Jiménez Zamora; 28 January 1944 (age 82) Ágreda, Soria, Spain
- Education: Pontifical University of Saint Thomas Aquinas; Pontifical Gregorian University; Alphonsian Academy
- Motto: Amoris officium

- Coat of arms

Vicente Jiménez Zamora (born 28 January 1944) is a Spanish prelate of the Catholic Church who has been the Archbishop of Zaragoza from 2014 to 2020. He was Bishop of Osma-Soria from 2004 to 2007 and Bishop of Santander from 2007 to 2014.

== Biography ==
He was born Ágreda, Soria, on 28 January 1944. He graduated with a degree in philosophy from the Pontifical University of Saint Thomas Aquinas, in dogmatic theology from the Pontifical Gregorian University, and specialized in moral theology at the Alphonsian Academy. (1964-1966) and Rome.

From 1970 to 1974 he was professor at the Diocesan Seminary of the Burgo de Osma, Soria (1974-1988) and was priest in several parishes of Soria and acted as Diocesan Director of education (1978-1985), Diocesan delegate of the clergy (1985-1992), vicar Pastoral (1988-1993), episcopal Vicar for the Diocesan Synod (1994-1998), Canon of the Cathedral of Soria and the Diocesan School of theology Professor.

He was appointed vicar general of the Diocese of Osma-Soria in 2001. On 21 May 2004, Pope John Paul II named him bishop of that diocese. He took possession on 17 July 2004.

On 27 July 2007, Pope Benedict XVI appointed him Bishop of Santander. He was installed there on 9 September.

On 29 March 2014, Pope Francis named him a member of the Congregation for institutes of consecrated life and societies of apostolic life.

On 12 December 2014, Francis appointed him Archbishop of Zaragoza. He was installed there on 21 December.

On 8 October 2020, he retired as Archbishop Emeritus of Zaragoza, while Carlos Manuel Escribano Subías was appointed as his successor as Archbishop.
