= Samaniego =

Samaniego may refer to:

== People ==
- Samaniego (surname), includes a list of notable people with the name

== Places ==
- Samaniego, Nariño, a town and municipality in the Nariño Department, Colombia
- Samaniego, Spain, a town and municipality in Araba (Álava), Basque Country, Spain
- Villar de Samaniego, a village and municipality in Salamanca, Spain
