= Simplicius of Zaragoza =

Simplicio of Zaragoza was a 6th-century Bishop of Zaragoza. He was consecrated about 586AD, after the death of the Visigoth King Liuvigild.

He attended the Council of Toledo, (589AD). Some authors also make him a participant in the second Council of Zaragoza (592AD), where there is a mention of Bishop Simplicio de Urgell. Others bring forward his entry into the diocese to 584 attributing to him a role in the conversion of King Leovigild to Catholicism.
