= Valerus =

Spanish bishop of Zaragoza

Valerus was a bishop of Zaragoza (Spain) in c. 277 AD.
