= Fuentelapeña =

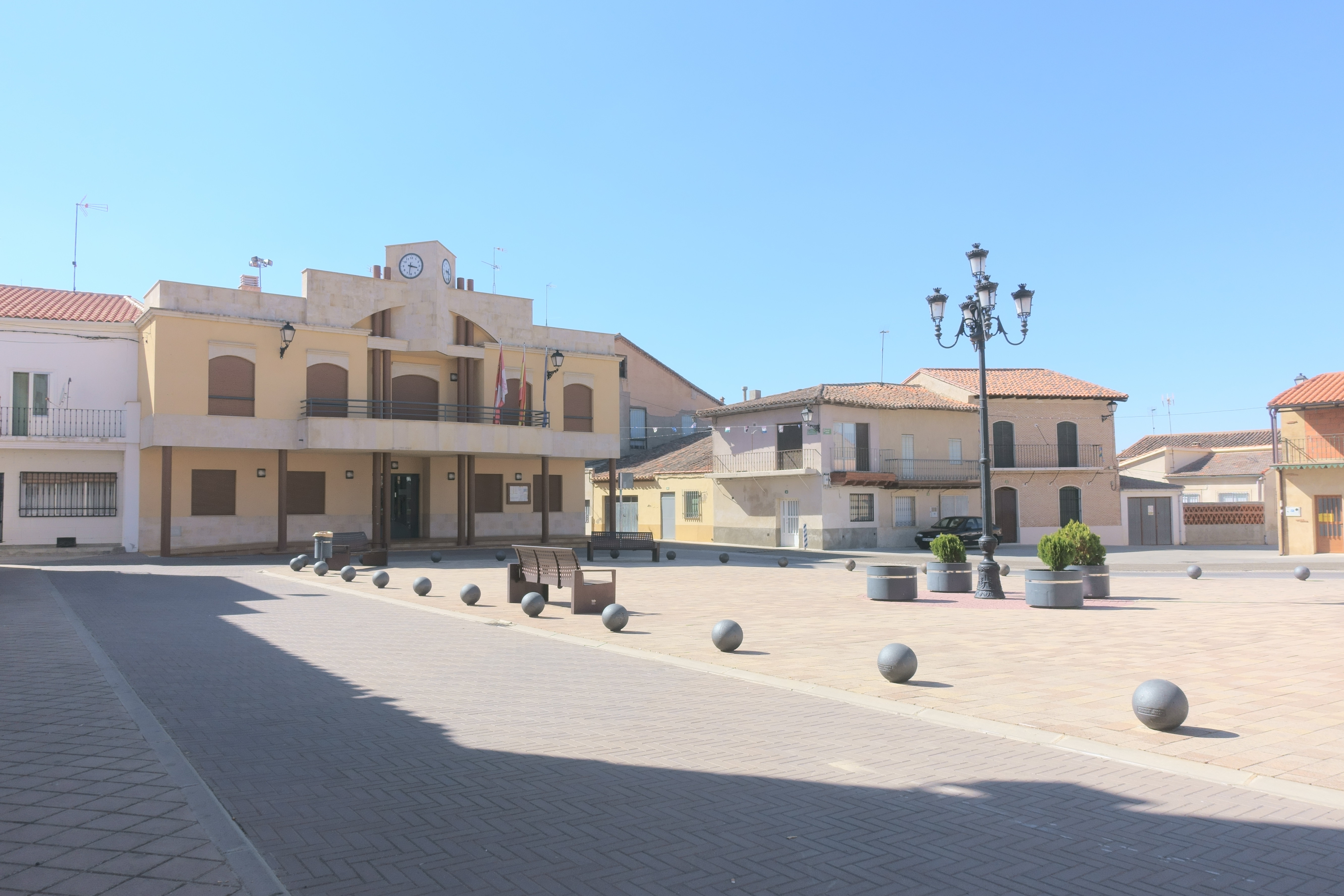

- Coat of arms

- Location within Castile and León Location within Spain
- Coordinates: 41°15′N 5°23′W
- Country: Spain
- Autonomous community: Castile and León
- Province: Zamora
- Municipality: Fuentelapeña

Area
  - Total: 58 km^{2} (22 sq mi)

Population (2025-01-01)
  - Total: 589
  - Density: 10/km^{2} (26/sq mi)
- Time zone: UTC+1 (CET)
  - Summer (DST): UTC+2 (CEST)

Fuentelapeña is a municipality located in the province of Zamora, Castile and León, Spain. According to the 2009 census (INE), the municipality has a population of 858 inhabitants.

An annual tradition in Fuentelapena is the fire-branding of the new cattle – consisting of the ranch's identifying mark, the number "6", and the number of cows held by that ranch that year.

== Notable residents ==
- Juan Soldevila y Romero (1843-1923) Catholic Cardinal
