= Ambrosio Echebarria Arroita =

Spanish Roman Catholic bishop

Ambrosio Echebarría Arroita
- Bishop of Barbastro-Monzón
- Native name: Ambrosio Etxebarria Arroita
- Church: Catholic Church
- Diocese: Diocese of Barbastro-Monzón
- In office: 23 September 1974 – 29 October 1999
- Predecessor: Damián Iguacén Borau
- Successor: Juan José Omella

Orders
- Ordination: 29 June 1947
- Consecration: 24 November 1974 by José López Ortiz

Personal details
- Born: 1 April 1922 Zeberio, Basque Provinces, Kingdom of Spain
- Died: 6 December 2010 (aged 88)

Ambrosio Echebarría Arroita (1 April 1922 – 6 December 2010) was the Roman Catholic bishop of the Roman Catholic Diocese of Barbastro-Monzón, Spain.

Ordained in 1947, Echebarría Arroita was named bishop of the diocese in 1974 and retired in 1999.
