= Ramón de Castrocol =

Spanish bishop

Remon Castrocol was Bishop of Zaragoza between 1201 and 1216.

In 1205 he gave gifts to the villages of Daroca (Forcallo, Fussed, Tramasaguas). On June 13, 1210, he signed an agreement with Gombal, Bishop of Tortosa demarcating the limits with the Diocese of Tortosa, Calaceite, Lledo, Arens de Lledó and Algars in Tortosa.

He died in 1216 AD.
