= Joseph Ruiz Samaniego =

Spanish composer

Joseph Ruiz Samaniego (fl. 1654–1670) was maestro de capilla at the Basilica of Our Lady of the Pillar in Zaragoza. His surviving works include Latin psalms and villancicos.

== Works, editions and recordings ==
- Salmo de difuntos - Verba mea auribus percipe Domine
- Vísperas. Estudio y transcripción de Luis Antonio González Marín, Barcelona, 1999. Vol. LVIII.
