= Adoration of the Name of God =

Fresco painting by Francisco de Goya

- Adoración del nombre de Dios (Spanish)
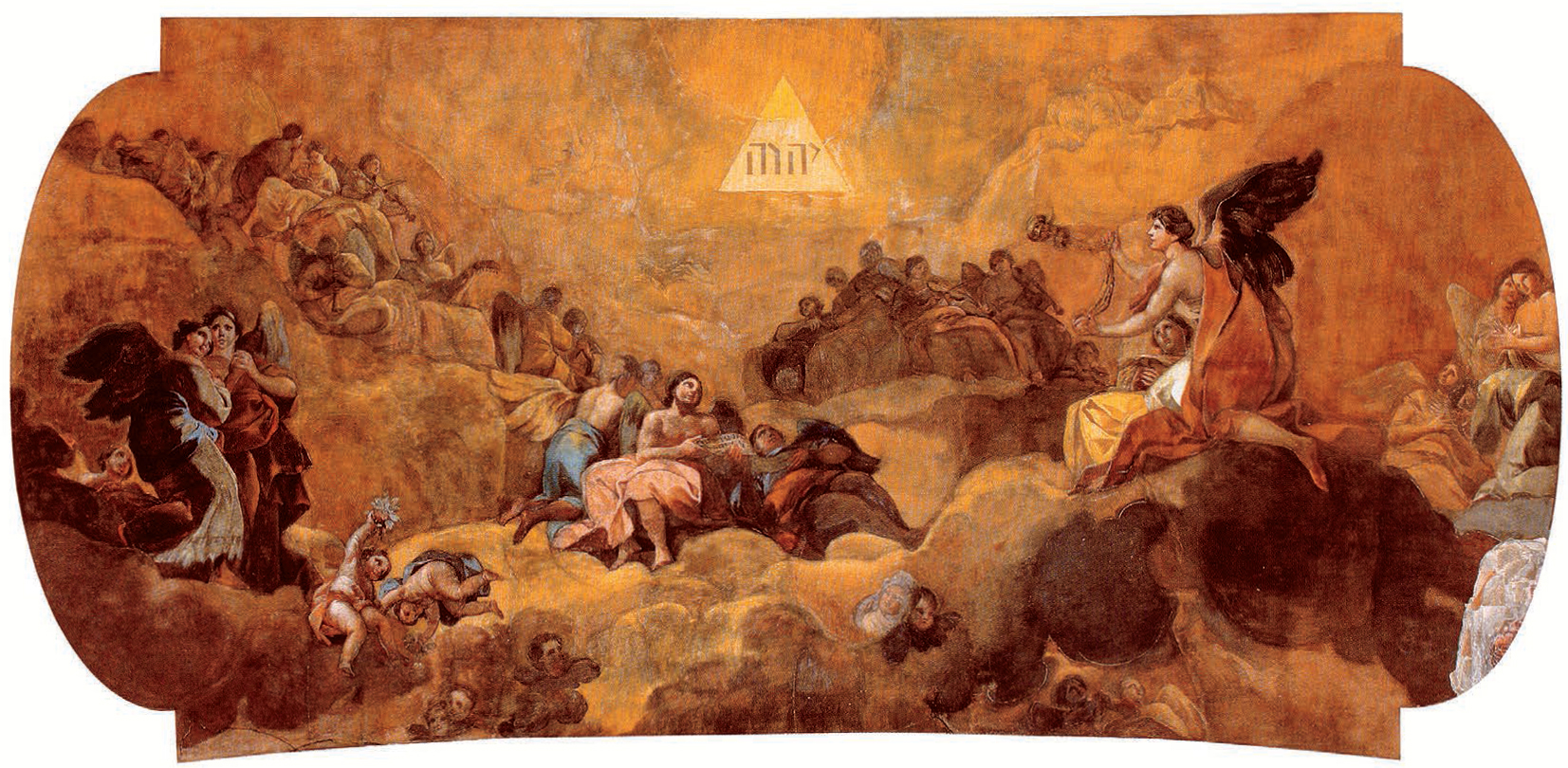
- Artist: Francisco Goya
- Year: 1772
- Type: Oil ceiling fresco
- Dimensions: 700 cm × 1500 cm (280 in × 590 in)
- Location: Basílica del Pilar; Zaragoza

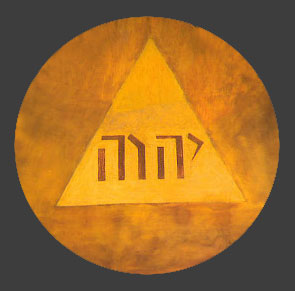
Francisco Goya: "The Name of God", YHWH in triangle, fresco detail.

The Adoration of the Name of God (Spanish: Adoración del nombre de Dios) or The Glory (Spanish: La gloria) (1772) is a fresco painted by Francisco Goya on the ceiling of the cupola over the Small Choir of the Virgin in the Basílica de Nuestra Señora del Pilar in Zaragoza.

== History ==
After returning from travelling in Italy to develop his knowledge in 1771, Goya received the commission to decorate the vault over the small choir of the Basílica del Pilar in Zaragoza, with a painting on the adoration of the name of God, in the execution of which he amply demonstrated his mastery of the techniques of fresco painting. His remuneration, however, was less than that of the other artists working on the ceilings of the basilica: Goya received 15,000 reales in comparison with the 25,000 paid to, for example, Antonio González Velázquez.

== Description ==
The work in its final execution displays the stereotypes of Late Baroque Catholic religious painting. To either side are arranged groups of angels directing the attention to the central scene, dominated by the symbol of the Christian Trinity and Godhead: an equilateral triangle inscribed with the Tetragrammaton in Hebrew. Because the various groups are situated at different altitudes, the final impression is rather static, dominated by a composition in the shape of an "X", the result of Goya's intention to have the lines of force coming in from the corners and crossing in the centre.

Various sketches and preparatory drawings for the work have been preserved which display more accomplishment than the painting on the cupola shows in actuality, although it must be borne in mind that the fresco has been restored no less than four times, in 1887, 1947, 1967 and 1991. In them Goya planned a composition of great contrast in the colouring and the illumination, and with a considerably greater dynamism in the movement than is visible in the finished product.

== See also ==
- Name of God in Christianity
- List of works by Francisco Goya
