= Albalate del Arzobispo =

- municipality
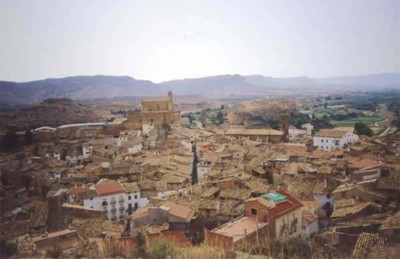

- Flag Coat of arms

- Location within Spain
- Coordinates: 41°07′N 0°31′W
- Country: Spain
- Autonomous community: Aragon
- Province: Teruel

Area
  - Total: 205.69 km^{2} (79.42 sq mi)
- Elevation: 343 m (1,125 ft)

Population (2025-01-01)
  - Total: 1,936
  - Density: 9.412/km^{2} (24.38/sq mi)
- Time zone: UTC+1 (CET)
  - Summer (DST): UTC+2 (CEST)

Albalate del Arzobispo is a municipality located in the province of Teruel, Aragon, Spain. According to the 2004 census (Instituto Nacional de Estadística), the municipality had a population of 2,180 inhabitants.

== See also ==
- List of municipalities in Teruel
