= Archdiocese of Zaragoza =

Roman Catholic archdiocese in Spain

Coordinates: 41.6547°N 0.8758°W

Metropolitan Archdiocese of Zaragoza Archidiœcesis Metropolitae Cæsaraugustana Archidiócesis Metropolitano de Zaragoza

Catholic
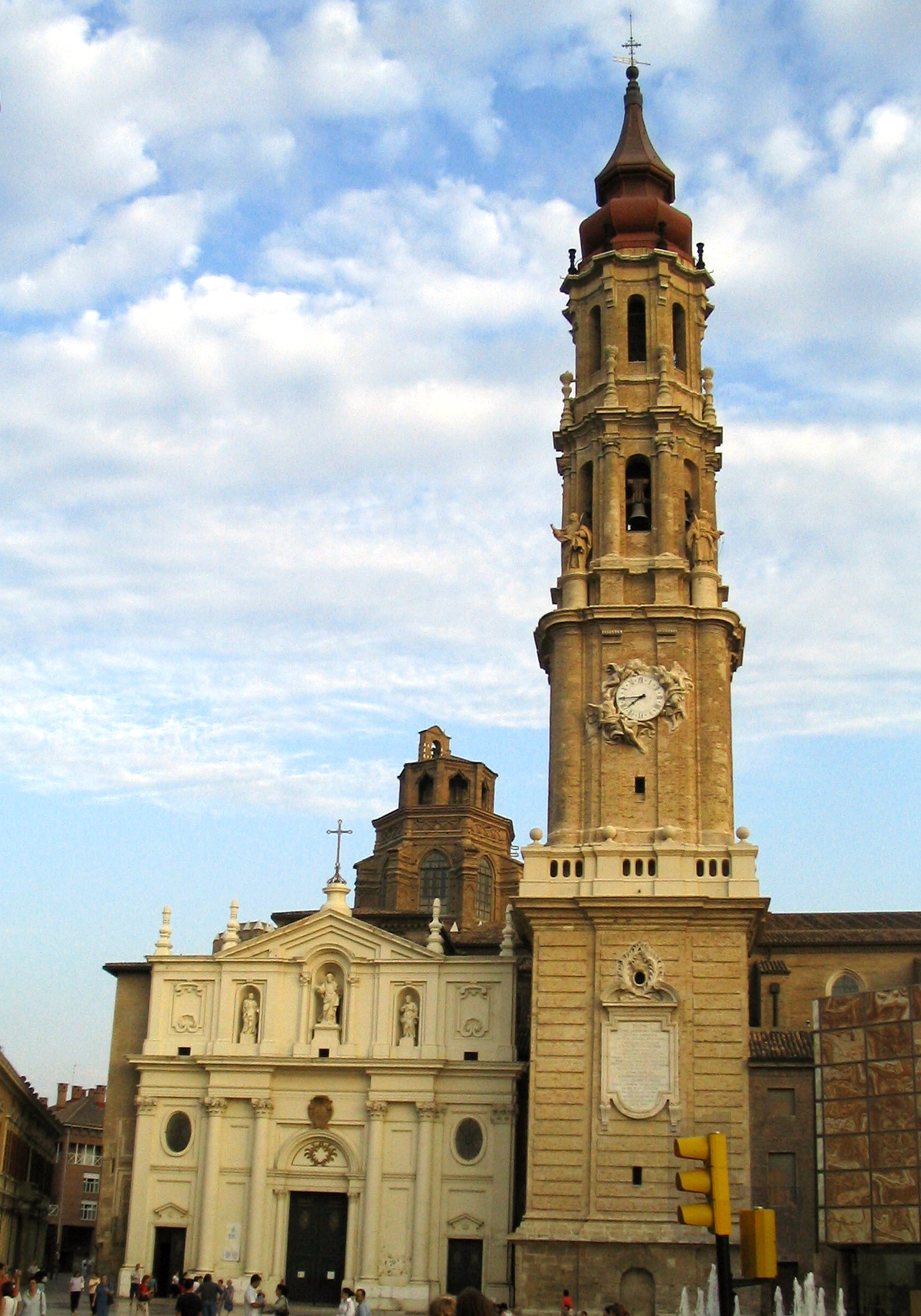
- La Seo Cathedral

Location
- Country: Spain

Statistics
- Area: 13,309 km^{2} (5,139 sq mi)
- Population: Total; Catholics: (as of 2010); 917,040; 873,040 (95.2%)

Information
- Denomination: Catholic
- Sui iuris church: Latin Church
- Rite: Roman Rite
- Established: 5th Century (As Diocese of Zaragoza); 14 July 1318 (As Archdiocese of Zaragoza)
- Cathedral: Cathedral of Our Saviour in Zaragoza
- Co-cathedral: Cathedral Basilica of Our Lady of the Pillar in Zaragoza

Current leadership
- Pope: Leo XIV
- Metropolitan Archbishop: Carlos Manuel Escribano Subías
- Suffragans: Diocese of Barbastro-Monzón; Diocese of Huesca; Diocese of Tarazona; Diocese of Teruel and Albarracín
- Bishops emeritus: Manuel Ureña Pastor (2005–2014); Vicente Jiménez Zamora (2014-2020)

Map

Website
- arzobispadodezaragoza.org

Ecclesiastical province of Zaragoza

The Metropolitan Archdiocese of Zaragoza (Latin: Archidiœcesis Metropolitae Cæsaraugustana; Aragonese: Archidiocesi Metropolitano de Zaragoza) is a Latin diocese of the Catholic Church located in north-eastern Spain, in the province of Zaragoza (older in English: Saragossa), part of the autonomous community of Aragón. The archdiocese heads the ecclesiastical province of Zaragoza, having metropolitan authority over the suffragan dioceses of Barbastro-Monzón, Huesca, Tarazona, and Teruel and Albarracín.

The diocese was created in Roman times; Pope John XXII elevated it to an archdiocese in 1318.

== Overview ==
In 1912, the diocese was bounded on the north by Navarre and Huesca; on the east by Huesca, Lerida, and Tarragona; on the south by Valencia and Teruel; on the west by Guadalajara and Soria. The episcopal city of Zaragoza is situated on the river Ebro.

The cathedral is dedicated to the Saviour, as it had been before the Moorish invasion. It shares its rank with the Church of Nuestra Señora del Pilar, half of the chapter residing at each of the two churches, while the dean resides six months at each alternately. The building of the cathedral was begun by Pedro Tarrjao in the fourteenth century. In 1412, Antipope Benedict XIII caused a magnificent baldachinum to be erected, but one of its pillars fell down, and it was reduced to its present condition. In 1490 Archbishop Alonso of Aragón raised the two lateral naves, which had been lower, to an equal height with the central, and added two more; Ferdinand of Aragon added three other naves beyond the choir, to counterbalance the excessive width of the building, and thus, in 1550 was the Gothic edifice completed. The great chancel and choir were built by order of Archbishop Dalmau de Mury Cervellón (1431–58). In the chapel of Saint Dominguito del Val are preserved the relics of that saint, a boy of seven allegedly crucified by the Jews in 1250. The façade of the cathedral is Renaissance, and beside it rises the tower, more modern than the body of the church, having been begun in 1790.

The Church of Nuestra Señora del Pilar is believed to have originated in a chapel built by the Apostle James. Bishop Pedro de Librana (1119–1128) found it almost in ruins and appealed to the charity of all the faithful to rebuild it. At the close of the thirteenth century four bishops again stirred up the zeal of the faithful to repair the building, which was preserved until the end of the seventeenth century. In 1681 work was commenced on the new church, the first stone being laid by Archbishop Diego de Castrillo on 25 July 1685. This grandiose edifice, 140 metres in length, covers the capella angelica, where the celebrated image of the Blessed Virgin is venerated. Though the style of the building is not of the best period, attention is attracted by its exterior, its multitude of cupolas, which are reflected in the waters of the river Ebro, giving it a character all its own.

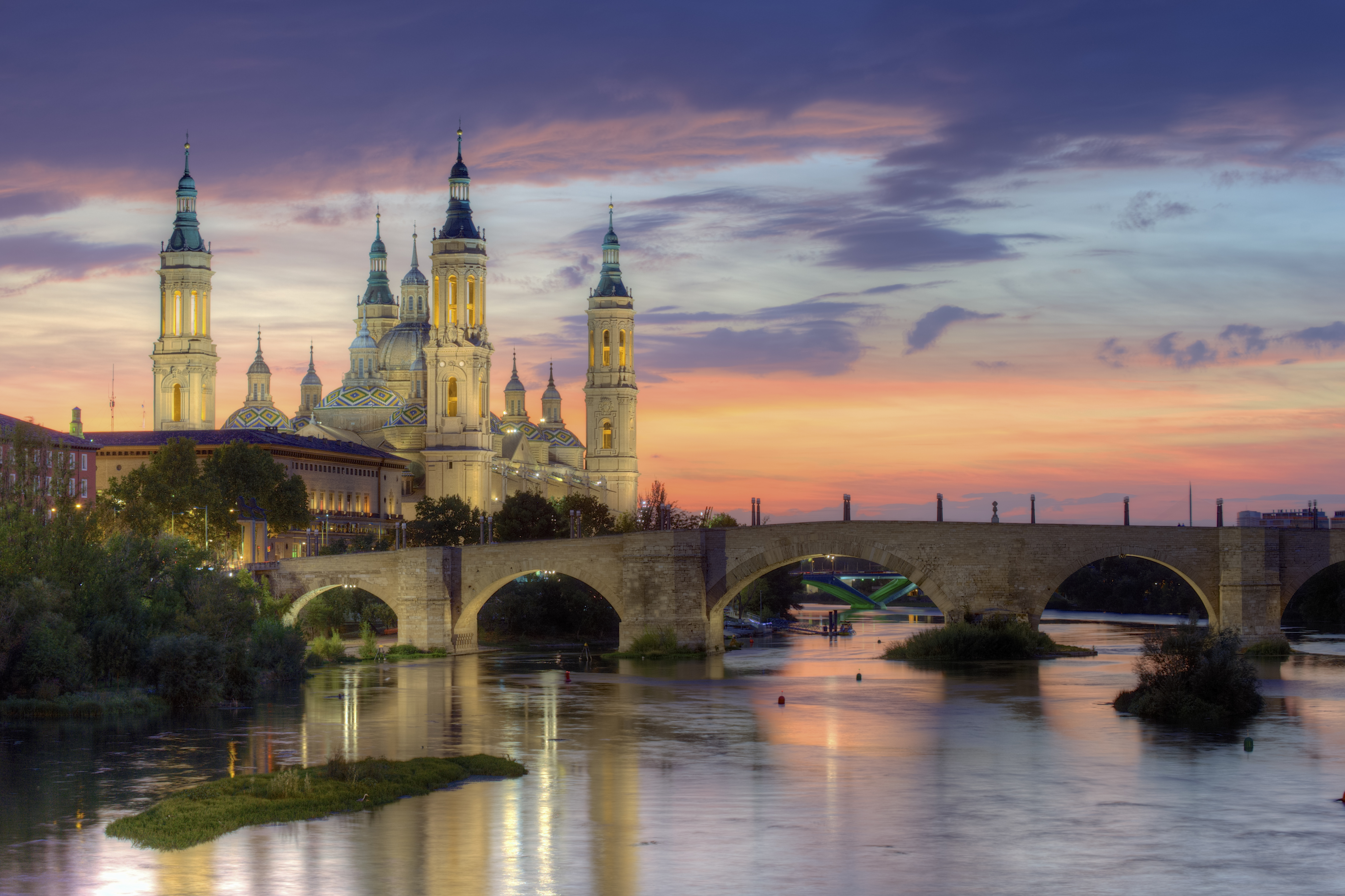
Cathedral Basilica of Our Lady of the Pillar

Zaragoza possesses many very noteworthy churches. Among them is the Church of Santa Engracia de Zaragoza, built on the spot where the victims of Dacian were martyred. It was destroyed in the Spanish War of Independence, only the crypt and the doorway being left; it was rebuilt in the late 19th or early 20th century, and now serves as a parish church.

The University of Zaragoza obtained from Charles I (the Emperor Charles V) in 1542, the privileges accorded to others in Spain. Its importance was afterwards promoted by Pedro Cerbuna, Bishop of Tarazona; he gave it a building which lasted until it was blown up by the French in 1808. A separate building has been erected for the faculties of medicine and sciences.

The archiepiscopal palace is a splendid edifice erected by Archbishop Agustín de Lezo y Palomeque.

There are two ecclesiastical seminaries. That of Sts. Valerius and Braulius, founded by Archbishop Agustín de Lezo y Palomeque in 1788, was destroyed by an explosion and was rebuilt in 1824 by Archbishop Bernardo Francés Caballero; that of St. Charles Borromeo, formerly a Jesuit college, was converted into a seminary by King Charles III.

== History ==
Before the Roman period the site of Zaragoza appears to have been occupied by Salduba, a little village of Edetania, within the boundaries of Celtiberia.

=== Roman period (1st to 5th centuries) ===
In 24 BC (727 a.u.c.), Emperor Octavius Augustus, then in his seventh consulate, founded the colony of Caesar Augusta, giving it the Italian franchise and making it the capital of a juridical conventus. Geographer Pomponius Mela called it "the most illustrious of the inland cities of Hispania Tarraconensis."

The diocese is one of the oldest in Spain, for its origin dates back to the coming of the Apostle James — a fact of which there had never been any doubt until Caesar Baronius, influenced by a fabulous story of García de Loaisa, called it in question. Pope Urban VIII ordered the old lesson in the Breviary dealing with this point to be restored.

Closely involved with the tradition of St. James's coming to Spain, and of the founding of the church of Zaragoza, are those of Our Lady of the Pillar and of Sts. Athanasius and Theodore, disciples of St. James, who are supposed to have been the first bishops of Zaragoza.

About the year 256 there appears as bishop of this diocese Felix Caesaraugustanus, who defended true discipline in the case of Basilides and Martial, Bishops, respectively, of Astorga and Mérida.

St. Valerius, who assisted at the Council of Iliberis, was bishop from 290 to 315 and, together with his disciple and deacon St. Vincent, suffered martyrdom in the persecution of Dacian.

It is believed that there had been martyrs at Zaragoza in previous persecutions as Prudentius seems to affirm; but no certain record is to be found of any before this time, when, too, St. Engratia and the "numberless saints" (santos innumerables), as they are called, gained their crowns.

It is said that Dacian, to detect and so make an end of all the faithful of Zaragoza, ordered that liberty to practice their religion should be promised them on condition that they all went out of the city at a certain fixed time and by certain designated gates. As soon as they had thus gone forth, he ordered them to be put to the sword and their corpses burned. Their ashes were mixed with those of criminals, so that no veneration might be paid them. But a shower of rain fell and washed the ashes apart, forming those of the martyrs into certain white masses. These, known as the "holy masses" (las santas masas) were deposited in the crypt of the church dedicated to St. Engratia, where they are still preserved.

St. Vincent was taken to Valencia, where he suffered a long and terrible martyrdom. St. Valerius was exiled to a place called Enet, near Barbastro, where he died, and whence his relics were translated first to Roda, the head and arm being brought thence to Zaragoza when that city had been reconquered.

Before the Moorish invasion three national councils were held at Zaragoza. The First Council of Saragossa was held in 380, earlier than those of Toledo, when Valerius II was bishop, and had for its object the extirpation of Priscillianism.

=== Visigoth period (5th to 7th centuries) ===
In 452, Zaragoza fell under the power of the Suevian king Reciarius; in 466, under that of the Visigoth king Euric. St. Isidore extolled it as one of the best cities of Spain in the Gothic period, and Pacensis called it "the most ancient and most flourishing."

In 542, when the Franks laid siege to Zaragoza to take vengeance for the wrongs of the Catholic princess, Clotilde, the besieged went forth in procession and delivered to the enemy, as the price of their raising the siege, a portion of the blood-stained stole of St. Vincent, the deacon.

From 592 to 619, the bishop was Maximus, who assisted at the Councils of Barcelona and Egara. Under his episcopate the Second Council of Zaragoza was held in 592 against Arianism. Maximus' name, combined with that of the monk Marcus, has been used to form an alleged Marcus Maximus, the apocryphal continuator of Flavius Dexter.

The See of Zaragoza was occupied during the Gothic period by two illustrious bishops: St. Braulius (631–651), who assisted at the Fourth, Fifth, and Sixth Councils of Toledo; and Taius (Tajón) (651–664), famous for his own writings and for having discovered at Rome the third part of St. Gregory's "Morals."

The Third Council of Zaragoza was held in 691 under Bishop Valderedus, and provided that queens, when widowed, should retire to some monastery for their security and for the sake of decorum.

=== Moorish period (714–1118) ===
During the Moorish occupation, Catholic worship did not cease in this city; the churches of the Virgin and of St. Engratia were maintained, while that of the Saviour was turned into a mosque.

Of the bishops of this period the names are preserved of Senior, who visited St. Eulogius at Cordoba (849), and of Eleca, who in 890 was driven from the city by the Muslims and took refuge at Oviedo.

Paternus was sent by king Sancho the Great to Cluny to introduce the Cluniac reform into Spain in the monasteries of San Juan de la Peña and San Salvador de Leyre, and was afterwards appointed Bishop of Zaragoza (1040–1077).

=== Christian period (1118–1318) ===
King Alfonso I the Battler of Aragon reconquered the city on 18 December 1118, and named as bishop Pedro de Librana, whose appointment was confirmed by Pope Gelasius II.

López, in his Historia de Zaragoza, says that Pedro de Librana first resided at the Church of the Pillar, and on 6 January 1119, purified the great mosque, which he dedicated to the Saviour, and there established his episcopal see. Hence the controversy which began in 1135, in the episcopate of García Guerra de Majones, between the canons of the Pillar and those of St. Saviour as to the title of cathedral.

=== Archdiocese of Zaragoza (1318–present) ===
In 1318, the See of Zaragoza was made metropolitan by a grant of Pope John XXII (14 June), Pedro López de Luna being bishop.

In the factions which followed upon the death of King Martin I, Archbishop García Fernández de Heredia (1383–1411) was assassinated in 1411 by Antonio de Luna, a partisan of the Count James II of Urgell.

For more than a century (1458–1577) princes of the royal blood occupied the see:

- 1458–1475 : Juan of Aragon, natural son of king Juan II;
- 1478–1520 : Alonso de Aragón (or Alfonso de Aragón), illegitimate son of Ferdinand the Catholic and also Archbishop of Valencia in 1512–1520.
- 1520–1530 : Juan of Aragon.
- 1539–1577 : Fernando of Aragon, who had been the Cistercian abbot of Veruela.

On 15 September 1485, Pedro Arbués, canon of the Cathedral of Zaragoza and one of the driving forces behind the Tribunal of the Inquisition, was attacked in the cathedral by some relapsed Jews who were led by Juan de la Abadia and died two days later. In response to the assassination, hundreds were arrested and between one and two hundred were put to death, including the assailants.

== Bishops of Zaragoza ==
- 39–59 : St. Athanasius
- ca. 66 : : St. Theodore
- ca. 105 : Epictetus
- ca. 256 : Felix
- ca. 277 : Valerus
- 290–315 : St. Valerius
  - St. Vincent (Coadjutor de St. Valerius)
- ca. 326 : Clement
- ca. 343 : Castus
- ca. 380 : Valerius II - (Mentioned in 380)
- ca. 516 : Vincent I - (Mentioned in 516)
- 540–546 : John
- ------------- : Vincent II - (In times of Leovigild)
- 589–592 : Simplicius
- 592–619 : Maximus
- 619–631 : John II
- 631–651 : St. Braulius
- 651–664 : Taius (Tajón)
- 683–701 : Valderedus
- 839–863 : Senior
- 864–902 : Eleca
- 1040–1077 : Paternus
- 1077–1110 : Julian
- -------–1111 : Vincent III
- -------–1112 : Peter
- 1113–1118 : Bernardo
- 1119–1128 : Pedro de Librana
- 1128–1130 : Esteban
- 1130–1137 : García Guerra de Majones
- -------–1137 : Guillermo
- 1137–1152 : Bernardo Jiménez
- 1152–1184 : Pedro Tarroja
- 1184–1199 : Ramón de Castellazuelo
- -------–1200 : Rodrigo de Rocabertí
- 1201–1216 : Ramón de Castrocol
- 1216–1236 : Sancho de Ahonés
- 1236–1239 : Bernardo de Monteagudo
- 1239–1244 : Vicente Sola
- 1244–1248 : Rodrigo de Ahonés
- 1248–1271 : Arnaldo de Peralta
- 1271–1272 : Sancho de Peralta
- 1272–1280 : Pedro Garcés de Jaunas
- 1280–1289 : See vacant
- 1289–1296 : Hugo de Mataplana
- 1296–1317 : Jimeno de Luna
- 1317–1318 : Pedro López de Luna

== Metropolitan Archbishops of Zaragoza ==
1. 1318–1345 : Pedro López de Luna
2. 1345–1347 : Pedro de Jugie
3. 1347–1350 : Guillermo de Aigrefeuille
4. 1351 – c.1380 Lope Fernández de Luna
5. 1383–1411 : García Fernández de Heredia
  - 1411–1415 : See vacant
6. 1415–1419 : Francisco Clemente Pérez Capera - (1st time)
7. 1419–1429 : Alfonso de Argüello
  - 1429–1430 : Francisco Clemente Pérez Capera - (2nd time)
8. 1431–1456 : Dalmacio de Mur y de Cervelló
9. 1458–1475 : Juan de Aragón, natural son of king John II of Aragon.
10. 1474–1478 : Ausias Despuig
11. 1478–1520 : Alonso of Aragón (or Alfonso de Aragón), illegitimate son of Ferdinand the Catholic and also Archbishop of Valencia in 1512–1520.
12. 1520–1530 : Juan de Aragón (II)
13. 1532–1539 : Fadrique de Portugal
14. 1539–1577 : Fernando de Aragón y Gurrea
15. 1577–1578 : Bernardo Alvarado de Fresneda
16. 1579–1585 : Andrés Santos de Sampedro
17. 1586–1592 : Andrés de Bobadilla
18. 1593–1602 : Alonso de Gregorio
19. 1603–1610 : Tomás de Borja y Castro
20. 1611–1615 : Pedro Manrique de Lara (archbishop)
21. 1616–1623 : Pedro González de Mendoza
22. 1624–1629 : Juan Martínez de Peralta
23. 1630–1631 : Martín Terrer de Valenzuela
24. 1633–1634 : Juan Guzmán (archbishop)
25. 1635–1643 : Pedro Apaolaza Ramírez
26. 1644–1662 : Juan Cebrián Pedro
27. 1663–1674 : Francisco de Gamboa
28. 1676–1686 : Diego de Castrillo
29. 1687–1710 : Antonio Ibáñez de la Riva Herrera
30. 1714–1726 : Manuel Pérez de Araciel y Rada
31. 1727–1742 : Tomás Crespo Agüero
32. 1742–1764 : Francisco Añoa Busto
33. 1764–1767 : Luis García Mañero
34. 1768–1777 : Juan Sáenz de Buruaga
35. 1779–1782 : Bernardo Velarde
36. 1783–1796 : Agustín de Lezo y Palomeque
37. 1797–1800 : Joaquín Company Soler
38. 1800–1816 : Ramón José de Arce
39. 1816–1823 : Manuel Vicente Martínez Jiménez
40. 1824–1843 : Bernardo Francés Caballero
41. 1847–1858 : Manuel María Gómez de las Rivas
42. 1858–1881 : Manuel García Gil
43. 1881–1895 : Francisco de Paula Benavides y Navarrete
44. 1895–1901 : Vicente Alda Sancho
  - 1901 : Antonio María Cascajares y Azara – (Elected)
45. 1902–1923 : Juan Soldevila y Romero
46. 1924–1955 : Rigoberto Doménech Valls
47. 1955–1964 : Casimiro Morcillo González
48. 1964–1977 : Pedro Cantero Cuadrado
49. 1977–2005 : Elías Yanes Álvarez
50. 2005–2014 : Manuel Ureña Pastor
51. 2014–2020: Vicente Jiménez Zamora
52. 2020– : Carlos Manuel Escribano Subías

== Suffragan Diocese ==
Zaragoza in dark green suffragan in light green.

| Diocese | Notes | Cathedral Photo | Co Cathedral Photo |
|---|---|---|---|
| Zaragoza | | Cathedral Zaragoza | |
| Barbastro-Monzón | | Barbastro Cathedral. | Co-Cathedral Monzón. |
| Huesca | | Huesca Cathedral | |
| Tarazona | | Tarazona Cathedral | |
| Teruel and Albarracín. | | Cathedral TorreSanPedro | AlbarracínCathedral. |

== See also ==
- Catholic Church in Spain
- List of the Roman Catholic dioceses of Spain

== Sources ==
- IBERCRONOX: Obispado y Arzobispado de Zaragoza (Caesaraugusta) (in Spanish)
