= Manuel Ureña Pastor =

Spanish prelate of the Catholic Church (born 1945)

- Archbishop Emeritus of Zaragoza
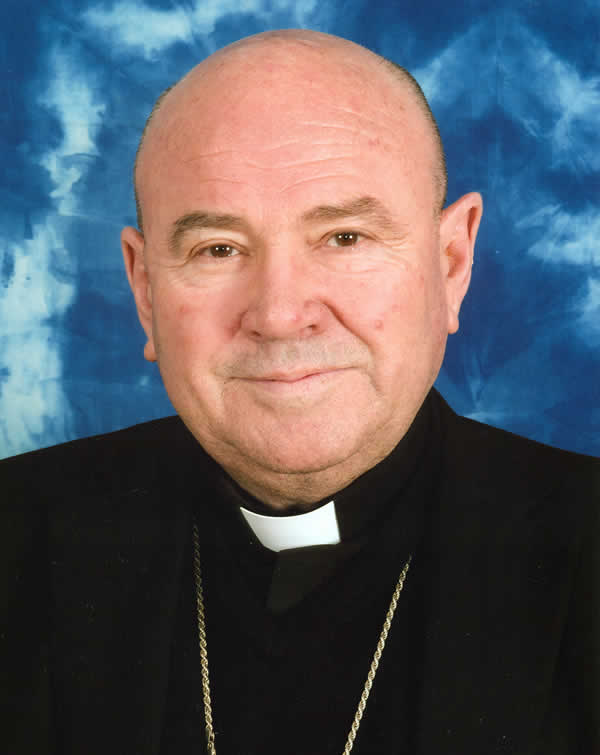
- Church: Catholic Church
- Archdiocese: Archdiocese of Zaragoza
- In office: 2 April 2005 – 12 November 2014
- Predecessor: Elías Yanes Álvarez
- Successor: Vicente Jiménez Zamora
- Previous posts: Bishop of Cartagena (1998-2005); Bishop of Alcalá de Henares (1991-1998); Bishop of Ibiza (1988-1991)

Orders
- Ordination: 14 July 1973
- Consecration: 11 September 1988 by Mario Tagliaferri

Personal details
- Born: 4 March 1945 (age 81) Albaida, Province of Valencia, Spanish State

Manuel Ureña Pastor (born 4 March 1945) is a Spanish prelate of the Catholic Church who became a bishop in 1988 and served as ordinary in Ibiza, Alcalá de Henares, and Cartagena before becoming Archbishop of Zaragoza, the position he held from 2005 until he retired in 2014. He resigned citing health problems, though later reports demonstrated his mishandling of a charge of harassment against one of his priests.

== Biography ==
Manuel Ureña Pastor was born in Albaida, Valencia, on 4 March 1945. He attended the Escuela Nacional de Albaida from 1951 to 1959 and then entered the Metropolitan Seminary of Valencia in Moncada. He earned his licentiate in dogmatic theology at the Pontifical University of Salamanca in 1973. He was ordained a priest on 14 July 1973 in Valencia. He was a pastoral vicar for three years and then earned a doctorate in philosophy at the Pontifical University Angelicum in 1984. He became director of the Colegio Mayor San Juan de Ribera in Burjassot.

Pope John Paul II named him Bishop of Ibiza on 8 July 1988. He received his episcopal consecration on 11 September from Archbishop Mario Tagliaferri, Apostolic Nuncio to Spain. He served as well as the apostolic administrator of the Diocese of Menorca from 1990 to 1991.

On 23 July 1991, John Paul named him the first Bishop of Alcalá de Henares, newly created from the Archdiocese of Madrid, and on 1 July 1998, he was made Bishop of Cartagena and became Grand Chancellor of the Universidad Católica San Antonio de Murcia.

=== Zaragoza ===
On 12 March 2005, John Paul named him Archbishop of Zaragoza, though the appointment was not announced until 2 April, hours before John Paul's death. (Note: The announcement was unusual in that the date of an appointment normally coincides with the date of the press release, unless an appointment takes effect at a future date. In this instance, the 2 April press release announced 12 March as the date of Ureña's appointment and his predecessor's retirement.) He was installed on 19 June. He became ex officio Grand Chancellor of the Universidad San Jorge in Zaragoza. In the Spanish Episcopal Conference he was a member of the Episcopal Commission for Teaching and Catechesis.

On 12 November 2014, Pope Francis accepted his resignation as archbishop under the legal formula allowing for resignation "for reasons of health or other serious reason". Ureña had several surgeries in recent years, and he released a statement citing health reasons. Later that month, local media reported, and the Catholic weekly Vida Nueva confirmed, that Ureña was forced to resign for having paid thousands of Euros to an adult deacon who had been sexually harassed by a priest in Épila, a sum designed to finance his studies toward a university degree now that he no longer sought ordination. No action was taken against the priest. (Note: The 47-year-old parish priest, Miguel Ángel Barco, then denied any harassment had occurred and sued the 27-year-old ex-deacon, Daniel Peruga, for libel. Early in 2015, the parties came to an agreement to prevent the case from proceeding. It later transpired that Peruga had written Pope Francis early in November 2014 asking to be laicized and released from his vow of celibacy. Four years later, on 5 December 2018, the Archbishop of Zaragoza, Vicente Jiménez, announced that Pope Francis had laicized Barco and that Barco, notified of this a year earlier, refused to accept this judgment.) The Archdiocese admitted the payment and said it was not related to Ureña's resignation because of his health.
