= Manuel Pérez de Araciel y Rada =

18th-century Roman Catholic bishop

Most Reverend Manuel Pérez de Araciel y Rada
- Archbishop of Zaragoza
- Church: Catholic Church
- In office: 1687–1710
- Predecessor: Antonio Ibáñez de la Riva Herrera
- Successor: Tomás Crespo Agüero

Orders
- Consecration: 1714

Personal details
- Died: 27 September 1726 Zaragoza

Manuel Pérez de Araciel y Rada (1653-27 September 1726) was a Spanish bishop from (1714-1726). He was Bishop of the Roman Catholic Diocese of León, Spain from 28 April 1704 and then Roman Catholic Archbishop of Zaragoza diocese from 27 March 1714 till his death. (27 September 1726)

He is known the epistle Carta pastoral. The Carta pastoral is a 10-page epistle "To the...Rhetors, Vicars, Racioneros, Beneficiaries, and other Priests, and Ecclesiastes... of our Diocese, and especially to those of the Villas of Belchite, Cariñena, Epila, and the Places six leagues around each of them."
