= Councils of Saragossa =

The councils of Saragossa (Latin: Concilia Caesaraugustana) were a series of Christian councils held in Zaragoza, in what is now Spain.

In or about 380 a council of Spanish and Aquitanian bishops adopted at Zaragoza eight canons bearing more or less directly on the prevalent heresy of Priscillianism. A second council, held by Maximus of Zaragoza in 592, solved practical problems incident to the recent conversion of the West Goths from Arianism to Chalcedonian Christianity. The third council, in 691, issued five canons on discipline.

In 1318 a provincial synod proclaimed the elevation of Zaragoza to the rank of an archbishopric; and from September 1565 to February 1566 a similar synod made known the decrees of the Council of Trent.
