= Elías Yanes Álvarez =

Spanish Roman Catholic bishop (1928–2018)

- Archbishop of Zaragoza
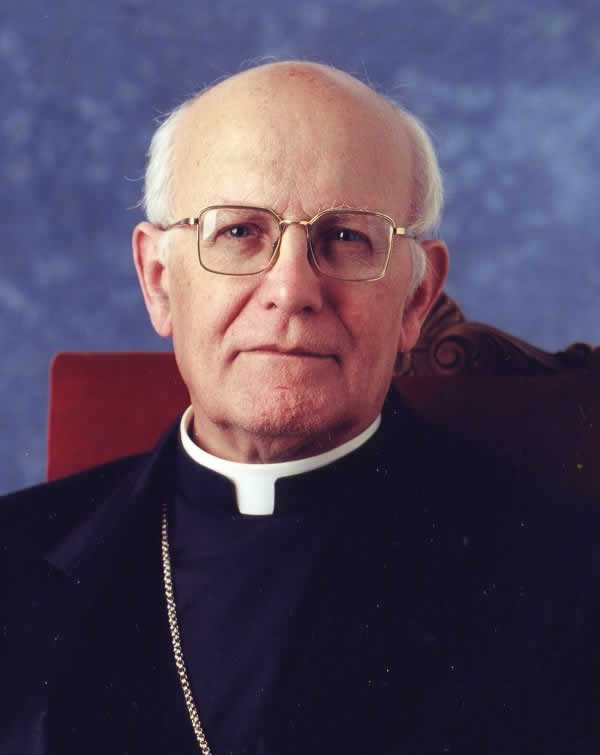
- Church: Catholic Church
- Archdiocese: Archdiocese of Zaragoza
- In office: 3 June 1977 – 2 April 2005
- Predecessor: Pedro Cantero Cuadrado
- Successor: Manuel Ureña Pastor
- Previous posts: Titular Bishop of Mulli (1970-1977); Auxiliary Bishop of Oviedo (1970-1977)

Orders
- Ordination: 31 May 1952
- Consecration: 28 November 1970 by Gabino Díaz Merchán

Personal details
- Born: 16 February 1928 Province of Canary Islands, Kingdom of Spain
- Died: 9 March 2018 (aged 90) Zaragoza, Aragon, Spain

Elias Yanes Álvarez (16 February 1928 – 9 March 2018) was a Spanish Roman Catholic bishop.

Yanes Álvarez was ordained to the priesthood in 1952. He served as titular bishop of Mulli and auxiliary bishop of the Roman Catholic Diocese of Oviedo, Spain from 1970 to 1977. Yanes Álvarez then served as Archbishop of the Roman Catholic Archdiocese of Zaragoza from 1977 until 2005.

== Publications ==
- Yo no creo en los curas (1964)
- El discernimiento pastoral (1975)
- Enseñanza religiosa y libertad de enseñanza en el marco de la actual democracia española (1983)
- La educación cristiana, don de Dios a su Iglesia (1987)
- Opciones fundamentales del movimiento rural cristiano (1991)
- La Acción Católica, un don del espíritu (2000)
- En el espíritu y la verdad, espiritualidad trinitaria (2000)
- Hombres y mujeres de oración (2007)
