= Cathedral-Basilica of Our Lady of the Pillar =

Catholic church in Zaragoza, Spain

Coordinates: 41°39′25″N 0°52′42″W

Cathedral Basilica of Our Lady of the Pillar
- Spanish: Catedral-Basílica de Nuestra Señora del Pilar
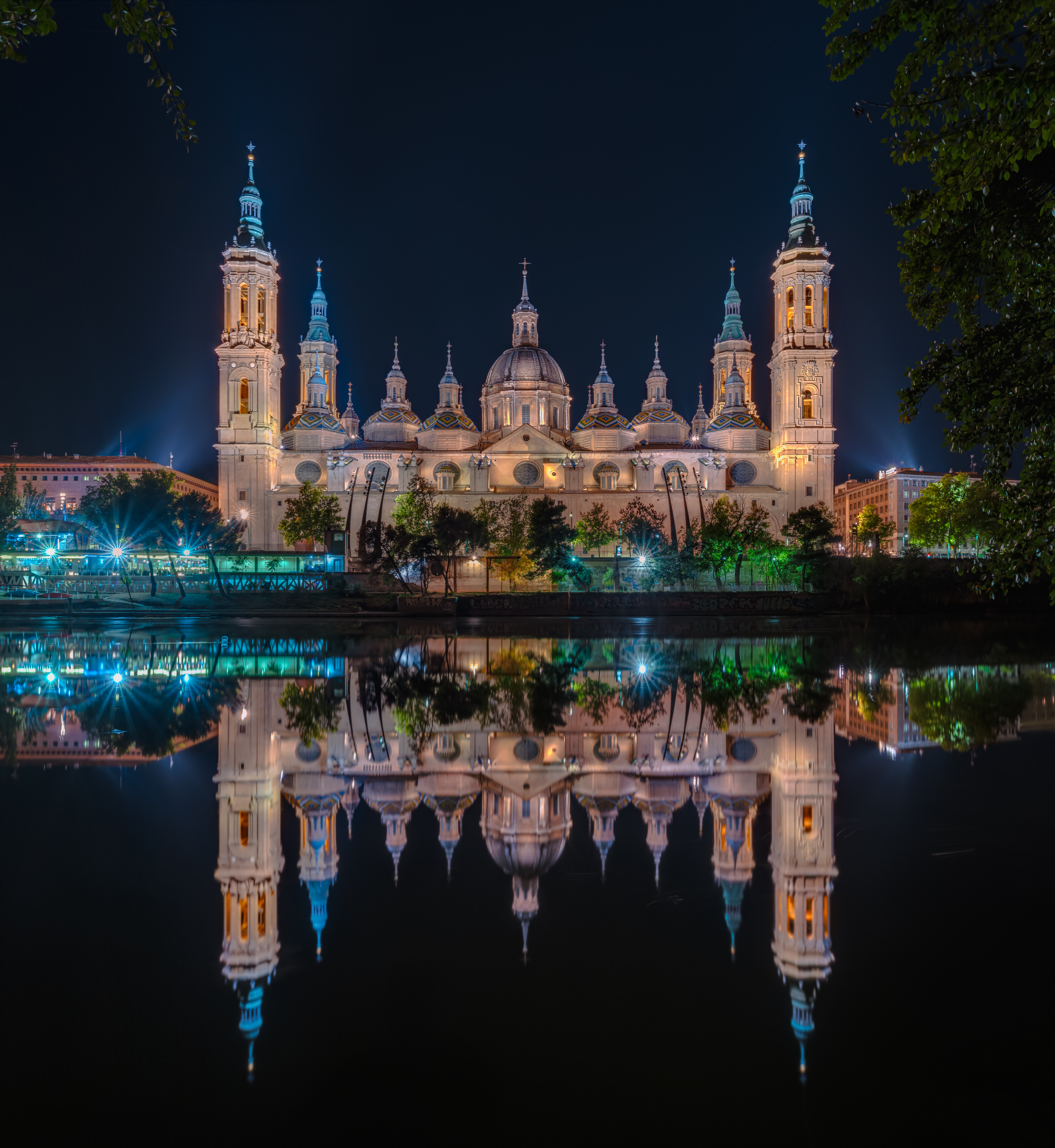
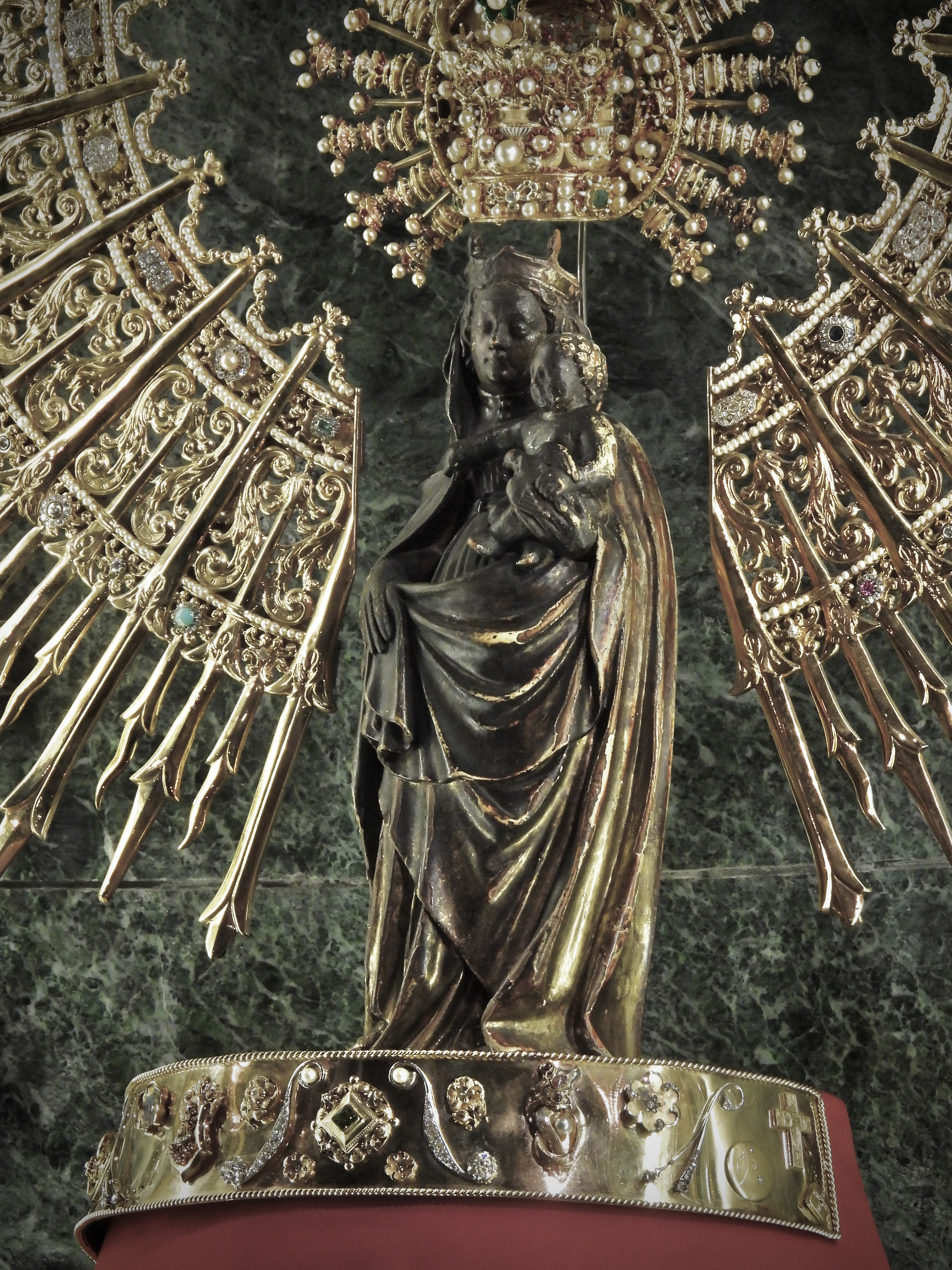
- Nuestra Señora del Pilar Basilica The Pilar and image of Our Lady on the altar of the Cathedral-Basilica of Our Lady of the Pilar in Zaragoza.

Religion
- Affiliation: Catholic Church
- Province: Archdiocese of Zaragoza
- Rite: Roman Rite
- Ecclesiastical or organisational status: Minor Basilica
- Year consecrated: 1st or 2nd century AD (founded by the pre-Schism Christian Church)

Location
- Location: Zaragoza, Spain
- Interactive map of Cathedral Basilica of Our Lady of the Pillar

Architecture
- Style: Baroque; Neo-Mudéjar
- Groundbreaking: 1681
- Completed: 1961
- Spanish Cultural Heritage
- Type: Non-movable
- Criteria: Monument
- Designated: 22 June 1904
- Reference no.: RI-51-0000083

The Cathedral Basilica of Our Lady of the Pillar (Spanish: Catedral-Basílica de Nuestra Señora del Pilar) is a Catholic church in the city of Zaragoza, Aragon. It is dedicated to the Blessed Virgin Mary under the title of Our Lady of the Pillar, praised as "Mother of the Hispanic Peoples" by Pope John Paul II. (Note: Pope John Paul II visited Zaragoza twice during his papacy: 31 October–9 November 1982 (including 11 other places in Spain) and 10–11 October 1984.) It is reputed to be the first-ever church dedicated to Mary.

Local traditions take the history of this basilica to the spread of Christianity in Roman Spain attributing to an apparition to Saint James the Great, the apostle who is believed by tradition to have brought Christianity to the country. This is the only reported apparition of Mary to have occurred before her reputed Assumption.

Many of the kings of Spain, many other foreign rulers and saints have paid their devotion before this statue of Mary. Saint John of the Cross, Saint Teresa of Ávila, Saint Ignatius of Loyola, and Blessed William Joseph Chaminade are among the foremost ones. The Basilica of Our Lady of the Pillar is one of two minor basilicas in the city of Zaragoza, and is co-cathedral of the city alongside the nearby La Seo de Zaragoza. The architecture is of Baroque style, and the present building was predominantly built between 1681 and 1872.

== History ==
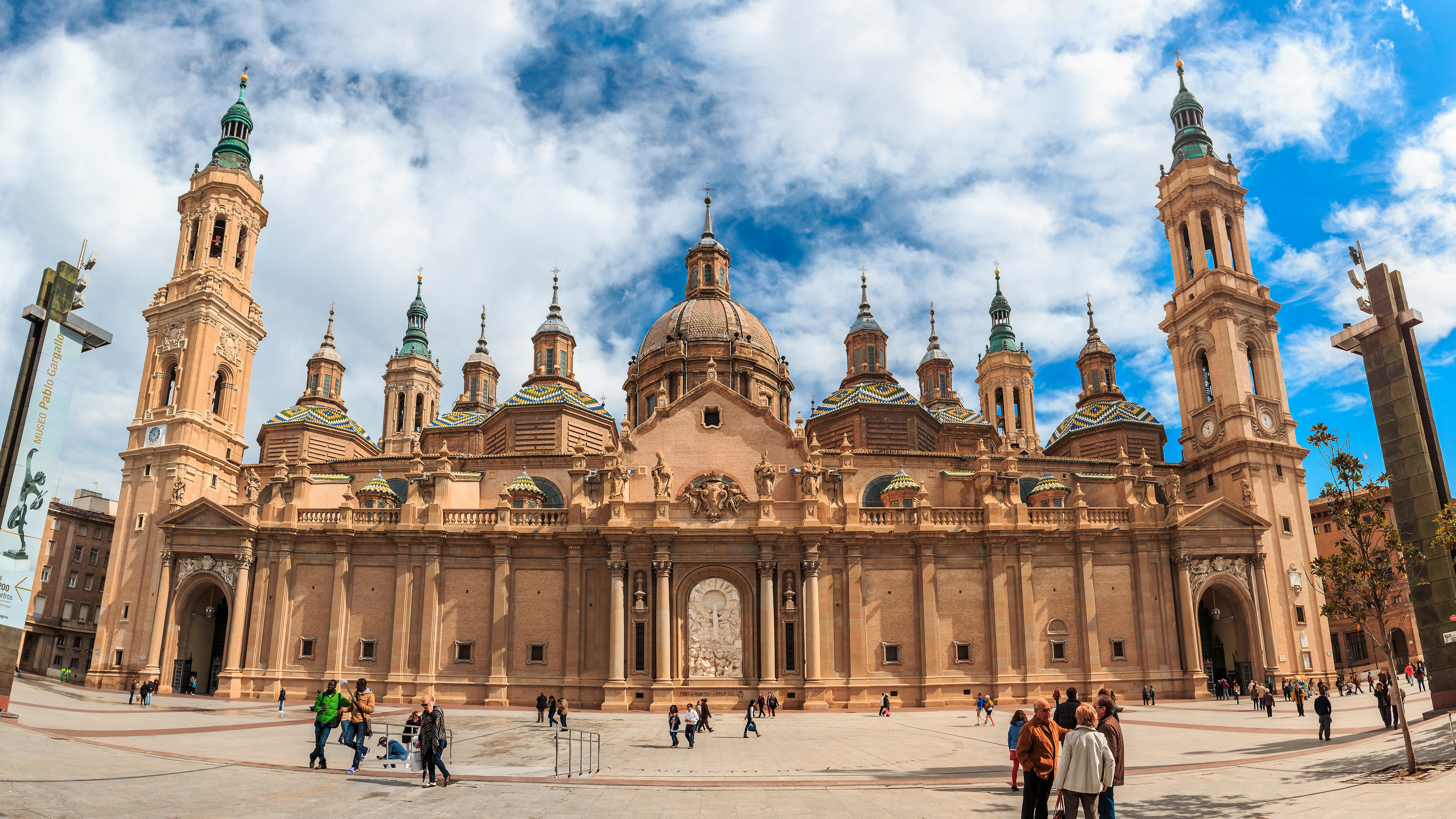
Front side of the basilica

=== Apparition of Pilar ===
According to local tradition, soon after the crucifixion and resurrection of Jesus, Saint James was preaching the Gospel in Spain, but was disheartened because of the failure of his mission. Tradition holds that on 2 January 40 AD, while he was deep in prayer by the banks of the Ebro, the Mother of Jesus appeared to him and gave a column of jasper and instructed him to build a church in her honour: "This place is to be my house, and this image and column shall be the title and altar of the temple that you shall build."

=== First chapel ===
About a year after the apparition, James is believed to have had a small chapel built in Mary's honour, the first church ever dedicated to her. After James returned to Jerusalem, he was executed by Herod Agrippa in about 44 AD, the first apostle to be martyred for his faith. Several of his disciples took his body and returned it for final burial in Spain. This first chapel was eventually destroyed with various other Christian shrines, but the statue and the pillar stayed intact under the protection of the people of Zaragoza.

=== Expansions ===
==== Romanesque church ====
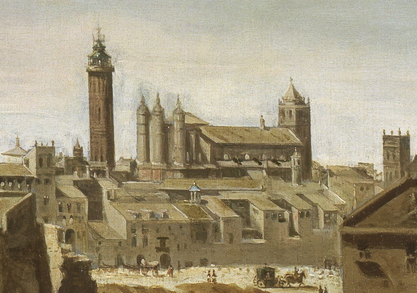
Mudéjar church of the Pillar in 1647 by Juan Bautista Martínez del Mazo.

Numerous churches have been built upon this site through the years. The tiny chapel built by Saint James later gave way to a basilica-like enclosure during Constantine I's time, subsequently being transformed into Romanesque, then Gothic then Mudéjar styles. The venerated shrines at Zaragoza date to the Christian Reconquest by King Alfonso I in 1118. A church in the Romanesque style was built under the pontificate of Pedro de Librana who is also credited with the oldest written testimonial to the Virgin at Zaragoza. A tympanum on the south wall of this Romanesque church still stands.

==== Gothic church ====
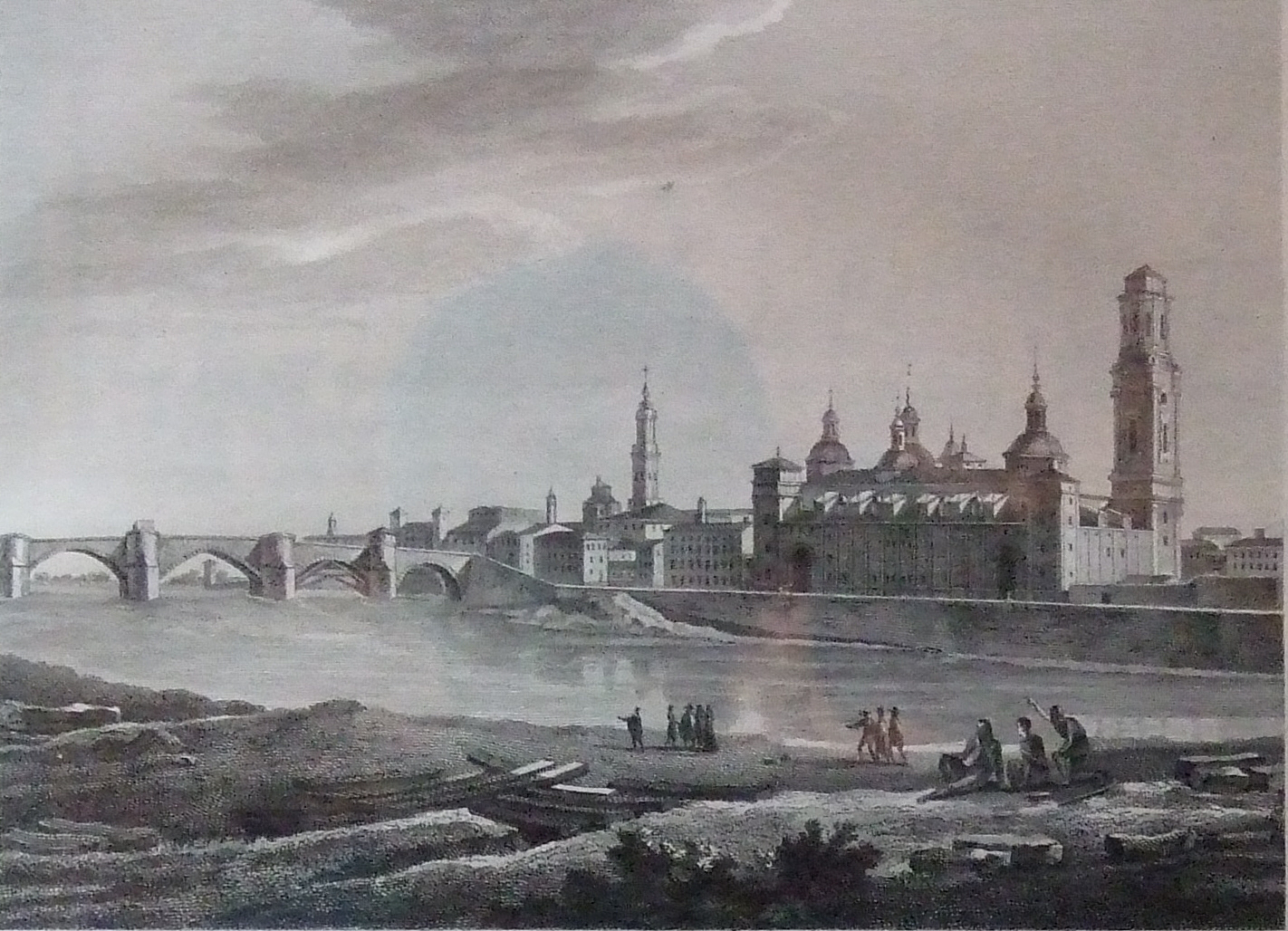
Basilica of the Pillar in 1806, before the four high Neo-Mudéjar spires were largely completed in 1872. The angular towers that enhance the exterior volume date to the 20th century, and were not completed until 1961. Engraving by Robert Daudet and Louis-François Lejeune.

The Romanesque church was damaged by fire in 1434, and reconstruction began in the Mudéjar Gothic style. A Gothic-style church was built in the 15th century but only a few parts of it remain intact or were later restored, including the choir stand and the altarpiece in alabaster by Damián Forment.

==== Current church ====
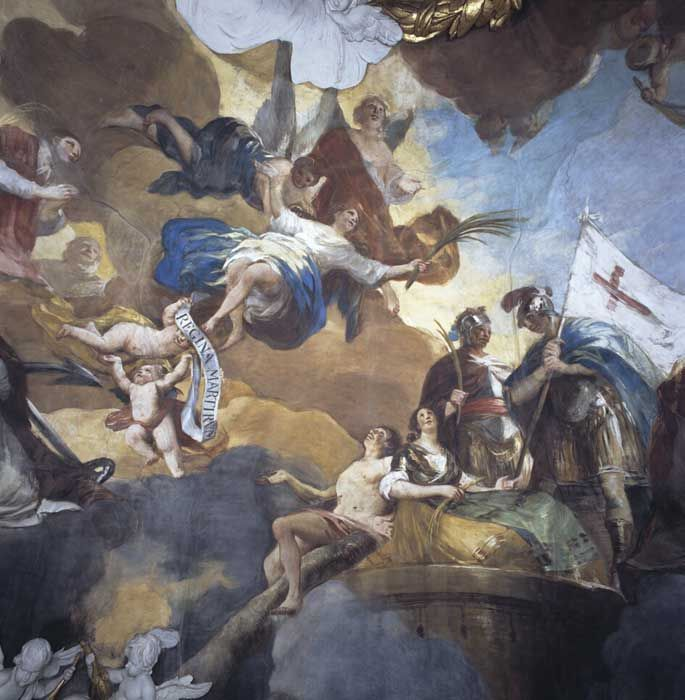
Detail of the fresco of The Queen of Martyrs in the dome, painted by Francisco Goya

The present spacious church in Baroque style was begun in 1681 by Charles II, King of Spain and completed in 1686. The early constructions were supervised by Felipe Sánchez and were later modified by Francisco Herrera the Younger under John of Austria the Younger. In 1725, the Cabildo of Zaragoza decided to change the aspect of the Holy Chapel and commissioned the architect Ventura Rodríguez, who transformed the building into its present dimensions of 130 meters long by 67 wide, with its eleven cupolas and four towers. The area most visited is the eastern part of the chapel, because this is where the Holy Chapel by Ventura Rodríguez (1754) is built, which houses the venerated image of the Virgin. Around the Holy Chapel are the vaults or domes painted with frescoes by Francisco Goya: The Queen of Martyrs and Adoration of the Name of God. The gilt covering and other ornamentation throughout the building were designed and overseen by Goya's father José. By 1718, the church's vaults had been completed. However, it was not until 1872 that the final touches were put to these vaults, when the main dome and the final spire were finished.

During the Spanish Civil War of 1936–1939 three bombs were dropped on the church but none of them exploded. Two of them are still on display in the basilica.

Notable choirmasters include the Baroque composer Joseph Ruiz Samaniego.

== Pillar and the image ==
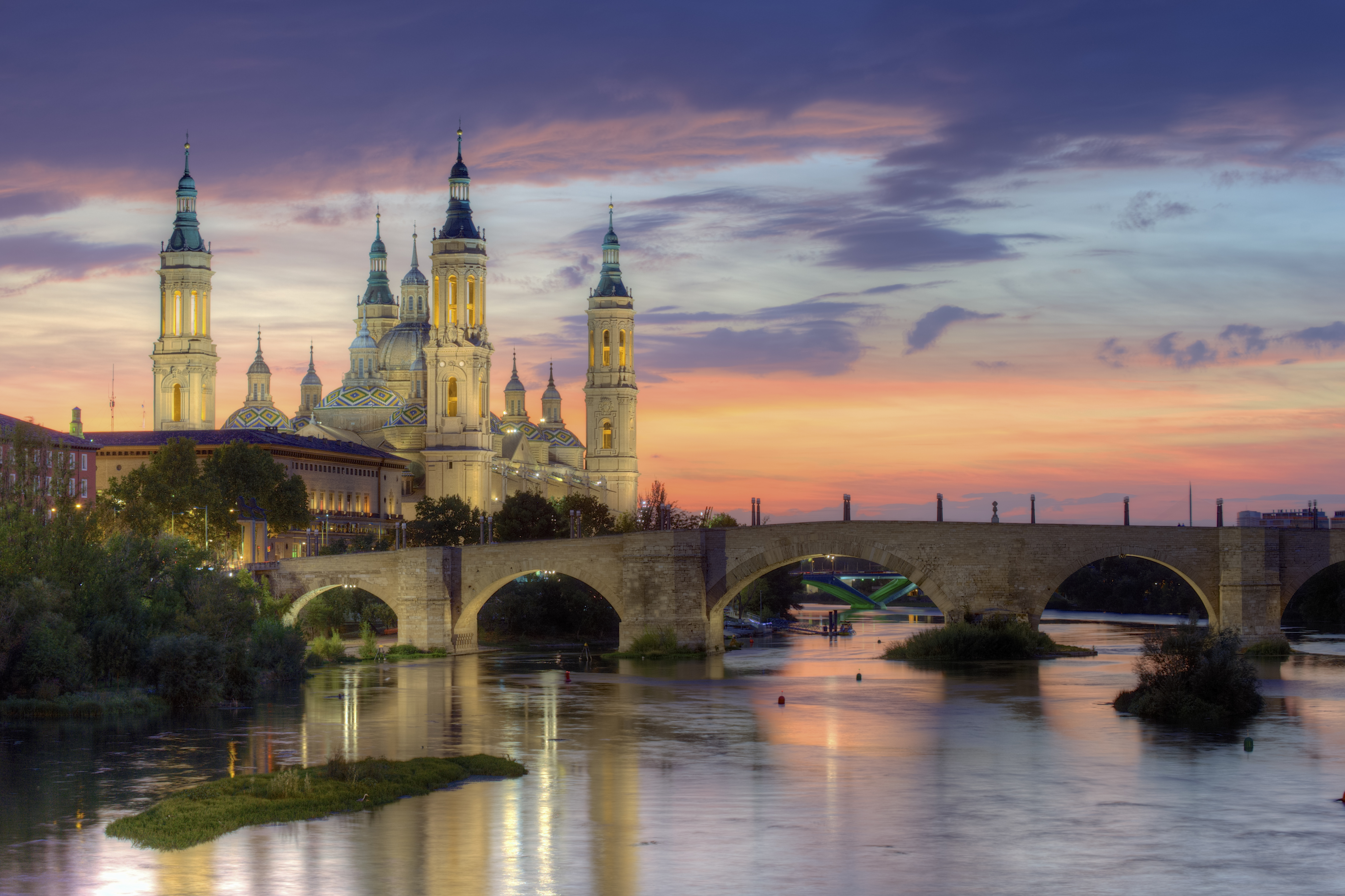
The basilica, viewed from across the Ebro

The statue is wooden and 39 cm tall and rests on a column of jasper. The tradition of the shrine of El Pilar, as given by Our Lady in an apparition to Sister Mary Agreda and written about in Mystical City of God, is that Our Lady was carried on a cloud by the angels to Zaragoza during the night. While they were traveling, the angels built a pillar of marble, and a miniature image of Our Lady. Our Lady gave the message to St James and added that a church was to be built on the site where the apparition took place. The pillar and the image were to be part of the main altar. The image was crowned in 1905 with a crown designed by the Marquis of Griñi, and valued at 450,000 pesetas (£18,750, 1910).

== Layout ==
The building, which can be seen from the nearby Ebro River, is a large rectangle with a nave and two aisles, with two other all-brick chapels, thus giving the whole a typically Aragonese touch. It is illuminated by large oculi, characteristic of the monuments of the region from the 17th century onwards. Twelve enormous pillars support the vaults of the nave and aisles; the whole is topped by domes, as are the chapels.

The chapels within the basilica include:

- Chapel of the Rosary
- Chapel of Joachim
- Chapel of Saint Lawrence (Lorenzo)
- Chapel of Saint Pedro de Arbués
- Chapel of Saint Braulio
- Chapel of Saint Anthony
- Chapel of Saint Joseph
- Chapel of Saint Anna
- Chapel of Saint John

== Organ and music ==
The first organ was built in 1463 by Enrique de Colonia. In 1537, Martín de Córdoba built another organ with the intent to compete with the one at the La Seo.

Guillermo de Lupe and his son Gaudioso restructured the larger organ between 1595 and 1602; he had done the same for an organ in the Cathedral of the Savior of Zaragoza in 1577.

In 1657, there were several organs in the church, of many sizes and offering many possibilities. As a result, the musical activity reached a peak in the Spanish Golden Age; however, it began to decline toward the end of the 19th century.

In the Middle Ages, a minstrel accompanied singers with a dulcian. Polyphony in the Cathedral-Basilica of Our Lady of the Pillar was first documented in the mid-17th century, played by a "tenor" and a "contrabajón". In the late 1600s, an orchestra composed of minstrels agreed to work for the Church of Santa María la Mayor, the predecessor of the cathedral-basilica.

== El Pilar and Spanish identity ==
The feast of Our Lady of the Pillar, celebrating the first apparition of Mary to Hispanic people, is on October 12. This coincides with the Día de la Hispanidad and the date of Columbus's discovery of the New World. Every nation of Hispanic colonial origin has donated national vestments for the fifteenth-century statue of the Virgin, which is housed in the chapel. Pope John Paul II praised El Pilar as "Mother of the Hispanic Peoples" during both of his visits to the basilica. (Note: Pope John Paul II visited Zaragoza twice during his papacy: 31 October–9 November 1982 (including 11 other places in Spain) and 10–11 October 1984.)

It was declared Bien de Interés Cultural in 1904.

== See also ==
- Marian apparitions
- Roman Catholic Marian churches
- 12 Treasures of Spain
- List of Bien de Interés Cultural in the Province of Zaragoza
