= Diocese of Huesca =

Latin Catholic ecclesiastical territory in Spain

Coordinates: 42.1408°N 0.4086°W

Diocese of Huesca Dioecesis Oscensis Diócesis de Huesca

Catholic
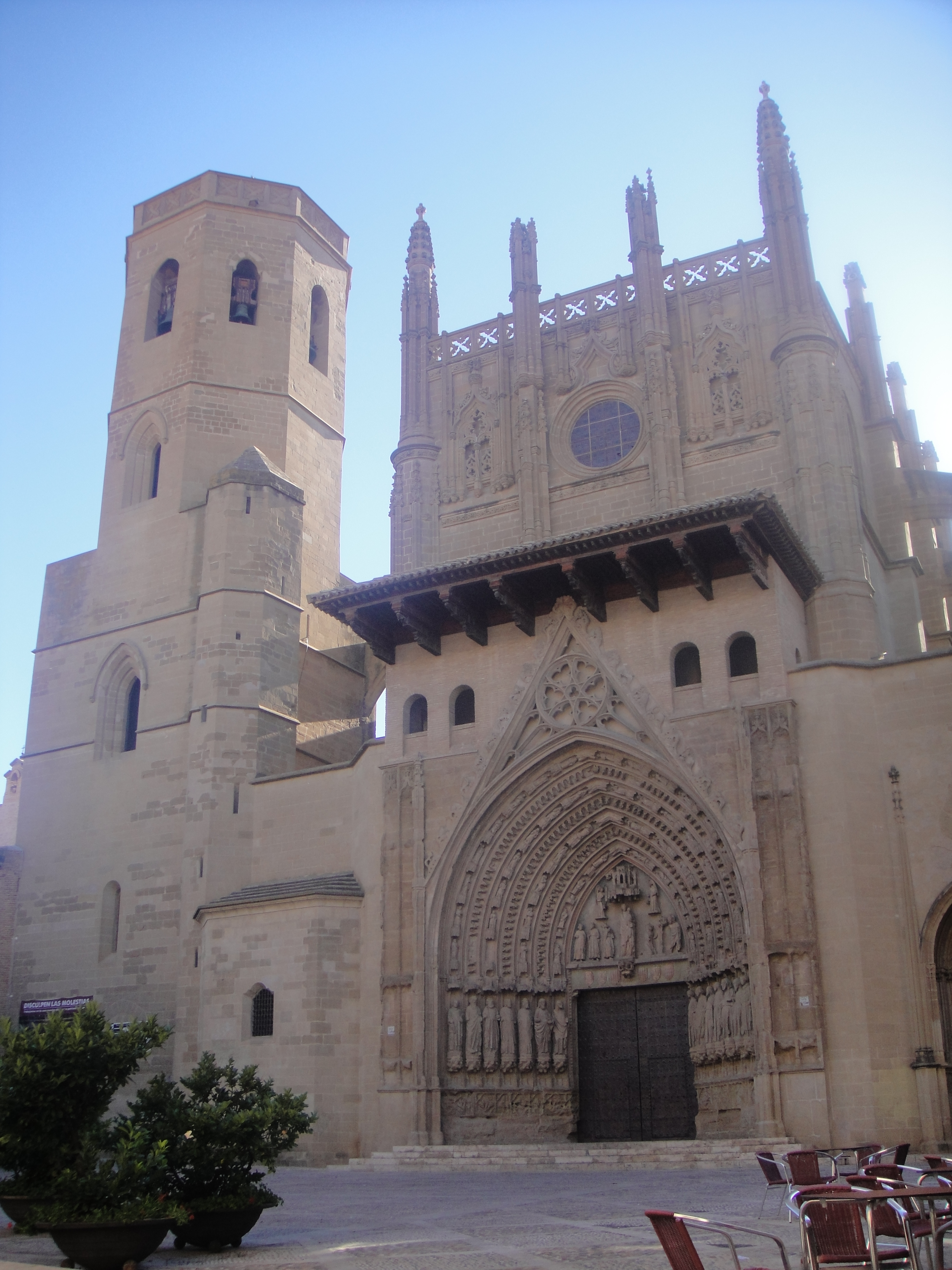
- Huesca Cathedral

Location
- Country: Spain
- Ecclesiastical province: Zaragoza

Statistics
- Area: 4,728 km^{2} (1,825 sq mi)
- Population: Total; Catholics: (as of 2006); 79,600; 78,600 (98.7%)

Information
- Denomination: Catholic Church
- Sui iuris church: Latin Church
- Rite: Roman Rite
- Established: 533
- Cathedral: Cathedral of Our Lady of Montserrat in Huesca

Current leadership
- Pope: Leo XIV
- Bishop: Pedro Aguado Cuesta, Sch.P.
- Metropolitan Archbishop: Carlos Manuel Escribano Subías

Website
- diocesisdehuesca.org

The Diocese of Huesca (Latin, Oscensis) is a Latin Church ecclesiastical territory or diocese of the Catholic Church located in north-eastern Spain, in the province of Huesca, part of the autonomous community of Aragón. The Diocese of Huesca is a suffragan diocese in the ecclesiastical province of the metropolitan Archdiocese of Zaragoza.

The diocese encompasses parts of the province of Huesca in north-eastern Spain, seven parishes in the Broto valley and three within the territorial limits of the Archdiocese of Saragossa, one parish being situated in the city of Saragossa itself.

The Diocese of Huesca was created in or before the 6th century; after the Moorish conquest of 713 its bishops moved to Aragon (the itinerant "Bishops of Aragon"). The episcopal seat was established in Jaca during 1063-1096, then finally moved back to Huesca after king Pedro I of Aragon took the city from the Moors in November 1096.

== History ==
=== Early history (c. 500 – 713) ===
The date of origin of the diocese cannot be definitely ascertained; the earliest evidence of its existence is the signature of Gabinius, Bishop of Huesca, to the decrees of the Third Council of Toledo, held in 589. Isidore of Seville, writing in the 7th century, mentions the presence of Elpidius, Bishop of Huesca, at an earlier council, but this is not considered authoritative. The year of the diocese being erected is given as 533.

A synod held in the diocese in 598 ordered annual diocesan conferences and enacted various disciplinary measures.

=== Itinerant bishops of Aragon (713–1063) ===
The Moorish invasion of 710 rapidly worked toward Huesca; when the city was taken in 713 the bishop fled, and the diocese was directed from Aragon by itinerant bishops, sometimes called bishops of Aragon, sometimes bishops of Huesca or Jaca, who lived either at Jaca or in the neighbouring monasteries of San Juan de la Peña, San Pedro de Siresa, and San Adrián de Sasabe.

Among the bishops of Aragon were:

- . c. 920 : Iñigo
- . c. 922 : Ferriolus
- 933–947 : Fortuño
- 971–978 : Aureolus
- . c. 981 : Atón
- 1011–1036 : Mancius
- 1036–1057 : García
- 1058–1075 : Sancho
- 1076–1086 : García Ramírez
- 1087–1097 : Peter

=== Jaca as seat of the bishops of Huesca (1063–1096) ===
A council held at Jaca in 1063 determined anew the boundaries of the Diocese of Huesca, which thereafter included the present dioceses of Huesca, Jaca, and Barbastro, as well as a part of the Diocese of Lérida. Jaca was then made the permanent seat of the diocese.

At the same time Sancho II was appointed Bishop of Huesca, and hastened to request the Pope Alexander II to confirm the decisions of the council. In the same year of 1063, however, King Sancho Ramirez of Aragon (1063-1094) had won back from the Moors the city of Barbastro, and had granted it to the Bishop of Roda. García Ramírez, the new Bishop of Huesca (1076–1086) and the king's brother, regarded this as an infringement of the rights of jurisdiction granted the Bishop of Jaca by the council of Jaca. He therefore renewed his petition to the new pope (Gregory VII) to have the decisions of the council confirmed, which request the pope granted . As, however, Bishop Raimundo of Roda also obtained the confirmation of all his privileges from Gregory, a violent dispute arose between the Bishops of Huesca and Roda as to jurisdiction over the churches of Barbastro, Bielsa, Gistao, and Alquezar, which in 1080 was decided by the king in favour of the Bishop of Roda.

=== Bishops' seat returns to Huesca (1096–present) ===
In November 1096, King Pedro I of Aragon took back Huesca from the Moors and restored the original see. Pope Urban II decreed (May 11, 1098) that, instead of Jaca, Huesca should again be the seat of the bishop, as it had been until the year 713 .

But Jaca itself had a separate existence under a vicar-general, independent of the Bishop of Huesca. It also retained its own cathedral chapter, which originally followed the Rule of St. Augustine, but in 1270 both this chapter and that of Huesca were secularized.

The history of the Diocese of Huesca is from this time on closely associated with that of the present Diocese of Barbastro.

The episcopal city of Huesca was long a centre for education and art. Ancient Osca was the seat of the famous school of Sertorius. After the failure of his plans at Perpignan, king Pedro IV of Aragon in 1354 established a university at Huesca, which was maintained by a tax laid on the city's food, and which pursued a steady if not a brilliant existence until it was eclipsed by the great college at Saragossa.

In 1571, the Diocese of Barbastro was erected out of part of Huesca. From 1848 to 1851 the See of Huesca was vacant. The Concordat of 1851 formally annexed Barbastro once more to Huesca, but preserving its name and administration, being administered by a vicar Apostolic.

== Population figures for the Diocese ==
In 1910 the Diocese of Huesca comprised 181 parishes and 15 subsidiary parishes, with 240 priests and 50 churches and chapels. It had a Catholic population of 87,659.

In 1950 there were 110,000 Catholics in the diocese. There were 196 parishes in the diocese. By 1980 there were 76,500 Catholics in the diocese, and it had 197 parishes. The year 1990 saw 82,500 Catholics and 210 parishes in the diocese. By 2004 there were 78,000 Catholics and 200 parishes.

== Bishops of Huesca ==
- c. 522–546 : Elpidius
- c. 546–556 : Pompeianus
- 557–576 : Vincent
- 576–600 : Gabinius
- --------------- : Ordulfus - (Mentioned between 633 and 638)
- --------------- : Eusebius - (Mentioned in 653)
- --------------- : Gadisclo - (Mentioned in 683)
- --------------- : Audebertus - (Mentioned in 693)

713–1096 : Huesca under Moorish rule.

- --------------- : Nitidius - (Late 8th century)
- --------------- : Frontinianus - (Early 9th century)

Among the bishops of Aragon were:

- . c. 920 : Iñigo
- . c. 922 : Ferriolus
- 933–947 : Fortuño
- 971–978 : Aureolus
- . c. 981 : Atón
- 1011–1036 : Mancius
- 1036–1057 : García
- 1058–1075 : Sancho
- 1076–1086 : García Ramírez
- 1087–1097 : Peter

1096 : Huesca conquered by king Peter I of Aragon.

1. 1097–1099 : Pedro
2. 1099–1130 : Esteban
3. 1130–1134 : Arnaldo Dodón
4. 1134–1160 : Dodón
5. --------- 1162 : Martín
6. 1166–1185 : Esteban de San Martín
7. 1187–1201 : Ricardo
8. 1201–1236 : García de Gúdal
9. 1238–1252 : Vidal de Canellas
10. 1253–1269 : Domingo de Solá
11. 1269–1273 : García Pérez de Zuazo
12. 1273–1290 : Jaime Sarroca
13. 1290–1300 : Ademar
14. 1300–1313 : Martín López de Azlor
15. 1313–1324 : Martín Oscabio
16. 1324–1328 : Gastón de Moncada
17. 1328–1336 : Pedro de Urrea
18. 1337–1345 : Bernardo Oliver
19. 1345–1348 : Gonzalo Zapata
20. 1348–1357 : Pedro Glascario
21. 1357–1361 : Guillermo de Torrellás
22. 1362–1364 : Bernardo Folcaut
23. 1364–1368 : Jimeno Sánchez de Ribabellosa
24. 1369–1372 : Juan Martínez
25. 1372–1383 : Fernando Pérez Muñoz
26. 1383–1384 : Berenguer de Anglesola
27. 1384–1393 : Francisco Riquer y Bastero
28. 1393–1403 : Juan de Baufés
29. 1403–1410 : Juan de Tauste
30. 1410–1415 : Domingo Ram y Lanaja
  - 1415–1421 : See vacant
31. 1421–1443 : Hugo de Urríes
32. 1443–1457 : Guillermo de Siscar
33. 1458–1465 : Guillermo Pons de Fenollet
34. 1470–1484 : Antonio de Espés
35. 1484–1526 : Juan de Aragón y de Navarra
36. --------- 1527 : Alonso de So de Castro y de Pinós
37. 1528–1529 : Diego de Cabrera
38. 1530–1532 : Lorenzo Campeggio
39. 1532–1534 : Jerónimo Doria
40. 1534–1544 : Martín de Gurrea
41. 1545–1572 : Pedro Agustín
42. 1572–1574 : Diego de Arnedo
43. 1577–1584 : Pedro del Frago
44. 1584–1593 : Martín de Cleriguech
45. 1594–1607 : Diego de Monreal
46. 1608–1615 : Berenguer de Bardaxí
47. 1616–1628 : Juan Moriz de Salazar
48. 1628–1641 : Francisco Navarro de Eugui
49. 1641–1654 : Esteban de Esmir
50. 1644–1670 : Fernando de Sada Azcona
51. 1671–1674 : Bartolomé de Fontcalda
52. 1677–1685 : Ramón de Azlor y Berbegal
53. 1686–1707 : Pedro de Gregorio Antillón
54. 1708–1714 : Francisco Garcés de Marcilla
55. 1714–1734 : Pedro Gregorio de Padilla
56. 1735–1736 : Lucas de Cuartas y Oviedo
57. 1738–1742 : Plácido Bailés Padilla
58. 1743–1775 : Antonio Sánchez Sardinero
59. 1776–1789 : Pascual López Estaún
60. 1790–1792 : Cayetano de la Peña Granada
61. 1793–1797 : Juan Armada Araujo
62. 1797–1809 : Joaquín Sánchez de Cutanda
63. 1815–1832 : Eduardo Sáenz de la Guardia
64. 1833–1845 : Lorenzo Ramón Lahoz
  - 1848–1851 : See vacant
65. 1851–1861 : Pedro José de Zarandia
66. 1861–1870 : Basilio Gil Bueno
67. 1875–1886 : Honorio María de Onaindía
68. 1888–1895 : Vicente Alda Sancho
69. 1895–1918 : Mariano Supervía Lostalé, (or Mariano Supervía y Lostalé)
70. 1918–1922 : Zacarías Martínez Núñez
71. 1922–1934 : Mateo Colom Canals
72. 1935–1973 : Lino Rodrigo Ruesca
  - 1965–1969 : Jaime Flores Martín - (Apostolic Administrator)
  - -------- 1969 : Damián Iguacén Borau - (Apostolic Administrator)
  - 1969–1977 : Javier Osés Flamarique - (Apostolic Administrator)
73. 1977–2001 : Javier Osés Flamarique
  - 2001–2003 : Juan José Omella Omella - (Apostolic Administrator)
74. 2003–2009 : Jesús Sanz Montes

== See also ==
- Huesca Cathedral
- List of the Roman Catholic dioceses of Spain

== Sources ==
- (in Spanish) IBERCRONOX: Obispado de Huesca (Osca) and Obispado de Aragón, geocities.com. Accessed 5 March 2024.
- (in Spanish) Official Diocese of Huesca website
