= Synod of Jaca (1063) =

Synod of Jaca,1063

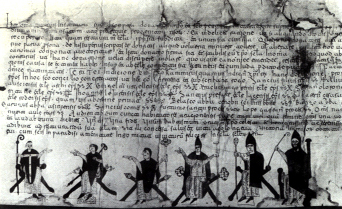
A copy of the acta of the synod of Jaca. Now in the Archivo Capitular, Huesca.

In 1063, at the Synod of Jaca, under the auspices of King Ramiro I of Aragon and the presidency of the Archbishop of Auch, the ancient diocese of Huesca, whose seat was under Muslim Zaragozan control, was reestablished in the town of Jaca, which became "an instant city". Besides the archbishop of Auch, Austind, the synod was attended by other prelates of Gascony, Navarre and Aragon. Much of Jaca's early settlers were Gascons at this time. The synod determined the boundaries of the diocese, both present and future, that is, after its reconquista. Much of the new territory was taken at the expense of the diocese of Roda, whose bishop, Raymond, later litigated over Alquézar. It placed the canons of Jaca under the Augustinian Rule, and also introduced that rule into the royal chapels of Siresa, Loarre, Montearagón and Alquézar. Unspecified reform was introduced into the monasteries of San Juan de la Peña and San Victorián de Huesca, and the Roman Rite replaced the old Visigothic liturgy. A new, eclectic cathedral, San Pedro Apóstol, was consecrated in Jaca.

At the synod, the king of Aragon promised the church of Jaca a thirtieth of all royal revenue from Christian and Muslim tributaries (tributarii), which at the time included the parias from Zaragoza and Tudela:

We also give and concede to God and the blessed fisherman [Peter] a tenth of all our own gold, silver, grain and wine, as well as, among other things, whatever our tributaries, either freely or by force, give to us, both Christian and Saracen, from all the villages and castles in the mountains and the plains within prescribed boundaries ... In addition, from one of the tributes that we either receive presently or should receive in the future, by God's mercy, from Zaragoza and Tudela, we concede and donate a third part of the tenth of it to the aforementioned church and bishop.

Shortly after the synod, Ramiro went on campaign and died at the battle of Graus (3 May).

The authenticity of the council's acta, the principal source for the event, has been questioned by Antonio Durán Gudiol, who by extension has questioned the existence of the council itself. The acta are preserved in fifteen copies in the archives of the cathedrals of Jaca and Santa María de Huesca, several of them of high artistic value (de alto valor artístico). Durán Gudiol argues that the "acta" are in fact a heavily redacted record of a grant by the king and his son, Sancho, to the church of Jaca.

== Attendees ==
The following is a list of known attendees who confirmed the acta:

- King Ramiro I of Aragon
- Archbishop Austind of Auch
- Bishop Guillem Guifré of Urgell
- Bishop Heraclius I of Tarbes
- Bishop Stephen of Oloron
- Bishop Gomesano of Calahorra
- Bishop John II of Pamplona
- Bishop Sancho of Huesca, whose see was being transferred to Jaca
- Bishop Paterno of Zaragoza
- Bishop Arnulf I of Roda.
- Abbot Blasco of San Juan de la Peña
- Abbot Banzo of San Andrés de Fanio
- Abbot Garuso of San Victorián de Huesca
- Infante Sancho Ramírez, the king's legitimate son (infante) and heir
- Count Sancho Ramírez, the king's illegitimate son
- Count Sancho Galíndez
- Fortuño Sánchez
- Lope Garcés
- some nutriti aule regie, noble youths raised at the royal court

== Sources ==
- Arroyo Ilera, Fernando (1969). "El dominio territorial del obispado de Roda (siglo XI y XII)". Hispania Sacra. 22 (43): 69–128.
- Balaguer, Federico (1951). "Los límites del obispado de Aragón y el concilio de Jaca de 1063". Estudios de Edad Media de la Corona de Aragán. 4: 69–138.
- Bishko, Charles J. (1980). "Fernando I and the Origins of the Leonese–Castilian Alliance with Cluny". Studies in Medieval Spanish Frontier History. London: Variorum Reprints. [Originally published in Cuadernos de Historia de España 47 (1968): 31–135 and 48 (1969): 30–116.]
- Bisson, Thomas N. (2000). The Medieval Crown of Aragon: A Short History. Oxford: Clarendon Press.
- Buesa Conde, Domingo J. (1991). "Actas del Concilio de Jaca". El espejo de nuestra historia: La diócesis de Zaragoza a través de los siglos. Zaragoza: Archdiocese of Zaragoza.
- Bull, Marcus Graham (1993). Knightly Piety and the Lay Response to the First Crusade: The Limousin and Gascony, c. 970 – c. 1130. Oxford: Clarendon Press.
- Durán Gudiol, Antonio (1978). Ramiro I de Aragón. Zaragoza: Guara Editorial.
- Sangorrín y Diest-Garcés, Dámaso (1979). El Libro de la Cadena del Concejo de Jaca: Documentos reales, episcopales y municipales de los siglos X, XI, XII, XIII y XIV. Coleccián de documentos para el estudio del historia de Aragón. Vol. XII. Zaragoza: Heraldo de Aragón.
- Sarasa Sánchez, Esteban (1993). "Concejos y ciudades del Camino de Santiago en Aragón y Navarra: Del crecimiento a la crisis". In Cid Priego, Carlos (ed.). Las artes en los caminos de Santiago. Oviedo: Universidad de Oviedo. pp. 233–50.
- Smith, Damian J. (2004). Innocent III and the Crown of Aragon: The Limits of Papal Authority. Aldershot: Ashgate.
