= Bernard Oliver =

Bernard Oliver may refer to:

- Bernard M. Oliver (1916–1995), scientist, founder of Hewlett-Packard laboratories
- Bernard Oliver, 17 year old victim of an unsolved murder in England from January 1967

== See also ==
- Bernat Oliver (died 1348), Spanish bishop
- Olivier Bernard (disambiguation)
