= Olivier Bernard (disambiguation) =

Olivier Bernard may refer to:

- Olivier Bernard (born 1979), French footballer
- Olivier Bernard (athlete) (1921-1967), French hurdler
- Olivier Bernard (pharmacist) (born 1982), Canadian science communicator

== See also ==
- Bernard Oliver, (disambiguation)
