= Blasco Gardéliz de Ezcároz =

Blasco Gardéliz de Ezcároz was the bishop of Pamplona (as Blasco II) (Note: His name may also be spelled Belasco or Blas. His name combines a patronymic surname indicating that his father was Gardelio and a toponymic indicating he or his family came from Ezcároz. In contemporary documents, Ezcároz may be spelled Escaloz. On naming, see Lidia Becker, Hispano-romanisches Namenbuch (Niemeyer, 2009).) from 1068 until 1078 or 1079. He was the prior of the monastery of San Salvador de Leire from 1054 until his election as bishop. Although the bishops of Pamplona had held the abbacy of Leire since the time of Sancho the Great (died 1035), this tradition was broken when Blasco became bishop. The monastery went instead to Fortunio, the bishop of Álava, in 1068.

During Blasco's episcopate, King Sancho IV of Navarre re-established the primacy of the diocese of Pamplona in Navarre over that of Nájera. According to the Crónica de los reyes de Navarra of Prince Charles of Viana (died 1461), Sancho "gave great gifts to [the cathedral of] Santa María de Pamplona and to Bishop Don Blasco."

In 1076, Sancho IV was assassinated and Álava was annexed by Castile. As a result, Fortunio was deprived of Leire and Blasco became abbot. He was thus the last abbot–bishop to hold both offices until his death. His successor, García Ramírez, was deprived of the abbacy before being also deposed as bishop, and they were never united again.

== See also ==
- Catholic Church in Spain

== Sources ==
- Carl, Carolina (2011). A Bishopric Between Three Kingdoms: Calahorra, 1045–1190. Leiden: Brill.
- Fortún Pérez de Ciriza, Luis Javier (2005). "Monjes y obispos: la Iglesia en el reinado de García Sánchez III el de Nájera". In José Ignacio de la Iglesia Duarte (ed.). García Sánchez III "el de Nájera": un rey y un reino en la Europa del siglo XI. Logroño. pp. 191–252.
- Lapeña Paúl, Ana Isabel (2004). Sancho Ramírez: Rey de Aragón (1064?–1094) y rey de Navarra (1076–1094). Ediciones Trea.
- Ubieto Arteta, Antonio (1948). "La introducción del Rito romano en Aragón y Navarra". Hispania Sacra. 1 (2): 299–324.
