= Sancho (bishop of Jaca) =

Sancho was the first bishop of Jaca from 1063 until 1074/76. He was formally the bishop of Huesca until the synod of Jaca transferred the ancient diocese of Huesca to the city of Jaca in 1063. In fact, Jaca was a very small city and the bishop's actual seat was the monastery of San Adrián de Sasave.

In 1074, Sancho traveled to Rome to seek a papal dispensation to retire, citing physical infirmity. Given that he had personally undertaken the long journey to Rome, it is most likely that he was physically well and that his removal was sought by King Sancho I for political reasons. By October 1076, the king's brother García was bishop of Jaca.

== Sources ==
- Nelson, Lynn H. (1978). "The Foundation of Jaca (1076): Urban Growth in Early Aragon". Speculum. 53 (4): 688–708. doi:10.2307/2849781. JSTOR 2849781. S2CID 154602626.
