= García Ramírez (bishop) =

Aragonese prelate

García Ramírez (died 17 July 1086) was an Aragonese prelate and infante. He served as the bishop of Jaca, then the only diocese in Aragon, from 1076 until his death. He temporarily served as the bishop of Pamplona, the principal diocese of neighbouring Navarre, from 1078 until 1082. He was a younger son of King Ramiro I of Aragon and Queen Ermesinda and thus a brother of King Sancho Ramírez. He had good relations with King Alfonso VI of León and Pope Gregory VII, both of whom took his side when he was involved in a dispute with his brother.

== Ecclesiastical reforms in Jaca ==
García was illiterate, and his assumption of episcopal office had more to do with high politics than religion. The diocese of Aragon was an itinerant see, with its de facto seat at the monastery of San Adrián de Sasave, prior to the election of García. In 1074, Bishop Sancho traveled to Rome to seek a papal dispensation to retire, citing physical infirmity. Given that he had personally undertaken the long journey to Rome, it is most likely that his removal was sought by the king for political reasons. By October 1076, García was bishop with his seat at Jaca, which had been the main seat of the rulers of Aragon for centuries. Within a year, a new cathedral in the Romanesque style was under construction.

García worked with his brother, King Sancho, to reduce the influence of the secular clergy. To this end, he introduced the Augustinian rule into the chapter of the new cathedral, and with it the Roman Rite. These reforms, although intended merely to increase the relative power of the bishop and king, converged with the wider Gregorian reforms promoted by the pope.

== Falling out with Sancho ==
According to an early twelfth-century account in the archives of the cathedral of Huesca, at some point in the early 1080s García and his brother had a falling-out. Sancho transferred some churches belonging of the diocese of Jaca to the diocese of Roda under Bishop Raymond Dalmatius. García was then accused of trying to betray the castle of Alquézar into the hands of the king of León. After two or three years, while Alfonso was besieging Zaragoza in the summer of 1086, García complained to him of his mistreatment by Sancho. Alfonso promised to give García the archbishopric of Toledo with an endowment capable of supporting one thousand knights. This late account probably contains a kernel of truth, but its details are not reliable. (Note: Alquézar, for example, would not have been of any strategic interest to Alfonso; an offer of Toledo would have made no sense after 15 February 1086, by which time an archbishop, Bernard of Palencia, had already been elected; and the 1,000 knights is a clear exaggeration.) The historian Ramón Menéndez Pidal believed that García, Sancho and Alfonso reconciled at the siege of Zaragoza.

In a letter to Gregory, García fabricated the story of his father submitting his kingdom to the Papacy and promising an annual tribute. In fact, his brother Sancho was the first Aragonese king to make this arrangement with the Papacy. The reason for García's calumny—which implied that his brother had not upheld Ramiro's tributary obligation—are unknown, but it was treated as fact by Gregory. García gave the same story to Alfonso VI of León in 1086.

== Control of Pamplona ==
About García's brief control of Pamplona, the capital of the kingdom of Navarre, the historian José Goñi Gaztambide writes, "the see of Pamplona had never fallen so low." In 1076, Sancho succeeded to Navarre after the death of his cousin, King Sancho IV. In 1078, Blasco II, bishop of Pamplona and abbot of Leire, died. Sancho installed his brother as both bishop and abbot. Documents confirm that García was abbot of Leire in 1079–80, the last bishop of Pamplona to hold this abbatial office at the same time. There is no evidence García moved to introduce the Gregorian reform into Pamplona, but he may have introduced the Roman rite. By 1082, during his dispute with Sancho, the king gave the administration of the diocese and its revenues to their sister, Sancha, wife of Count Ermengol III of Urgell. She managed it until the election of a new bishop (Pedro de Roda) in 1083. García was replaced at Leire by Abbot Raymond.

== Sources ==
- "García Ramírez". Gran Enciclopedia Navarra.
- Lapeña Paúl, Ana Isabel (2004). Sancho Ramírez: Rey de Aragón (1064?–1094) y rey de Navarra (1076–1094). Ediciones Trea.
- Linehan, Peter (1993). History and Historians of Medieval Spain. Oxford University Press.
- Nelson, Lynn H. (1978). "The Foundation of Jaca (1076): Urban Growth in Early Aragon". Speculum. 53 (4): 688–708. doi:10.2307/2849781. JSTOR 2849781. S2CID 154602626.
- Reilly, Bernard F. (1988). The Kingdom of León-Castilla Under King Alfonso VI, 1065–1109. Princeton University Press.
- Ubieto Arteta, Antonio (1948). "La introducción del Rito romano en Aragón y Navarra". Hispania Sacra. 1 (2): 299–324.
