= Pedro Agustín =

Spanish Catholic bishop

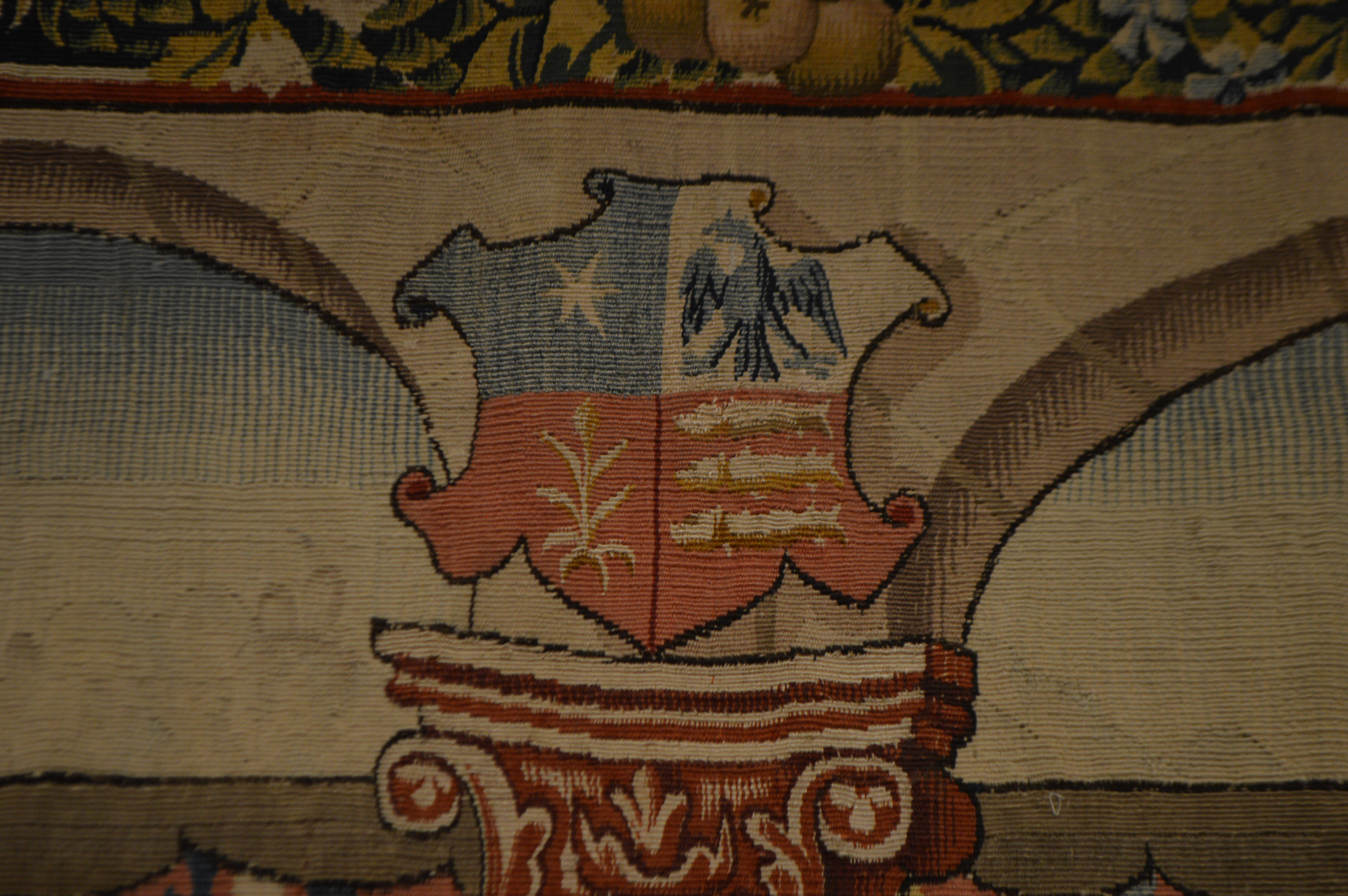
- Arms of Pedro Agustin y Albanell
- Born: February 22, 1512
- Died: February 26, 1572 (aged 60)

Bishop Pedro Agustin y Albanell (February 22, 1512 – February 26, 1572) was a Spanish Catholic bishop. He served as both Bishop of the Roman Catholic Diocese of Elne (now Roman Catholic Diocese of Perpignan-Elne) in France and of the Roman Catholic Diocese of Huesca in Spain.

Agustin was appointed Bishop of Elne in 1543. In 1545 he was appointed bishop of Huesca. He died while in office.
