= Bernat Oliver =

Valencian theologian, diplomat, and bishop

Bernat Oliver (died 14 July 1348), in Spanish Bernardo Oliver, was a Valencian theologian, diplomat and bishop.

Oliver joined the Augustinian Order before 1310. Educated in theology and philosophy at Paris, he took up a professorship in his native Valencia in 1320. By 1329 he was the senior Augustinian in the Crown of Aragon. From about this time he served successive kings of Aragon as a diplomat to the Holy See and France. He also served several popes as a diplomat, spending much of his time in Avignon. In 1337, he became bishop of Huesca, was transferred to the diocese of Barcelona in 1345 and transferred again to Tortosa in 1346. Although recommended for a cardinalate, he was never appointed. He was a victim of the Black Death.

Oliver left behind a substantial corpus of writings. Some four sermons he preached and several documents associated with his rule as bishop survive. His theological writings, infused with learning, touch on the Jews, the Bible and the decretals, but he is mainly remembered as the most important exponent of Augustinian mysticism in Spain through his Excitatorium mentis ad Deum.

== Life ==
=== Augustinian, teacher, diplomat ===
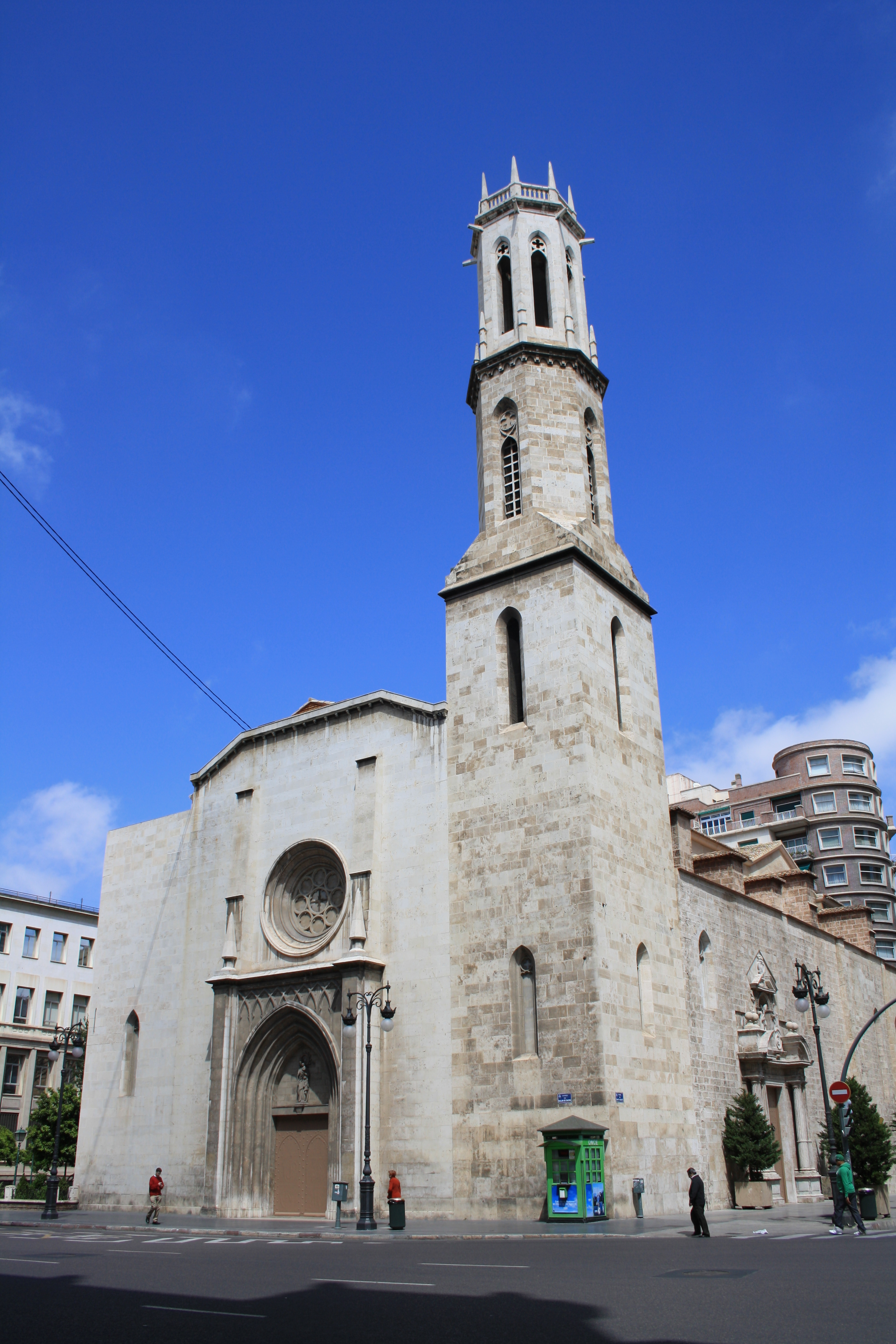
Church of Saint Augustine in Valencia

Born in the late 13th century to a prominent family in Valencia, Oliver's parents obtained for him an education in grammar and Latin. Sometime before 1310, he became an Augustinian canon at the Church of Saint Augustine in Valencia. He then went to the University of Paris to study theology and philosophy, obtaining his doctorate and subsequently a teaching position.

Oliver returned to Valencia in or shortly before 1320 and received a chair teaching the Sentences of Peter Lombard at the local studium (the forerunner of the University of Valencia). In 1320, he was named prior of the Augustinians of Valencia. (Note: He was never named auxiliary bishop of Valencia, as some authors maintain.) He was promoted to definitor and then, on 7 October 1329, superior of the province of Aragon, according to the contemporary Augustinian historian Jordan of Quedlinburg.

Oliver first began to work for the Aragonese crown in the early 1330s, when he served as King Alfonso IV's envoy to Pope John XXII. Since this fell during the Avignon Papacy, he spent these years in Avignon. On Saint Augustine's Day (28 August) 1331, he preached a sermon before John and the College of Cardinals. On Passion Sunday (13 March) 1334, he preached again before pope and cardinals. In 1333 and again in 1336, he was among those theologians called upon to examine the pope's controversial theology of beatific vision.

=== Bishop of Huesca ===
On 1 October 1337, Pope Benedict XII appointed him bishop of Huesca and Jaca. He was the first Augustinian bishop in Spain. On 30 October, the pope gave him the right to receive episcopal consecration at the hands of a bishop of his choosing. In September 1340, Oliver visited the cathedral of Jaca to establish regulations for its governance and afterwards convoked a diocesan synod at Huesca.

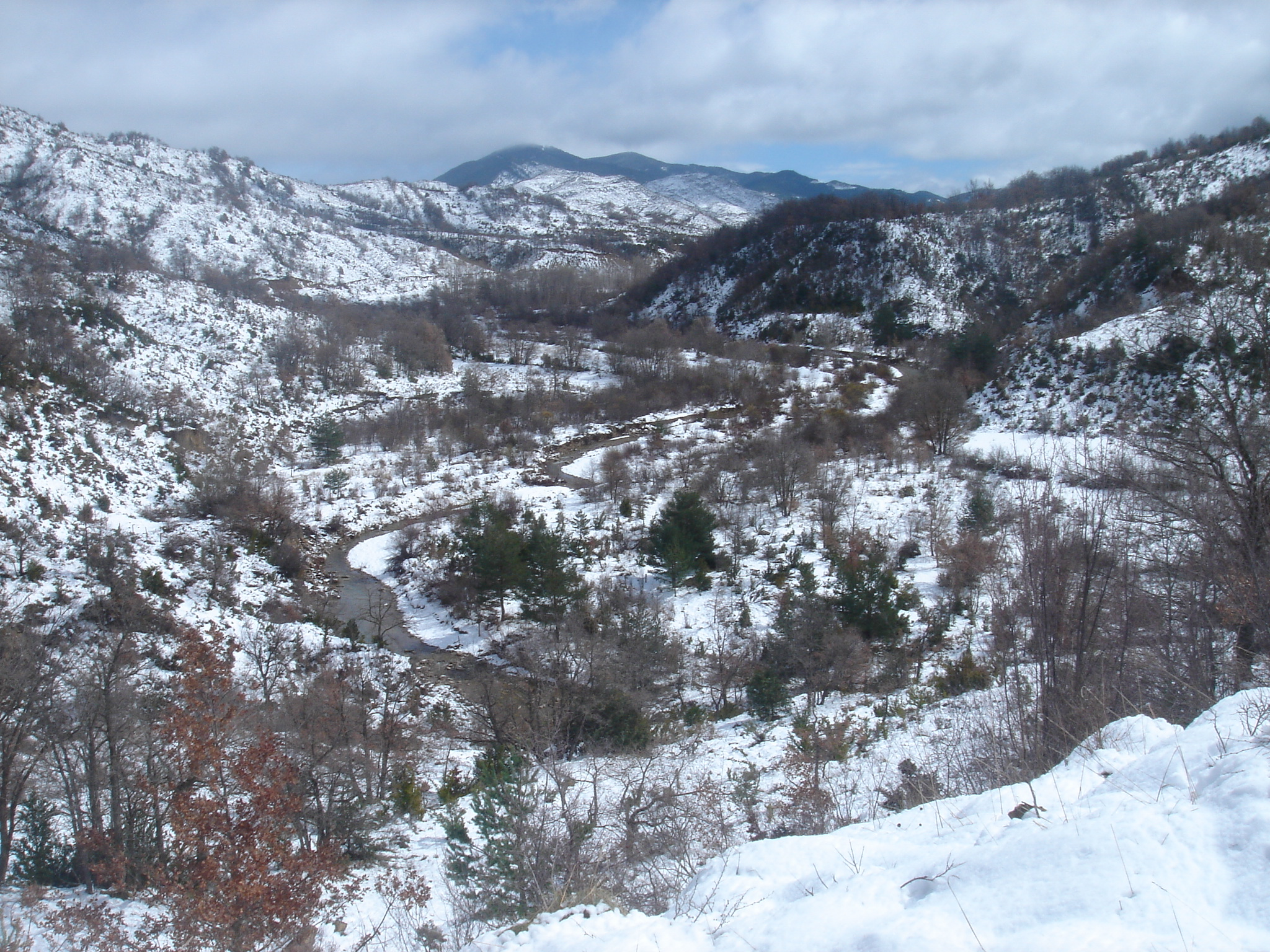
The contested valley of Onsella

In July 1341, Oliver was dispatched by King Peter IV to negotiate with King James III of Majorca and his ally, King Philip VI of France, to prevent a war between Aragon and Majorca. He was back in Spain to attend a provincial synod in Zaragoza in April 1342. At the synod, he raised the issue of the archdeaconry of the valley of Onsella, which belonged to Huesca but was in the possession of the diocese of Pamplona. He returned to Avignon in 1343, but Pope Clement VI sent him back on a diplomatic mission to Peter IV with Cardinal Bernard d'Albi. In 1345, Peter IV asked the pope to make Oliver a cardinal as a reward for his peacemaking efforts between Aragon and Majorca, but to no avail. In the Chronicle that Peter IV wrote, he praises him as "one of the greatest masters of theology then in the world". (Note: Catalan: "un dels mellors maestres en teologia qui llavors fos en lo món".)

=== Barcelona and Tortosa ===
On 12 January 1345, while Oliver was in Avignon, Clement translated him from Huesca to Barcelona. Oliver was still in Avignon on 21 March (Feast of Saint Benedict), when he preached a sermon in front of the pope. (Note: This sermon may have been preached on 21 March 1346.) He sent a procurator to take possession of the see on his behalf and did not arrive in Barcelona in person until 16 June. He swore to uphold the diocesan constitution the following day. In July, he dealt with some controversies regarding the practice of apostolic poverty at the Franciscan convent in Vilafranca del Penedès. On 19 August 1345, he held a diocesan synod at which he promulgated a new constitution. On 13 April 1346, he named procurators, Antoni de Colell and Domènec Martínez, to undertake his ad limina visitation. His tenure at Barcelona was short. On 26 June 1346, Clement again translated him, this time to Tortosa.

Oliver arrived in Tortosa on 12 August 1346. On 21 May 1347, he laid the cornerstone of the current cathedral of Tortosa. On 28 May, with the cooperation of the cathedral chapter, he promulgated a new diocesan constitution with a pastoral focus.

In early 1348, the government of the Principality of Catalonia sent him as their emissary to negotiate between the Union of Valencia and the crown to prevent a civil war in the Crown of Aragon. He fell ill with bubonic plague on his return journey. He died on 14 July 1348, a victim of the Black Death. He was buried in the chapel of Saint Candida in the cathedral of Tortosa.

== Writings ==
Oliver wrote in Latin. While in Paris, he wrote the Tractatus contra caecitatem iudeorum (Note: "Treatise Against the Hardening of the Jews") in 1317. It is designed as an aid to the catechesis of the Jews. It contains rigorous arguments, syllogistic reasoning and citations of the Bible, Aristotle, Josephus, Origen, Isidore of Seville and Maimonides. It was one of his most popular works and survives in twelve manuscripts. It is, however, unoriginal and dispassionately argued, and shows a poor understanding of the Rabbinic Jewish view of the Torah. The anti-Jewish Pope Benedict XIII owned two copies, and it may have an influence on the Disputation of Tortosa.

During his professorship at Valencia in the 1320s, Oliver wrote a commentary on the Sentences in four books. His most famous work, written at an unknown date and location, is Excitatorium mentis ad Deum (Note: "Stimulation of the Mind to God") in the tradition of Christian mysticism. Its model is the Confessions of Augustine of Hippo and it is very unlike his scholastic works. It was translated into Catalan sometime before 1417. The original Latin, the Catalan translation and a modern Spanish translation have been published.

Besides the three aforementioned sermons, which have been preserved, Oliver wrote several theological, mystical and Biblical treatises, many of them still unpublished:

- Contra perfidiam Iudeorum (Note: "Against the Perfidy of the Jews")
- Super caput cum Marthe de celebratione missarum (Note: "About the Decretal Cum Marthae Regarding the Celebration of Mass")
- Quaestiones quodlibetales (Note: "Quodlibetal Questions")
- De divinis officiis (Note: "On the Divine Offices")
- Diatriba contra iudeos (Note: "Diatribe Against the Jews")
- Contiones ad populum valentinum (Note: "Address to the People of Valencia")
- Speculum animae (Note: "Mirror of the Soul")
- Tractatus contra antichristum (Note: "Treatise Against the Antichrist")
- Tractatus de inquisitione Antichristi, (Note: "Treatise on the Search for the Antichrist") the attribution of this work is suspect
- Concordantiae decretorum cum Biblia, "a concordance of the Decretum with biblical passages"
- Expositio Canonis Missae (Note: "Exposition on the Canons of the Mass")
- Expositio in capitulum cum Marthae de celebratione Missarum (Note: "Exposition on the Decretal Cum Marthae Regarding the Celebration of Mass")
- Sermo qui legit, intellegat (Note: "Sermon [on] 'Let him who reads understand'")
- Espertamiento de la voluntad de Dios, (Note: "Awakening of the Will of God") a text which only survives in a Spanishs translation made by Diego Ordóñez and known from a single manuscript in the Escorial dated 1478
