= Raymond of Roda =

11th-century bishop of Roda

Raymond Dalmatius (died 1095), known in Spanish as Raimundo (or Ramón) Dalmacio, was the bishop of Roda from 1076 until his death. He was the last bishop at Roda de Isábena before the see was moved to Barbastro and his episcopate was "key in the development of the dominion of the diocese, with respect to both ecclesiastical jurisdiction and the formation of an ecclesial territory."

Raymond came to power at Roda by a special dispensation from Pope Gregory VII, who deposed his predecessor, Bishop Solomon, at the insistence of King Sancho V of Navarre and Aragon. The reasons for Solomon's fall from favour are unclear, but it may have been that he was a Catalan and his loyalty in the disputes between the County of Ribagorza, which lay within Roda's diocese and Sancho's kingdom, and the neighbouring County of Pallars, which was within the sphere of influence of the Count of Barcelona, was suspect. It may also have been that Solomon did not press the claims of Roda to territory taken away from it at the Council of Jaca (1063) as forcefully as the king would have liked. At the time, the beneficiary of the territorial adjustments of 1063 was the king's brother, García, bishop of Jaca, with whom the king was often at odds. With his own candidate, Raymond, as bishop and his own son, Pedro Sánchez, as count in Ribagorza, the king could expect to win his dispute with the counts of Pallars.

Raymond pursued his diocese's claims on Sobrarbean territory. He also expanded the holdings of the cathedral of Roda and increased its economic clout in the city and its environs. The claims of the diocese of Urgell to supremacy over Roda were finally decided in the latter's favour during Raymond's tenure, but he was left with boundary disputes between the two sees. In later legends, Raymond is said to have moved the seat of the diocese to Lleida or Hictosa, identified either with Tolva or an ancient suburb of Barbastro.

In the dispute with Jaca, Raymond's first claim was to the city and church of Alquézar, which was one of the best fortified towns in the region. Raymond was also given jurisdiction by the king over churches that had been previously confirmed to the bishop of Jaca by the council of 1063, including in the town Espluga, the valleys of Arravense and Castillo Vivo and castles of Castejón andCorbera. Raymond also received for his church the right to cut wood in the royal forests (15 March 1081), and from both King Sancho and his son, Count Pedro, received the right to pasturage far from their own church lands. The church under Raymond experienced economic growth, buying up vineyards and houses in the vicinities of Roda, Lastonosa, Ibuni, Monzón and Riberas del Cinca. To curb abuses among his priests, Raymond instituted a canonical rule in the cathedral and forbade the priests to own private property.

In 1084 he was captured at the battle of Morella, while supporting the king of Aragon and the taifa of Lérida against the taifa of Zaragoza. The latter's forces were led at the time by Rodrigo Díaz de Vivar, the Cid of legend.

== Sources ==
- Arroyo Ilera, Fernando (1969). "El dominio territorial del obispado de Roda (siglo XI y XII)". Hispania Sacra. 22 (43): 69–128.
- Goering, Joseph (2009). "Bishops, Law, and Reform in Aragon, 1076–1126, and the Liber Tarraconensis". Zeitschrift der Savigny-Stiftung für Rechtsgeschichte: Kanonistische Abteilung. 95: 1–28.
- Martínez Diez, Gonzalo (1999). El Cid histórico: un estudio exhaustivo sobre el verdadero Rodrigo Díaz de Vivar. Editorial Planeta.
