= Huesca Cathedral =

Roman Catholic cathedral in Spain

- Cathedral of the Transfiguration of the Lord
- Catedral de la Transfiguración del Señor
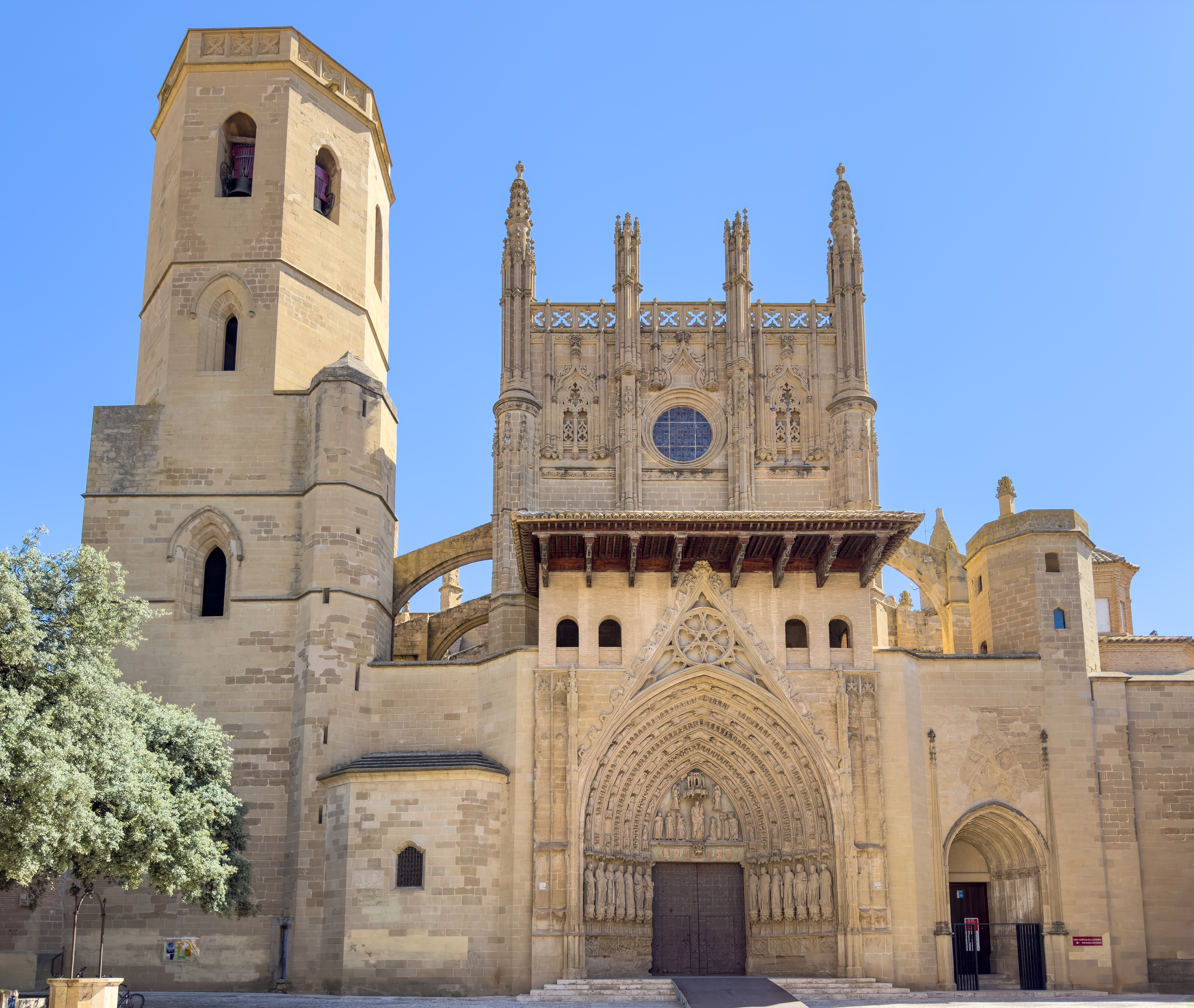
- South façade in 2024
- Huesca Cathedral
- 42°8′26″N 0°24′29″W
- Location: Huesca
- Address: Plaza de la Catedral
- Country: Spain
- Denomination: Catholic

History
- Former name: Cathedral of Jesus of Nazareth
- Status: Cathedral
- Dedication: Transfiguration of Jesus

Architecture
- Style: Gothic
- Years built: 13th—16th century

Administration
- Metropolis: Zaragoza
- Diocese: Huesca

Clergy
- Bishop: Vicente Jiménez Zamora (Apostolic administrator)

Spanish Cultural Heritage
- Type: Non-movable
- Criteria: Monument
- Designated: 3 June 1931
- Reference no.: RI-51-0000626

The Cathedral of the Transfiguration of the Lord, also known as the Cathedral of Saint Mary, is a Roman Catholic church in Huesca, in Aragon, north-eastern Spain. It is the seat of the Bishop of Huesca. Its architecture is Gothic, and its construction began in the late 13th century and was finished in the early 16th century.

== Construction ==
The project of building the Cathedral of Huesca was initiated during the time of James I of Aragon (1213–1276), which is rather late when compared to other churches in the area, which date back to the Romanesque period. This is because in Huesca, Christian worship took place for almost two centuries in the mosque building, until the late 13th century. As the newly consecrated bishop of Huesca, the nephew of James I (James Sarroca), the king considered Christian worship in the mosque inappropriate. So in 1273, he proposed the building of a new gothic cathedral, which was on the increase in Europe, on top of the old mosque (of which just a horseshoe arch in the cloister area, which could have been used entry to the minaret tower of the mosque). But several lawsuits delayed the start of construction until 1294. The initial design proposed a construction of three naves, with five chapels at the front and a transept.

Situated next to the old mosque the Wasqah Taifa, it came up in the 12th century. The small Romanesque church was dedicated to Saint Mary of Joy. It comprises a frame with three archivolts: a segmented interior and external columns at the entrance. The innermost archivolt is decorated with Zamoran coils. Alight by a pair of two pairs of pilasters and chapels, with their corresponding shafts, with simple interior decoration. A part of the original Romanesque cloister is attached to the north side of the temple of which only the north and east bays and the southern part remain. The west bay was destroyed to build the Gothic cloister of Pope Luna, extending the south and north bays of the Romanesque.

The general design of the temple consists of a Latin cross with side chapels and three naves of four sections as well as the transept.

The front was built with five apses between 1294 and 1309. The north wall of the transept was also constructed, with its round-arched doorway the annexe, which was used for the vestry (the "Old Sacristy) and for archiving. Construction of the lateral naves took place between 1296 and 1304 Later he built the side chapels by his own initiative.

Between 1327 and 1348 the simple groin vaults in the side naves were put up and the central nave and the transept were covered with a wooden roof. The front of the cathedral, which is the work of the builder Guillem Inglés is an outstanding piece of Gothic sculpture. Consisting of seven archivolts that are home to sixteen figures, fourteen virgins, ten angels and eight prophets. The typanum is dominated by a statue of the Virgin and Child, and the sides by the Magi and the resurrected Christ with Mary Magdalene.

In the same period of the 15th century, thanks to the initiative of Pope Luna, Benedict XIII, part of a Gothic cloister was created, with the aim of restoring and replacing the old Romanesque one. The only part that was actually built was the corridor on the south side. The rest is now incomplete in what is now the Medieval Art Hall of the Cathedral Museum.

At the beginning of 1520, Damian Forment was commissioned to erect the cathedral's main altarpiece. Made of alabaster, the body is a large triptych of three scenes depicting the Passion of Christ.

== Bell tower and spire ==
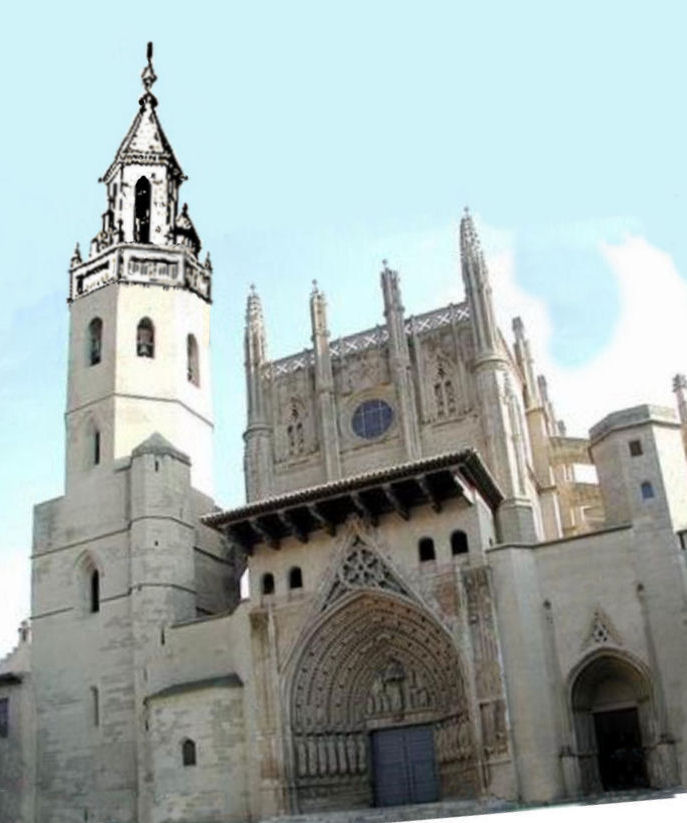
Idealized reconstruction of the spire.

The bell tower was built between 1369 and 1423, first time up four floors. This was by the contractors Juan de Alguiñero and Juan de Quadros, and in its last stage of building, Pere Jalopa completed it, topping the tower with a beautiful pentagonal spire. Unfortunately this disappeared during the Republican siege of the city during the Spanish Civil War of 1936. This beautiful spire tower that used to rise one third higher than its current height, for various reasons has not been reconstructed. However, there are plans for a rebuilding project, restoring the cathedral's imposing stature that it once had.

== Gallery ==
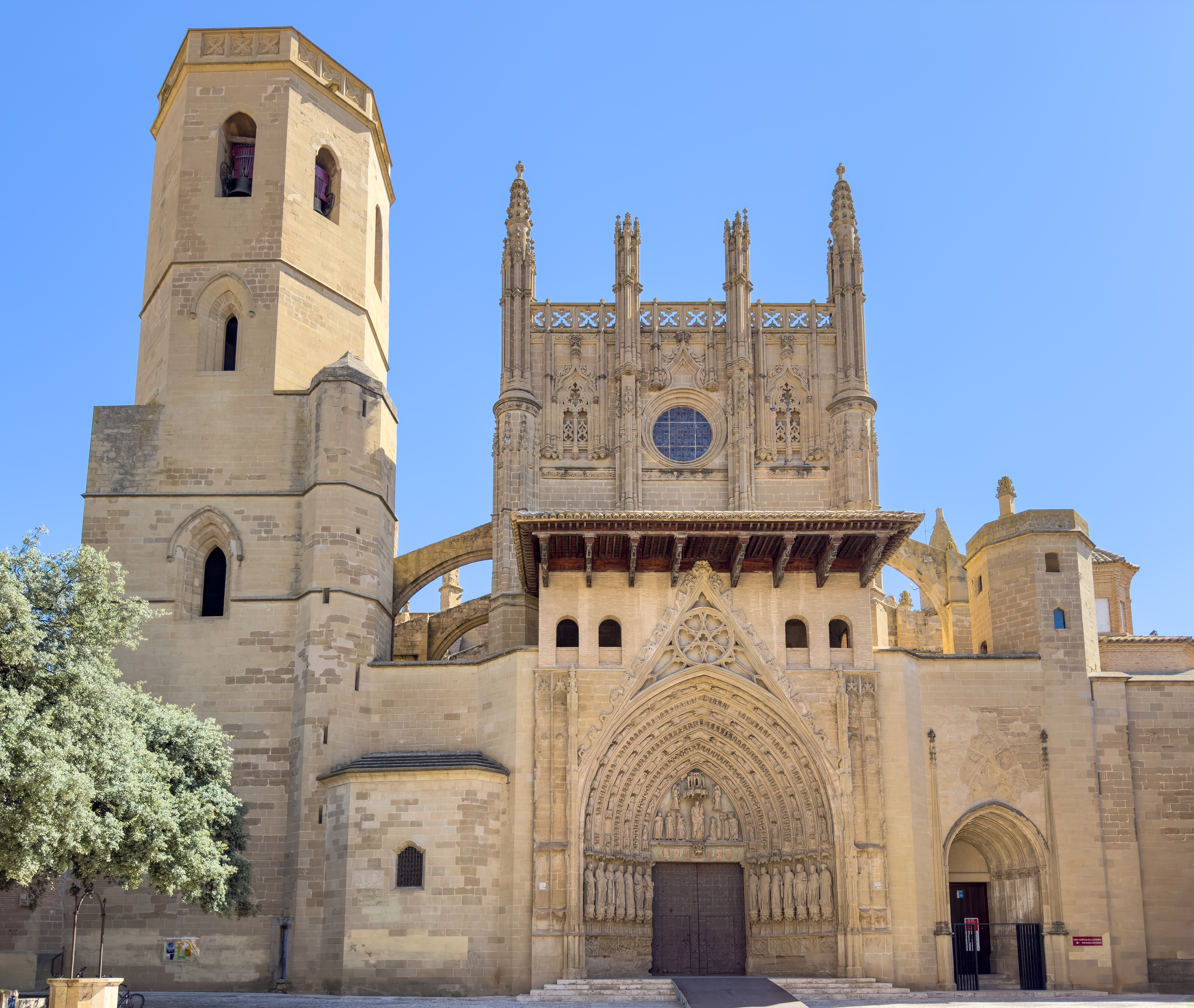

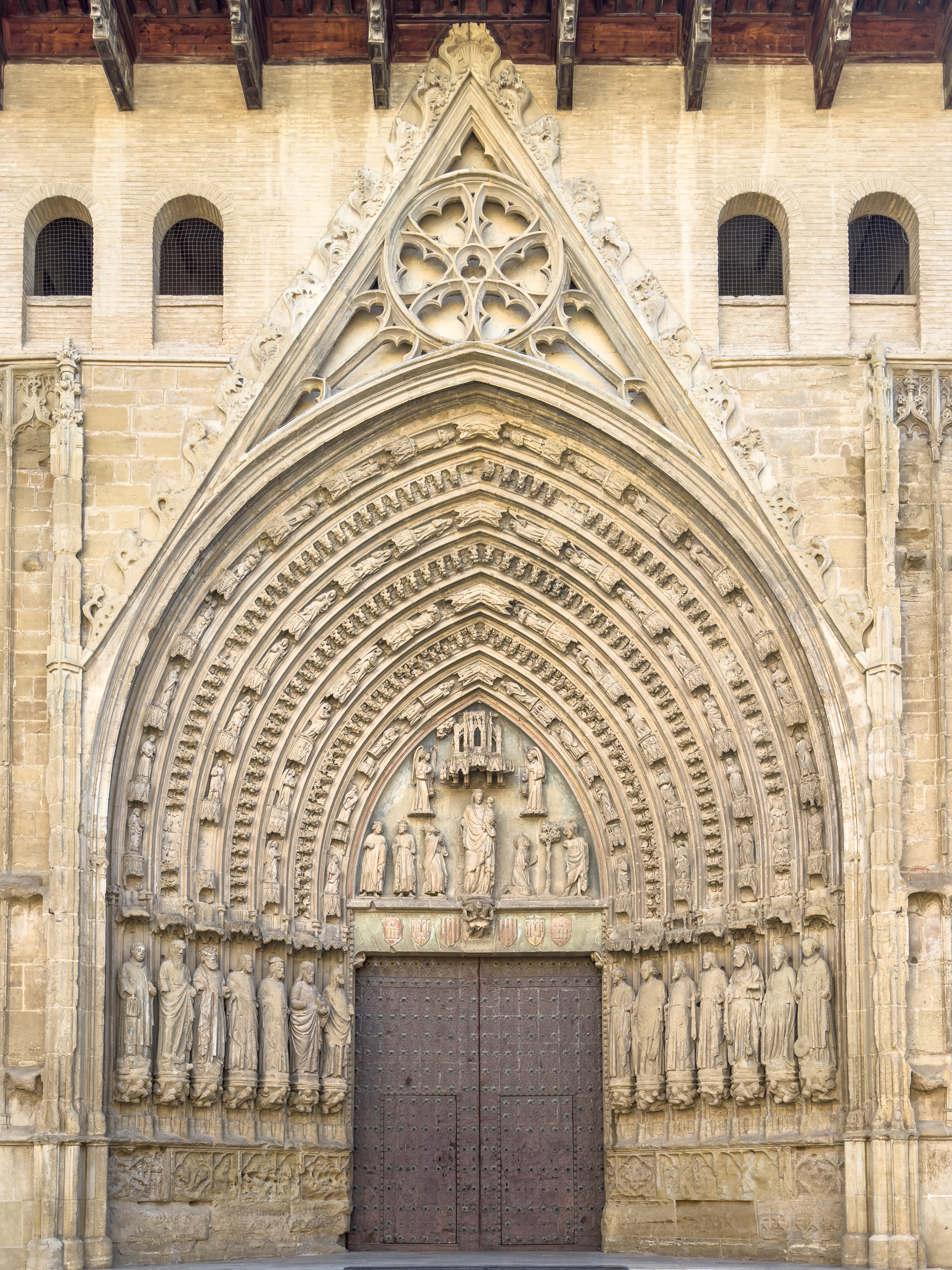
Portada de estilo gótico (1539)

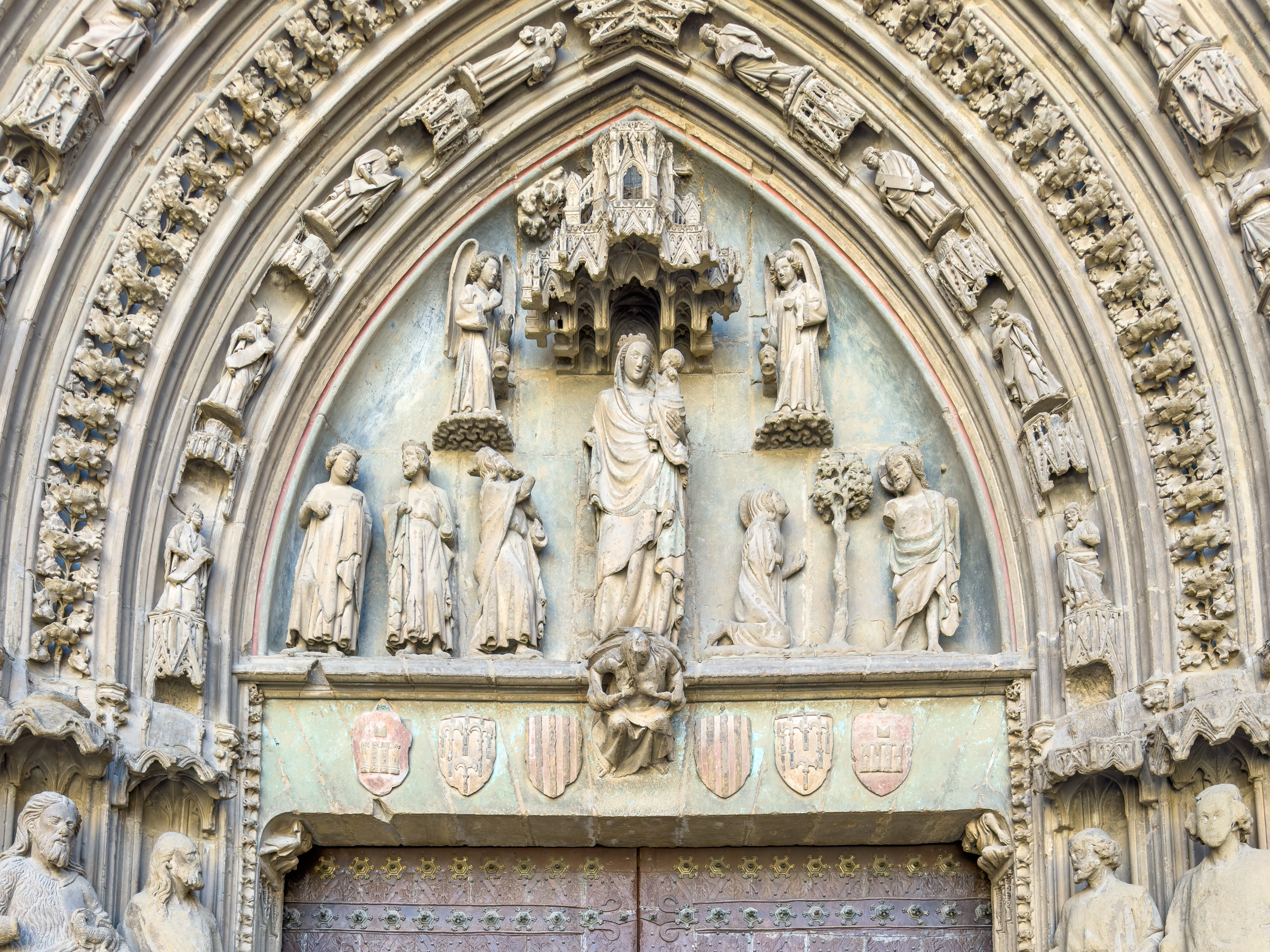
Portada de estilo gótico (1539)

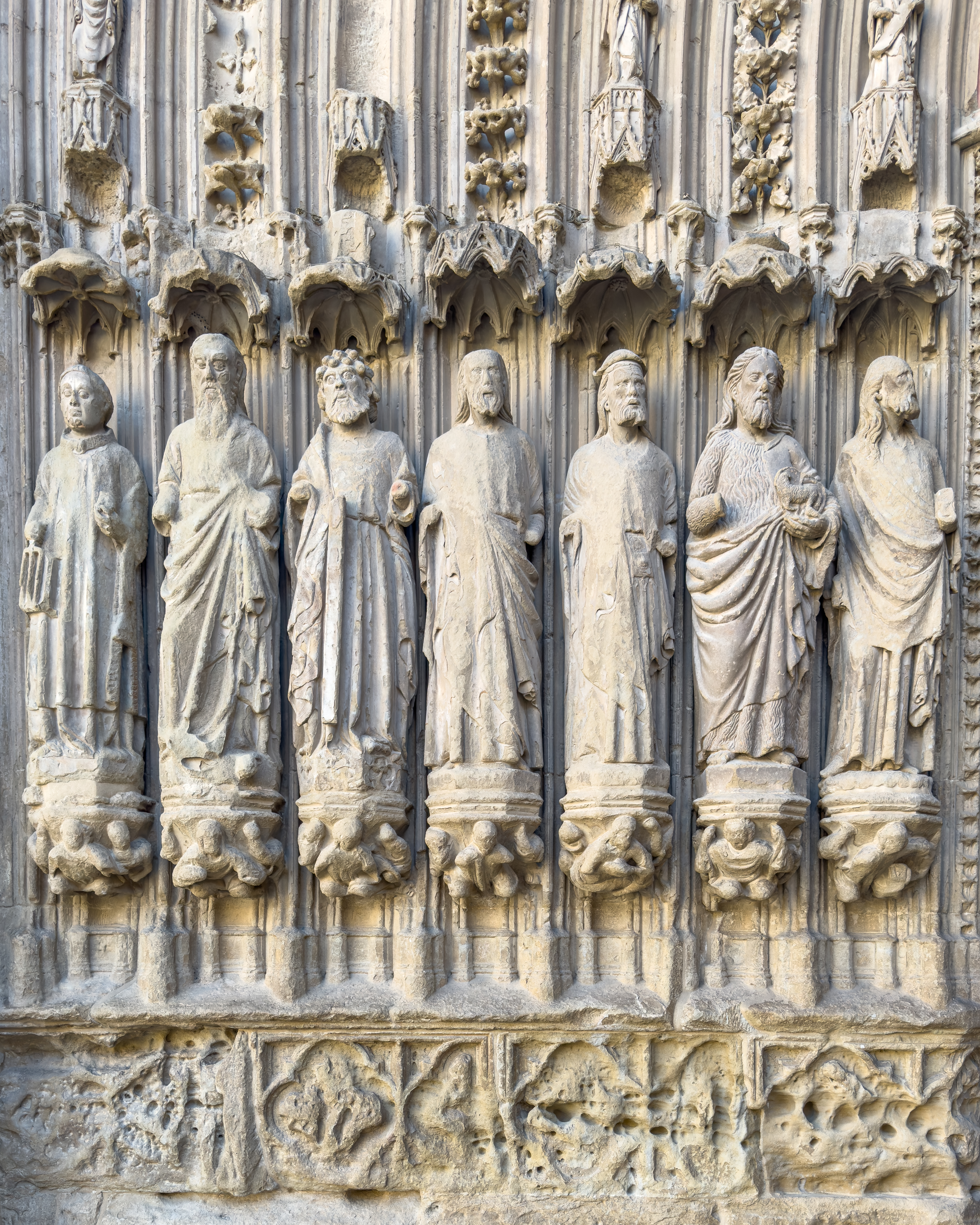
Esculturas de la portada: en primer término aparece san Lorenzo, patrono de la ciudad

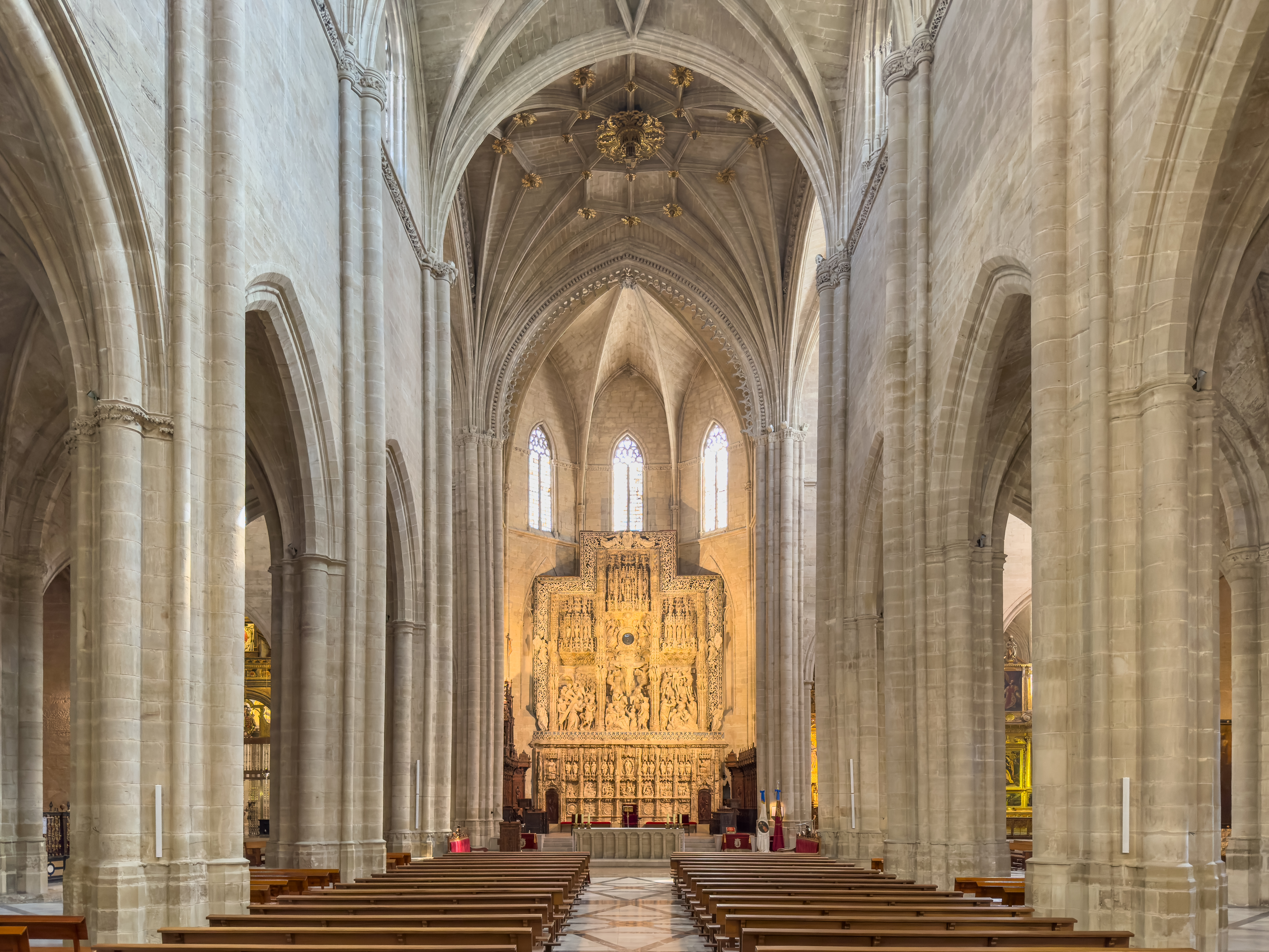

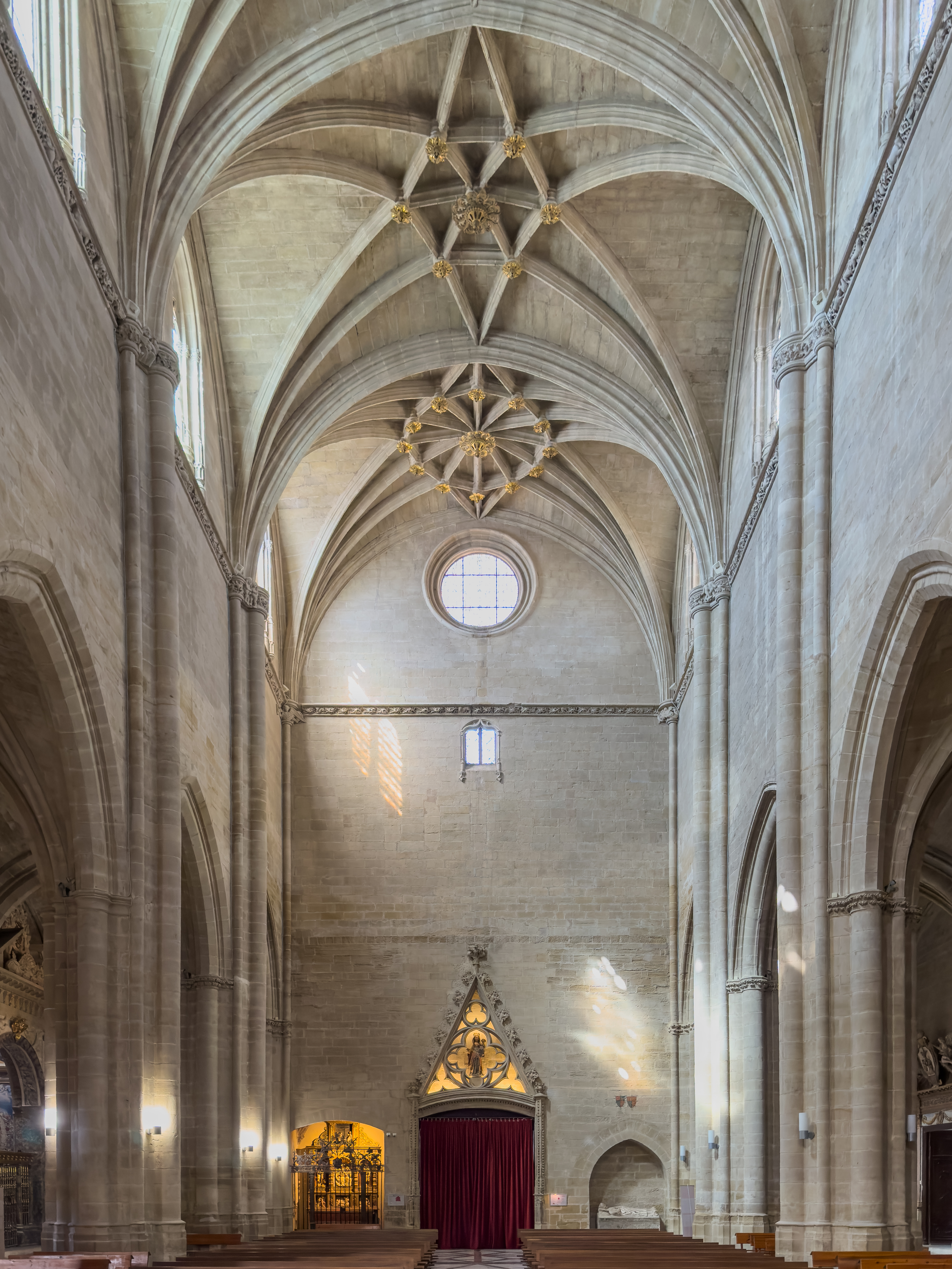

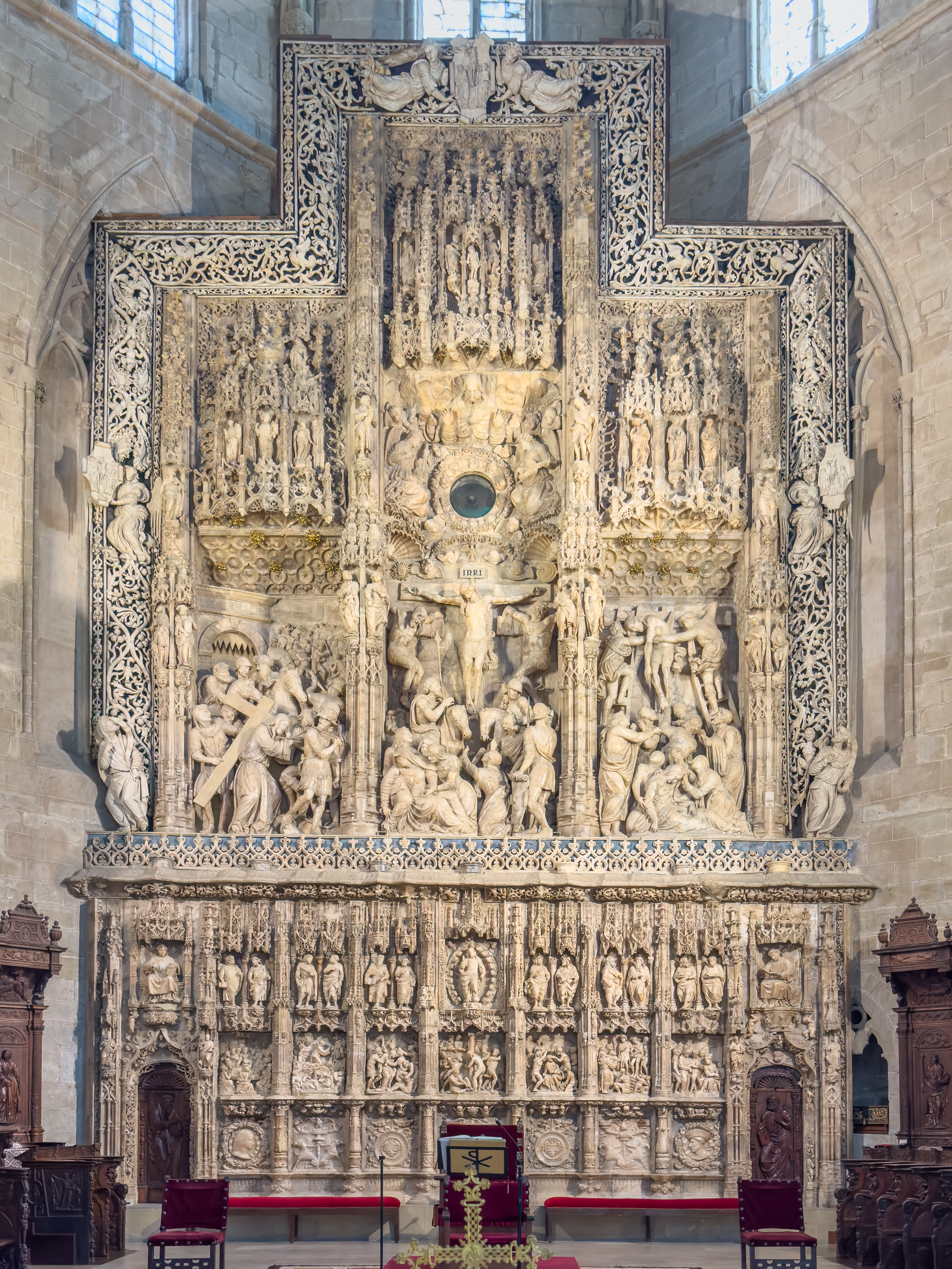
Altar mayor (1520)

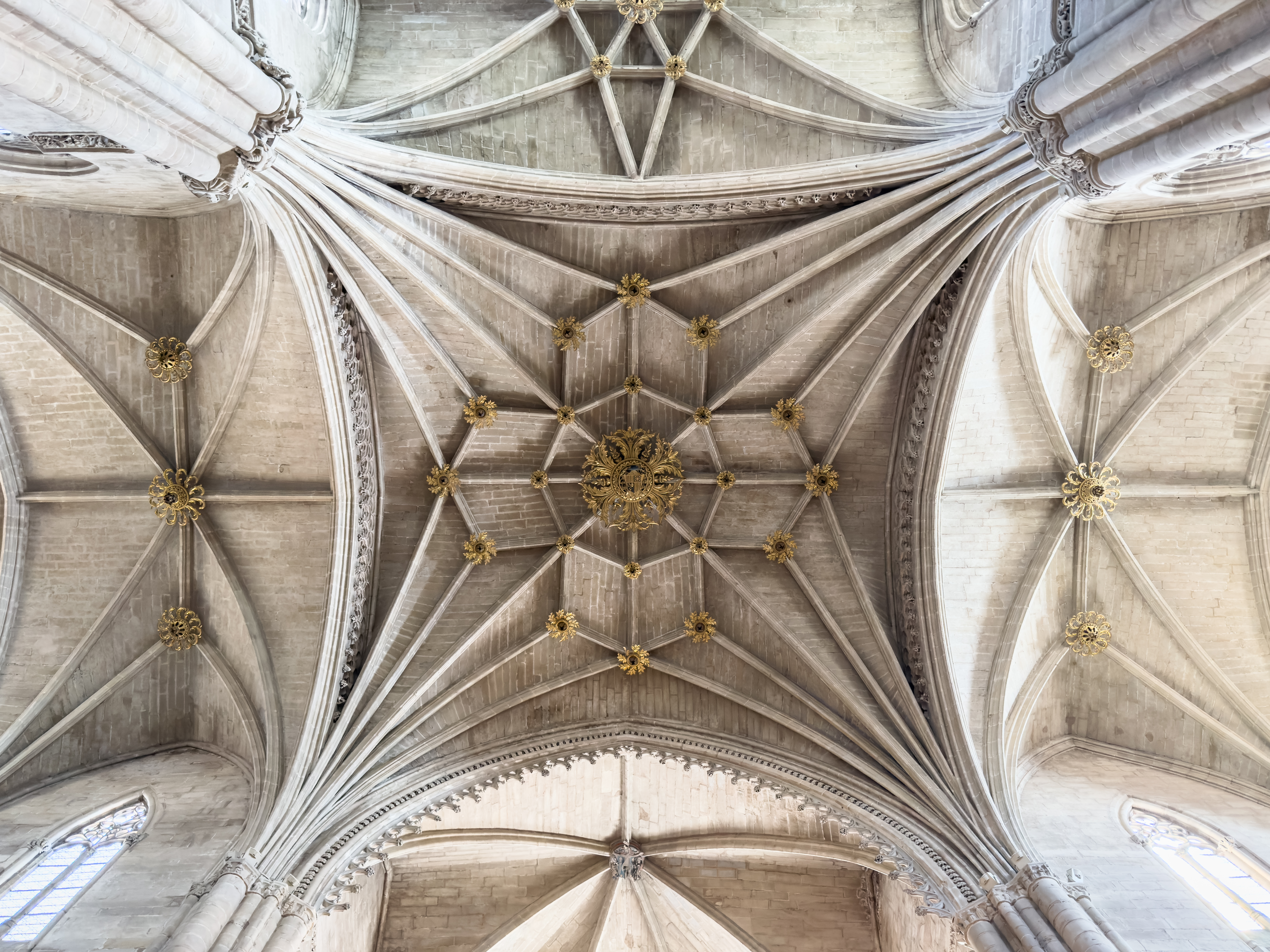

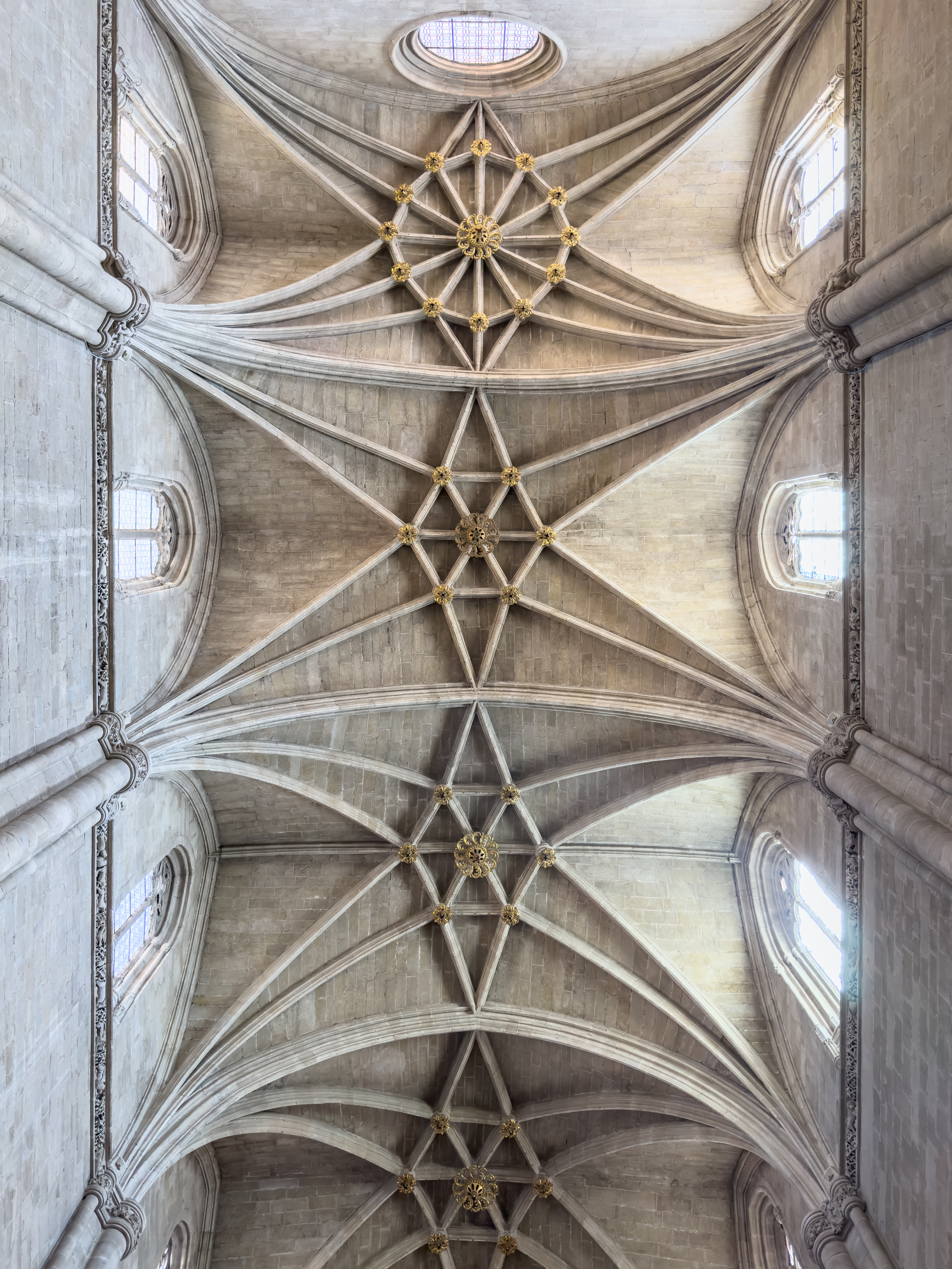

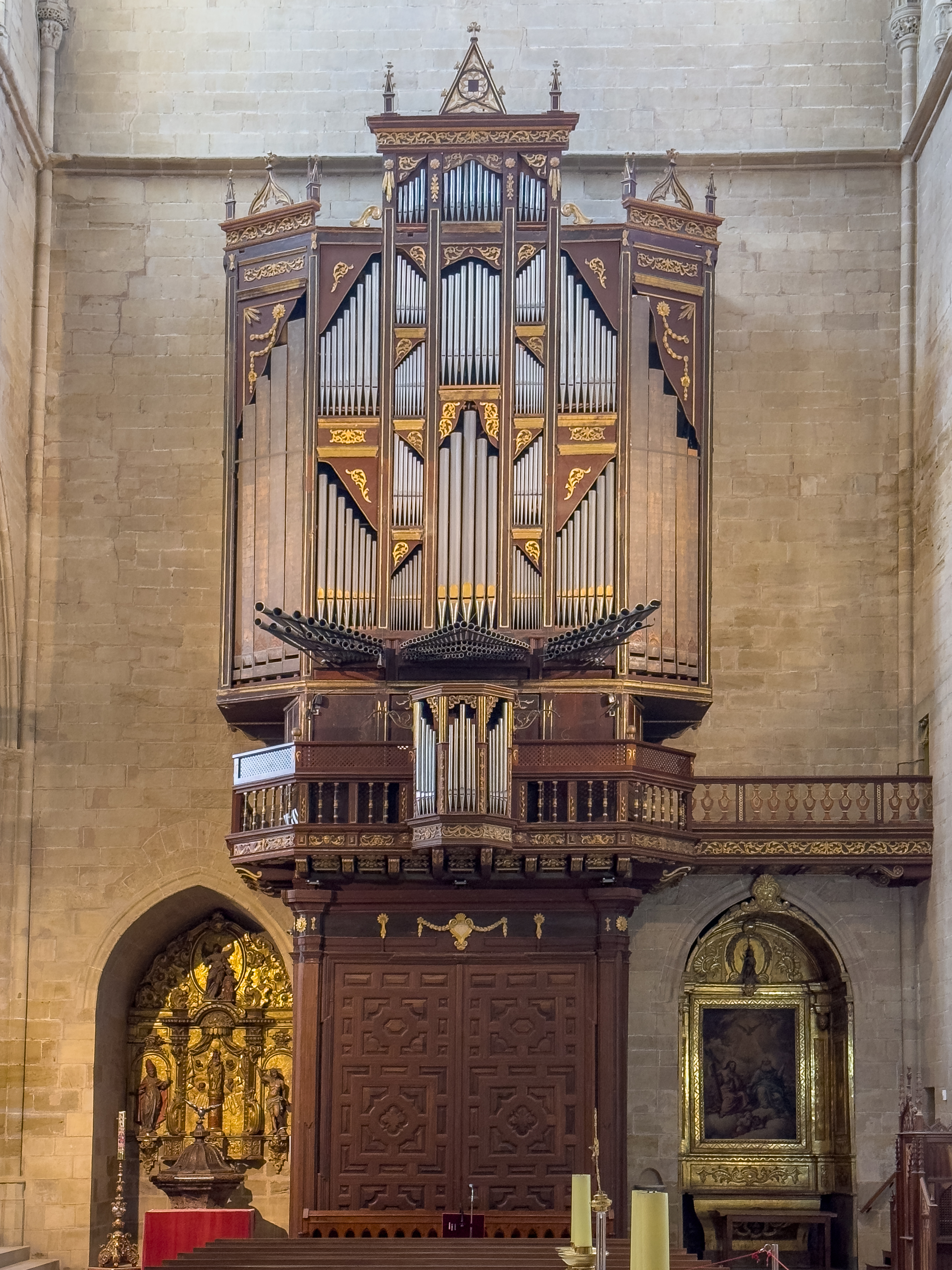

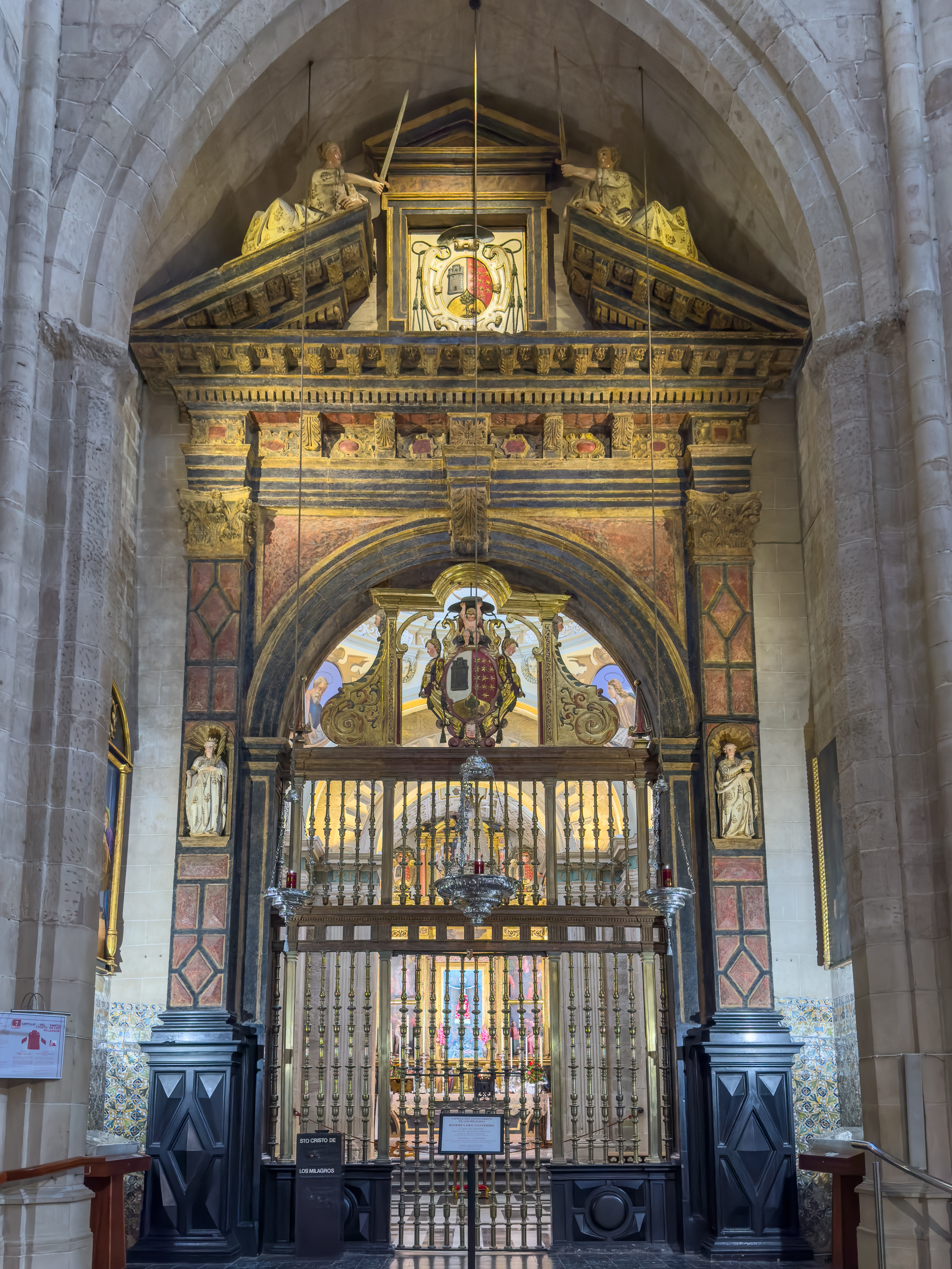
Capilla del Sagrario

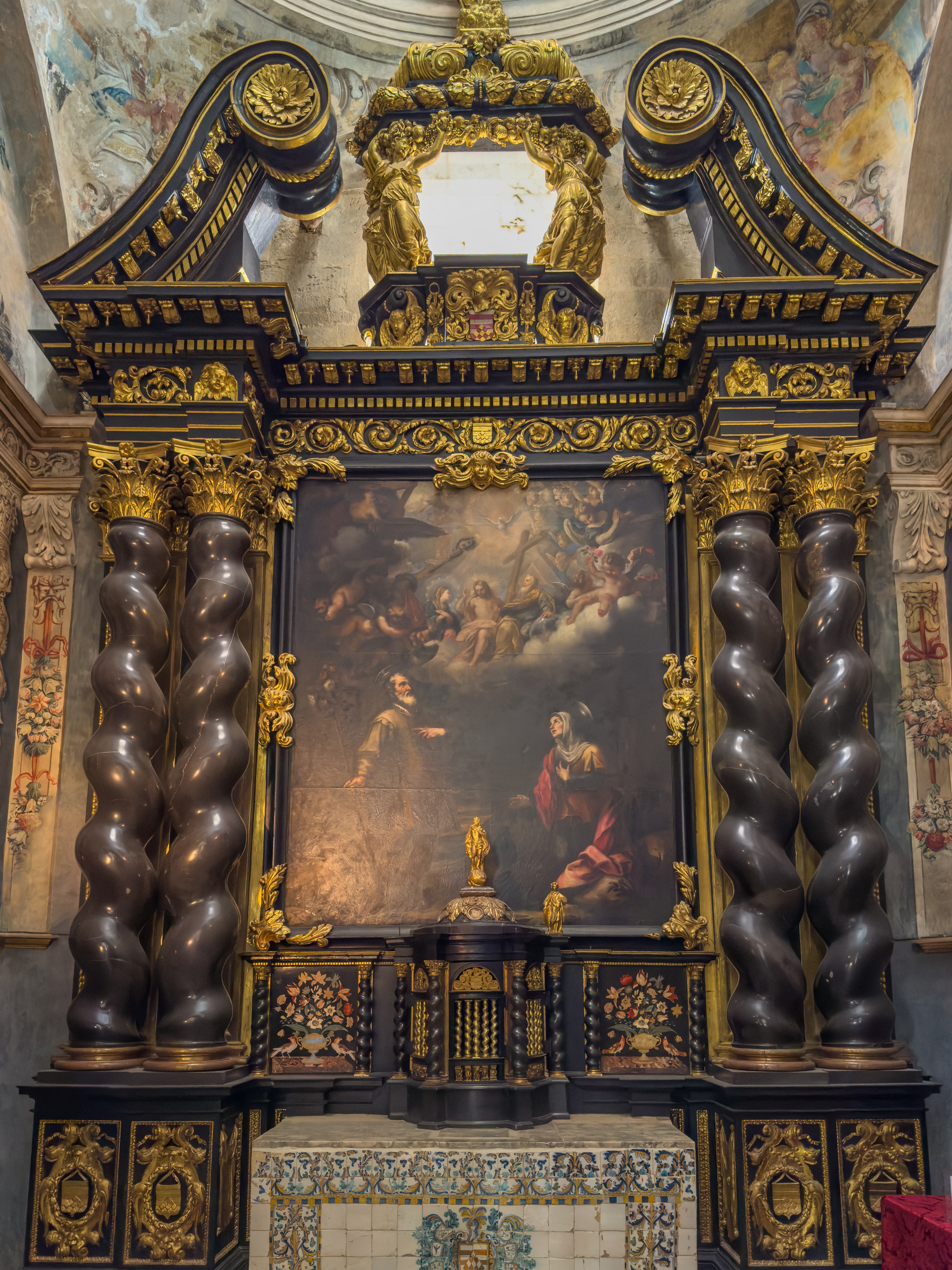
Capilla de San Orencio y Santa Paciencia

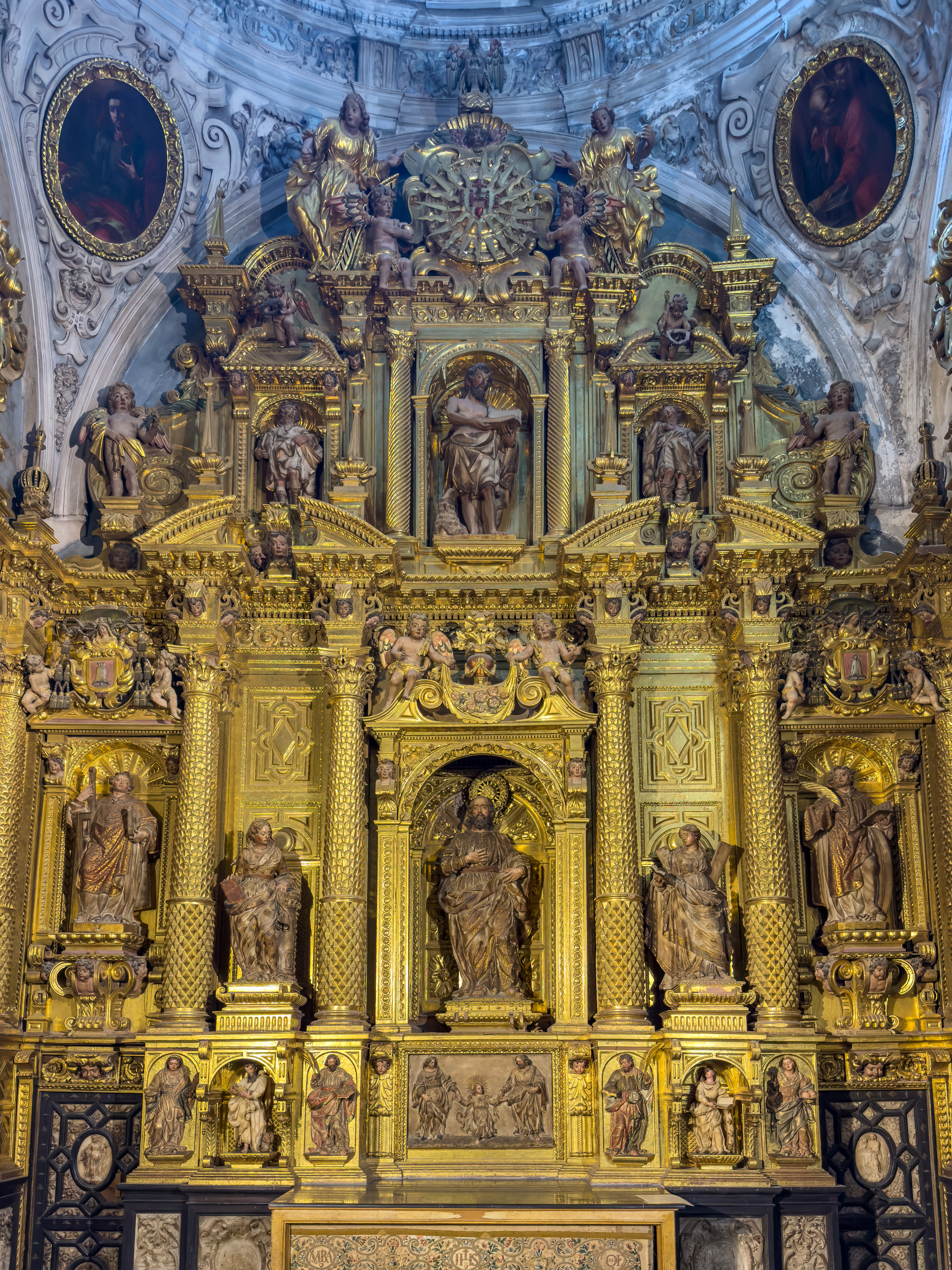
Capilla de San Joaquín

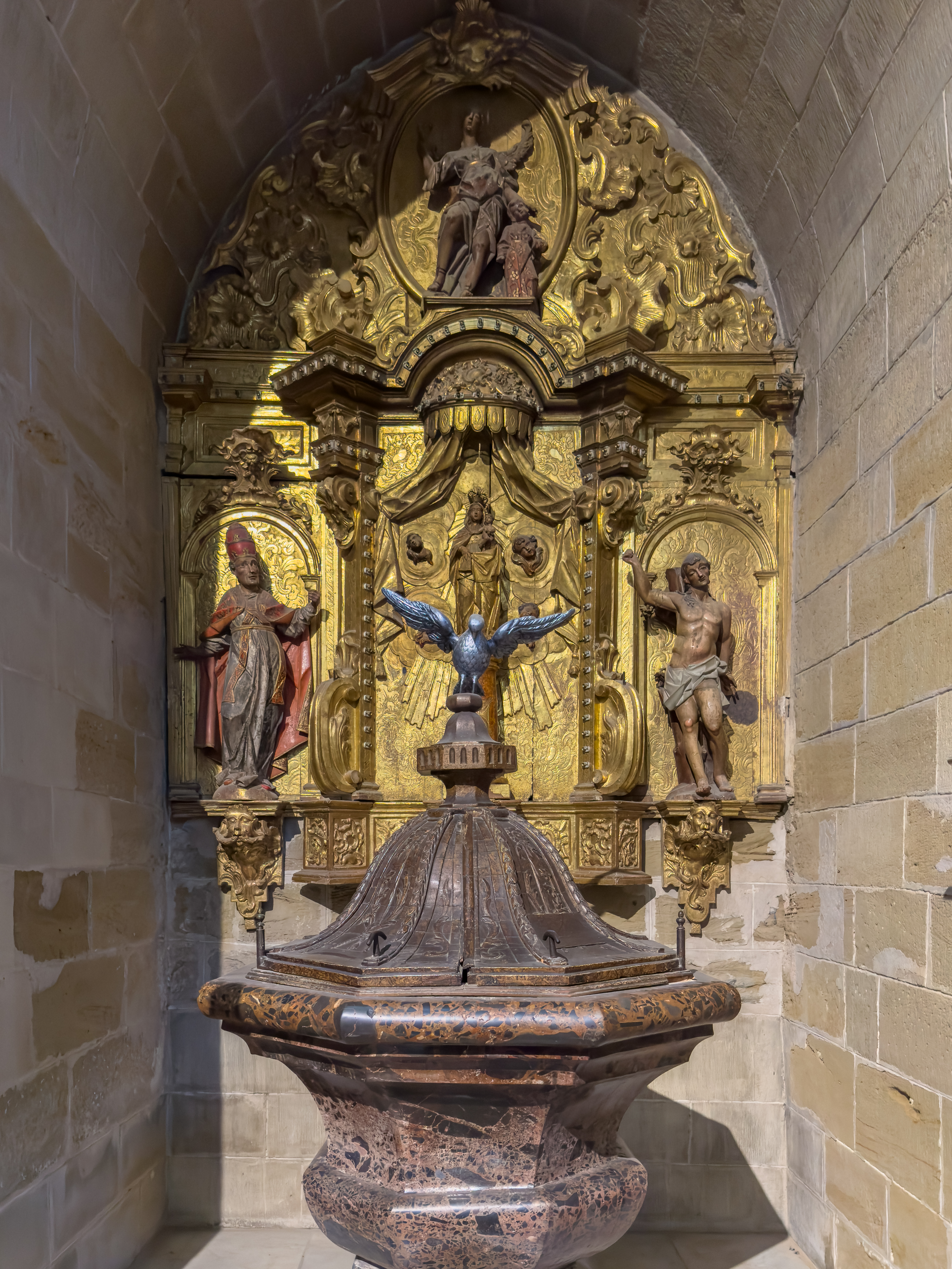
Capilla de la Virgen del Pilar

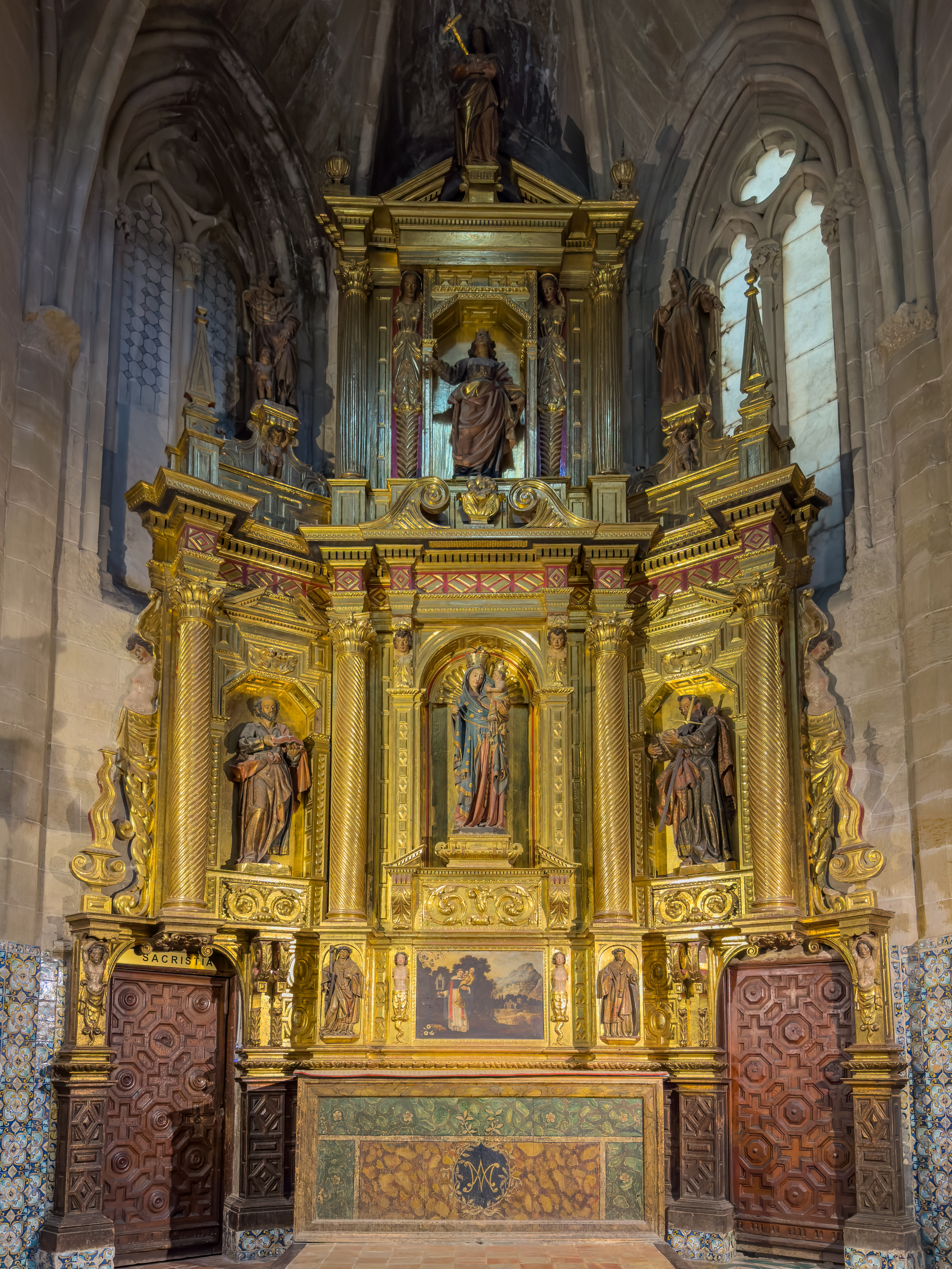
Capilla de la Virgen del Rosario

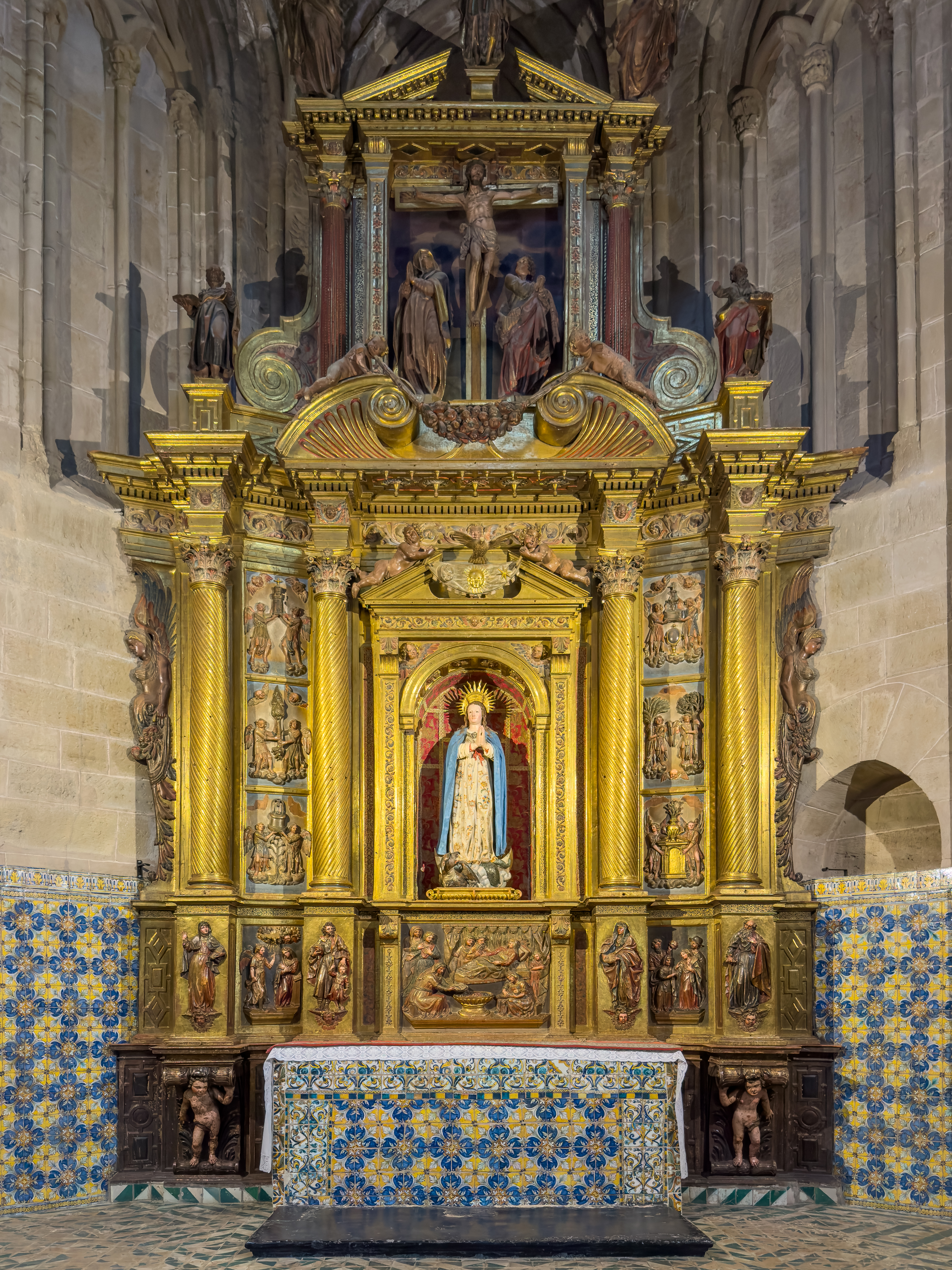
Capilla de la Inmaculada

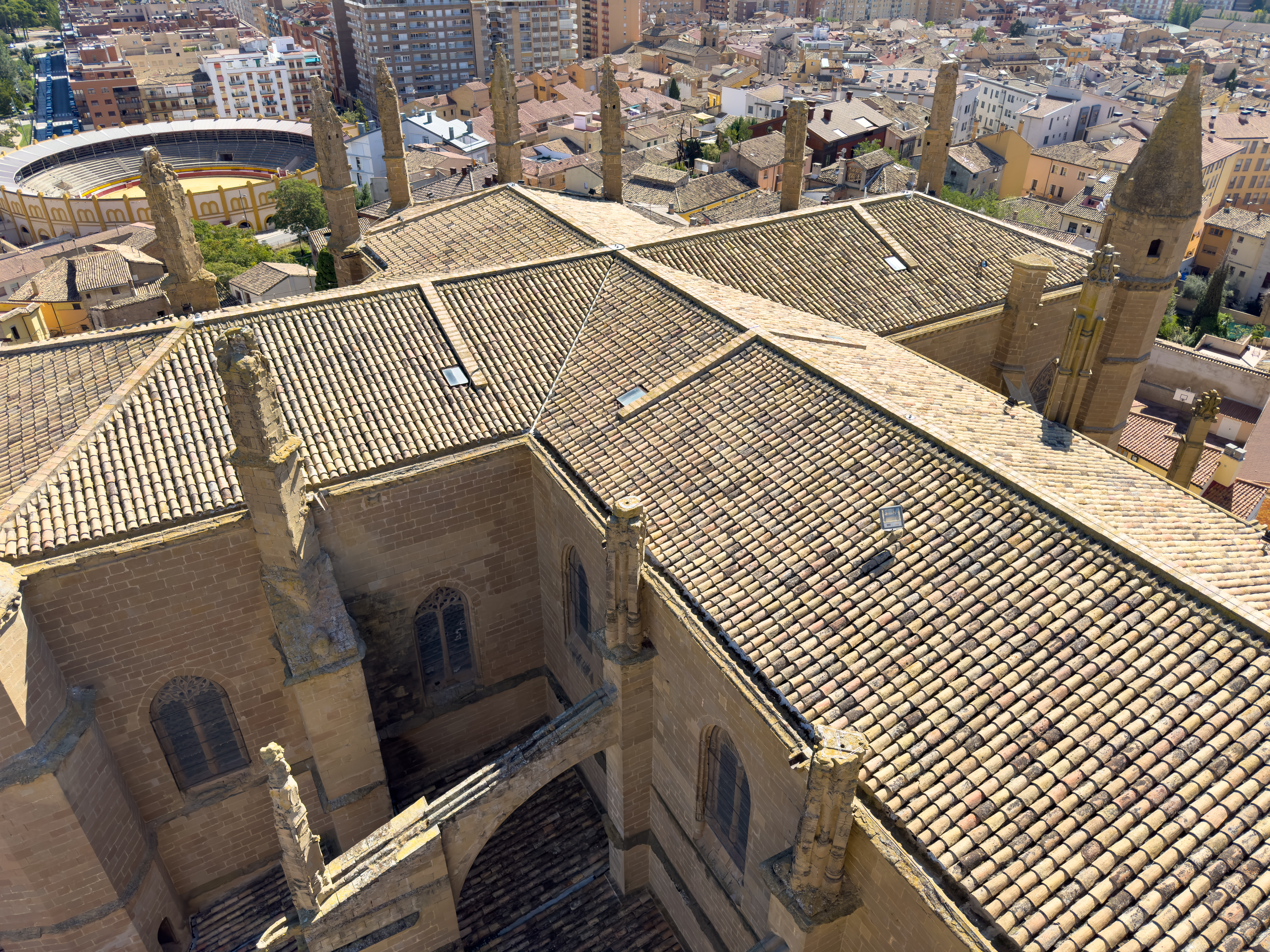
Vista desde el campanario

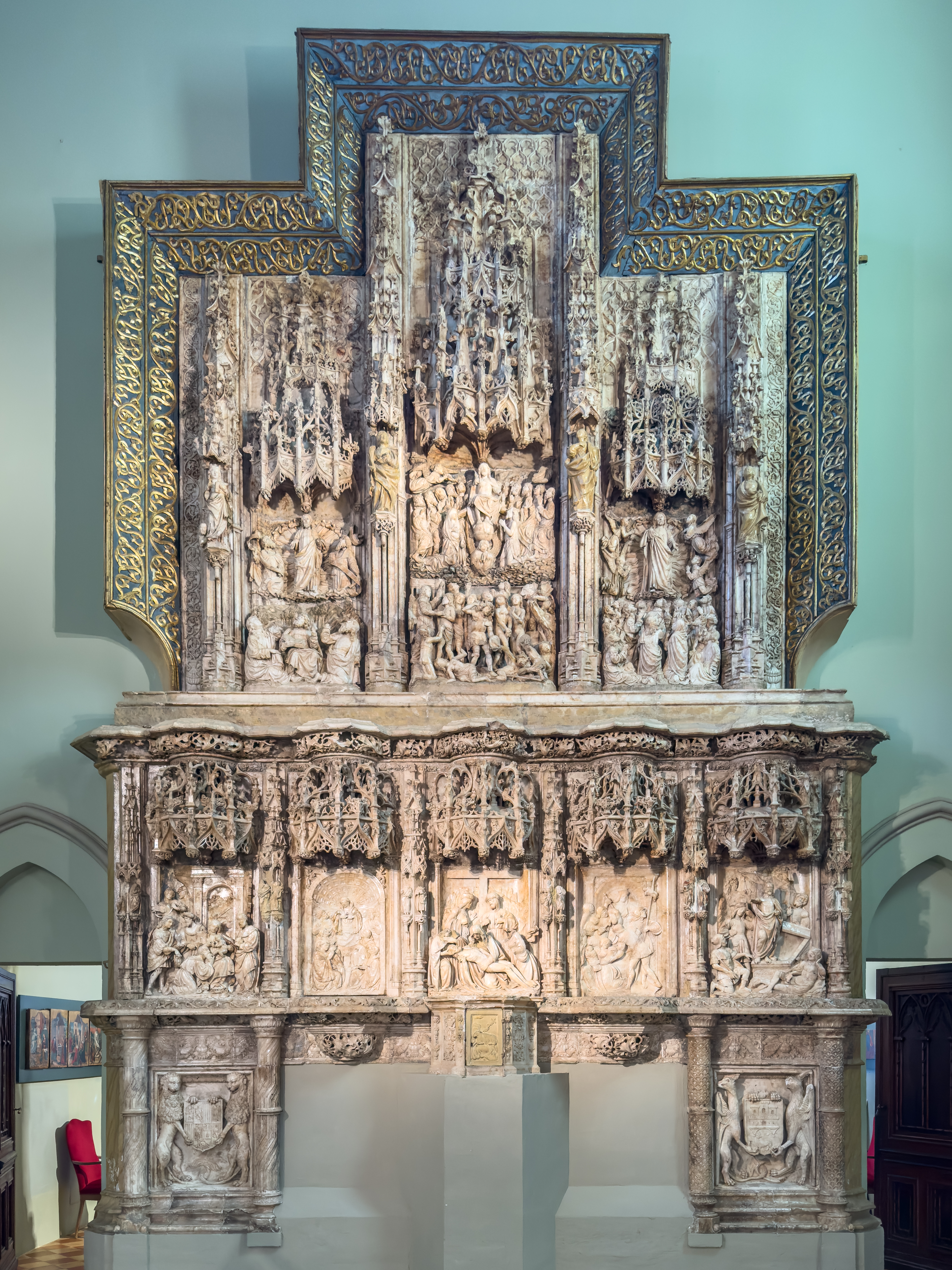
Retablo de Montearagón en Museo Diocesano

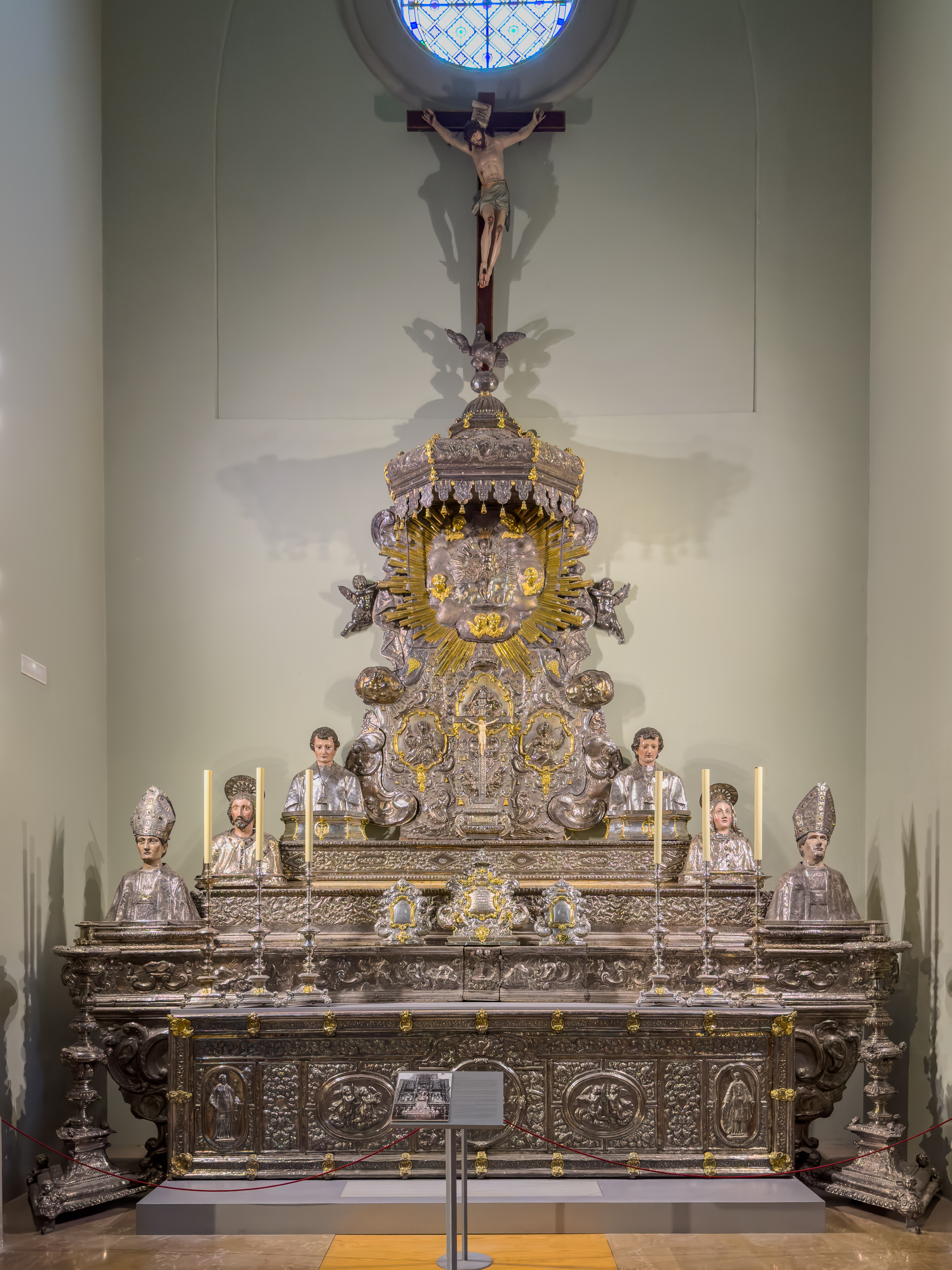
Retablo de plata en Museo Diocesano

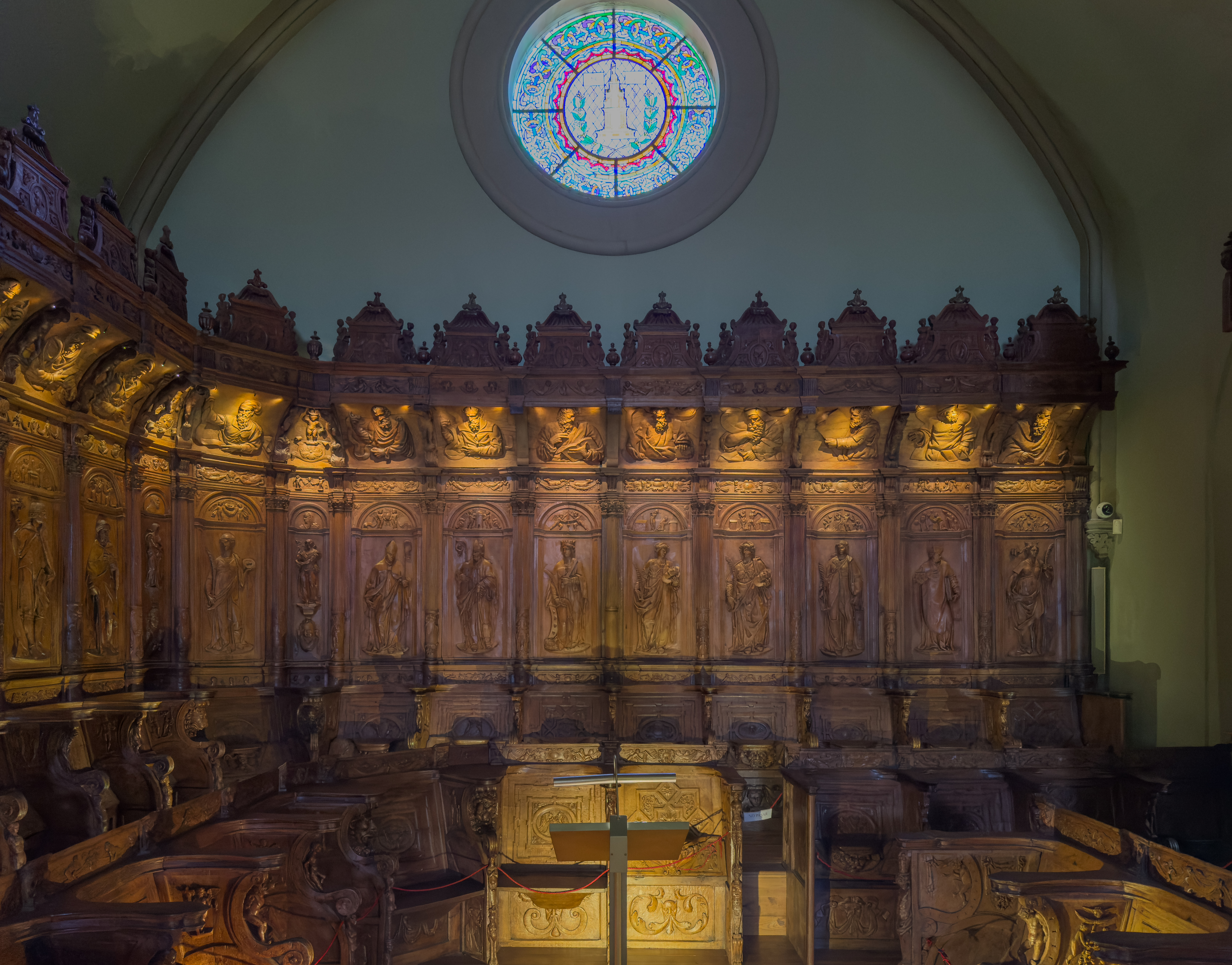
Sillería del coro en Museo Diocesano

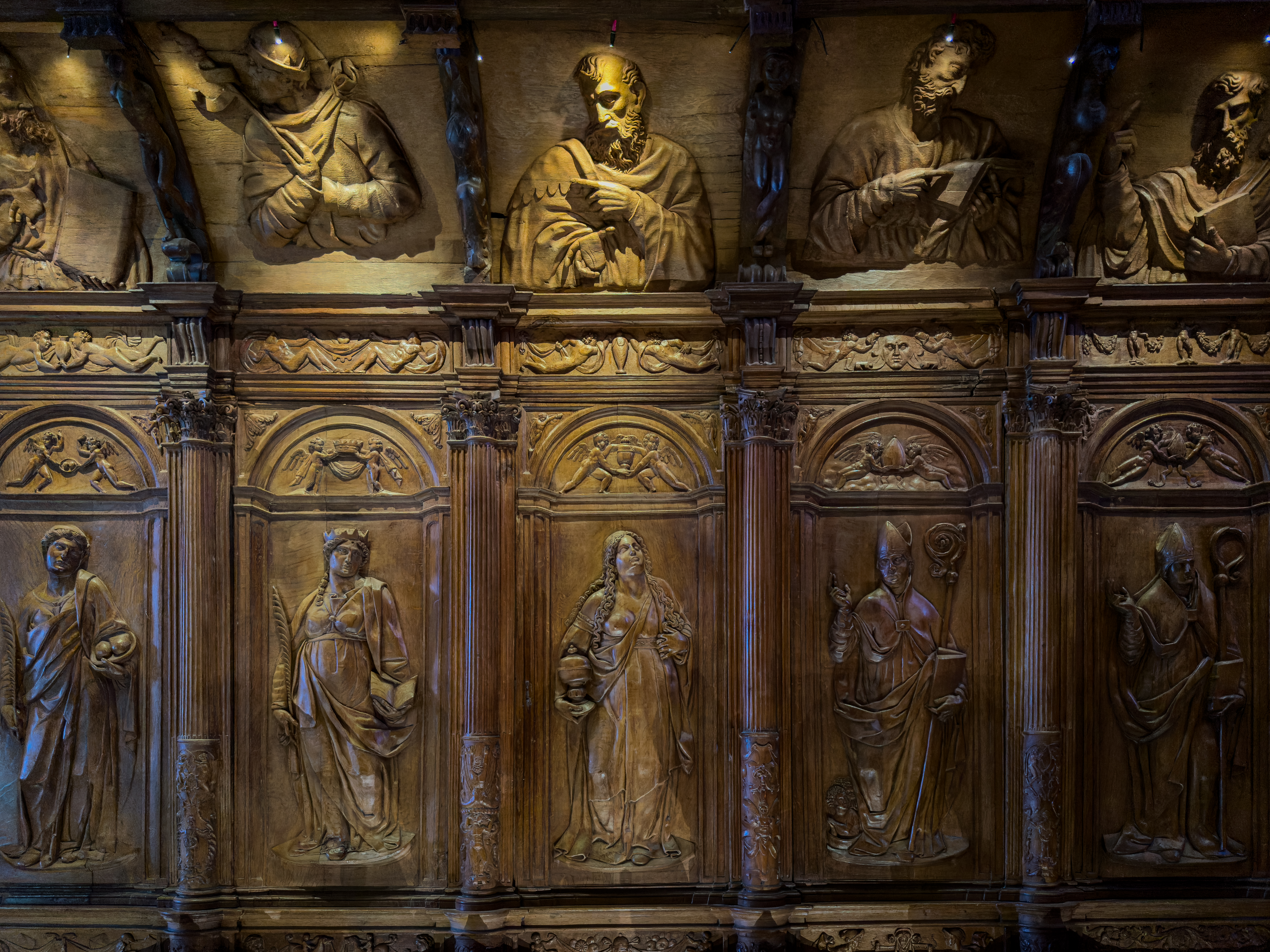
Sillería del coro en Museo Diocesano

== See also ==
- Diocese of Huesca
- Huesca
