= In persona episcopi =

Latin expression

In persona episcopi (English: In the person of the bishop) is a Latin expression used by the Catholic Church to indicate a union of two or more dioceses in which the dioceses are administered by a single bishop but undergo no alteration to their diocesan structures (e.g. seminaries, cathedrals, curia officials). In its simplest form such a union can be temporary, but in other cases it can be an intermediate step towards a union aeque principaliter or a full union.

== Examples ==
- Canada: Moosonee and Hearst
- Great Britain (Wales): Cardiff and Menevia (2022–2024), which later merged
- Ireland: Clonfert and Galway, Kilmacduagh and Kilfenora; Killala and Tuam
- Italy: Pescia and Pistoia
- Spain: Huesca and Jaca, united in the person of Bishop Pedro Aguado Cuesta since 2023.
- United States: Baltimore and Washington (1939–1947)

== See also ==
- Canon law (Catholic Church)
