= Álvaro de Mendoza =

Álvaro de Mendoza may refer to:

- Álvaro Eugenio de Mendoza Caamaño y Sotomayor (1671–1761), Spanish Roman Catholic cardinal
- Álvaro de Mendoza (bishop) (died 1631), Spanish Roman Catholic bishop
- Álvaro de Mendoza (conquistador), conquistador in Colombia; see Rionegro
