= Pedro Aguado Cuesta =

Mgr Pedro Aguado Cuesta Sch. P.
- Bishop of Huesca and Jaca
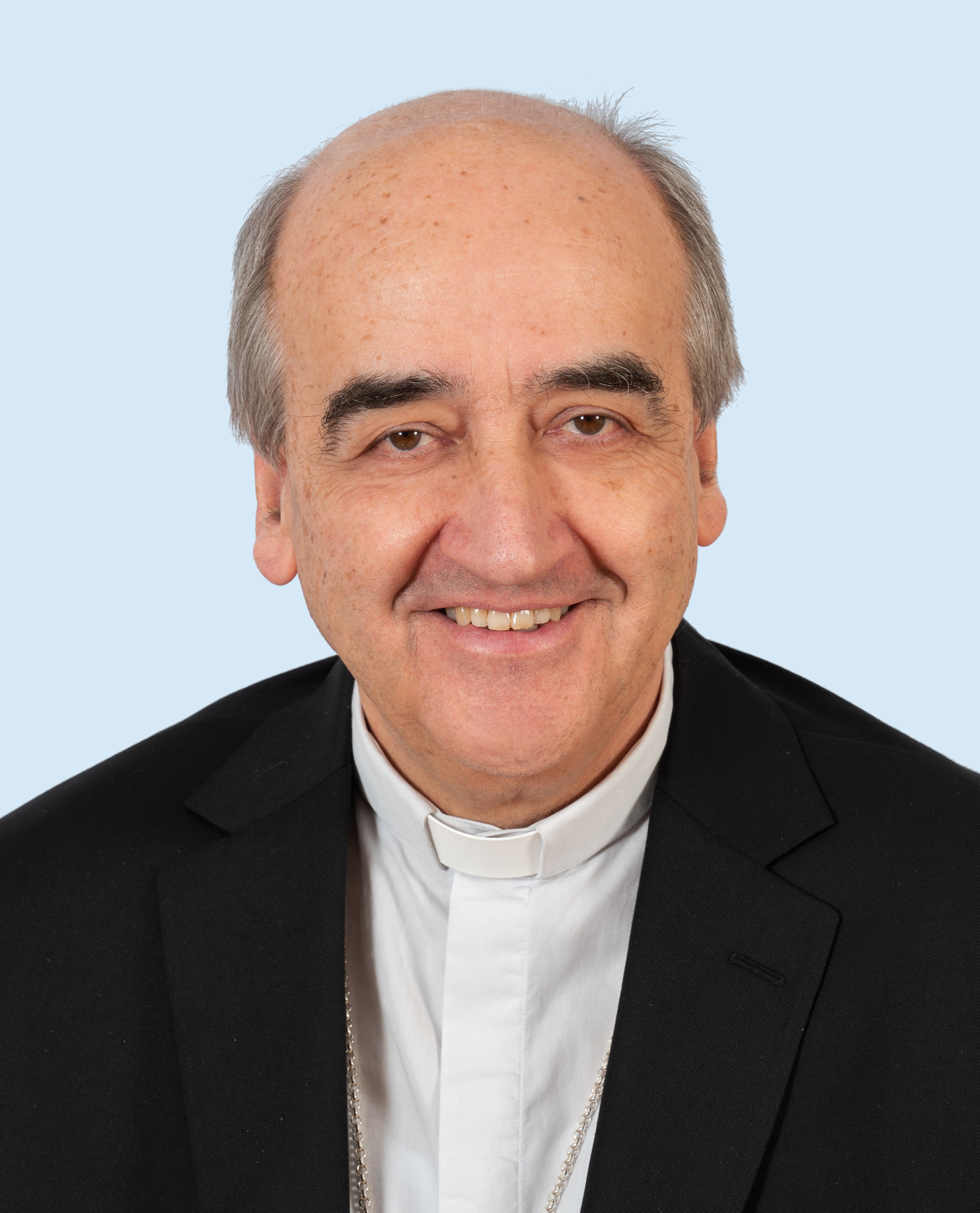
- Church: Roman Catholic
- Archdiocese: Pamplona and Tudela
- Province: Pamplona and Tudela
- Metropolis: Pamplona and Tudela
- Diocese: Huesca and Jaca
- Appointed: 29 March 2025
- Installed: 14 June 2025
- Predecessor: Julián Ruiz Martorell
- Previous post: Superior General of the Piarists (2009-2025)

Orders
- Ordination: 13 June 1982 by José María Cirarda Lachiondo
- Consecration: 14 June 2025 by João Braz de Aviz, Carlos Manuel Escribano Subías, and Vicente Jiménez Zamora
- Rank: Bishop

Personal details
- Born: 26 June 1957 (age 69) Bilbao, Spain
- Education: University of Deusto
- Motto: Scio enim cui credidi
- Coat of arms

Pedro Aguado Cuesta (born 26 June 1957) is a Spanish Roman Catholic prelate and Piarist who has been Bishop of Huesca and Jaca since 2025. He was Superior General of the Piarists from 2009 to 2025.

== Biography ==
Pedro Aguado Cuesta was born in Bilbao on 26 June 1957. He studied at the Piarist school in the city. He studied Teaching at a center in Bilbao (1978) and later earned a degree in Ecclesiastical Sciences from a center affiliated with the University of Navarra (1982). Finally, he obtained a degree in Philosophy and Educational Sciences from the University of Deusto (1988).

He began his novitiate with the Piarists in 1974. He was ordained a priest in 1982 by the then Archbishop of Pamplona, José María Cirarda Lachiondo.

In 1995, he was elected Provincial of the Piarist Province of Vasconia, a position he held for 12 years. In 2007, he became Provincial of the newly formed Emmaus Province. Shortly thereafter, in 2009, he was elected Superior General of the Piarists.

On 29 March 2025, Pope Francis appointed him bishop of the dioceses of Huesca and Jaca, united in persona episcopi since 2003. He took possession as Bishop of Huesca on 14 June 2025 and as Bishop of Jaca on 15 June 2025.
