= Diocesan chancery =

Office of the chancellor of a diocese

A diocesan chancery is the branch of administration that handles all written documents used in the official government of a Catholic, Anglican, or Orthodox diocese.

It is in the diocesan chancery that, under the direction of the bishop or his representative (the local ordinary), all documents which concern the diocese are drawn up, copied, forwarded, and a record kept of all official writings expedited or received.

The official charged with the execution of these duties is known as the diocesan chancellor.

== Latin Catholic dioceses ==
In many dioceses, the chancellor exercises some of the faculties which in other dioceses are exclusively reserved for the vicar-general. This happens more frequently in smaller dioceses, administered directly by the bishop himself, and in which the vicar-general (often not resident in the episcopal city) is called on only when the bishop is absent or hindered.

In such cases, the chancellor is also the confidential secretary of the bishop. A similar system obtains even in many extensive dioceses, which the bishop administers with the aid of one or more vicars-general and the diocesan chancery. There are. However, he executes some large dioceses in which all matters are personally reserved to the bishop with the aid of a secretary or chancellor, usually a priest or deacon. At the same time, the greater part of the diocesan administration is handed over to a body of officials under the bishop's or vicar-general's direction.

For the correspondence, registration, and care of the archives, such administrative bureaus are provided with a secretariat or chancery. The chancery is a necessary element of administration in every diocese. Some provision for its duties must be made, even in missionary dioceses, apostolic prefectures, and apostolic vicariates. Unless the official correspondence were properly cared for, there would be no tradition in diocesan management, important documents would be lost, and the written evidence necessary in lawsuits and trials would be lacking.

The famous Apostolic Chancery (Cancellaria Apostolica) developed in time from the chancery of the primitive Bishop of Rome. Because of the latter's primacy in the Church, his chancery naturally had far wider relations than any other Christian diocese. The Apostolic See had never legislated concerning diocesan chanceries until the 1983 Code of Canon Law under its canons on the diocesan curia (cc. 469-494). The diocesan system was generally introduced in many countries whose churches had hitherto been under a more or less provisional government (e.g., United States, England, Scotland, and India).

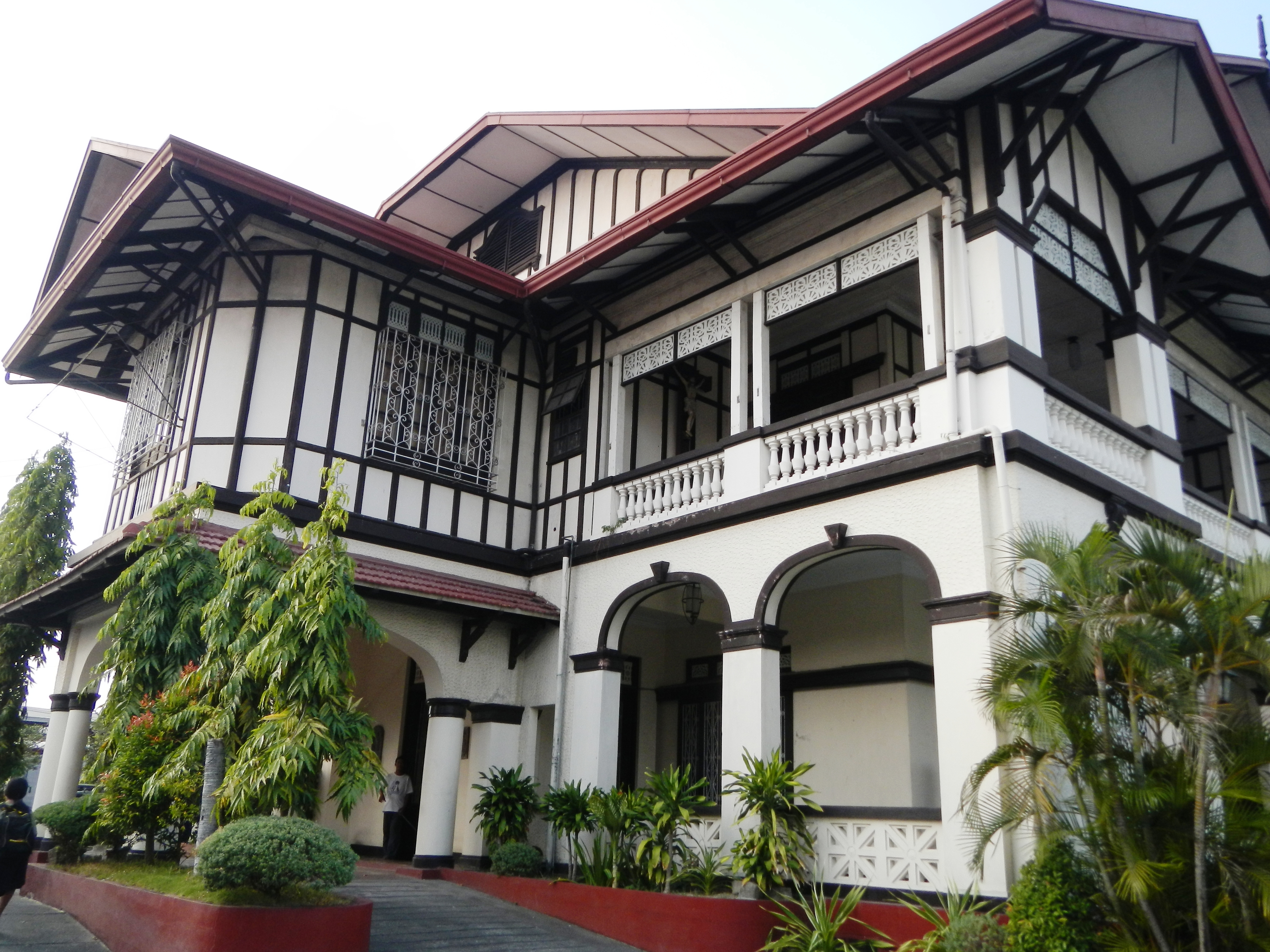
Archdiocesan Chancery in San Fernando, Pampanga, Philippines

National and provincial synods laid much stress on creating diocesan chanceries. In the United States, the First Plenary Council of Baltimore (1852) expressed the wish that in every diocese, there should be a chancery, to facilitate ecclesiastical administration and establish for its conduct a more or less identical system. In Ireland, the National Synod of Thurles (1850) made provision for the establishment and preservation of diocesan archives. Similarly, for England, the Provincial Synod of Westminster (1852).

In keeping with these recommendations, the diocesan chancery consists of a certain number of officials named by the bishop. In the United States, England, and Australia, there are usually, besides the vicar-general, a diocesan chancellor and a secretary. In European dioceses, the chancery is organized variously according to the extent of the diocese. There is generally in each diocese a chancellor or secretary with the necessary personnel.

In the dioceses of Germany, much of the administration is carried on by an official bureau (Ordinariat) as described above, i.e., the vicariate-general, to which are adjoined a secretariat, a registry office, and a chancery.

In the Diocese of Breslau, there existed an institution known as the "Secret Chancery" (Geheimkanzlei), which expedited only matters decided by the prince-bishop personally or with the advice of this body. The prince-bishop presided over its sessions with the help of the vicar-general. Its members were three priests and one lay counselor, to whom were added a secretary, a chief of the chancery, two private secretaries, a registrar, etc. The ordinary diocesan administration was carried on by two other bureaus, the vicariate-general and the diocesan consistory, mutually independent, but both acting in the name of the prince-bishop.

For the office of diocesan chancellor in the United States, see "Acta et Decreta" of the Third Plenary Council of Baltimore, in index, p. 303, and of the Synod of Maynooth (1900), s. v. "Archiva".

== Anglican dioceses ==
Diocesan chanceries may be universal, but there is nothing concerning their creation and equipment in the common ecclesiastical law. The explanation lies in the very nature of this law, which provides only for what is general and common. It takes no account of local means of administration, which it abandons to the proper authority in each diocese, the concrete circumstances always offering great variety and calling for all possible freedom of action.

Although, as described above, the methods of diocesan administration exhibit little variety, there is a certain uniformity. Each diocese, after all, is bound to observe the common law, has an identical range of freedom, and identical limits to its authority. Each diocese, therefore, is likely, a priori, to develop its administration along similar lines but does so regularly in harmony with others, particularly neighboring dioceses. In this way, the dioceses of a given country come to have similar official administrations.

== Eastern Orthodoxy ==
In Eastern Orthodoxy, chanceries serve as the administration and spiritual center and residence of the ruling archbishop, primate, or metropolitan, and is usually headed by the ruling hierarch. The chancery may also serve as the hosting or meeting location of a synod.

== See also ==
- Chancellor (ecclesiastical)
- Moderator of the Curia
