= José Palafox Palafox =

Spanish Roman Catholic Bishop

Most Reverend José Palafox Palafox
- Bishop of Jaca
- Church: Catholic Church
- Diocese: Diocese of Jaca
- In office: 1627–1628
- Predecessor: Juan Estelrich
- Successor: Álvaro de Mendoza (bishop)

Personal details
- Died: 28 December 1628 Jaca, Spain

José Palafox Palafox (died 28 December 1628) was a Catholic prelate who served as Bishop of Jaca (1627–1628).

== Biography ==
On 22 March 1627, during the papacy of Pope Urban VIII, José Palafox Palafox was appointed as Bishop of Jaca. He served as Bishop of Jaca until his death on 28 December 1628.

Catholic Church titles
Preceded by Juan Estelrich	Bishop of Jaca; 1627–1628	Succeeded by Álvaro de Mendoza (bishop)
