= Aeque principaliter =

Roman Catholic Church Latin phrase

Aeque principaliter ("equally important") is a Latin term used by the Roman Catholic Church to indicate a merger of two or more dioceses in which – to avoid questions of predominance – the dioceses are all given equal importance. Such a merger often followed a merger in persona episcopi.

This type of union essentially consists into the fusion of two or more circumscriptions into only one. As a consequence, this new diocese will have two or more episcopal sees and cathedrals, which correspond to those of the previous dioceses.

To give an example, the Roman Catholic Archdiocese of Pamplona and Tudela is a single diocese established by the union aeque principaliter of the Archdiocese of Pamplona and the Diocese of Tudela. Through this fusion, the new circumscription has two episcopal sees: Pamplona and Tudela. As a consequence it has also two (co-)cathedrals, one for each episcopal see.

Parishes may also be merged aeque principaliter.

== Examples ==
- Diocese of Atri merged aeque principaliter with the Diocese of Penne (from 15 March 1252 to 1 July 1949)
- Diocese of Prato united aeque principaliter with Diocese of Pistoia (from 22 September 1653 to 25 January 1954)
- Diocese of Bitonto united aeque principaliter to Diocese of Ruvo (from 27 June 1818 to 30 September 1982)
- Diocese of Brugnato united aeque principaliter with Diocese of Luni-Sarzana (from 2 October 1820 to 30 September 1986)
- Diocese of Cervia united aeque principaliter with the Archdiocese of Ravenna (from 22 February 1947 to 30 September 1986)

== See also ==
- Canon law (Catholic Church)
