= Rosendo Álvarez Gastón =

Spanish Catholic bishop

- Bishop of Almería
- Church: Catholic Church
- Diocese: Diocese of Almería
- In office: 12 May 1989 – 15 April 2002
- Predecessor: Manuel Casares Hervás
- Successor: Adolfo González Montes
- Previous post: Bishop of Jaca (1984-1989)

Orders
- Ordination: 22 July 1951
- Consecration: 12 January 1985 by Antonio Innocenti

Personal details
- Born: 10 August 1926 Mues, Navarre, Kingdom of Spain
- Died: 3 February 2014 (aged 87)
- Coat of arms

Rosendo Álvarez Gastón (10 August 1926 – 3 February 2014) was a Spanish Catholic bishop.

Ordained to the priesthood in 1951, he was appointed bishop of the Diocese of Jaca, Spain, in 1985. In 1989, he became bishop of the Diocese of Almeria retiring in 2002.
