= Black Abbey =

- Church and Priory of the Most Blessed Trinity, Black Abbey, Kilkenny
- An Mhainistir Dhubh
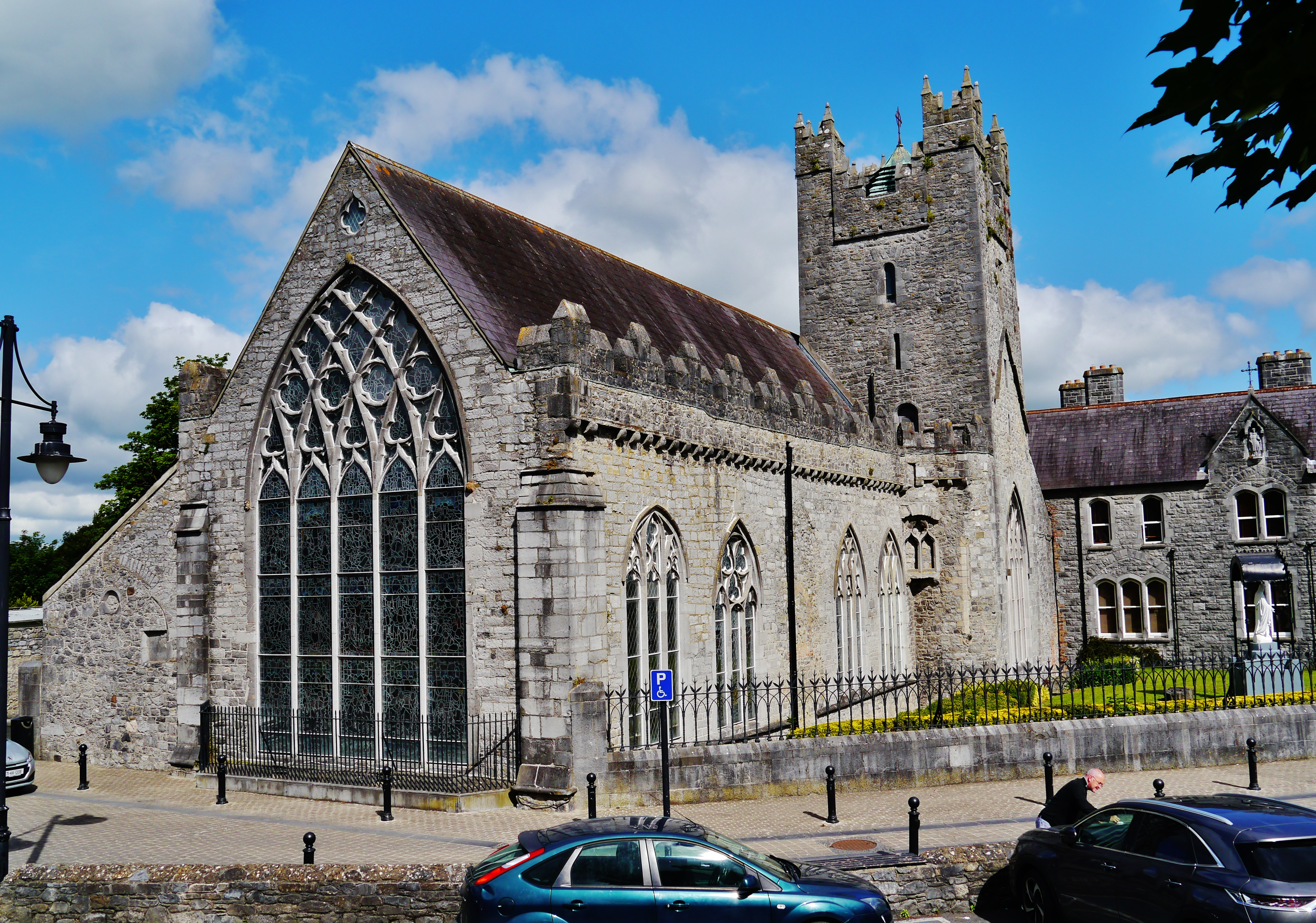
- Black Abbey, Kilkenny in 2022

- Location within Ireland
- 52°39′15″N 7°15′28″W
- Location: Abbey Street, Kilkenny, County Kilkenny
- Country: Ireland
- Denomination: Roman Catholic
- Religious institute: Dominicans
- Website: dominicans.ie

History
- Status: Active
- Founded: 1225
- Founder: William Marshal, 2nd Earl of Pembroke

Architecture
- Style: Norman, Gothic

Administration
- Diocese: Roman Catholic Diocese of Ossory

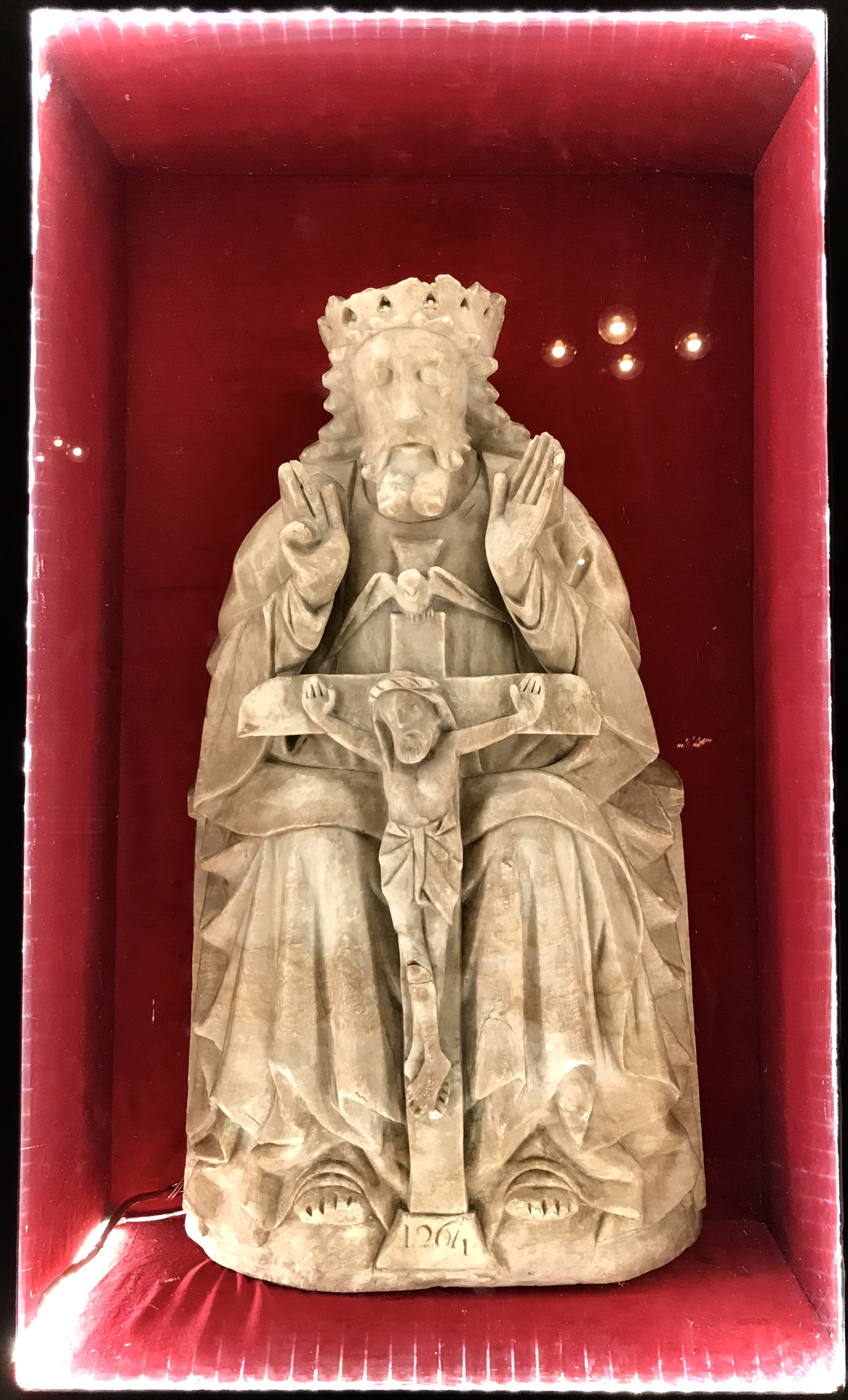
Trinity sculpture

The Black Abbey of Kilkenny, (an Mhainistir Dhubh in Irish), Ireland, is a Catholic priory of the Dominican Order, dedicated to the Holy and Undivided Trinity. Black Abbey was established in 1225 as one of the first houses of the Dominican Order in Ireland.

The history of the Black Abbey is marked by several reversals of fortune under different governments.

== Name ==
The name Black Abbey derives from the use of the term "Black Friars" to describe members of the Dominican Order. This in turn derives from the black cappa or cloak which Dominicans wear over their white habits.

== Site ==
When the priory was founded the 13th century, the town of Kilkenny was divided into two parts by the Bregach River. One part was occupied mainly by indigenous Irish (Irishtown) and the other by English (Norman) settlers. The Dominicans established the priory between those two towns and outside the city walls because they wished to show their independence from either side.

In practical terms, the site chosen for the priory presented challenges, because ever since the priory was established, right up to the present time, the buildings are subject to annual flooding from the river.

== History ==
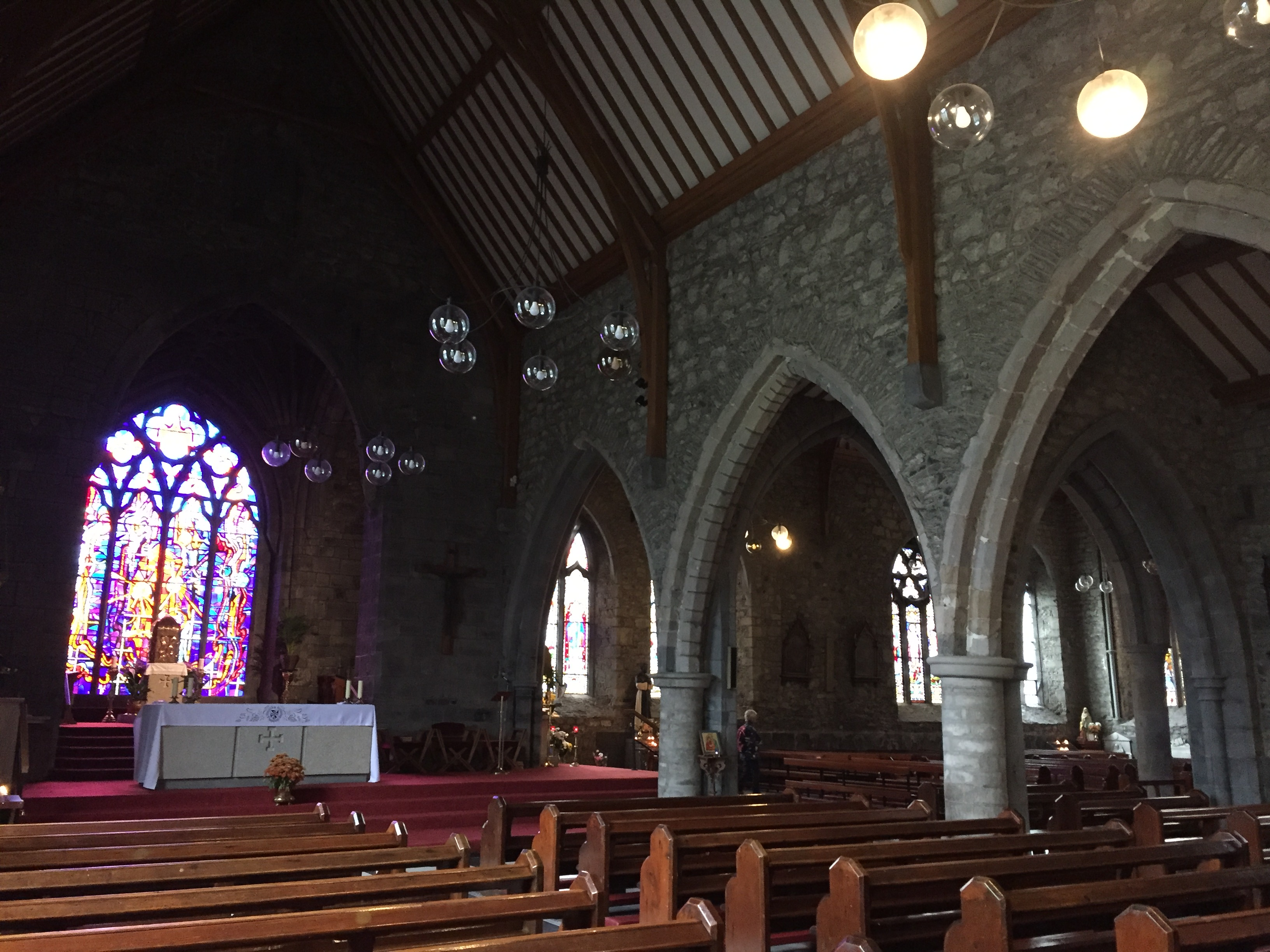
The interior of Black Abbey, the nave and transept

The priory was founded in 1225 by William Marshal the younger, Earl of Pembroke, who died in 1231.

In 1349, the community within the priory was affected by the outbreak of bubonic plague – known as the Black Death. According to John Clyn's Annals, eight members of the community died in three months during this pandemic. After the plague years, very few structural changes were carried out at the priory up until the end of the 15th century.

In 1558, Ireland was under the rule of Elizabeth I of England, a Protestant queen, and the property of the priory was confiscated by the crown. Elizabeth died in 1603, but the policies of the new Protestant king, James I, did not change: the priory became a courthouse, and the Dominicans were forced to leave and find places to stay in other houses.

From 1642 to 1649, the Black Abbey played a major part in attempting to save both the Irish Catholic religion and the king, Charles I of England and of Ireland; the abbey hosted the government known as the Irish Catholic Confederation. This effort did not last long, however. In March 1650, the English army under the command of Oliver Cromwell surrounded Kilkenny in a siege. Many people died from epidemic and hunger, and many more fled before the city finally surrendered.

From 1685 to 1689 under the rule of the Catholic king James II of England, the abbey flourished, but in 1690, under the rule of the Protestant king William III of England, both Kilkenny and the abbey were once again occupied by the English.

By 1776, the community of the Black Abbey was close to zero, but starting in that year, the Dominicans retook possession of the abbey, first by renting it. In 1816, Black Abbey was restored as a Dominican priory, and the first public mass was held on 25 September 1816.

On Trinity Sunday, 22 May 1864, Black Abbey was reconsecrated by the bishop, and was finally opened again as a house of prayer.

== Interior ==
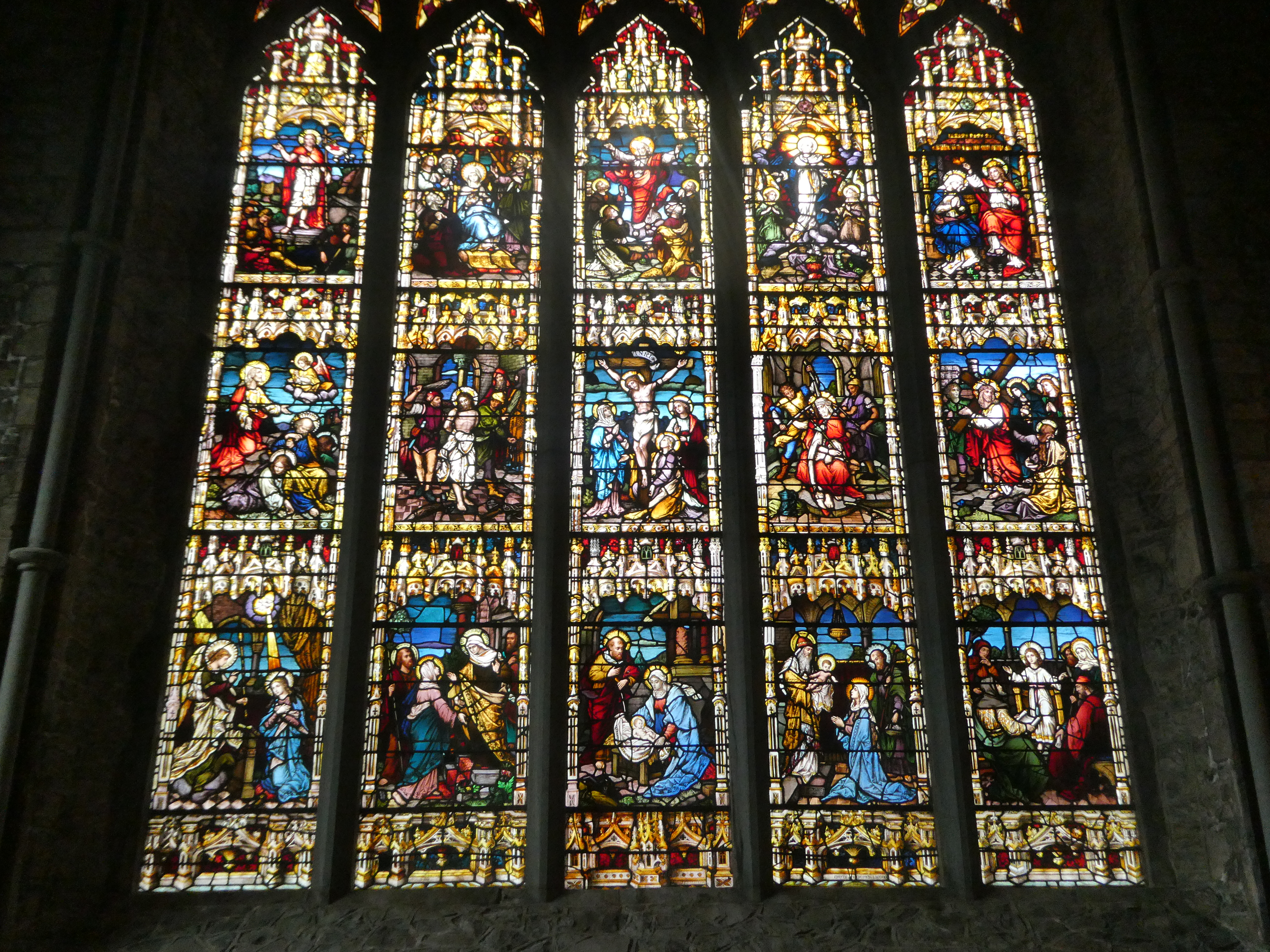
Rosary window in south transept. Top row: Glorious Mysteries — Resurrection, Pentecost, Ascension, Assumption, Coronation of the Virgin. Middle row: Sorrowful Mysteries — Agony in the Garden, Scourging, Crucifixion, Crowning with Thorns, Carrying the Cross. Bottom row: Joyful Mysteries — Annunciation, Visitation, Nativity, Presentation, Finding in the Temple.

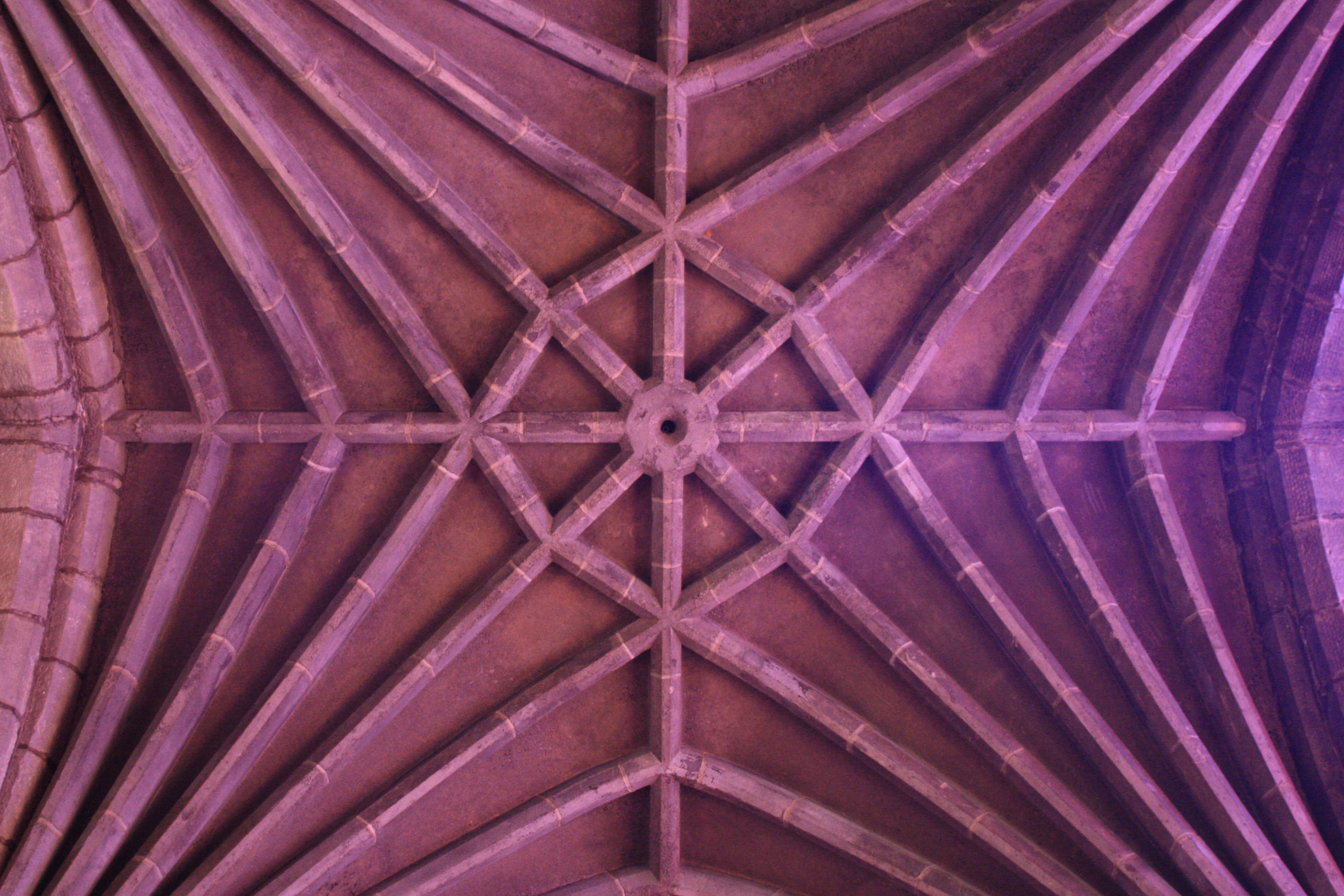
Ribbed vault ceiling (made mostly of timber in the 1970s) of Kilkenny Black Abbey

In nearly all cases, the main building of monasteries of the Dominicans and Franciscans in Ireland followed the same plan. There was a nave and a choir (pointing east), separated by a tower. From the tower or the nave, they had just one transept, pointing to the north or the south, in most cases with one aisle. In some cases, an aisle was also attached to the nave. Black Abbey followed this plan:

     +---------------------------------+      N
     |                 |      ^
     |  nave tower choir  |      |
     +  +  +  +  +    +---------+
     |  aisle        |
     +-----------+  +south |
           |  trans- |
           |  + ept |
           |      |
           |  +    |
           |      |
           +-----------+
              ^
              +------------- rosary window

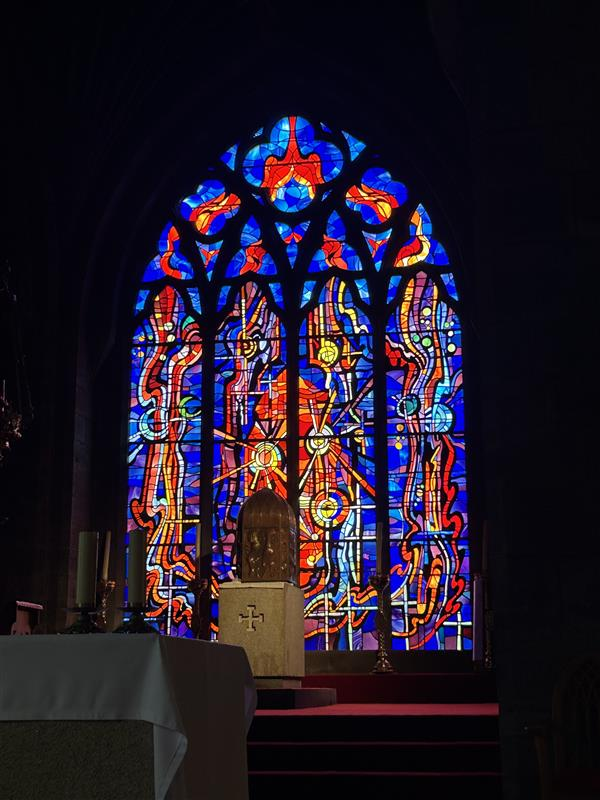
A stained glass window in the east nave

The original choir fell into ruin, and at the end of the 18th century, the stones were used to construct two-storey living quarters for the Dominican friars. This structure was used for 120 years. It was demolished to enable the reconstruction of the nave, which made possible the reconsecration of the abbey in 1864. (The south transept was restored first, and before the reconsecration, masses were held there.)

The nave leads to the altar below the tower. At the end of the South transept is the large stained glass window known as the "Rosary Window", which is composed of five "lights" or great vertical panels, and is the largest stained glass window in Ireland. This window was created in 1892 by Mayers of Munich, and depicts the Mysteries of the Rosary.

== See also ==
- List of monastic houses in Ireland
