= Álvaro de Mendoza (bishop) =

Most Reverend Álvaro de Mendoza
- Bishop of Jaca
- Church: Catholic Church
- Diocese: Diocese of Jaca
- In office: 1628–1631
- Predecessor: José Palafox Palafox
- Successor: Vicente Domec
- Previous post: Bishop of L'Aquila (1622–1628)

Orders
- Consecration: 20 November 1622 by Giovanni Garzia Mellini

Personal details
- Died: 1631 Jaca, Spain

Álvaro de Mendoza, O.F.M. or Alvaro Mendoza (died 1631) was a Catholic prelate who served as Bishop of Jaca (1628–1631) and earlier as Bishop of L'Aquila (1622–1628).

== Biography ==
Álvaro de Mendoza was ordained a priest in the Order of Friars Minor. On 14 November 1622, he was appointed Bishop of Aquila by Pope Paul V. On 20 November 1622, he was consecrated bishop by Giovanni Garzia Mellini, Cardinal-Priest of Santi Quattro Coronati with Benedetto Bragadin, Archbishop of Corfu, and Cesare Ventimiglia, Bishop of Terracina, Priverno e Sezze, serving as co-consecrators. On 29 May 1628, he was appointed during the papacy of Pope Urban VIII as Bishop of Jaca. He served as Bishop of Jaca until his death in 1631.

== External links and additional sources ==
- Cheney, David M. "Archdiocese of L'Aquila". Catholic-Hierarchy.org. (for Chronology of Bishops)^{self-published}
- Chow, Gabriel. "Metropolitan Archdiocese of L'Aquila". GCatholic.org. (for Chronology of Bishops)^{self-published}

Catholic Church titles
| Preceded by Gonzalo de Rueda | Bishop of L'Aquila; 1622–1628 | Succeeded by Gaspar Gajosa |
| Preceded by José Palafox Palafox | Bishop of Jaca; 1628–1631 | Succeeded by Vicente Domec |
