= Synod of Maynooth =

Synod of Maynooth (1875) was the second national synod of the Catholic Church in Ireland since the passing of the Catholic Emancipation Act, the first was the 1850 Synod of Thurles. It was the first synod to be held in Maynooth College. The synod was presided over by Cardinal Paul Cullen, and seen the church in Ireland become more centralised

Of the twenty seven prelates of the church who attended the synod twenty one were educated at Maynooth, Gerald Molloy and William Walsh acted as assistant secretaries to the council, with the principal part in drafting its decrees. The synod sanctioned an appeal to fundraise for the development of the College Chapel in Maynooth. The bishops also issued a letter condemning drunkenness although did not endorse temperance. The synod reiterated the Pope Pius IX strictures, and condemned Fenianism.

The synod commenced on 31 August and closed on 20 September 1875, the decrees were not published until they were approved of by the Holy See in 1876 and its provisions were formally promulgated in June 1876.

== See also ==
- Roman Catholicism in Ireland
