= Oriental Orthodoxy in the Republic of Ireland =

Oriental Orthodoxy in the Republic of Ireland is part of the Oriental Orthodox Christian tradition. Before the beginning of the 20th century, the presence of Oriental Orthodox Christianity in Ireland was minor, gradually increasing only in the second half of the century with immigration, mainly from the region of Middle East and India. Today, it is a growing community, well integrated into Irish society.

Adherents Oriental Orthodoxy in Ireland are largely of Indian origin, and they belong to the jurisdiction of the Syriac Orthodox Church and its main Indian branche: Malankara Jacobite Syrian Orthodox Church . A significant proportion of them are hospital employees. An important centre of activity is St. Gregorios' Syrian Orthodox Church in Arran Quay.

Other Oriental Orthodox communities in Ireland are:

- The Coptic Orthodox Church, that also has a growing presence in the country.
- The Ethiopian Orthodox Tewahedo Church in Dublin.

First established in 1993, St. Mary's and St. Demiana Coptic Church in Bray, Co. Wicklow serves both the Coptic and Ethiopian Orthodox communities.

In Drumcondra in Dublin, there is St.Maximus & St. Domatius Coptic Orthodox church.

== See also ==
- Christianity in Ireland
