= Diocese of Jaca =

Roman Catholic diocese in Spain

Coordinates: 42.5705°N 0.5493°W

Diocese of Jaca Dioecesis Iacensis Diócesis de Jaca

Catholic
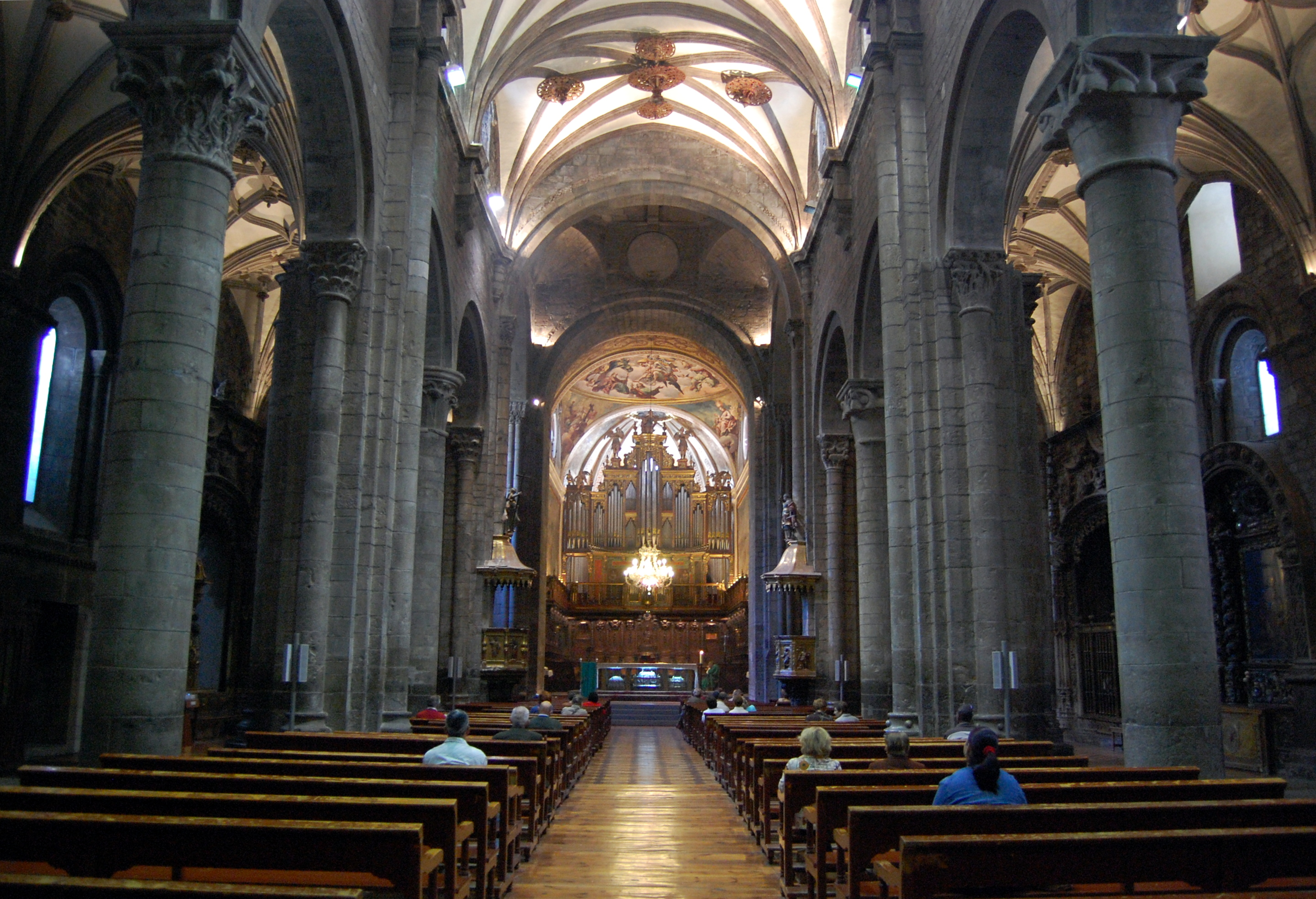
- Interior of Jaca Cathedral

Location
- Country: Spain
- Ecclesiastical province: Pamplona y Tudela
- Metropolitan: Pamplona y Tudela

Statistics
- Area: 5,896 km^{2} (2,276 sq mi)
- Population: Total; Catholics: (as of 2006); 46,800; 46,400 (99.1%)

Information
- Denomination: Catholic
- Sui iuris church: Latin Church
- Rite: Roman Rite
- Established: 1063
- Cathedral: Cathedral of St Peter in Jaca

Current leadership
- Pope: Leo XIV
- Bishop: Pedro Aguado Cuesta, Sch.P.
- Metropolitan Archbishop: Francisco Pérez González

Website
- diocesisdejaca.org

The Diocese of Jaca (Latin: Dioecesis Iacensis) is a Latin ecclesiastical territory or diocese of the Catholic Church in the northeastern Spanish province of Huesca, part of the autonomous community of Aragón. The diocese is a suffragan in the ecclesiastical province of the metropolitan Archdiocese of Pamplona y Tudela.

The territory of the Diocese of Jaca was originally administered by the Diocese of Huesca, but after the Moorish conquest of Huesca in 713, its bishops, (known as the itinerant "Bishops of Aragon"), moved to Aragon. The episcopal see was established in Jaca during 1063–1096, then moved back to Huesca after king Pedro I of Aragon retook the city from the Moors in November 1096. The Diocese of Jaca was created in 1572, carved out of the diocese of Huesca.

Jaca cathedral is dedicated to Saint Peter. Consecrated in the late 11th century and altered in the 15th–18th centuries, it is Romanesque in its architectural style. The church of San Adrián de Sasabe, in Sasabe (also in Huesca province) was an earlier diocesan cathedral.

A religious and civil festival is held on the first Friday of May, locally referred to as Primer Viernes de Mayo, in memory of a victory said to have been won over the Moors in the 8th century by Count Aznar aided by the women of Jaca. It is celebrated with a solemn procession in which the entire cathedral chapter takes part.

There are many hermitages around Jaca, but none more interesting than that of San Juan de la Peña, ensconced within a cave in the Pyrenees. This shrine was also a monastery, royal mausoleum and was claimed to be one of the many hiding places of the Holy Grail in the Middle Ages. It continues to be a stop along the Camino de Santiago for many pilgrims and tourists. In another cave, dedicated to La Virgen de la Cueva, locals gather annually to pay homage to Our Lady of the Cave, a venerated shrine where Garcí Ximénez was proclaimed first King of Sobrarbe in the 8th century.

== History ==
Jaca was once the capital of the Iacetani, a tribe mentioned by Strabo. This territory was the scene of battles between Sertorius and Pompey and later between Pompey's son Sextus and Caesar's generals.

=== Itinerant bishops of Aragon (713–1063) ===
Ecclesiastically, Jaca originally belonged to the Diocese of Huesca. When in 713 the town of Huesca was seized by the Moors, the bishop fled and the diocese was directed from Aragon by itinerant bishops, sometimes called bishops of Aragon, sometimes bishops of Huesca or Jaca, who lived either at Jaca or in the neighbouring monasteries of San Juan de la Peña, San Pedro de Siresa and San Adrián de Sasabe.

Among the itinerant bishops of Aragon were:

- c. 920: Iñigo
- c. 922: Ferriolus
- 933–947: Fortuño
- 971–978: Aureolus
- c. 981: Atón
- 1011–1036: Mancius
- 1036–1057: García
- 1058–1075: Sancho
- 1058–1075: Sancho
- 1076–1086: García Ramírez
- 1087–1097: Peter

A council held at Jaca in 1063 determined anew the boundaries of the Diocese of Huesca, which thereafter included the present dioceses of Huesca, Jaca and Barbastro, as well as a part of the Diocese of Lérida. Jaca was then made the permanent seat of the diocese.

At the same time Sancho was appointed Bishop of Huesca (1058–1075) and hastened to request the Pope Alexander II to confirm the decisions of the council. In the same year of 1063, however, King Sancho Ramirez of Aragon (1063–1094) had won back from the Moors the city of Barbastro, and had granted it to the Bishop of Roda. García Ramírez, the new Bishop of Huesca (1076–1086) and brother of the king, regarded this as an infringement of the rights of jurisdiction granted the Bishop of Jaca by the Council of Jaca. He therefore renewed his petition to the new pope (Gregory VII) to have the decisions of the council confirmed, which request the pope granted (cf. Jaffé, "Reg. Pont. Roman", I, 2nd ed., Berlin, 1885, n. 5098). As, however, Bishop Raimundo of Roda also obtained the confirmation of all his privileges from Gregory, a violent dispute arose between the Bishops of Huesca and Roda as to jurisdiction over the churches of Barbastro, Bielsa, Gistao and Alquezar, which in 1080 was decided by the king in favour of the Bishop of Roda.

=== The episcopal see returns to Huesca (1096–1572) ===
In November 1096, King Pedro I of Aragon conquered Huesca from the taifa of Zaragoza and restored the original see. Pope Urban II decreed (May 11, 1098) that, instead of Jaca, Huesca should again be the seat of the bishop, as it had been until the year 713 (cf. Jaffé, "Reg. Pont. Roman", I, 2nd ed., Berlin, 1885, n. 5703). But Jaca itself had a separate existence under a vicar-general, independent of the Bishop of Huesca. It also retained its own cathedral chapter, which originally followed the Rule of St. Augustine, but in 1270 both this chapter and that of Huesca were secularized.

=== Diocese of Jaca (1572 to the present) ===
Jaca was again erected into a separate diocese and was made suffragan to the Metropolitan See of Zaragoza by a Bull of Pope Pius V (July 18, 1571), which decision was carried into effect on February 26, 1572. The first bishop was Pedro del Frago.

According to the diocesan statistics of 1907 Jaca possessed 73,659 inhabitants, 151 parishes, 151 parish churches, 239 public and 10 private oratories, 236 secular priests, 30 regulars and 54 sisters. The religious institutes in the diocese are:

- Augustinian Hermits, one monastery and novitiate;
- Piarists, 2 houses for the training of boys;
- Benedictine nuns, 1 convent and 18 professed sisters in the city of Jaca;
- Sisters of Mercy of St. Anna, who have charge of the hospital at Jaca;
- Sisters of the Sacred Heart of Mary, 1 house at Jaca; sisters of Mercy of St. Vincent de Paul, with a school at Jaca;
- Little Sisters of the Aged Poor, with a home for the aged in a suburb of Jaca.

== Bishops of Jaca (1572 to the present) ==
1. 1572–1577: Pedro del Frago
  - 1577: Juan Pérez de Arneda (elected, did not assume)
2. 1578–1583: Gaspar Juan de la Figuera
3. 1584–1592: Pedro de Aragón
4. 1592–1594: Diego de Monreal
5. 1594–1606: Malaquías de Aso
6. 1607–1614: Tomás Cortés de Sangüesa
7. 1614–1615: Diego Ordóñez
8. 1615–1616: Pedro Fernández Zorrilla
9. 1616–1617: Felipe Guimerán
10. 1617–1622: Luis Díez Aux de Armendáriz
11. 1623–1626: Juan Estelrich
12. 1627: José Palafox Palafox
13. 1628–1631: Álvaro de Mendoza (bishop)
14. 1631–1635: Vicente Domec
15. 1635–1646: Mauro de Villarroel
16. 1647–1648: Juan Domingo Briz de Trujillo
17. 1649–1652: Jerónimo de Ipenza
18. 1655–1671: Bartolomé de Fontcalda
19. 1671–1673: Andrés Aznar Navés
20. 1673–1674: José de Santolaria
21. 1677–1683: Bernardo Mateo Sánchez de Castellar
22. 1683–1704: Miguel de Frías Espintel
23. 1705–1717: Mateo Foncillos Mozárabe
24. 1717–1720: Francisco Polanco
25. 1721–1727: Miguel Estela
26. 1728: Antonio Sarmiento
27. 1728–1733: Pedro Espinosa de los Monteros
28. 1734–1738: Ramón Nogués
29. 1739–1750: Juan Domingo Manzano Carvajal
30. 1751–1755: Esteban Vilanova Colomer
31. 1756–1776: Pascual López Estaún
32. 1777–1779: Andrés Pérez Bermúdez
33. 1780–1784: Julián Gascueña
34. 1785–1802: José Antonio López Gil
35. 1803–1814: Lorenzo Algüero Ribera
36. 1815–1822: Cristóbal Pérez Viala
37. 1824–1828: Leonardo Santander Villavicencio
38. 1829–1831: Pedro Rodríguez Miranda
39. 1832–1847: Manuel María Gómez de las Rivas
40. 1848–1851: Miguel García Cuesta
41. 1852–1856: Juan José Biec Belio
42. 1857–1870: Pedro Lucas Asensio Poves
43. 1874–1890: Ramón Fernández Lafita
44. 1891–1899: José López Mendoza y García
45. 1900–1904: Francisco Javier Valdés Noriega
46. 1904–1913: Antolín López Peláez
47. 1913–1920: Manuel de Castro Alonso
48. 1920–1925: Francisco Frutos Valiente
49. 1926–1943: Juan Villar Sanz
50. 1946–1950: José Bueno y Monreal
51. 1950–1978: Ángel Hidalgo Ibáñez
52. 1978–1983: Juan Angel Belda Dardiñá
53. 1984–1989: Rosendo Álvarez Gastón
54. 1990–2001: José María Conget Arizaleta
  - 2001–2003: Juan José Omella Omella (Apostolic Administrator)
55. 2003–2010: Jesús Sanz Montes
  - 2010–2011: Jesús Sanz Montes (Apostolic Administrator)
56. 2011–2023: Julián Ruiz Martorell
  - 2024–2025: Vicente Jiménez Zamora (Apostolic Administrator)
57. 2025–: Pedro Aguado Cuesta

== See also ==
- List of the Roman Catholic dioceses of Spain.
