= Gaudiosus of Tarazona =

6th-century Spanish bishop

Saint
- Died: ~540 AD
- Venerated in: Catholic Church; Eastern Orthodox Church
- Major shrine: cathedral of Tarazona
- Feast: November 3

Gaudiosus (died c. 540) was the Bishop of Tarazona, Spain. He is venerated as a saint in the Catholic Church.

== Life ==
The information concerning the life of this bishop is scant, and rests on comparatively late sources. On the occasion of the translation of his remains in 1573, a sketch of his life was discovered in the grave, written on parchment; apart from the Breviary lessons of the Cathedral of Tarazona, this document contains the only extant written details concerning the life of Gaudiosus.

His father, Guntha, was a military official (spatharius) at the court of the Visigothic King Theodoric the Great from 510 to 525. The education of the boy was entrusted to Victorian of Asan, abbot of a monastery near Burgos (Oca), who trained him for the service of the Church.

Later (c. 530) he was appointed Bishop of Tarazona. Nothing more is known of his activities. Even the year of his death has not been exactly determined.

== Veneration ==
After his death, Gaudiosus was venerated as a saint. According to the manuscript life found in his grave he died on 29 October, but the Church of Tarazona celebrates his feast on 3 November. He was first entombed in the church of St. Martin (dedicated later to St. Victorianus), attached to the monastery where he had spent his youthful years.

In 1573 his remains were disinterred and translated to the cathedral of Tarazona.

== See also ==
- Gaudiosus of Naples
- Tarazona, the capital of this Aragonese comarca
  - Tarazona y el Moncayo, the Aragonese comarca
  - Roman sites in Spain category
  - Tarazona Cathedral
- Moncayo Massif Redirected from Moncayo)
  - el Moncayo (mountain range, sierra, mountain chain; and the peak, the summit). Sistema Ibérico (Iberian System)
  - Mountain ranges of the Sistema Ibérico, template
  - Two-thousanders of Spain category, ie. both at the Moncayo article
- Moncayo (disambiguation)
