= Diocese of Tarazona =

Roman Catholic diocese in Spain

Diocese of Tarazona Dioecesis Turiasonensis Diócesis de Tarazona

Catholic
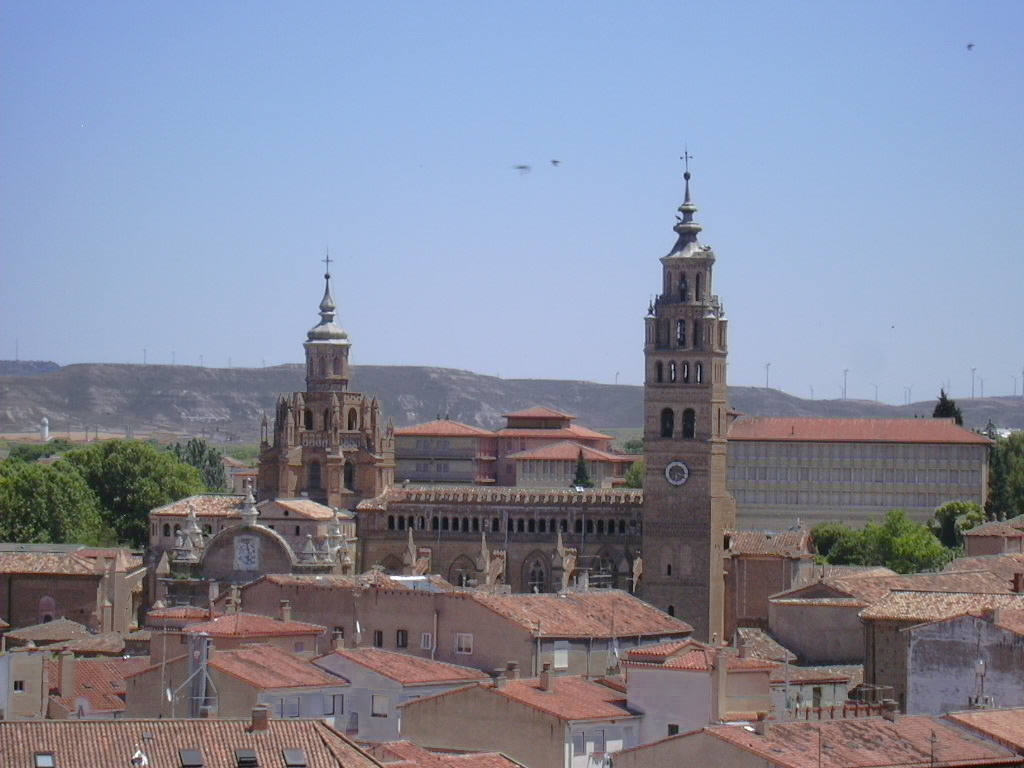
- Tarazona Cathedral

Location
- Country: Spain
- Ecclesiastical province: Zaragoza
- Metropolitan: Zaragoza
- Coordinates: 41.9025°N 1.7250°W

Statistics
- Area: 4,514 km^{2} (1,743 sq mi)
- Population: Total; Catholics: (as of 2010); 87,505; 74,250 (84.9%)

Information
- Denomination: Catholic
- Sui iuris church: Latin Church
- Rite: Roman Rite
- Established: 5th Century
- Cathedral: Cathedral of St Anne in Tarazona

Current leadership
- Pope: Leo XIV
- Bishop: Vicente Rebollo Mozos
- Metropolitan Archbishop: Carlos Manuel Escribano Subías
- Bishops emeritus: Eusebio Hernández Sola

Map
- Diocese of Tarazona, administrative divisions

Website
- diocesistarazona.org

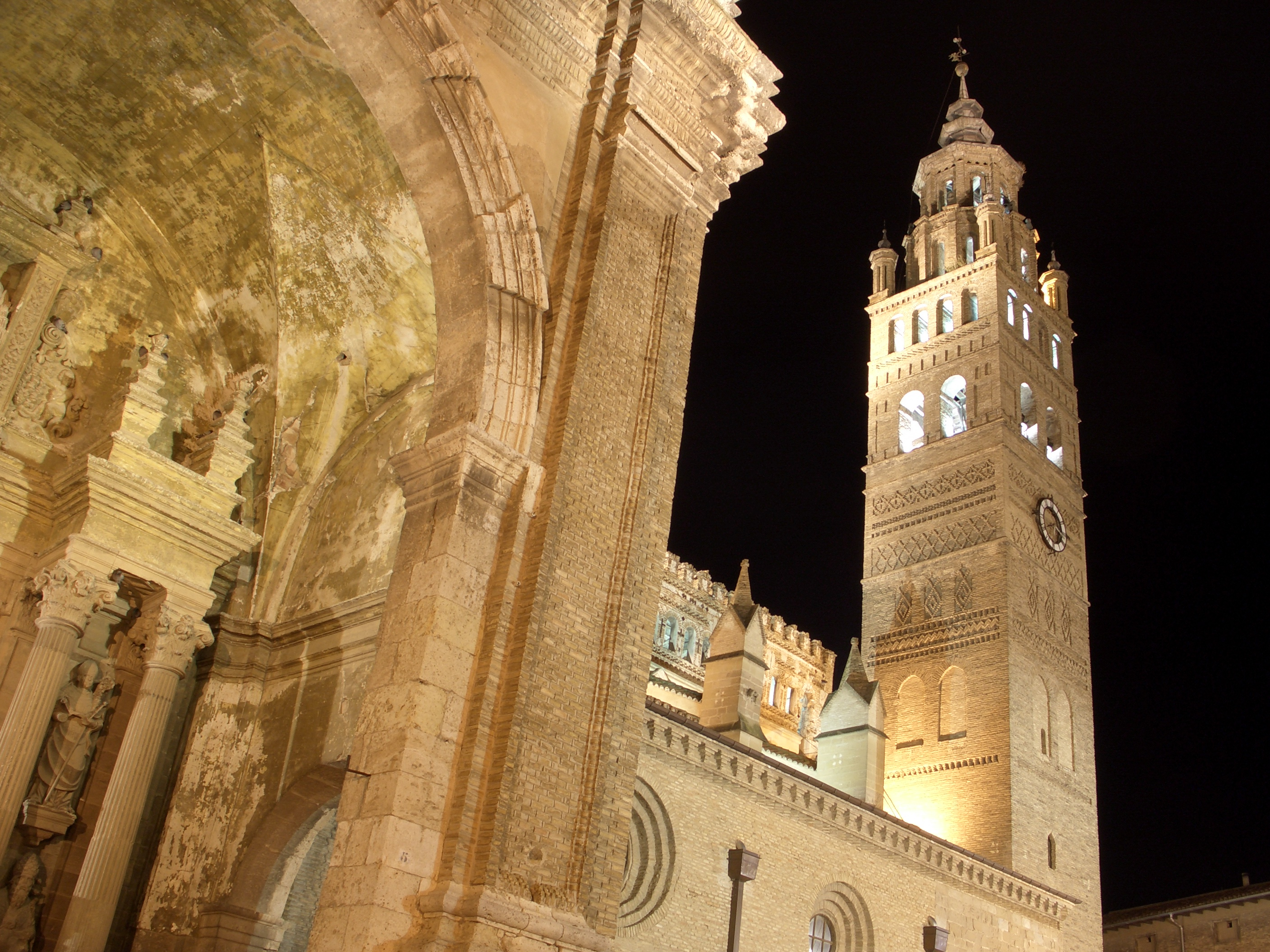
Cathedral of Tarazona

The Diocese of Tarazona (Latin: Dioecesis Turiasonensis) is a Latin diocese of the Catholic Church located in north-eastern Spain, in the provinces of Zaragoza, Soria, Navarre and La Rioja, forming part of the autonomous communities of Aragón, Castile-Leon, Navarre and La Rioja. The diocese forms part of the ecclesiastical province of Zaragoza, and is thus suffragan to the Archdiocese of Zaragoza.

== Episcopal see ==
The city of Tarazona is situated on a commanding point, surrounded by an open plain, through which the river Queiles flows.

== Cathedral ==
The Church of the Magdalene was the ancient cathedral, but the Moors, objecting to its prominent position, compelled them to use a church on the outskirts of the town. In the records left by Miguel this was variously called Santa Maria de la Hidria, de la Vega, or de la Huerta, on account of its position. It was endowed by Teresa Cajal, mother of Pedro de Atarés and wife of García Sánchez, and was begun in 1152.

Architecturally, it is a combination of Byzantine and Gothic, with a high portico entrance and a high brick-trimmed tower. The centre nave with its pointed arches rises above the side aisles and merges into a spacious transept. In the windows Gothic gives place to Plateresque, but in the side chapels dedicated to St. Lawrence, St. Andrew, the Rosary, St. Peter, the Beheading of St. John the Baptist, the Annunciation, St. Elizabeth of Portugal, the Purification and St. James the Great, Gothic prevails in the reredos and tombs.

Bishop Moncada attempted to rebuild the beautiful cloister which had been destroyed in the War of the Two Peters, but as late as 1529 this had not been completed.

== Other churches ==
Besides the Church of the Magdalene, the Church of St. Michael, with its simple Gothic nave, and that of the Conception nuns, are also notable.

The Church of St. Francis is said to have been founded by Saint Francis of Assisi himself in 1214, and Francisco Jiménez de Cisneros was consecrated archbishop of Toledo in the Chapel of La Piedad in 1495.

The episcopal palace, the ancient Azuda, is built upon a commanding eminence and has a beautiful view. Bishop Pedro Pérez Calvillo purchased this from the Aragonese governor, Jordán Pérez de Urries, in 1386, and entailed it to the bishopric.

The diocesan seminary, dedicated to St. Gaudiosus, was founded in 1593 by Bishop Pedro Cerbuna. It has recently been extensively renovated.

Mention should be made of the monastery of Nuestra Señora de Veruela, a Cistercian abbey founded by Pedro de Atarés, and now a Jesuit novitiate; also of the Church of Borja, ranking as a collegiate church since the time of Pope Nicholas V (1449), favoured and protected by Pope Alexander VI; and of the ancient collegiate church of Calatayud, Santa Maria de Mediavilla, whose priors ranked as mitred deans.

== History ==
=== Roman period ===
Turiaso was one of the principal towns of the ancient Celtiberian province, and within the confines of the diocese are found many very ancient cities: Bilbilis (Calatayud); Aquae Bilbilitanorum (Alhama); Atacum (Ateca); Augustobriga (Muro); Boverca (Buvierca); Bursao (Borja); Cascantum (Cascante); Gracuris (Corella); Monóbriga (Munébrega); and Vergegium (Verdejo). Pliny the Elder numbers Tarazona among the principal cities of the Celtiberians, and its inhabitants had the privileges of citizenship. Its coat of arms bore the motto "Tubal-Cain built me and Hercules rebuilt me".

Nothing definite is known of the origin of Christianity in Tarazona. Owing to its proximity to Saragossa it is supposed that it was visited at an early date by the disciples of Saint James the Great, but until the 5th century there is no reliable mention of a bishop of Tarazona.

=== Visigoth period (5th to 7th centuries) ===
The chronicler Idatius names Leo as bishop in 449; the chronological list of bishops gives St. Prudentius, but the history of this saint is uncertain. The Tarazona Breviary gives 390 as his date, but other sources place him as late as the 9th century. Idatius says that Leo was killed in an uprising led by a certain Basilius where the Bagandae took refuge in the cathedral, and in which a great number were killed.

St. Gaudiosus, a former monk of the Monastery of Asanense and a disciple of St. Victorian(us), was bishop in 530. He worked against the Arians, and died in his native city, Escoron. His remains were translated to the Monastery of Asanense, and King Sancho Ramirez had them removed to Montearagón.

St. Braulius, in his life of St. Emilianus, speaks of a Didymus, Bishop of Tarazona. A Bishop Stephen assisted at the Third Council of Toledo (589) and at the Second Council of Zaragoza (592); Floridius assisted at the Council of Gundemar (611); Elpidius, at the Fourth and Fifth Council of Toledo (633 and 636); Antherius (683) sent a deacon to represent him at the Thirteenth Council of Toledo (683); and Nepotianus assisted at the Fifteenth and Seventeenth Council of Toledo (688 and 694). He seems to have been the last bishop of the Visigothic epoch.

=== Moorish period (early 8th century – 1119) ===
When the Moors took Tarazona they were able to hold it for a long time on account of its fortified position near the Sierra del Moncayo, between the Douro and the Ebro rivers. The saints Attilanus and Iñigo of Calatayud were from this period.

=== After the Reconquest (1119–today) ===
King Alfonso I the Battler of Aragon took possession of Tarazona in 1119, and named Miguel Cornel as bishop. King Alfonso VII of Castile, in an effort to get possession of Tarazona, intruded a certain de Bujedo into the see; but de Bujedo repented shortly afterwards, restored the see to its rightful owner, Miguel, and retired to the Monastery of Valpuesta.

The Council of Burgos, which was convened in 1139, and was presided over by the legate Guido, took from the jurisdiction of Tarazona most of the towns of Soria, but bestowed in its place the Archdeaconry of Calatayud.

Miguel Cornel was the real restorer of the see. He governed for thirty-three years (1118–1151), and established the chapters of Tarazona, Calatayud, and Tudela, under the Rule of St. Augustine. In his time also were founded the Monasteries of Fitero and Veruela.

Three bishops of the name of Frontin succeeded him: Juan (1173–1194); Garcia, who was present at the battle of Las Navas de Tolosa (1212), and Garcia II, the counsellor of James the Conqueror (el Conquistador). In a species of national council held at Tarazona, the marriage of James to Leonor of Castile was declared null on account of the relationship existing between them. The Franciscans, Mercedarians, Dominicans, and Trinitarians, and the Cistercian and Poor Clare nuns were established in the diocese at this time.

Miguel Jiménez de Urrea, bishop from 1309 to 1316, was protected by king James II of Aragon, and during the time of Pedro Pérez Calvillo the war between Pedro IV the Ceremonious (el Ceremonioso) of Aragon and Pedro the Cruel of Castile took place. Tarazona was laid waste and its cathedral desecrated by the Castilians. The episcopal palace was burned, and la Zuda, sometimes also called Alcázar de Hércules, the palace of the Arab governors, was taken to replace it.

== Bishops of Tarazona ==
- ca. 449 : : Leo — (Mentioned in 449)
- ca. 516 : : Paul — (Mentioned in 516)
- 527–541 : St. Gaudiosus
- ca. 560 : : Didymus — (Mentioned in 560)
- 572–580 : St. Prudentius
- 589–592 : Stephen
- ca. 610 : : Floridius — (Mentioned in 610)
- ca. 635 : : Elpidius — (Mentioned between 633 and 638)
- ca. 683 : : Antherius — (Mentioned in 683)
- ca. 690 : : Nepotianus — (Mentioned between 688 and 693)

8th to 11th centuries: Under Moorish rule.

1. 1118–1151 : Miguel Cornel
2. 1151–1169 : Martín Vergua
3. 1170–1172 : Berenguer
4. 1172–1194 : Juan Frontin
5. 1195–1218 : García Frontin I
6. 1219–1254 : García Frontin II
7. --------- 1257 : Pedro I
8. 1258–1263 : García III
9. --------- 1263 : Alfonso
10. 1270–1277 : Fortuño
11. 1280–1289 : García IV
12. 1289–1304 : Pedro II
13. 1305–1308 : Pedro III
14. 1309–1317 : Miguel Jiménez de Urrea
15. 1317–1321 : Pedro Arnau de Torres
16. 1324–1342 : Beltrán de Cornidela
17. 1343–1346 : Sancho López de Ayerbe
18. 1346–1352 : Gaufrido
19. 1354–1391 : Pedro Pérez Calvillo
20. 1391–1404 : Fernando Pérez Calvillo
21. 1404–1405 : Berenguer de Ribalta
22. 1405–1407 : Francisco Clemente Pérez Capera
23. 1407–1433 : Juan de Valtierra
24. 1435–1443 : Martín Cerdán
25. 1443–1463 : Jorge Bardají, or 1443–1464, son of an Aragonese magistrate.
26. 1464–1478 : Cardinal Pedro Ferriz, favourite of Popes Paul II and Sixtus IV.
27. 1478–1495 : Andrés Martínez Ferriz
28. 1496–1521 : Guillermo Ramón de Moncada — (or Guillén Ramón de Moncada)
29. 1523–1535 : Gabriel de Ortí
30. 1537–1546 : Hércules Gonzaga — (son of Francesco II Gonzaga, Marquis of Mantua).
31. 1546–1567 : Juan González de Munébrega
  - 1567–1572 : See vacant
32. 1572–1574 : Pedro Martínez de Luna
33. 1577–1584 : Juan de Redín y Cruzat
34. 1585–1597 : Pedro Cerbuna, founder of the seminary and of the University of Zaragoza.
35. 1599–1613 : Diego de Yepes
36. 1614–1630 : Martín Terrer de Valenzuela
37. 1630–1631 : Pedro de Herrera
38. 1631–1642 : Baltasar de Navarra y Arroytia
39. 1644–1655 : Diego Castejón Fonseca
40. 1656–1659 : Pedro Manero
41. 1660–1664 : Diego Escolano y Ledesma
42. 1664–1673 : Miguel Escartín
43. 1673–1682 : Diego Francés de Urritigoyti y Lerma
44. 1683–1700 : Bernardo Mateo Sánchez de Castellar
45. 1701–1718 : Blas Serrate
46. 1720–1741 : García Pardiñas Villar de Francos
47. 1741–1755 : José Alcaraz y Belluga
48. 1755–1766 : Esteban Vilanova Colomer
49. 1766–1795 : José Laplana y Castellón
50. 1795–1802 : Damián Martínez de Galinsoga
51. 1803–1814 : Francisco Porró y Reinado
52. 1815–1835 : Jerónimo Castellón y Salas, last Inquisitor General of Spain.
53. 1848–1852 : Vicente Ortíz y Labastida
54. 1855–1857 : Gil Esteve y Tomás
55. 1857–1888 : Cosme Marrodán y Rubio
56. 1889–1901 : Juan Soldevila y Romero
57. 1902–1905 : José María Salvador y Barrera
58. 1905–1916 : Santiago Ozcoide y Udave
59. 1917–1926 : Isidoro Badía y Sarradell
60. 1927–1933 : Isidro Gomá y Tomás
61. 1935–1946 : Nicanor Mutiloa e Irurita
62. 1947–1966 : Manuel Hurtado y García
63. 1968–1971 : José Méndez Asensio
  - 1971–1973 : See vacant
64. 1973–1976 : Francisco Álvarez Martínez
65. 1976–1981 : Victorio Oliver Domingo
66. 1982–1989 : Ramón Búa Otero
67. 1990–1995 : Miguel José Asurmendi Aramendía
68. 1996–2004 : Joaquín Carmelo Borobia Isasa
69. 2004–2010 : Demetrio Fernández González; appointed Bishop of Cordoba, Spain
70. 2011–2022 : Eusebio Ignacio Hernández Sola
71. 2022–present : Vicente Rebollo Mozos

== See also ==
- List of the Roman Catholic dioceses of Spain.

== Sources ==
- (in Spanish) IBERCRONOX: Obispado de Tarazona (Turiaso)
