= Gaudiosus =

Gaudiosus may refer to:

- St. Gaudiosus of Naples
- St. Gaudiosus of Tarazona
