= Carmelo Borobia =

Spanish prelate of the Catholic Church (1939–2022)

The Most Reverend Carmelo Borobia
- Auxiliary Bishop Emeritus of Toledo
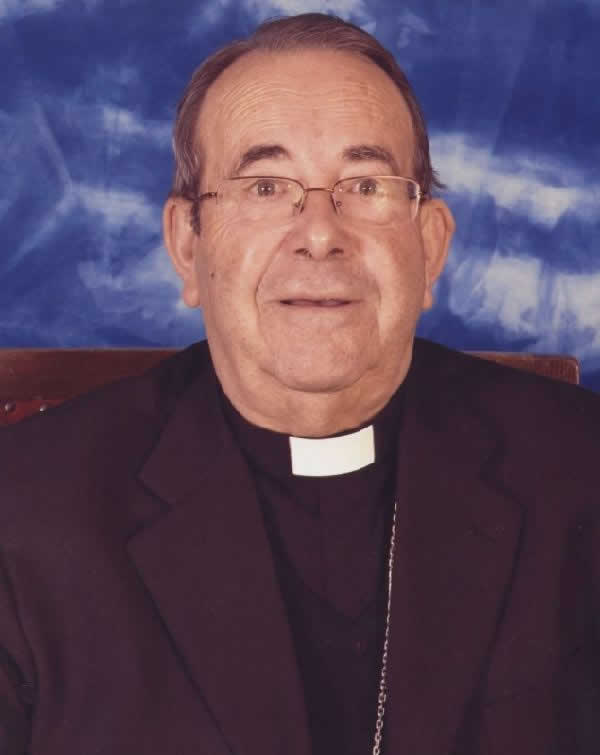
- Diocese: Toledo
- Appointed: 21 October 2004
- Term ended: 3 December 2010
- Other post: Titular Bishop of Rubicon (2004–2022)
- Previous posts: Auxiliary Bishop of Zaragoza and Titular Bishop of Elo (1990–1996); Bishop of Tarazona (1996–2004)

Orders
- Ordination: 19 July 1959
- Consecration: 9 June 1990 by Elías Yanes Álvarez

Personal details
- Born: 16 August 1939 Cortes, Navarre, Spain
- Died: 23 April 2022 (aged 82) Zaragoza, Spain
- Motto: A Ti Me Arrimo (I Come To You)
- Coat of arms: Carmelo Borobia's coat of arms

Styles of Carmelo Borobia
- Reference style: His Excellency; The Most Reverend
- Spoken style: Your Excellency
- Religious style: Bishop

Joaquín Carmelo Borobia Isasa (16 August 1939 – 23 April 2022) was a Spanish prelate of the Catholic Church.

Borobia Isasa was born in Spain and was ordained to the priesthood in 1959. He served as auxiliary bishop of the Roman Catholic Archdiocese of Zaragoza, Spain and as titular bishop of Elo from 1990 to 1996. He then served as bishop of the Roman Catholic Diocese of Tarazona, Spain, from 1996 to 2004 and then as auxiliary bishop of the Roman Catholic Archdiocese of Toledo, Spain and as titular bishop of Rubicon from 1994 until his retirement.

Catholic Church titles
Preceded by —	Auxiliary Bishop of Toledo; 2004–2010	Succeeded by —
Preceded by Stanisław Gądecki	Titular Bishop of Rubicon; 2004–2022	Succeeded by Sede vacante
Preceded by Miguel José Asurmendi Aramendía	Bishop of Tarazona; 1996–2004	Succeeded by Demetrio Fernández González
Preceded by —	Auxiliary Bishop of Zaragoza; 1990–1996	Succeeded by —
Preceded by Miguel Irízar Campos	Titular Bishop of Elio; 1990–1996	Succeeded by Manuel Gerardo Donoso
