= Fonz, Huesca =

Coordinates: 42°1′N 0°15′E

Fonz
- municipality
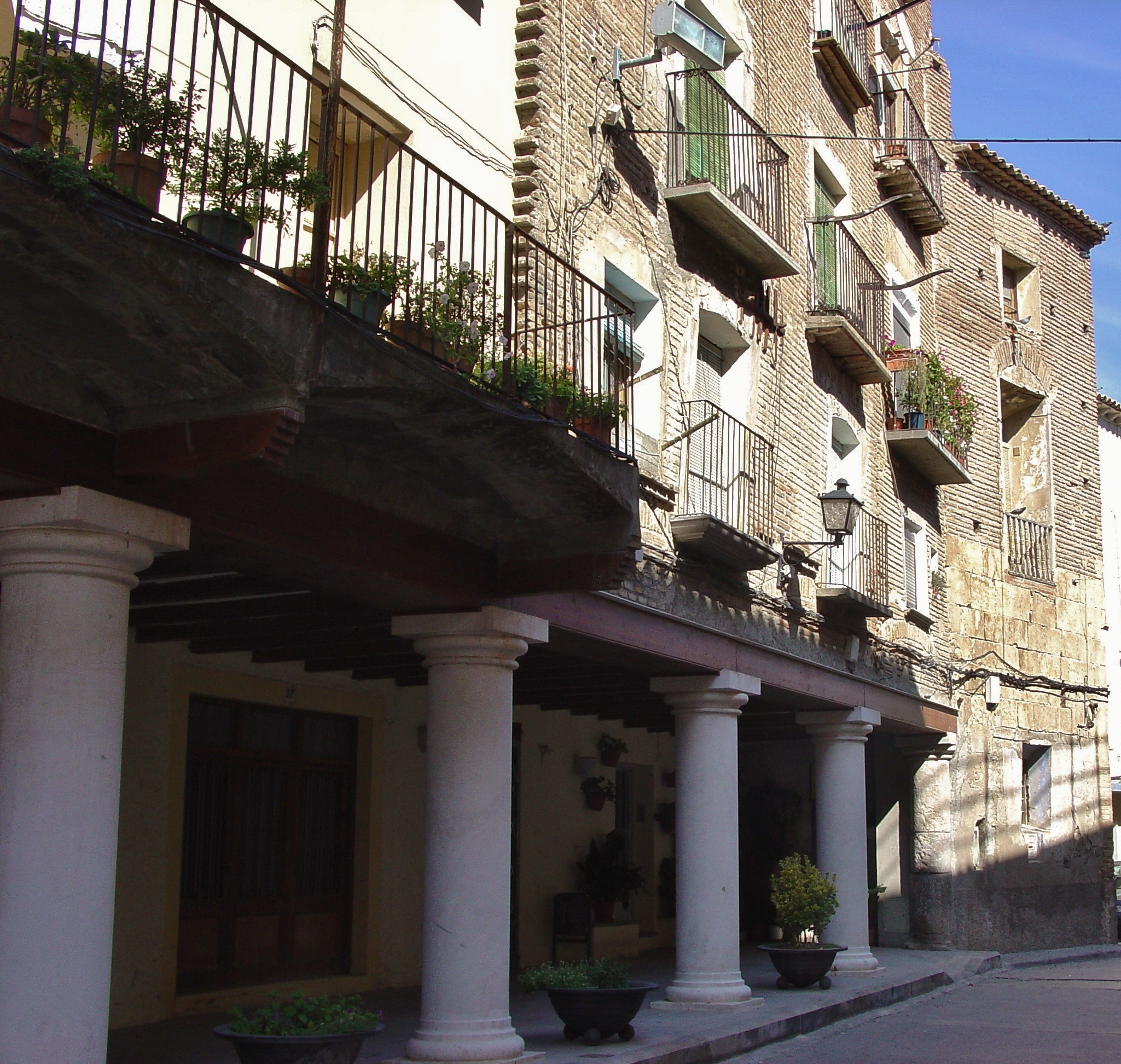
- Interactive map of Fonz
- Country: Spain
- Autonomous community: Aragon
- Province: Huesca
- Municipality: Fonz

Area
  - Total: 51.86 km^{2} (20.02 sq mi)

Population (2025-01-01)
  - Total: 886
  - Density: 17.1/km^{2} (44.2/sq mi)
- Time zone: UTC+1 (CET)
  - Summer (DST): UTC+2 (CEST)

Fonz is a municipality located in the province of Huesca, Aragon, Spain. It had a population of 960 inhabitants in 2014.

== Geography ==
Fonz is located south of the Pyrenees mountains in Aragon, near Catalonia. The region where it is located is the Middle Cinca and the biggest nearby towns are Monzón and Barbastro.

== Climate ==
Its average annual temperature is 13.2 °C (55.8 °F) and the annual precipitation is 475 mm (18.7 in).

== History ==
In the municipality of Fonz are several archaeological sites from the Iron Age and the Bronze Age, such as the Tozal of Gaya and the Urría.

== Heritage ==
Fonz has an important heritage. It has a declared Artistic Historical Monument Square from 1976, an interesting church, and various palaces scattered in different places of the town, such as the Gómez Alba Palace, Casa Ric and Casa Moner, where Pedro Cerbuna, founder of the University of Zaragoza, was born.

== Gastronomy ==
Pork croquettes and lamb ribs are very typical in Fonz. For dessert there is a pumpkin dish (pastillos) and muffins, the roll of San Blas... It is well known for its extra virgin olive oil, produced and packaged in Fonz.

== See also ==
- List of municipalities in Huesca
