= Tarazona Cathedral =

Roman Catholic church in Tarazona, Spain

Coordinates: 41.9028°N 1.7251°W

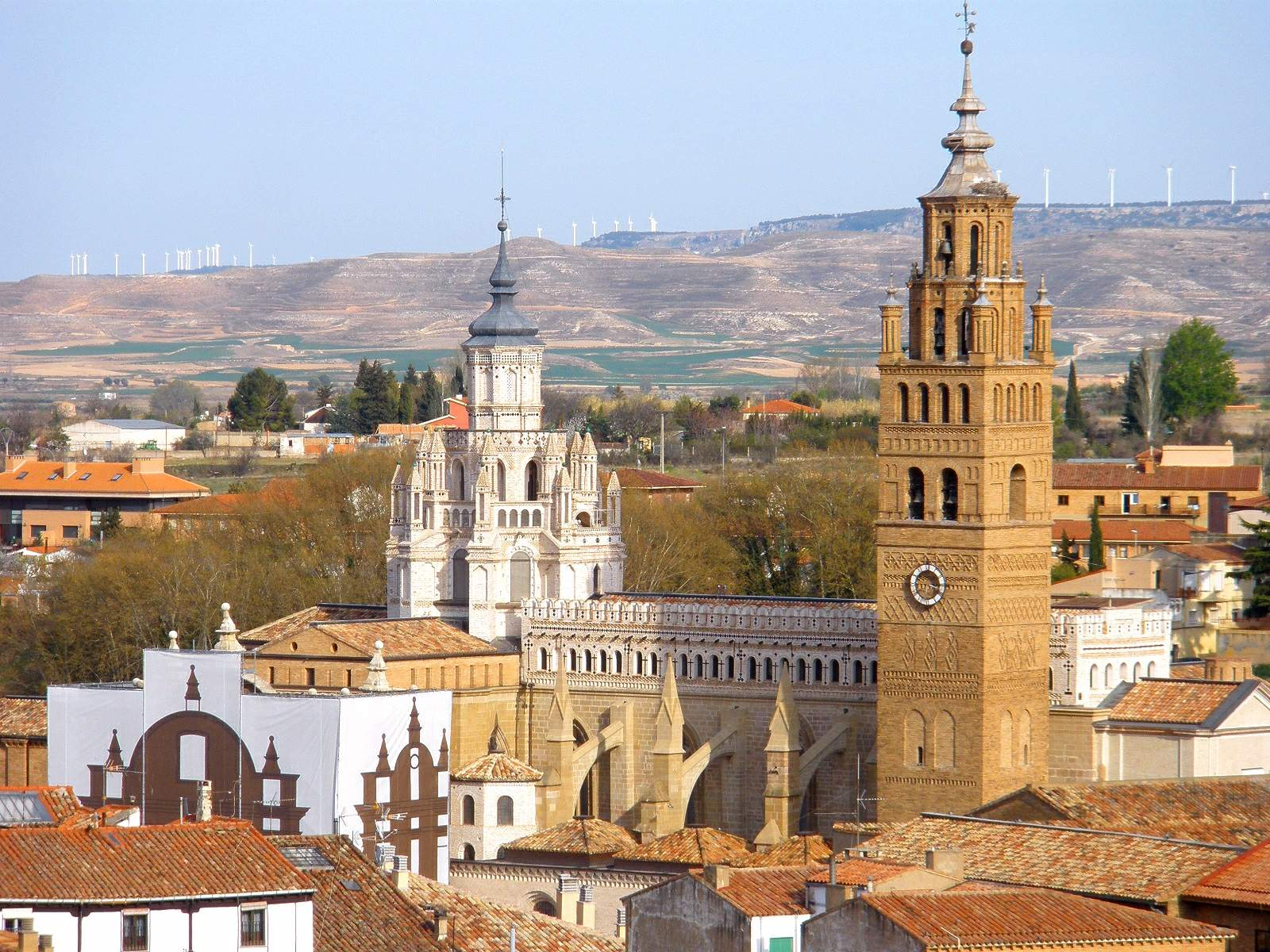
Tarazona Cathedral

Tarazona Cathedral (Catedral de Nuestra Señora de la Huerta de Tarazona, originally Iglesia de Nuestra Señora de la Hidria or Nuestra Señora de la Huerta o de la Vega) is a Roman Catholic church located in Tarazona, Zaragoza province, in Aragon, Spain. The cathedral's architecture is representative of the Gothic and Mudéjar style, and is one of the few remaining examples of this type of architecture, along with Teruel Cathedral.

== History ==
Construction on this cathedral first began in the 12th century in the French Gothic style, and it was consecrated in 1232.

The cathedral was located outside of the city walls, which was unusual, and may have been caused by the fact that there was an ancient Mozarabic church on the site which had been located outside of the formerly Moorish city.

In the fourteenth century, being outside of the city walls, it was assaulted and destroyed during the War of the Two Peters. Its naves were then rebuilt with Mudéjar decorations, as well as its lateral chapels, exterior walls, dome (cimborio), and tower. The tower was rebuilt in the fifteenth century.

The monastery at Veruela was built nearby in Gothic style.

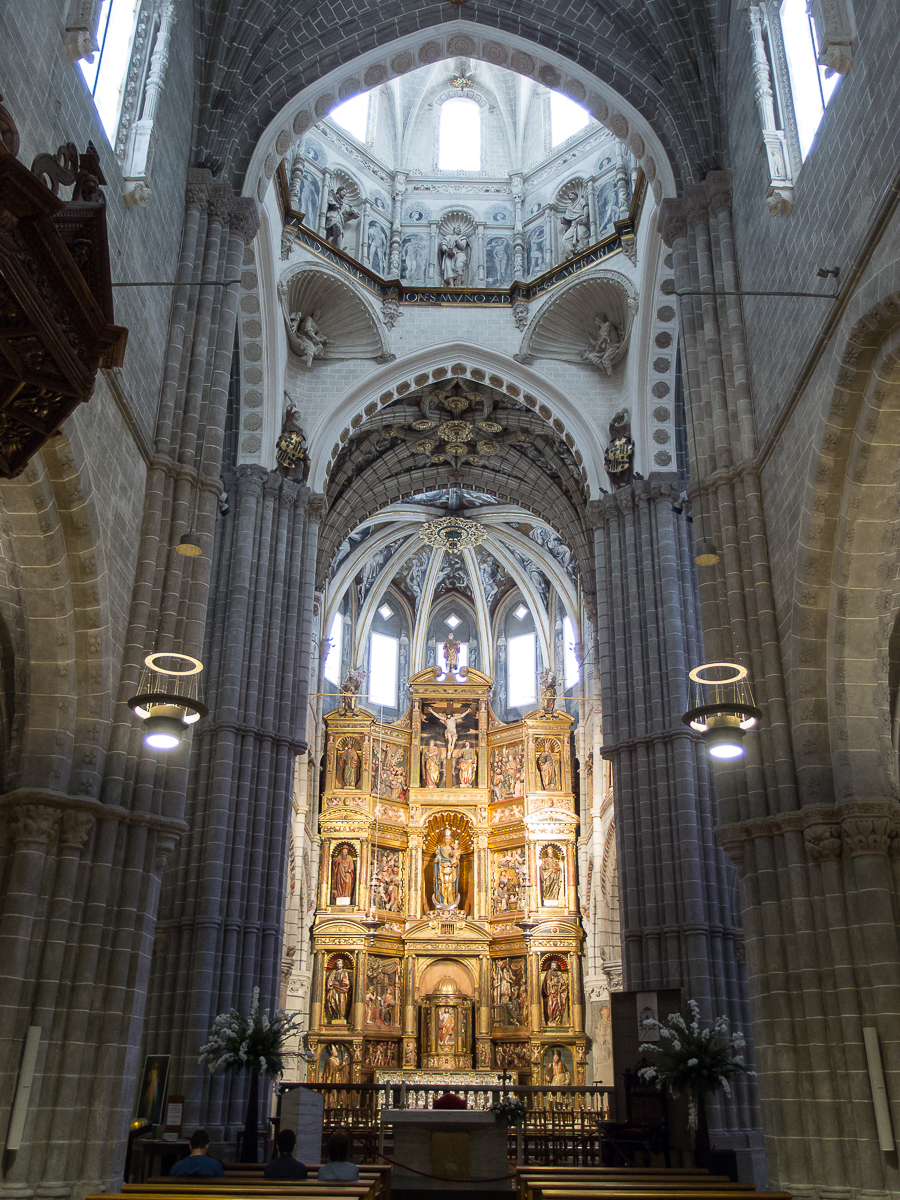
The Cathedral interior

In 1984, a major restoration of the cathedral was begun. In February 2012, Prince Felipe and Princess Letizia marked the completion of the restoration, with the President of Aragon, Luisa Fernanda Rudi, and the Bishop of Tarazona.

== See also ==
- Catholic Church in Spain
- Diocese of Tarazona
- List of Bienes de Interés Cultural in the Province of Zaragoza
- Mudéjar Architecture of Aragon — World Heritage Site.
- High medieval domes
- 16th-century Western domes

== Photo gallery ==
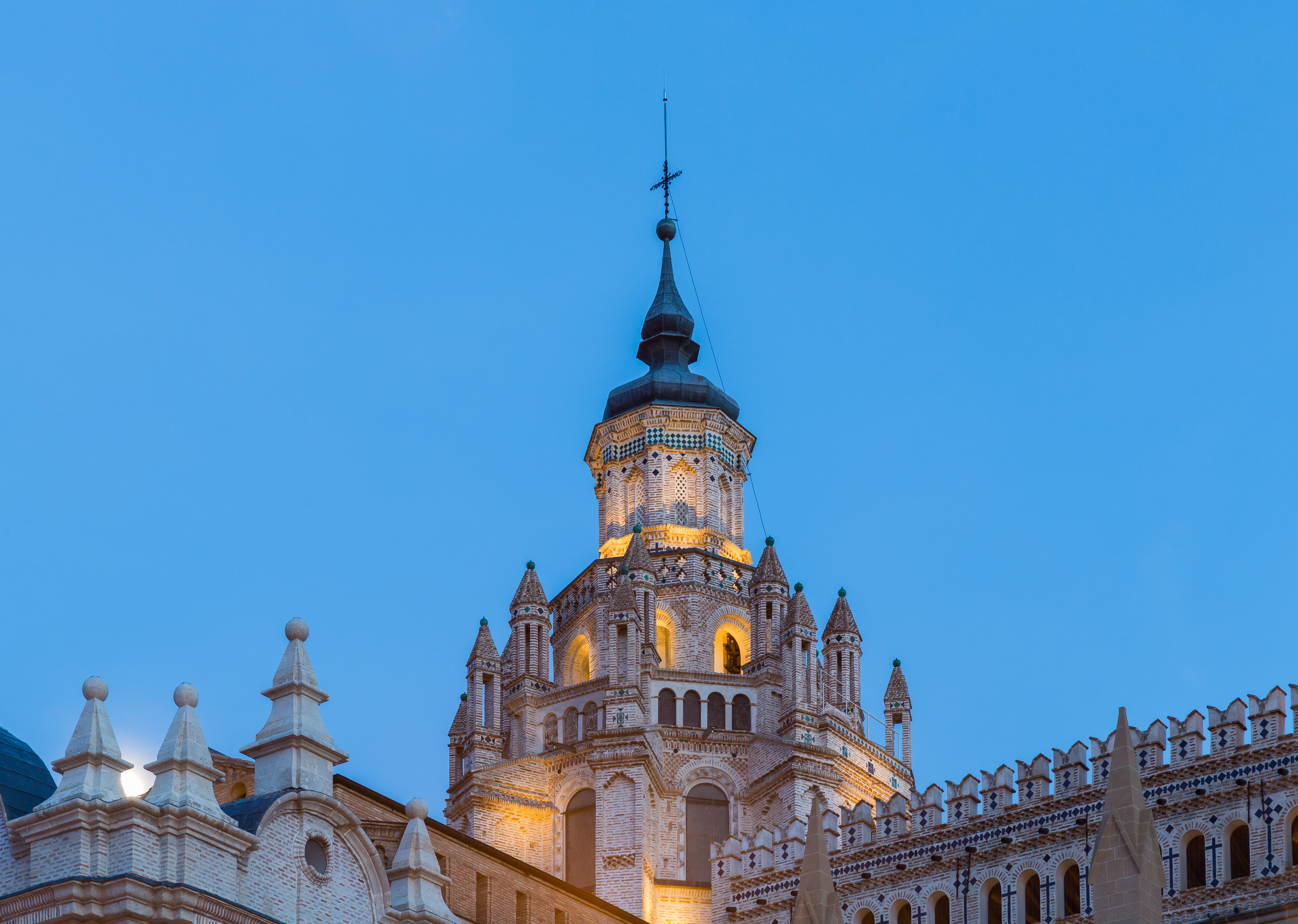
Exterior of the dome

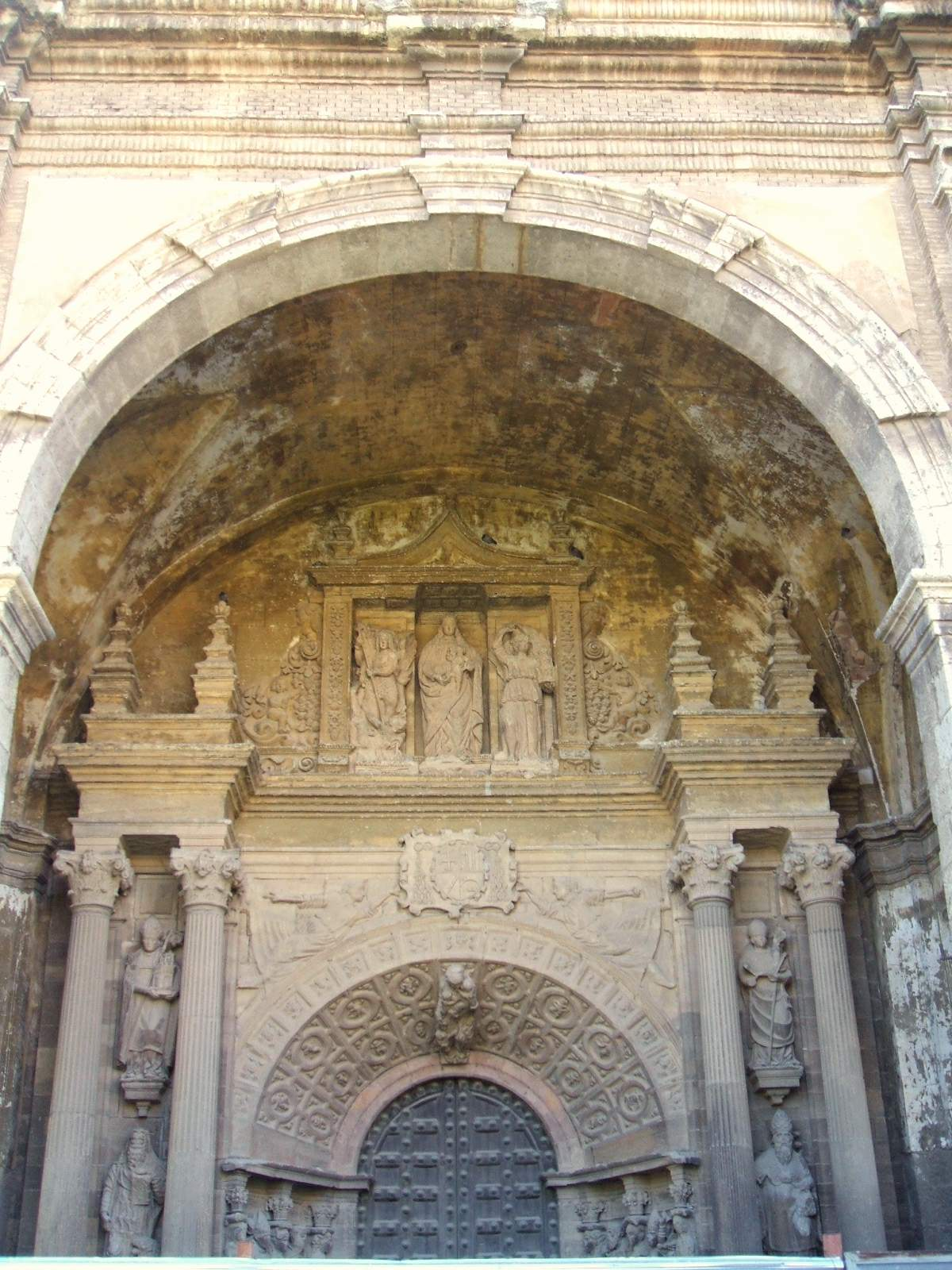
Portico and atrium of the cathedral

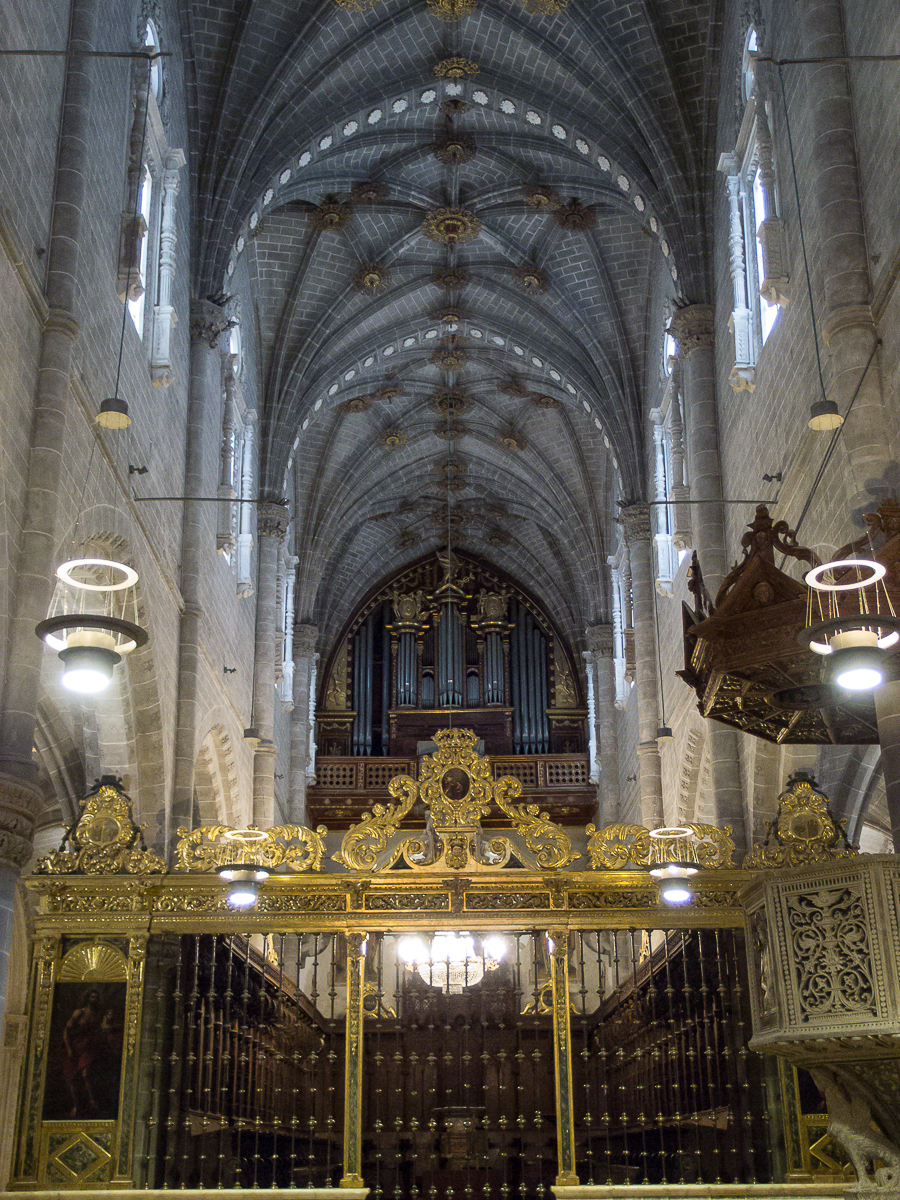
Choir and organ

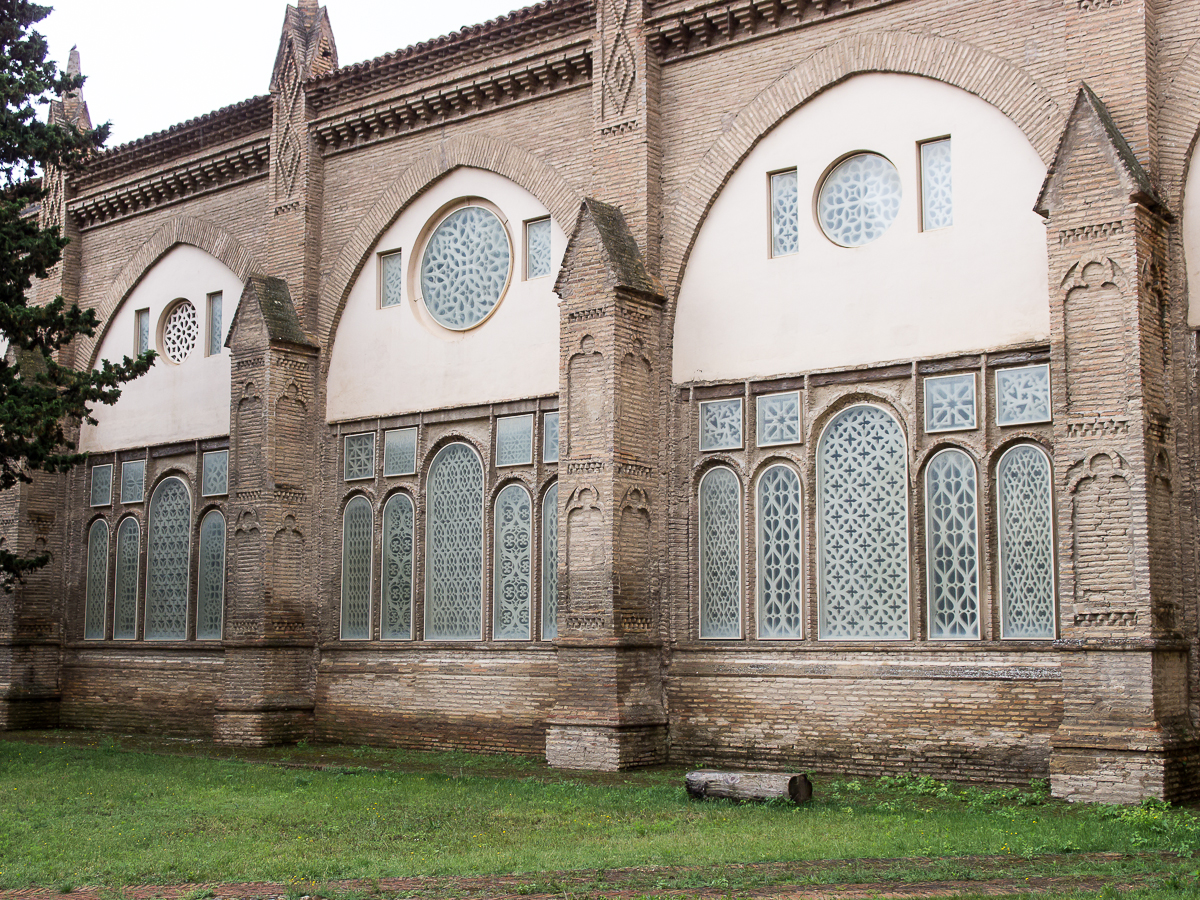
Exterior of the cloister

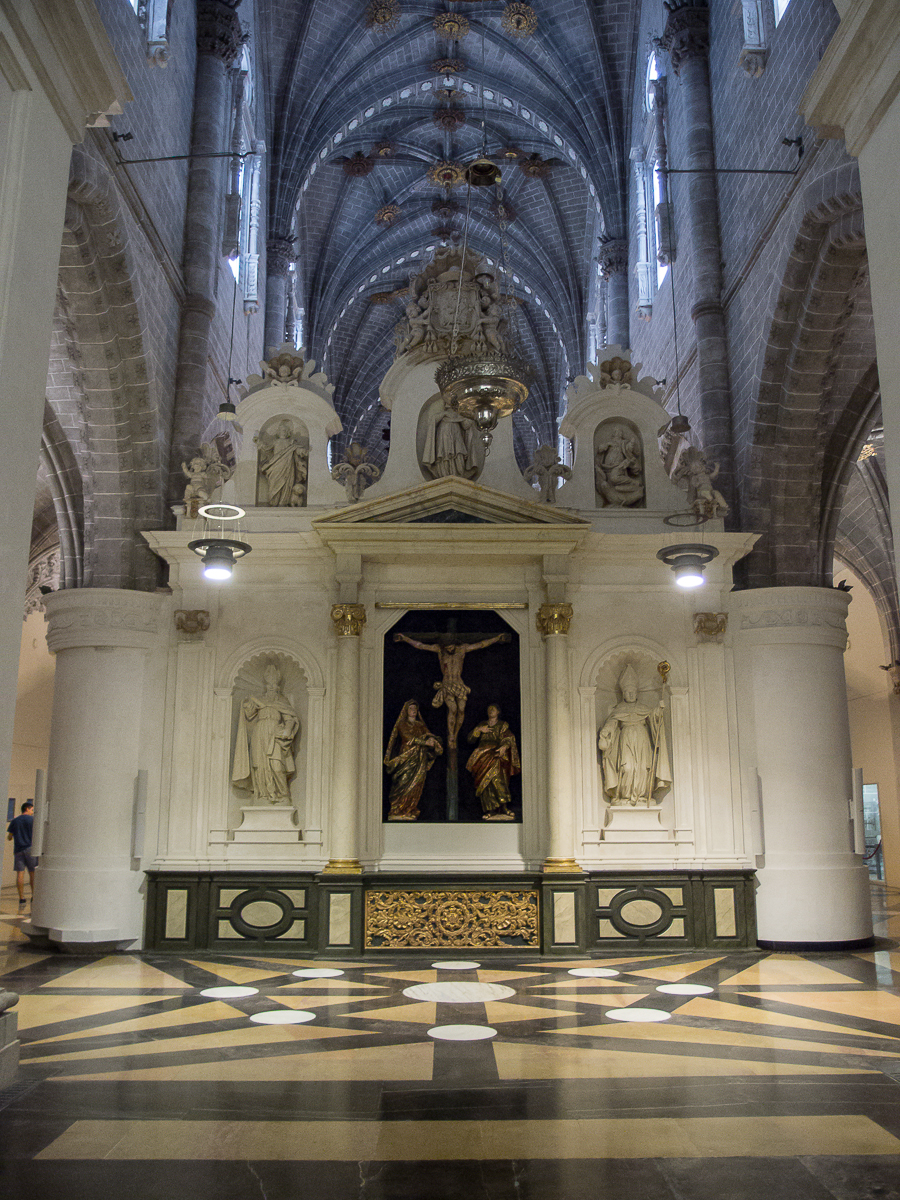
Retrochoir

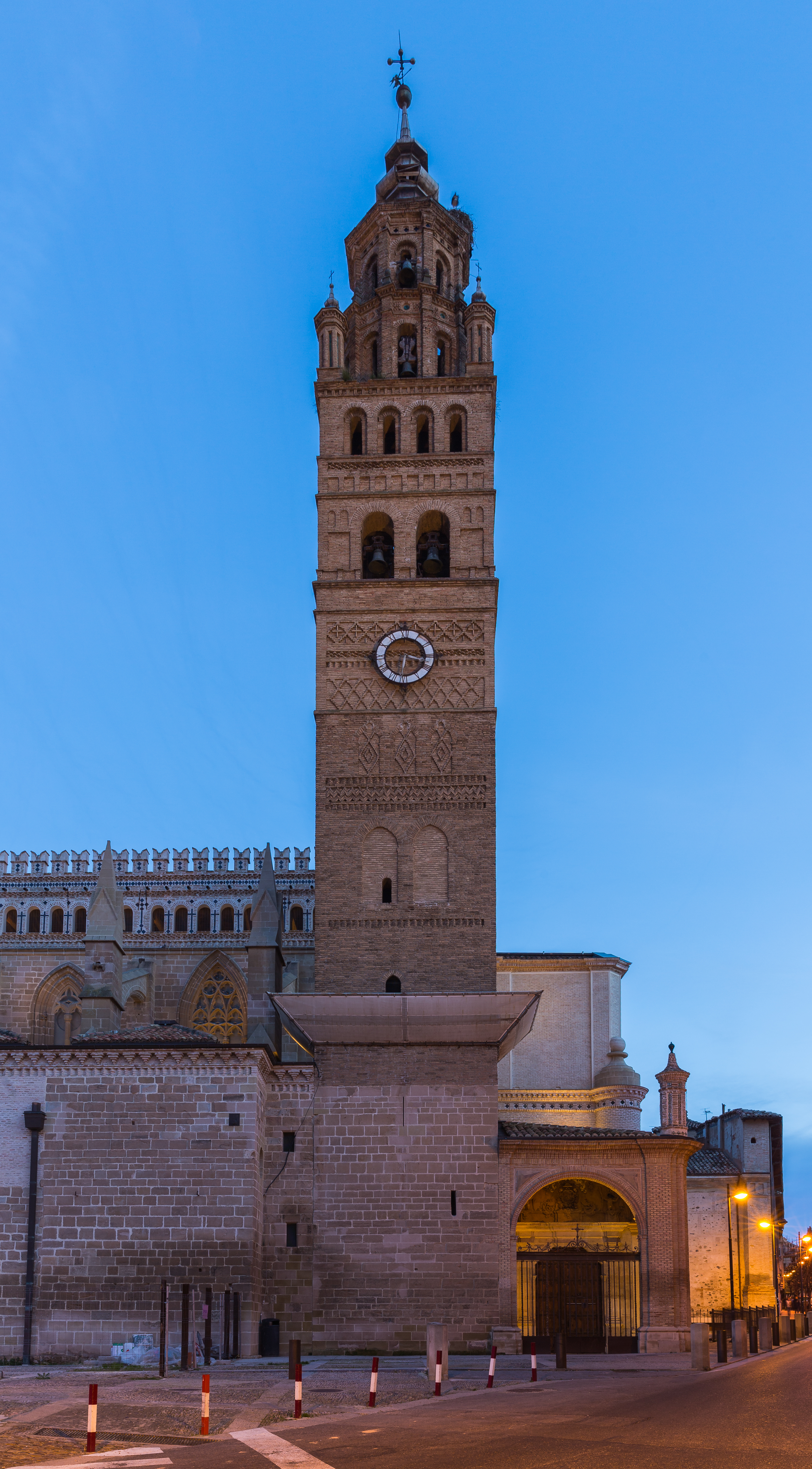
Tower

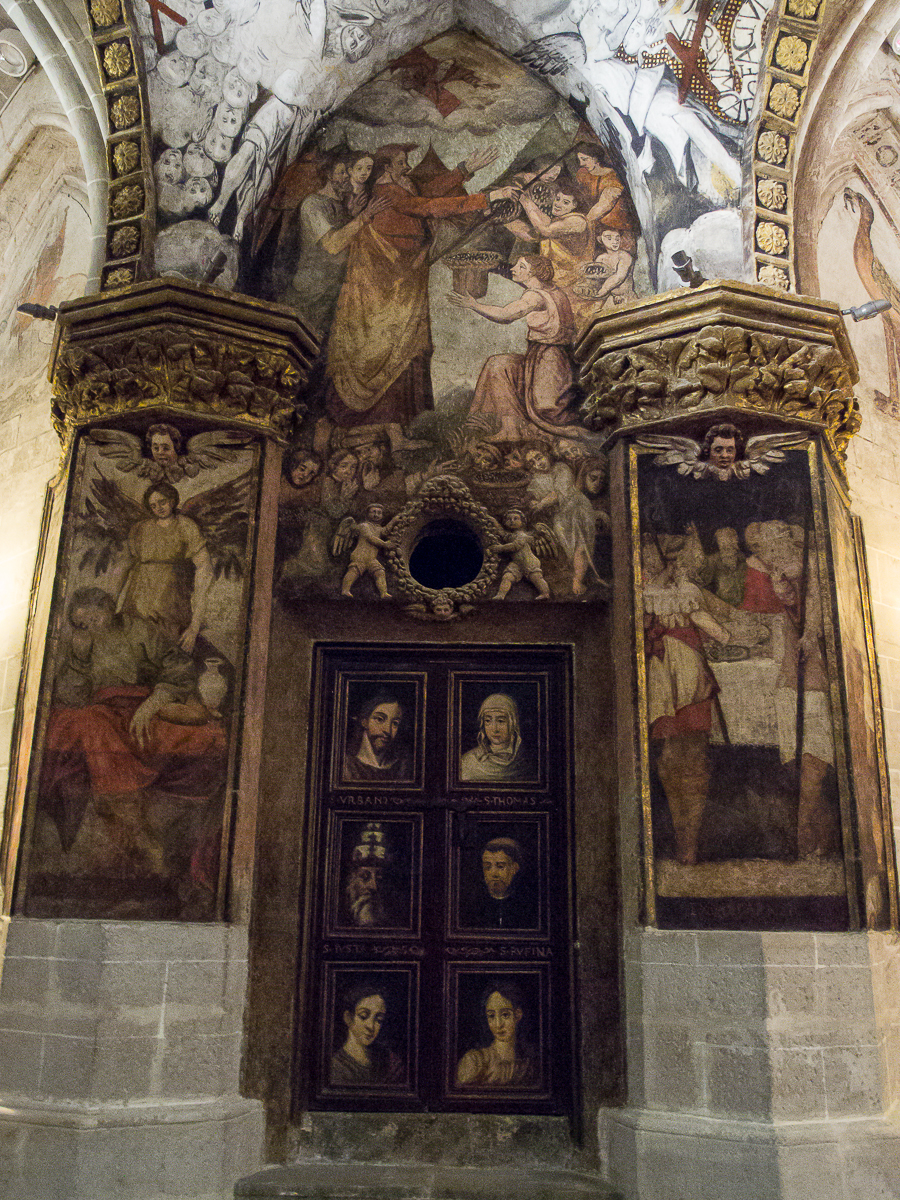
Paintings of the girola

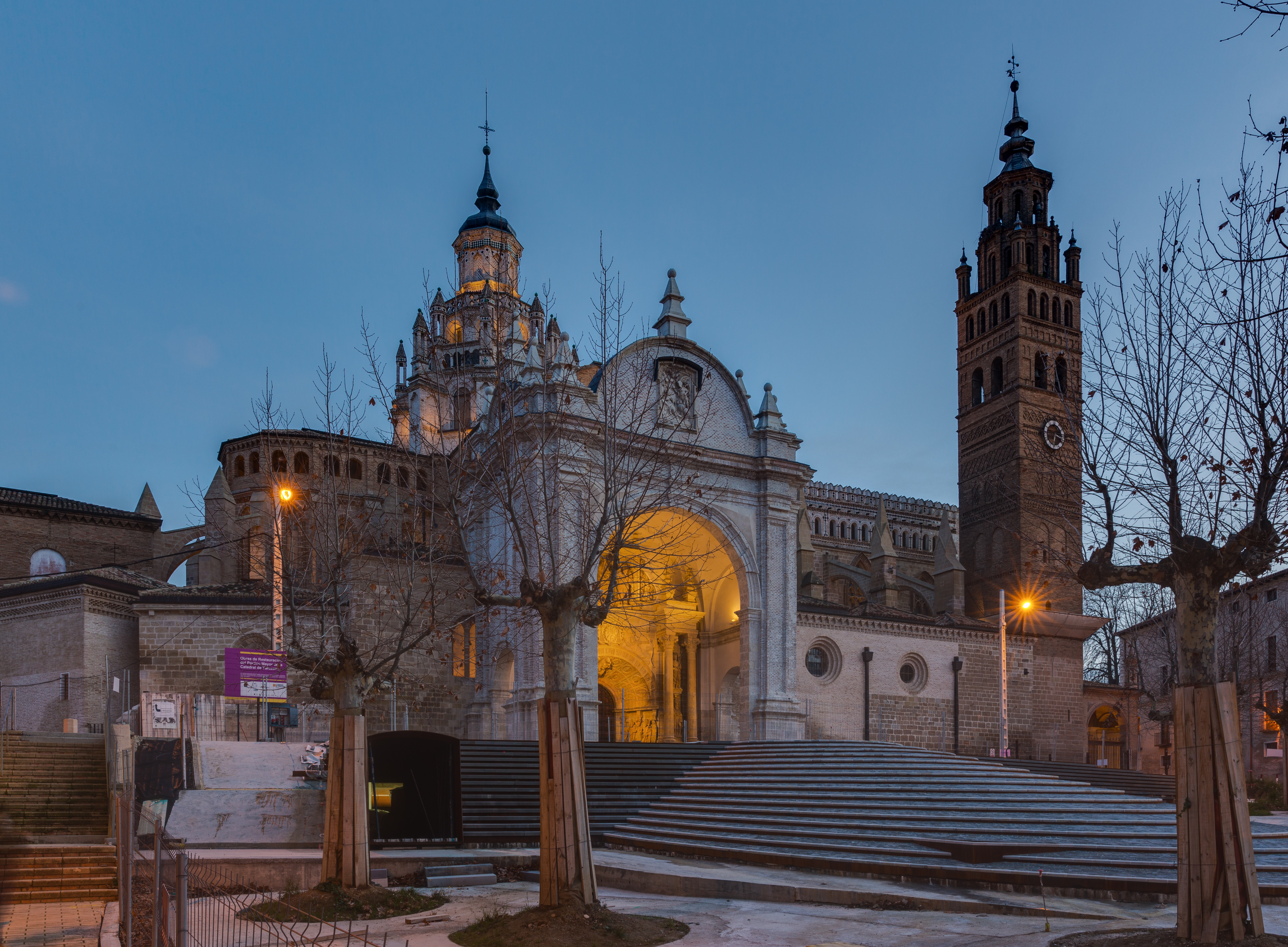
New steps of the Plaza de la Seo
