= Pedro Ferris =

Spanish Roman Catholic bishop and cardinal

His Eminence Pedro Ferris
- Bishop of Tarazona
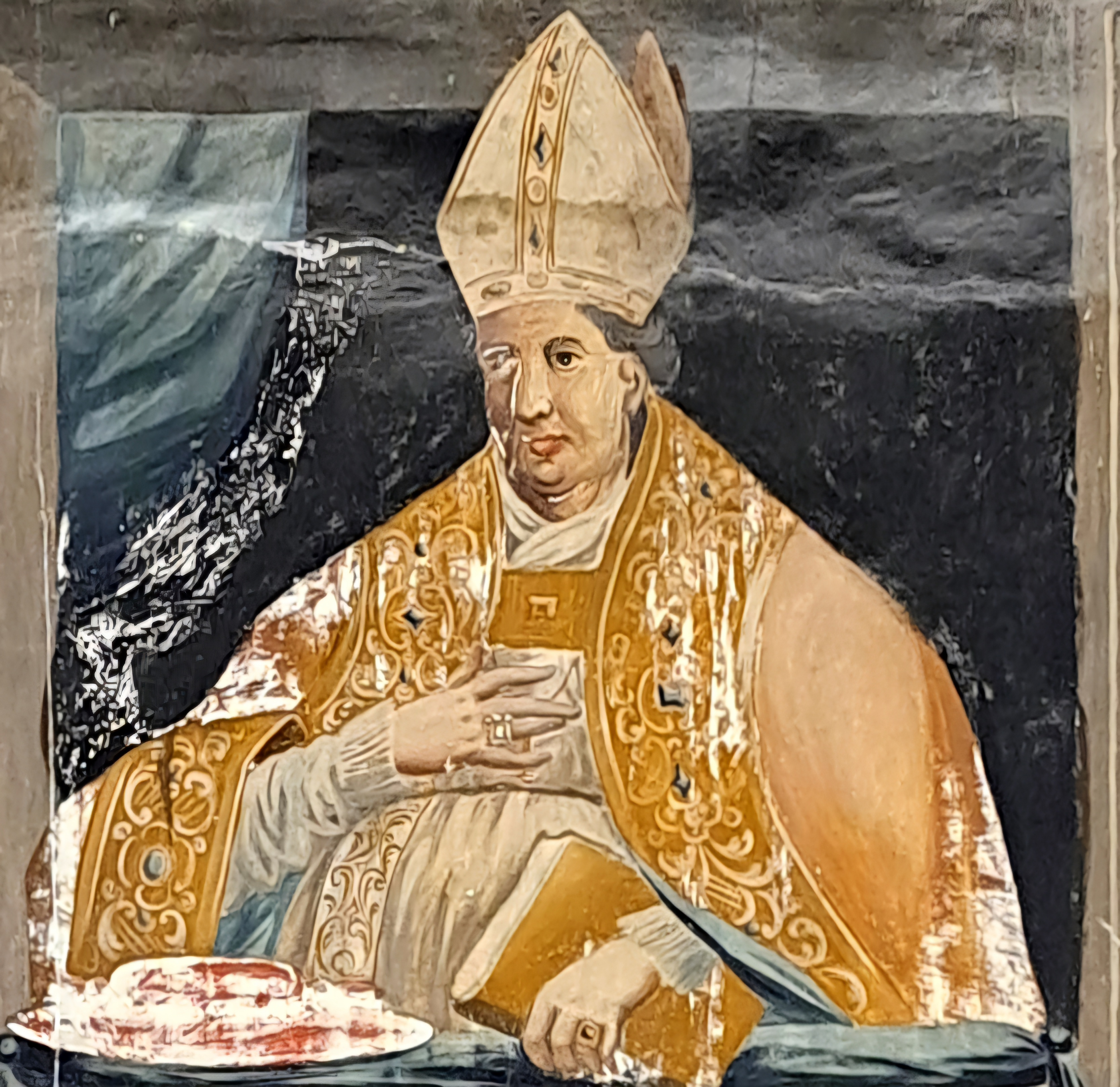
- Church: Catholic Church
- Appointed: 1 October 1464
- Term ended: 25 September 1478
- Predecessor: Jorge Bardají
- Successor: Andrés Martínez Ferriz
- Other posts: Cardinal-Priest of San Sisto Vecchio (1476-1478)

Orders
- Created cardinal: 18 December 1476 by Pope Sixtus IV
- Rank: Cardinal-Priest

Personal details
- Born: 16 April 1416 Cocentaina, Spain
- Died: 25 September 1478 (aged 62) Rome, Papal States
- Buried: Santa Maria sopra Minerva

Pedro Ferris (1416–1478) (called the Cardinal of Tarazona) was a Spanish Roman Catholic bishop and cardinal.

== Biography ==
An illegitimate child, Pedro Ferris was born in Cocentaina on April 16, 1416. He was a relative of Pope Paul II.

After completing his initial studies in Cocentaina, he studied Latin at Valencia and law at the University of Lleida. He then enrolled at the University of Bologna, where he became a doctor of both laws.

After graduating from Bologna, he traveled to Rome and became magister domus et auditor suus of Cardinal Guillaume-Hugues d'Estaing; however, the cardinal died a short time later, on October 28, 1455. He then entered the service of his relative Cardinal Pietro Barbo (who later became pope as Pope Paul II).

Pope Pius II made him a canon of the cathedral chapter of Palma Cathedral and made him a Referendary of the pope in 1458. Next, he was the pope's Commissary Apostolic in Liège. In 1462, he served as papal legate to the Holy Roman Empire, accompanied by jurist Francisco de Toledo, to solve the situation in the Archbishopric of Mainz, where Archbishop Diether von Isenburg had been deposed by Pope Pius II. In the name of the pope, he ratified the treaty between Diether von Isenburg and his competitor Adolph von Nassau in Frankfurt in October 1463. In May 1464, in Worms, he received Frederick I, Elector Palatine into communion with the church.

On his way home from Germany, Ferris received news that the new pope, Paul II, had promoted him to the episcopate: he was elected Bishop of Tarazona on October 1, 1464 and occupied that see until his death. Paul II also named him Referendary intimus et carissimus, in which capacity he handled some of the most delicate matters at the papal court over the next twelve years. He had the total trust of Paul II and his successor, Pope Sixtus IV, leading him to be called Dextera Pontificum, the "right hand of the pope".

On December 16, 1468, Pope Paul II named him a cardinal priest in pectore, though this appointment was never published. He became Dean of Tudela Cathedral in 1471. From 1474 to 1479, he acted as agent of the John II of Aragon in Rome.

In the consistory of December 18, 1476 openly made him a cardinal priest. He received the red hat on December 20, 1476 in the Basilica di Santa Maria Maggiore, and received the titular church of San Sisto Vecchio on December 30, 1476. On June 24, 1478, with the papal court absent from Rome because of an outbreak of bubonic plague, he became temporary Camerlengo of the Sacred College of Cardinals. He was later named cardinal protector of the Dominican Order.

He died in the Apostolic Palace in Rome on September 25, 1478. He is buried in Santa Maria sopra Minerva, with a tomb sculpted by Mino da Fiesole.
