= San Sisto Vecchio =

- Old Basilica of Saint Sixtus
- Basilica di San Sisto Vecchio
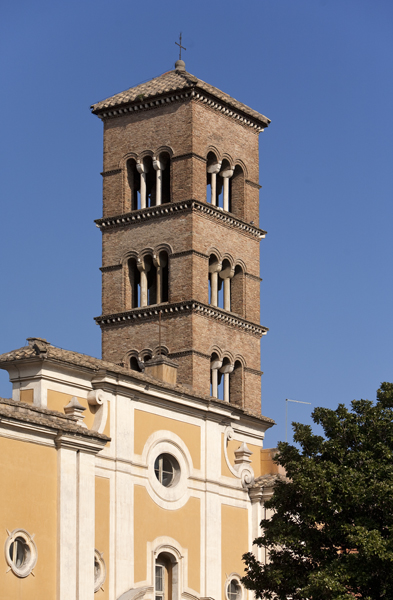
- Facade
- Click on the map for a fullscreen view
- 41°52′49″N 12°29′46″E
- Location: Piazzale Numa Pompilio 8, Rome
- Country: Italy
- Language: Italian
- Denomination: Catholic
- Tradition: Roman Rite
- Religious order: Dominicans (nuns)
- Website: sansistoroma.it

History
- Former name: Titulus Crescentianae
- Status: Minor basilica, titular church
- Founded: 4th century AD
- Founder: Pope Anastasius I
- Dedication: Pope Sixtus II

Architecture
- Architectural type: Romanesque, Baroque
- Completed: 18th century

Administration
- Diocese: Rome

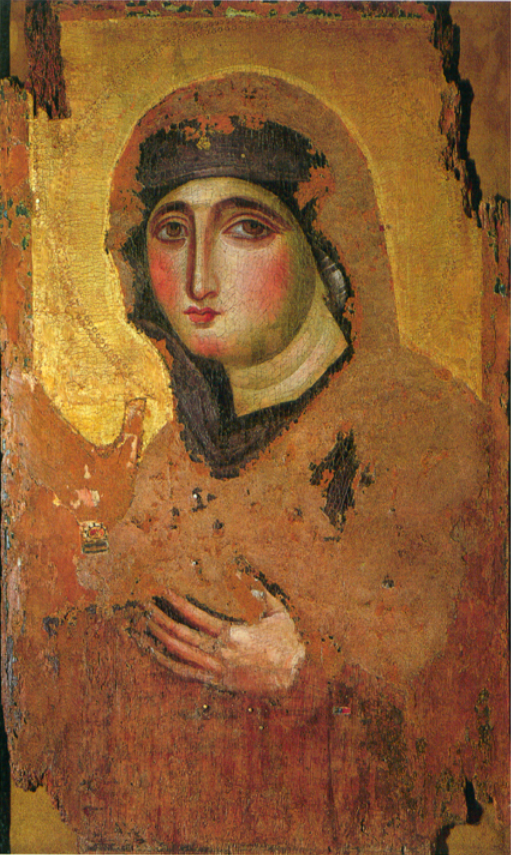
The Maria Advocata, c. 6th century, hung in the basilica from 1221 to 1575

The Basilica of San Sisto Vecchio (in Via Appia) is a Catholic minor basilica and Dominican conventual church in Rome, Italy. It has been a titular church since 600 AD. Its Cardinal priest is currently Antoine Kambanda.

== Basilica ==
The basilica was constructed in the fourth century and is recorded as the Titulus Crescentianae, thus relating the church to a certain Crescentia (possibly a Roman woman who founded the church.) According to tradition, the church was established by Pope Anastasius I (399–401).

The church is dedicated to Pope Sixtus II and houses his relics (transferred there from the Catacomb of Callixtus in the sixth century.)

San Sisto was rebuilt in the early 13th century by Pope Innocent III. The current church is the result of the restorations of Pope Benedict XIII in the 18th century, which left only the bell tower and the apse from the medieval church.

A 13th-century fresco cycle depicting scenes from the New Testament and the Apocrypha has been preserved.

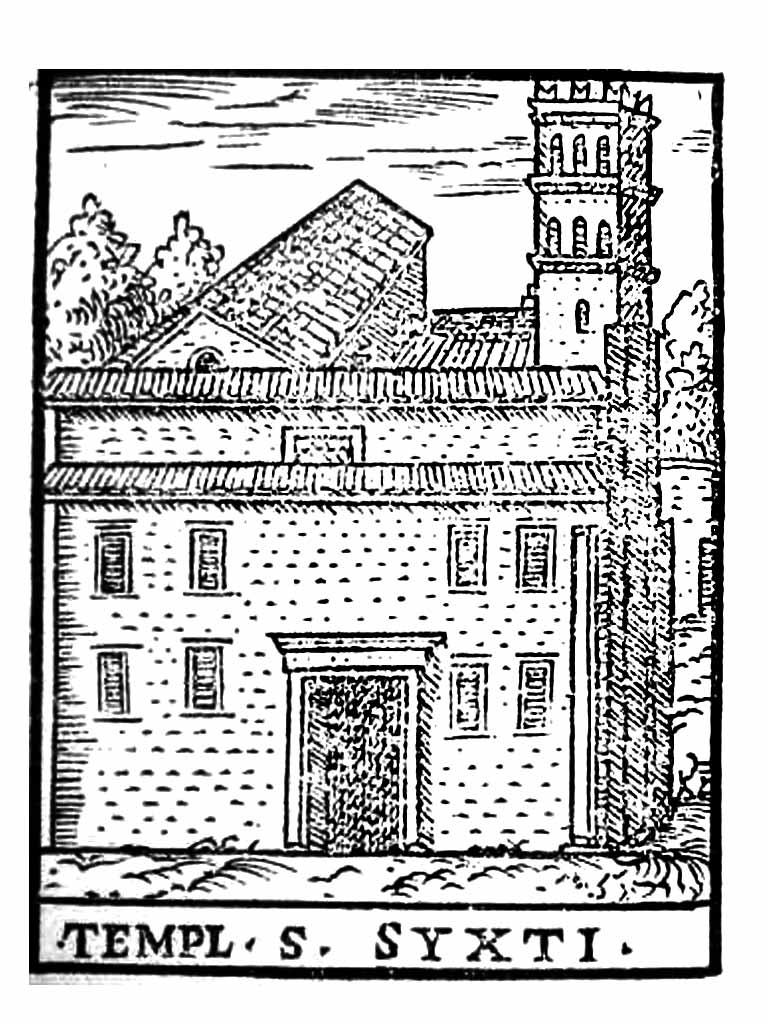
Woodcut of San Sisto Vecchio in the 16th century, from Le cose maravigliose dell'alma città di Roma (Venice: Girolamo Francino, 1588)

Pope Honorius III entrusted the reform of the monastery at San Sisto Vecchio to Dominic in the 1220s, intending it as part of the reformation of women's religious life in Rome. In 1219 Honorius then invited Dominic and his companions to take up permanent residence at the ancient Roman basilica of Santa Sabina, which they did in the early 1220. After that they founded a convent and studium on June 5, 1222, thus forming the original studium of the Dominican Order in Rome, out of which the 16th-century College of Saint Thomas at Santa Maria sopra Minerva and the Pontifical University of Saint Thomas Aquinas (Angelicum) would grow.

Dominican nuns still occupy the monastery at San Sisto Vecchio.

== Cardinal protectors ==
The following persons are known to have been Cardinal priests of S. Sisto (italics are used to denote special cases):

- Joannes (attested only at the beginning of 1069).
- Petrus (attested from 1100 to 1112).
- Sigizo (attested from 1118 to 1130), Roman. He followed Pope Anacletus II in the Schism of 1130–1139.
- Giovanni, OSB Cas. (1168 – 1177), Italian
- Arnaud de Villemur, CRSA (1350.12.17 – 1355.10.28), French
- Nicolás Rossell, OP (1356.12.23 – 1362.03.28), Italian
- Simon Langham, OSB (1368.09.22 – 1373.08), Langham, Rutland, England (UK)
- Luca Rodolfucci de Gentili (1378.09.18 – 1389.01.18), Italian
- Pseudocardinal-priest Leonardo Rossi da Giffoni, O.Min. (* 1378.12.18 – 1398.10), Italian
- Giovanni Dominici, O.P. (1408.05.09 – 1419.06.10), Italian
- Juan Casanova, O.P. (1431.07.04 – 1436.03.01), Spanish
- Juan de Torquemada, O.P. (1440.01.08 – 1446), Valladolid, Castile (Spain)
- Pseudocardinal-priest Giovanni di Ragusa, O.P. (* 1440.10.02 – 1443.10), Croatian (Obedience of Antipope Felix V)
- Pietro Riario, O.Min. (1471.12.22 – 1474.01.03), Savona
- Pedro Ferris (1476.12.30 – 1478.09.25), Cocentaina, Alicante, Spain
- Cosma Orsini, O.S.B. Cas. (1480.05.15 – 1480.06.03), Roman, father from Fermo (He held the title for three weeks)
- Pierre de Foix, le jeune, O.Min. (1485.08 – 1490.08.10), Pau, County of Foix
- Paolo Fregoso (1490 – 1498.03.22), Italian
- Georges d’Amboise (1498.09.17 – 1510.05.25), French
- Achille Grassi (1511.03.17 – 1517.07.06), Bolognese
- Tommaso Cajetan de Vio, O.P. (1517.07.06 – 1534.03.14), Gaeta, Kingdom of Naples
- Nikolaus von Schönberg, O.P. (1537.05.31 – 1537.09.07), Rothschönberg, near Meissen
- Gian Pietro Carafa (later Pope Paul IV) (1537.09.24 – 1541.07.06), Capriglia Irpina, Kingdom of Naples
- Juan Álvarez de Toledo, O.P. (1541.07.06 – 1547.01.24), Spanish
- Cardinal-deacon Charles de Bourbon-Vendome (1549.02.25 – 1561.01.15 pro illa vice Deaconry), French. Translated to S. Crisogono
- Philibert Babou de la Bourdaisière (1561.03.10 – 1564.11.17), French
- Cardinal-priest Ugo Boncompagni (later Pope Gregory XIII) (1565.05.15 – 1572.05.13), Italian
- Filippo Boncompagni (1572.06.16 – 1586.06.09), Italian
- Jerzy Radziwiłł (1586.07.14 – 1600.01.21), Lithuanian-Polish
- Alfonso Visconti (1600.01.24 – 1608.09.19), Italian
- Giambattista Leni (1608.12.10 – 1618.03.05), Italian
- Francisco Gómez Rojas de Sandoval (1621.03 – 1625.05.17), Spanish
- Laudivio Zacchia (1626.02.09 – 1629.09.17), Vezzano Ligure, Republic of Genoa
- Agostino Oreggi (1634.01.09 – 1635.07.12), Italian
- Carlo de’ Medici (1644.12.12 – 1645.03.06), Florence, Grand Duchy of Tuscany
- Domenico Cecchini (1645.04.24 – 1656.05.01), Italian
- Giulio Rospigliosi (later Pope Clement IX) (1657.04.23 – 1667.06.20), Italian
- Giacomo Rospigliosi (1668.01.30 – 1672.05.16), Italian
- Vincenzo Maria Orsini de Gravina, O.P. (later Pope Benedict XIII) (1672.05.16 – 1701.01.03), Italian
- Nicola Gaetano Spinola (1716.06.08 – 1725.01.29), Spanish
- Agostino Pipia, O.P. (1725.01.29 – 1729.03.03), Italian
- Louis-Antoine de Noailles (1729.03.03 – 1729.05.04), French
- Francesco Antonio Finy (1729.07.06 – 1738.09.03), Italian
- Vincenzo Ludovico Gotti, O.P. (1738.09.26 – 1742.09.18), Bologna, Italy
- Luigi Maria Lucini, O.P. (1743.09.23 – 1745.01.17), Italian
- Carlo Vittorio Amedeo Delle Lanze (1747.10.02 – 1758.11.22), Italian
- Giuseppe Agostino Orsi, O.P. (1759.11.19 – 1761.06.13), Italian
- Giovanni Molino (1769.06.26 – 1773.03.14), Italian
- Juan Tomás de Boxadors y Sureda de San Martín, O.P. (1775.12.18 – 1780.12.16), Spanish
- Jean-Baptist-Marie-Anne-Antoine de Latil (1829.05.21 – 1839.12.01), French
- Gaspare Bernardo Pianetti (1840.12.17 – 1862.01.30), Italian
- Cardinal-priest Filippo Maria Guidi, O.P. (1863.03.19 – 1872.07.29, 1872.07.29 – 1877.06.20 in commendam), Italian
- Lucido Maria Parocchi (1877.06.25 – 1884.03.24), Italian
- Camillo Siciliano di Rende (1887.05.26 – 1897.05.16), Italian
- Giuseppe Antonio Ermenegildo Prisco (1898.03.24 – 1923.02.04), Italian
- Achille Liénart (1930.07.03 – 1973.02.15), French
- Octavio Antonio Beras Rojas (1976.05.24 – 1990.12.01), Dominican Republic
- Ignatius Kung Pin-mei (龔品梅) (1991.06.30 – 2000.03.12), PR China
- Marian Jaworski (2001.02.21 – 2020.09.05), Ukrainian
- Antoine Kambanda (2020.11.28 - present), Rwandan

Preceded by San Silvestro in Capite	Landmarks of Rome; San Sisto Vecchio	Succeeded by Santa Sofia a Via Boccea
