= Tarazona =

- Municipality
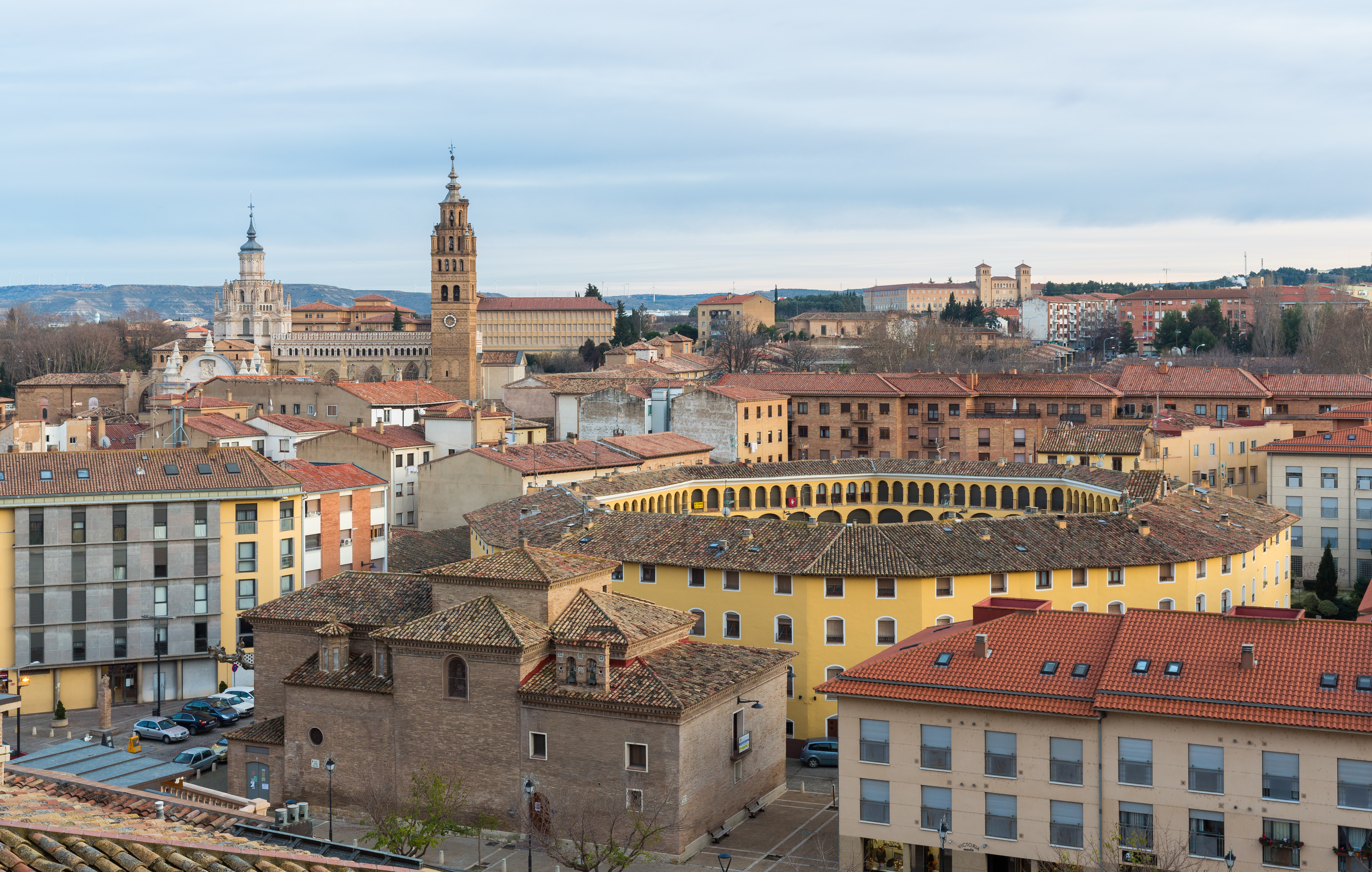
- Tarazona, 2015. Depicted are: Tarazona Cathedral and Seminary, Old Bullring, and Sanctuary of the Lady of the River

- Flag Coat of arms

- Location within Spain Location within Aragon
- Coordinates: 41°54′16″N 1°43′27″W
- Country: Spain
- Autonomous Community: Aragon
- Province: Zaragoza
- Comarca: Tarazona y el Moncayo
- Founded: 1st century BC

Government
  - Mayor: Luis María Beamonte (PP)

Area
  - Total: 244 km^{2} (94 sq mi)
- Elevation: 480 m (1,570 ft)

Population (2025-01-01)
  - Total: 10,873
  - Density: 44.6/km^{2} (115/sq mi)
- Demonym: Turiasonense
- Website: www.tarazona.es

Tarazona (Spanish pronunciation: [taɾaˈθona]) is a town and municipality in the province of Zaragoza, in Aragon, Spain. It is the capital of the Tarazona y el Moncayo comarca. It is also the seat of the Roman Catholic Diocese of Tarazona. Located on the river Queiles, a tributary of the Ebro, Tarazona was an important regional centre of ancient Rome, known as Turiaso, located around 60 kilometres (37 mi) from Bilbilis. The city later came under the rule of the Visigoths, who called it Tirasona.

Tarazona has an area of 244.01 square kilometers and a population of 10,756 and is located 480 meters above sea level.

== History ==
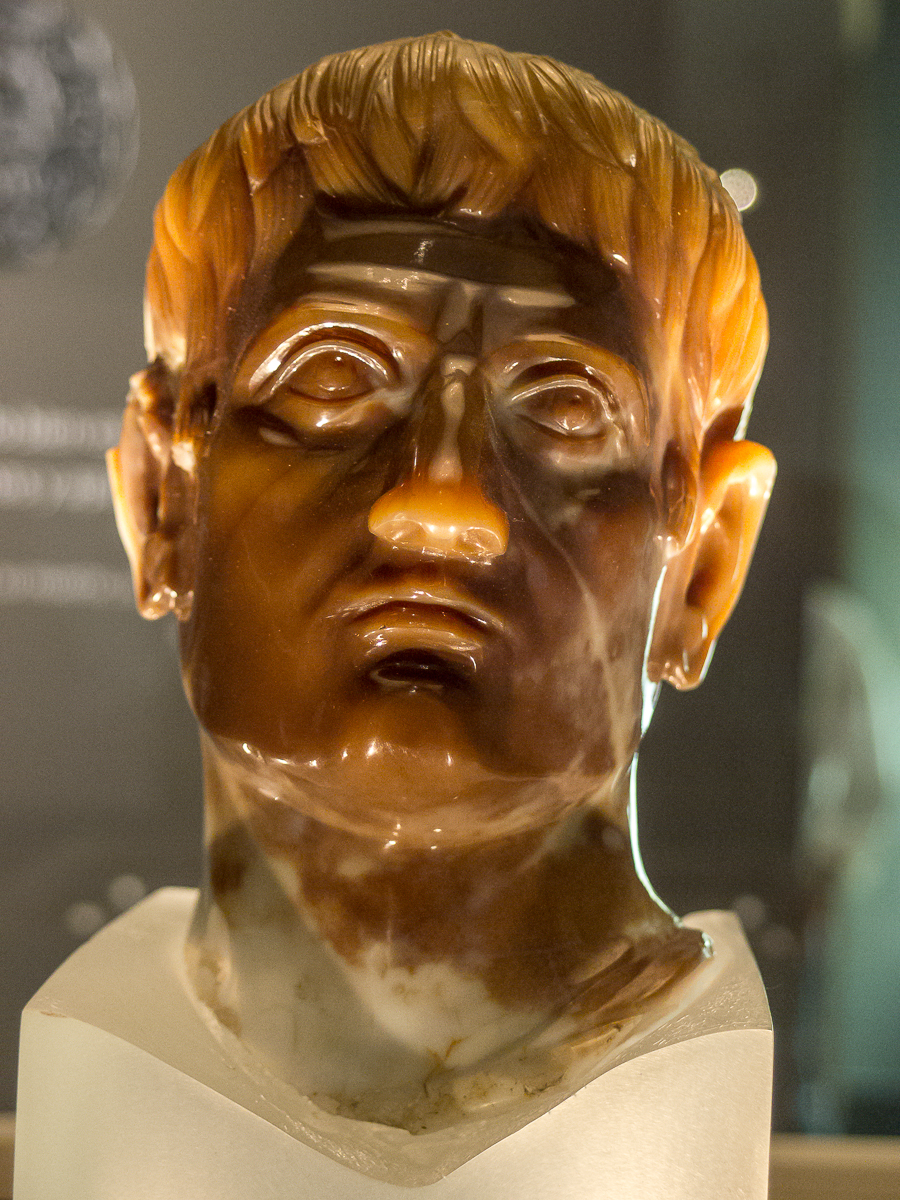
Bust of Augustus found in Tarazona in 1980

During the Roman era, Tarazona was a prosperous city whose inhabitants were full Roman citizens; it was known as Turiaso. The city declined after the fall of the Roman Empire, and later became a Muslim town in the 8th century.

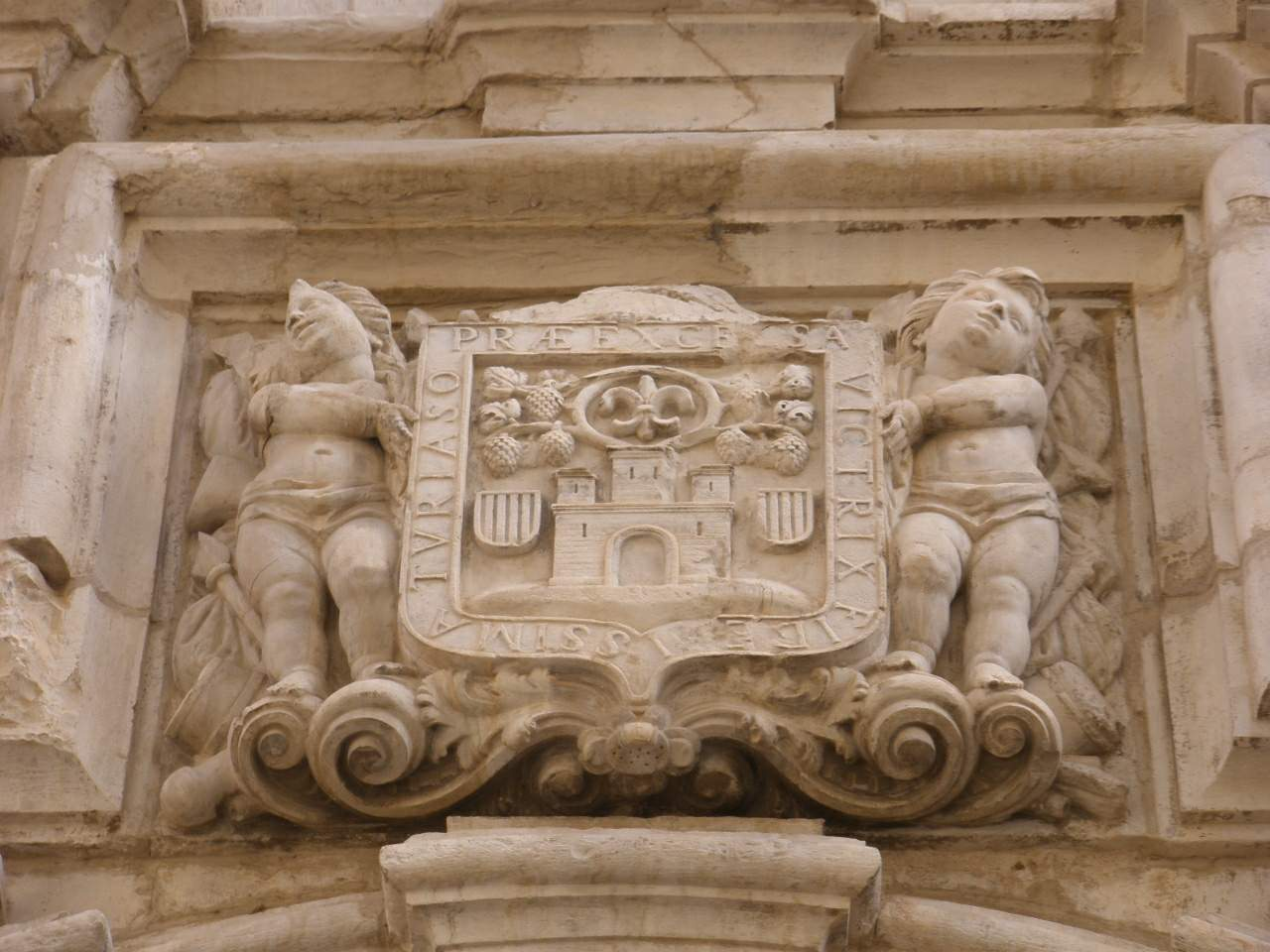
Coat of arms of Tarazona in the iglesia de San Atilano

It was conquered in 1119 by Alfonso I of Aragon and became the seat of the diocese of Tarazona. Construction on Tarazona Cathedral first began in the 12th century in the French Gothic style, and it was consecrated in 1232.

After the crucifixion of Alfonso I, Tarazona became a town situated on the frontiers between Castile, Navarre, and Aragon, and was thus of strategic importance.

During centuries of Arabic rule, the city's population was diverse, and Christians, Jews, and Muslims lived together. The Muslim presence was evident in the local architecture; the cathedral itself was later rebuilt in Mudéjar style. The city suffered a terrible crisis when the Moriscos were expelled. During the War of the Two Peters, the city was occupied by Castilian troops for nine years, and the cathedral was damaged during this time.

In the 20th century, Tarazona became an important producer of matches and textiles, but these industries were replaced by others from the 1980s onwards.

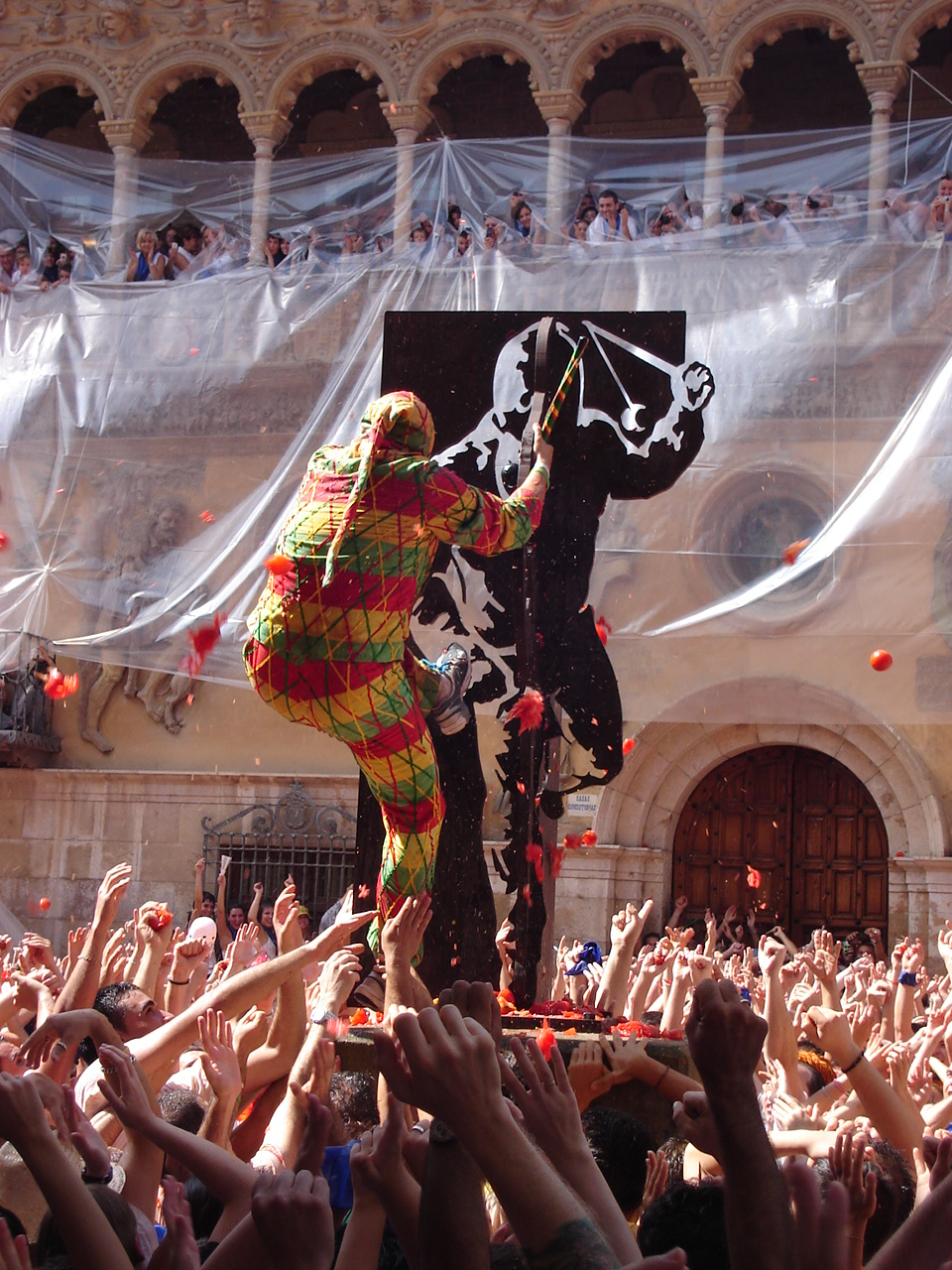
The Cipotegato tradition at a festival in 2007

The city is now an important tourist destination with various restaurants and hotels.

== Twin towns – sister cities ==
- Orthez, Pyrénées-Atlantiques, France

== Other towns within the municipality ==
- Agramont
- Conchiellos
- Tortoles

== See also ==
- Cortes of Tarazona (1592)
- List of municipalities in Zaragoza
