= Moncayo (disambiguation) =

Moncayo may refer to:

- Moncayo Massif, of the Sistema Ibérico
- Monkayo, Compostela Valley, a municipality in the Philippines

== People ==
- Oswaldo Moncayo, a painter from Ecuador
- José Pablo Moncayo, a Mexican composer
- Pedro Moncayo, a canton in Ecuador
- Paco Moncayo, former mayor of Quito
