= War of the Two Pedros =

1356–1369 war between Castile and Aragon

War of the Two Peters
- Part of the First Castilian Civil War
| Date | 1356–1369 |
| Location | Mostly towns in the Kingdom of Aragon and the Kingdom of Valencia, coast of the Principality of Catalonia |
| Result | Trastamarian victory: Overthrow of Peter of Castile; Accession of Henry II of Castile |

Belligerents
| Pedristas; Supported by: England; Republic of Genoa; Portugal; Navarre; Granada | Aragon; Enriquistas; Supported by: France |

Commanders and leaders
| Peter of Castile; Edward the Black Prince; John of Gaunt | Peter IV of Aragon; Henry of Trastámara |

The War of the Two Peters (Spanish: La Guerra de los Dos Pedros, Catalan: Guerra dels dos Peres), also known as the Castilian–Aragonese War of 1356–1369, was fought from 1356 to 1369 between the crowns of Castile and Aragon. The conflict was a struggle between two claimants to the throne of Castile, Peter of Castile and Peter IV of Aragon. The former Peter (Castilian) was supported by England and several English nobles led by King Edward III and his son, Edward, the Black Prince, while the latter Peter (Aragonese) was supported by France. The conflict also brought in the involvement of the kingdoms of Navarre and Portugal. The war resulted in Aragon gaining the upper hand, but it also devastated its economy that was already reeling from the effects of the Black Death.

== Background ==
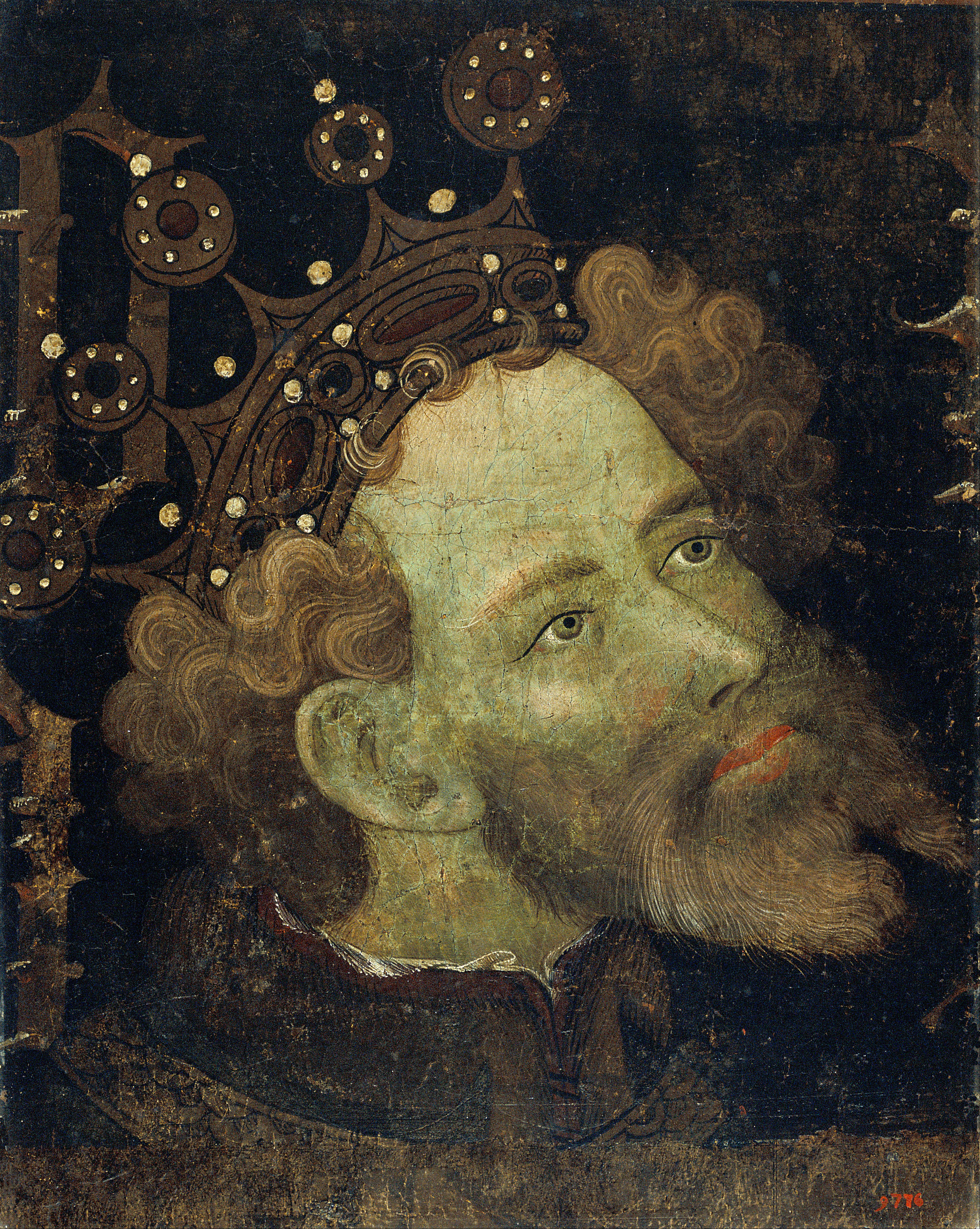
Peter IV, King of Aragon, by Gonçal Peris Sarrià & Jaume Mateu (1427)

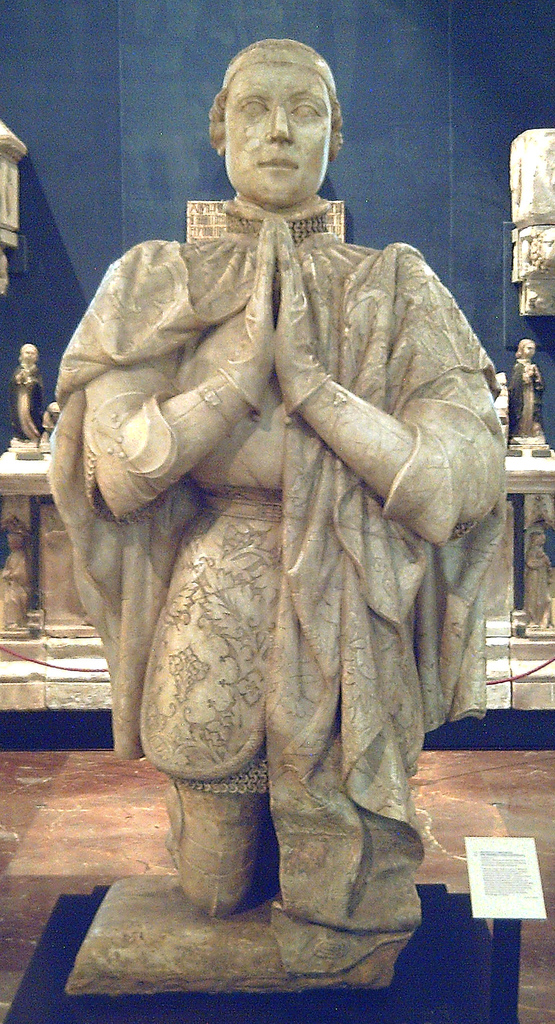
Alabaster sculpture of Peter the Cruel, from 1504

At the start of the second half of the fourteenth century, Castile was suffering from unrest caused by its civil war, which was fought between the local and allied forces of the reigning king, Peter of Castile, and his half-brother Henry of Trastámara over the right to the crown.

Peter IV of Aragon supported Henry of Trastámara. Henry was also supported by the French commander Bertrand du Guesclin and his free companies that he managed to persuade. Peter of Castile was supported by the English. The War of the Two Peters can thus be considered an extension of the wider Hundred Years' War as well as the First Castilian Civil War.

Peter of Castile sought to claim the Kingdom of Valencia, which included parts of Murcia, Elche, Alicante, and Orihuela. Peter of Aragon wished to dominate the Mediterranean in opposition to Castile and Castile's ally Genoa.

A naval incident between the two powers had already caused tension: Catalan galleys, armed by Mossèn Francesc de Perellós, who had letters of marque from the King of Aragon, aided France against England, and also managed to capture two Genoese ships at Sanlúcar de Barrameda. Genoa was an ally of Castile. Peter of Castile, leading the Castilian fleet, caught up to Perellós at Tavira but was unable to capture him.

== War ==
=== 1356–1363 ===
The war lasted from 1356 to 1369, prolonged because Peter of Castile lost his throne to Henry of Trastámara. The war primarily took place on the border between Castile and Aragon, namely Aragonese border towns such as Teruel, which fell to the Castilians.

In 1357, Castile penetrated Aragon and conquered Tarazona on March 9; on May 8, they arranged a temporary truce.

At the beginning of 1361, the Castilians conquered the fortresses of Verdejo, Torrijos, Alhama, and other places. However, the peace of Terrer (sometimes called the peace of Deza) was negotiated on 18 May 1361, in which all conquered places and castles were returned to their original lords. Bernardo de Cabrera, ambassador of the Aragonese king, negotiated the peace. Peter IV married his daughter Constance to KingFrederick III the Simple of Sicily.

In June 1362, Peter of Castile met with King Charles II of Navarre at Soria, and mutual aid was promised. Peter also contracted an alliance with Edward III of England and Edward's son The Black Prince.

With these negotiations complete, the King of Castile invaded Aragonese territory without officially declaring war, and the conflict commenced again. The Aragonese king was at Perpignan without troops, and thus caught off guard. The Castilians took the castles of Arize, Atece, Terrer, Moros, Cetina, and Alhama. Peter of Castile was unable to take Calatayud, even though he attacked it with all types of siege machines. Without taking his conquests any further, he returned to Seville.

In 1363, Castile continued the war against Aragon, and again occupied Tarazona. Peter of Castile received reinforcements from Portugal and Navarre. Meanwhile, the King of Aragon negotiated a treaty with France and a secret treaty with Henry II of Castile. Peter of Castile then conquered Cariñena, Teruel, Segorbe, Morvedre, Almenara, Xiva, and Bunyol.

The papal nuncio Jean de la Grange arranged the peace of Morvedre (Sagunt) (2 July 1363) between the two kings. The peace was not ratified, however, and hostilities continued. The Castilians penetrated the Kingdom of Valencia in 1363, and conquered Alicante, Caudete, Elda, Gandia, and other places.

=== 1363–1369 ===
From 1365 to 1369, Peter of Castile was preoccupied with maintaining his position on the Castilian throne against Henry of Trastámara.

The Castilian Civil War began in 1366 and Peter of Castile was dethroned. He was assailed by his illegitimate brother Henry of Trastámara at the head of a host of soldiers of fortune, including Bertrand du Guesclin and Hugh Calveley. Peter abandoned the kingdom without daring to give battle, after retreating several times (first from Burgos, then from Toledo, and finally from Seville) in the face of the oncoming armies. Peter fled with his treasury to Portugal, where he was coldly received by his uncle, King Peter I of Portugal, and thence to Galicia, in northern Spain, where he ordered the murder of Suero, the Archbishop of Santiago, and the dean, Perálvarez. Both the Archbishop and the Dean were supporters of Henry.

Peter of Castile was finally overthrown in 1369, when he was killed by Henry at the Battle of Montiel.

=== Invasion of Valencia ===
The Kingdom of Granada supported Peter of Castile in the War of the Two Peters. Castilian troops and their Moorish allies invaded southern Valencia, which suffered low-level ravaging and political instability. The Castilians unsuccessfully laid siege to Orihuela in 1364.

== End of the war ==
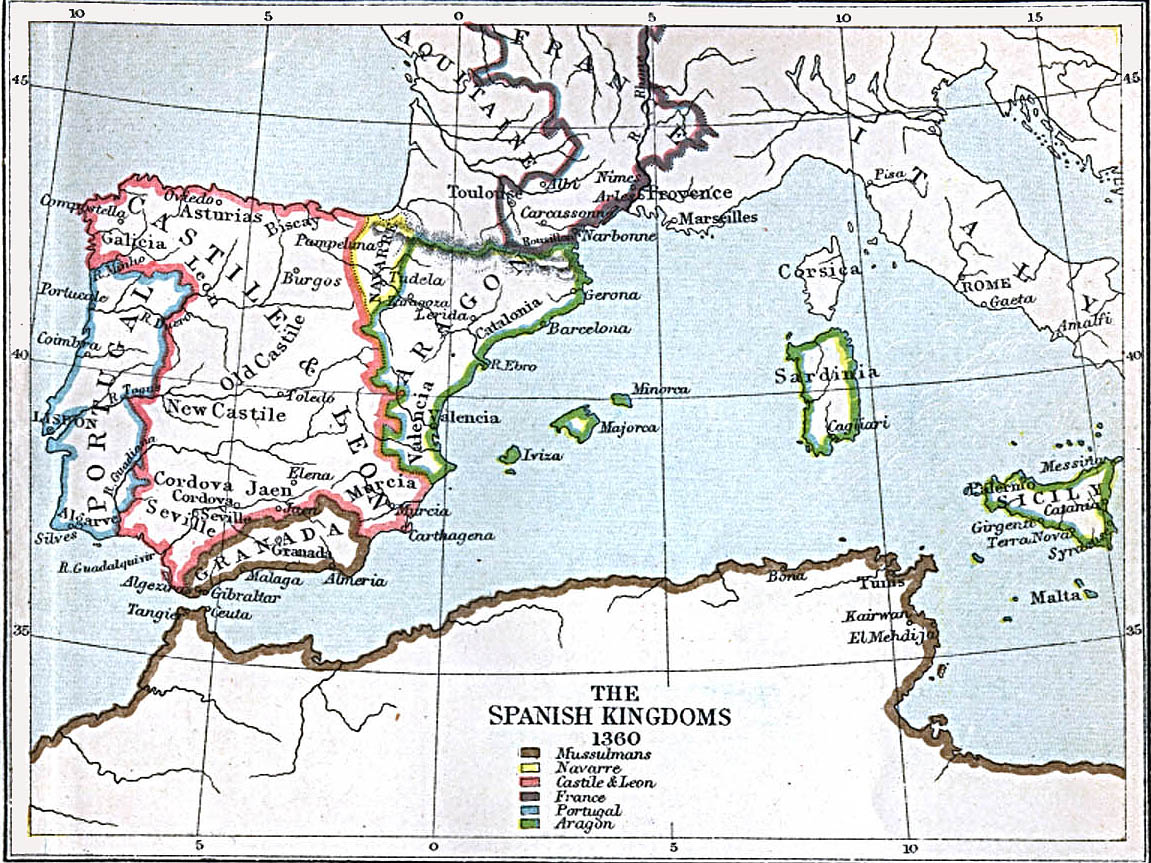
The region in 1360

Castile recovered comarcas that had passed under Aragonese rule, such as the lordship of Molina. A marriage was contracted between Eleanor of Aragon, daughter of Peter IV of Aragon, and John I of Castile, the successor of Henry II of Castile.

The misery of the war was compounded by the Black Death and other natural disasters, such as drought and a plague of locusts. These events ruined the Aragonese economy, leading to a decrease of the country’s population. The Cathedral of Tarazona was destroyed during the war and not rebuilt until much later.

However, the war is believed to have led to the establishment of administrative and military forces that would ultimately result in a unified Castile and Aragon in the next century.

== In popular culture ==
- A battle in the war is dramatized in episode 6 of the Spanish television series, Cathedral of the Sea (2018).

== Bibliography ==
- Kagay, Donald J. (2007). "The Defense of the Crown of Aragon during the War of the Two Pedros (1356–1366)". The Journal of Military History. 71 (1): 11–31. doi:10.1353/jmh.2007.0040. S2CID 201755047. [A later version of this paper appears in Villalon and Kagay (eds.), The Hundred Years War (Part II).]
- Kagay, Donald J. (2012). "The War of the Two Pedros (1356–1366): Aragon's Successful Administrative Strategy of Asymmetrical Defense". Imago Temporis: Medium Aevum. 6: 191–222.
- Kagay, Donald J. (2013). "Disposable Alliances: Aragon and Castille during the War of the Two Pedros and Beyond". Studies in Medieval and Renaissance History. 10: 111–47. [A working version of this paper is available here.]
- Villalon, L. J. Andrew (2008). ""Cut Off Their Heads, or I'll Cut Off Yours": Castilian Strategy and Tactics in the War of the Two Pedros and the Supporting Evidence from Murcia". In L. J. Andrew Villalon; Donald J. Kagay (eds.). The Hundred Years War (Part II): Different Vistas. Leiden: Brill. pp. 153–84.
