= Pedro Cerbuna =

Spanish monk, bishop of Tarazona, and founder of the University of Zaragoza

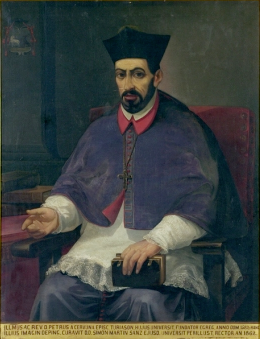
Pedro Cerbuna del Negro (1862) by Nicolás Ruiz de Valdivia

Pedro Cerbuna del Negro (27 February 1538 – 5 March 1597) was a Spanish monk, bishop of Tarazona and founder of the University of Zaragoza. He was born in Fonz and died in Calatayud.

== Life ==
His parents were Juan Nadal Cerbuna, alguacil or sheriff of the Spanish Inquisition and bailiff of Fonz, and of Isabel del Negro y de Ejea. He studied at the universities of Huesca, Valencia, Lérida and Salamanca, where he gained his doctorate in theology in 1563. The following year he was ordained priest at Lérida. He later held several ecclesiastical positions such as professor of theology and vicar general of the diocese of Lérida, canon penitentiary and visitor to Huseca and canon and vicar general to the Archbishop of Zaragoza (1583-85).

He dedicated the income from the Archbishopric of Zaragoza (then vacant) to creating the University of Zaragoza, allowing him to open it on 24 May 1583, almost twenty years after it had first been granted its concession by Charles I of Spain on 10 September 1542. He was consecrated Bishop of Tarazona on 24 November 1585. There he founded a Jesuit college under the patronage of Vincent of Saragossa and a Conciliar Seminary of San Gaudioso. He was also made apostolic administrator of the Diocese of Calahorra by pope Sixtus V. His grave is in the Colegiata de Santa Maria la Mayor in Calatayud.
