= Miguel José Asurmendi Aramendía =

Spanish Roman Catholic bishop

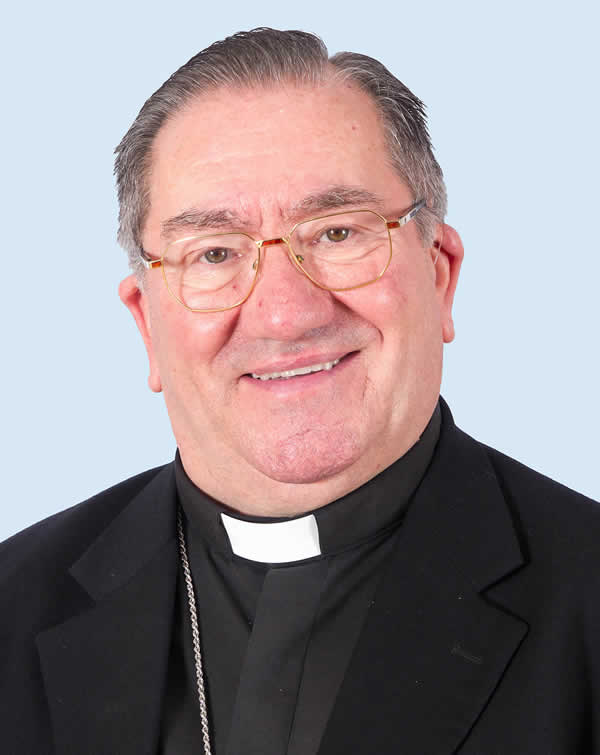
Miguel José Asurmendi (2016).

Miguel José Asurmendi Aramendía (March 4, 1940 – August 9, 2016) was a Spanish Roman Catholic bishop.

Ordained to the priesthood in 1967, he served as bishop of the Roman Catholic Diocese of Tarazona, Spain from 1990 to 1995 and then served as bishop of the Diocese of Vitoria from 1995 to 2016.

== See also ==
- Catholic Church in Spain
