= Veruela Abbey =

Coordinates: 41°48′44″N 1°41′35″W

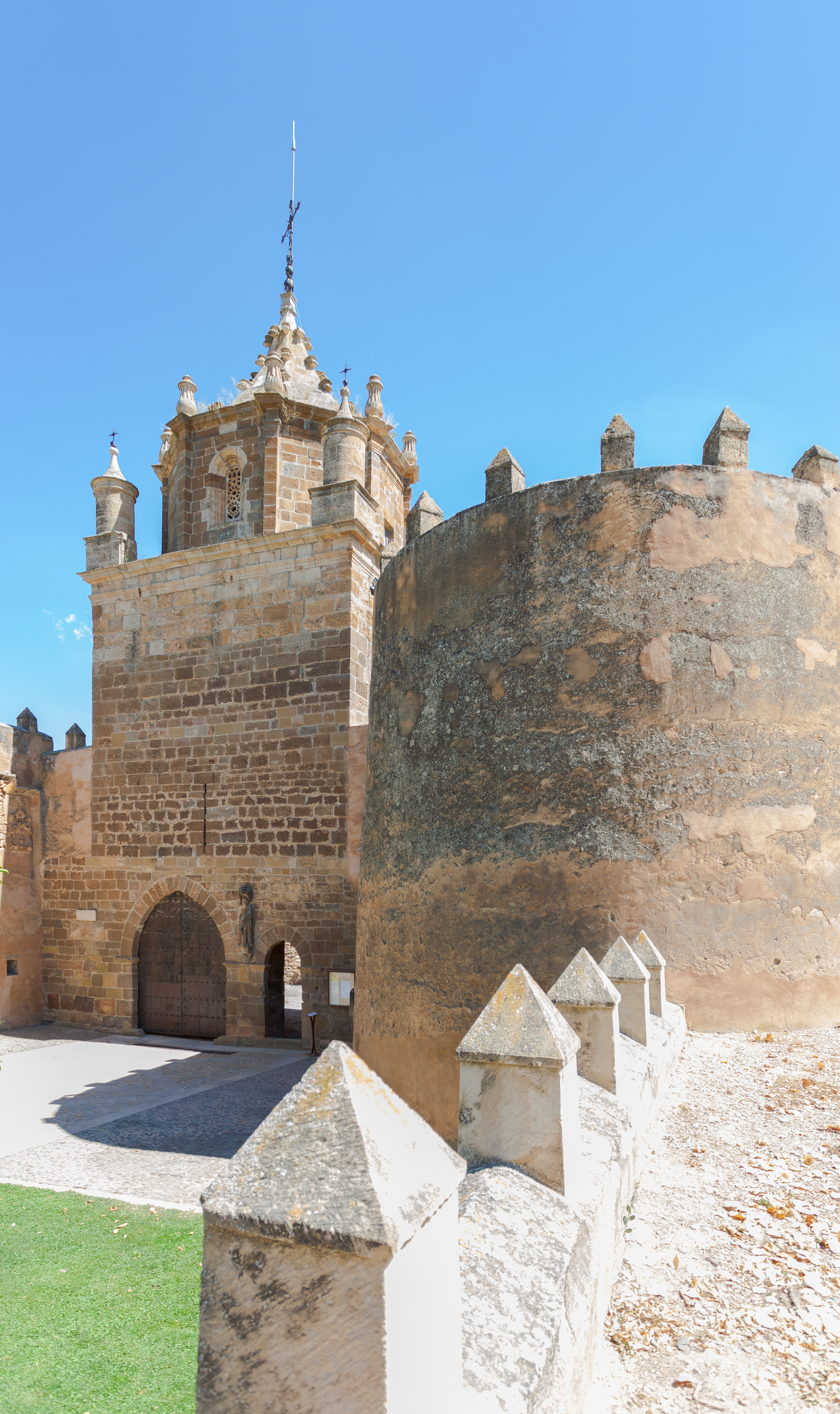
Exterior view.

Veruela Abbey (Spanish: Real Monasterio de Santa María de Veruela, or "The Royal Monastery of Santa María de Veruela") is a Cistercian abbey dating from the 12th century. It is situated near Vera de Moncayo, in Zaragoza province, Spain. It was founded in 1146 by Pedro de Atarés.

== History ==
The monastery and church, forming one edifice, were founded in 1146 by Pedro de Atarés, to whom the Blessed Virgin appeared, and whom she directed to discover a hidden statue of herself, which was placed in the monastery chapel, where it is still venerated.

Pedro de Atarés did not live to see the completion of the buildings, whose construction took more than twenty years, but before his death he was enrolled among the Cistercians, who were dwelling in the partly finished abbey.

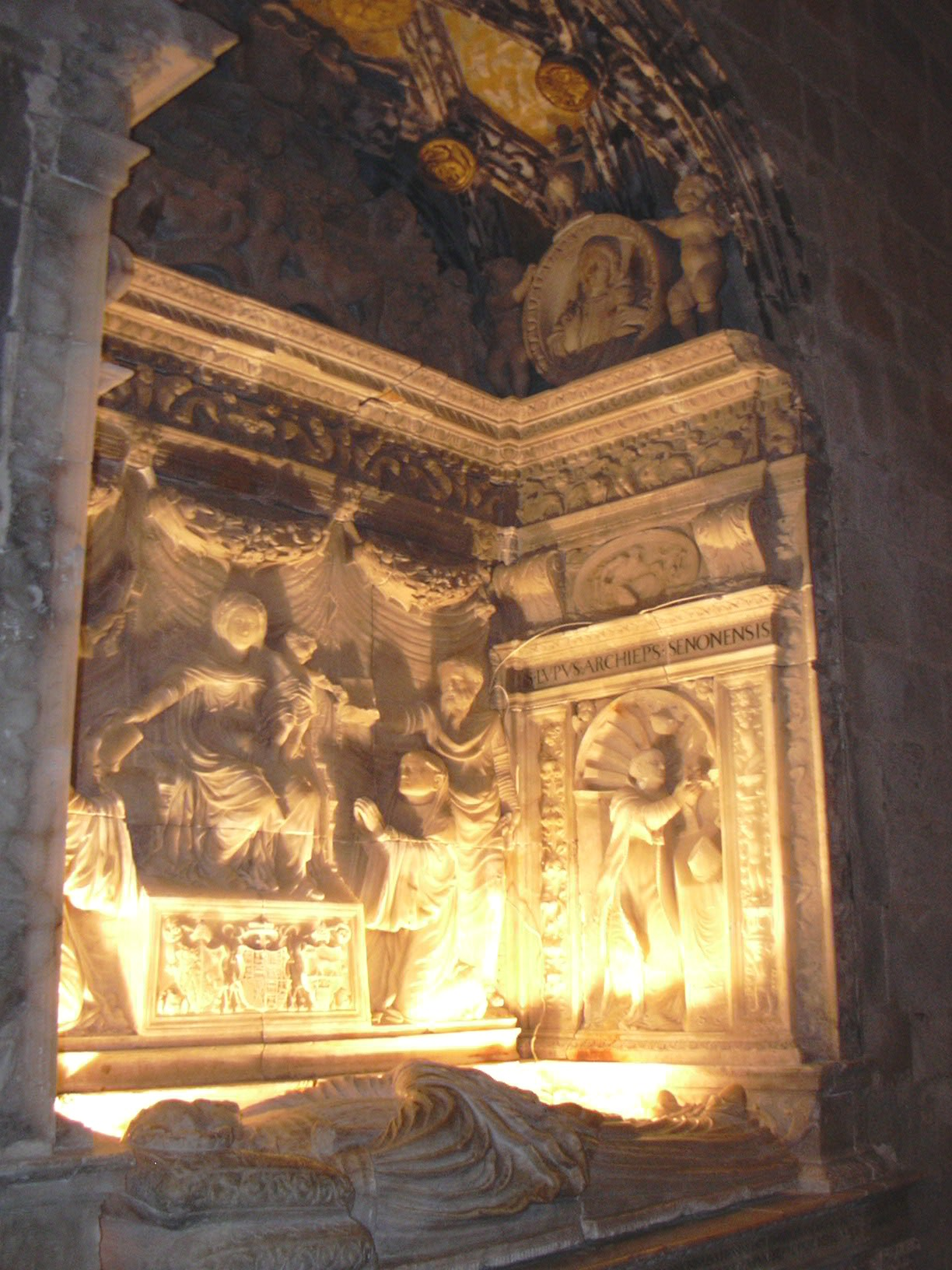
Sepulchre of the abbot Lope Marco

The most famous abbots of Veruela were Hernando de Aragón (1498–1577) and his successor Lope Marco (died 1560), who, according to his epitaph, raised the monastery "ex terreo marmoreum, ex augusto amplum".

The chapter house at the southern side of the cloister (an exact representation of the Westminster Abbey cloister) is Byzantine. The great buildings, including church, monastery, house, and cloister, constructed at different times and in different styles, are surrounded by a wall that dates back to feudal times.

Antonio José Rodríguez, styled by Marcelino Menéndez y Pelayo as "one of the most remarkable cultivators of medical moral studies" (Ciencia espanola, III, 440), lived at Veruela and died within its walls in 1777. Gustavo Becquer, the Spanish poet, made Veruela his abode while the religious were prevented from living there.

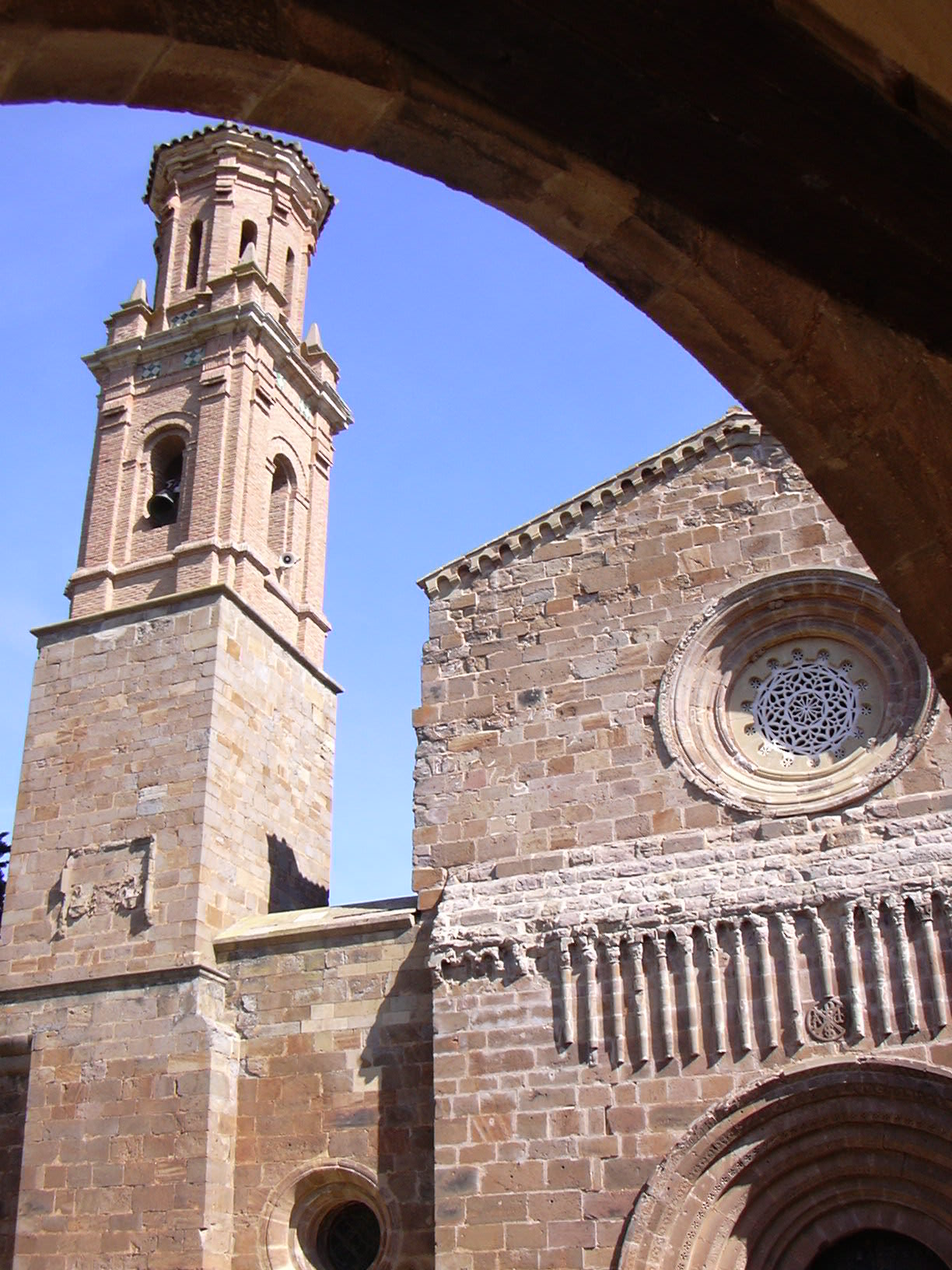
Abbey church, west front and tower

From 1835 to 1877 the buildings were in the hands of secular clergy. From that date they were occupied by Jesuits. Assisted by the duchess of Villahermosa, they restored the church and monastery. Jesuits who lived at Veruela included:

- Antônio de Macedo Costa, a theologian to the First Vatican Council
- Lluís Ignasi Fiter i Cava, who revived the Sodality of Our Lady in Spain
- Antonio Angelini-Rota, later secretary of the Society of Jesus, was the rector of Veruela when in 1888 the image of the Blessed Virgin was solemnly crowned.

== See also ==
- List of Bienes de Interés Cultural in the Province of Zaragoza
- List of Jesuit sites
