= Summary of Decameron tales =

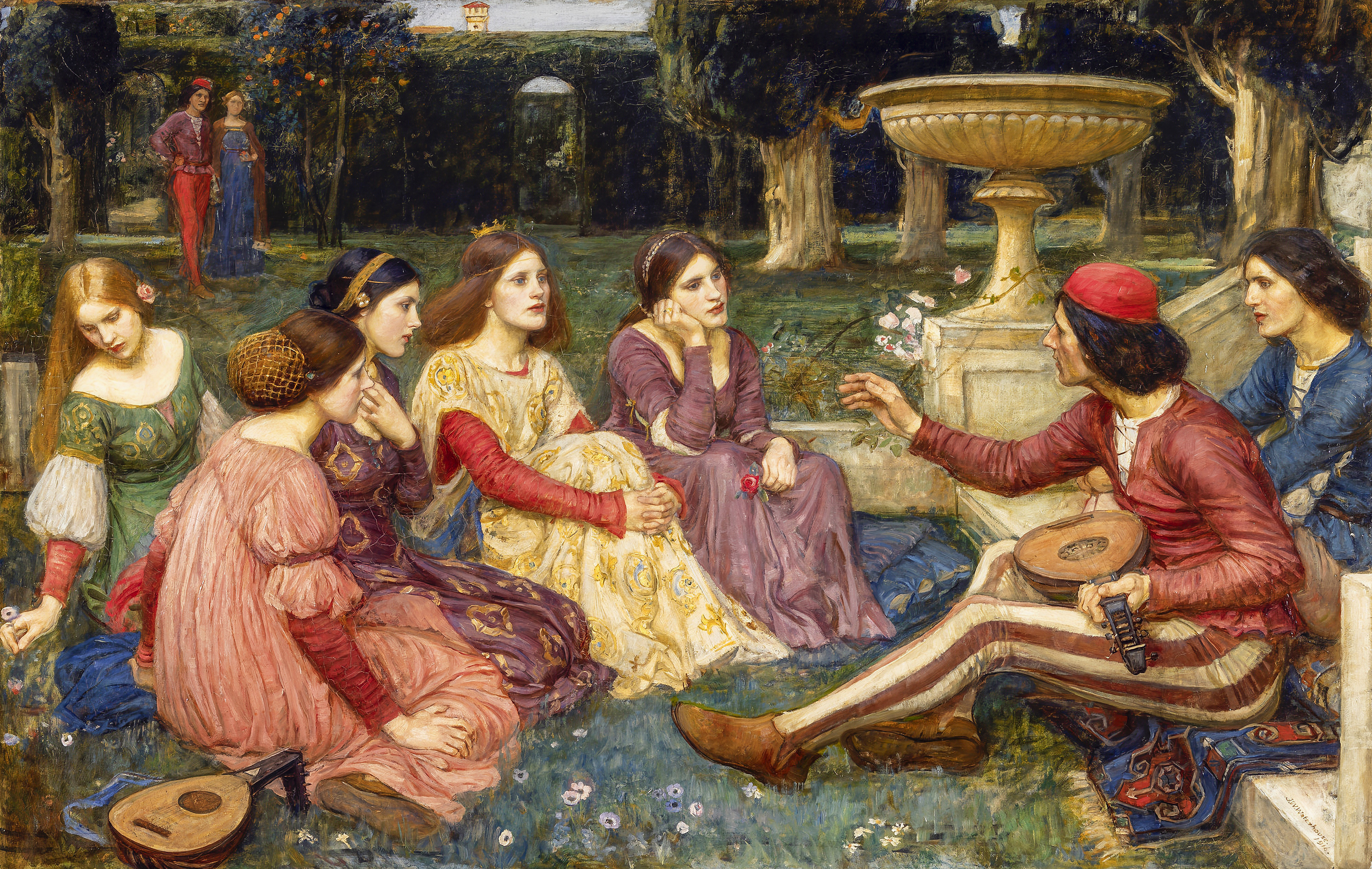
A Tale from The Decameron (1916), by John William Waterhouse

This article contains short summaries of the one hundred stories in Giovanni Boccaccio's The Decameron.

== Introduction ==
In the book's introduction, Boccaccio begins with a graphic description of the Black Death and its devastating effects on the population of Florence. He then introduces ten young Florentines, seven women and three men, referred to as the Brigata. They gather at the Basilica di Santa Maria Novella and together decide to escape the plague by leaving the city to stay in a villa in the countryside. The ten are given fictional names as Boccaccio does not wish to reveal their true identities. The seven women are Pampinea, Fiammetta, Filomena, Emilia, Lauretta, Elissa and Neifile. The three men are Panfilo, Filostrato and Dioneo. Each agrees to tell one story each day for ten days and to appoint one of their number each day as King or Queen to direct the activities of the day, including the afternoon storytelling sessions. The stories are told in the gardens of the two villas that the company stays at, located a few miles outside the city, as well as one day (the seventh) in a nearby natural area known as the Valley of the Ladies.

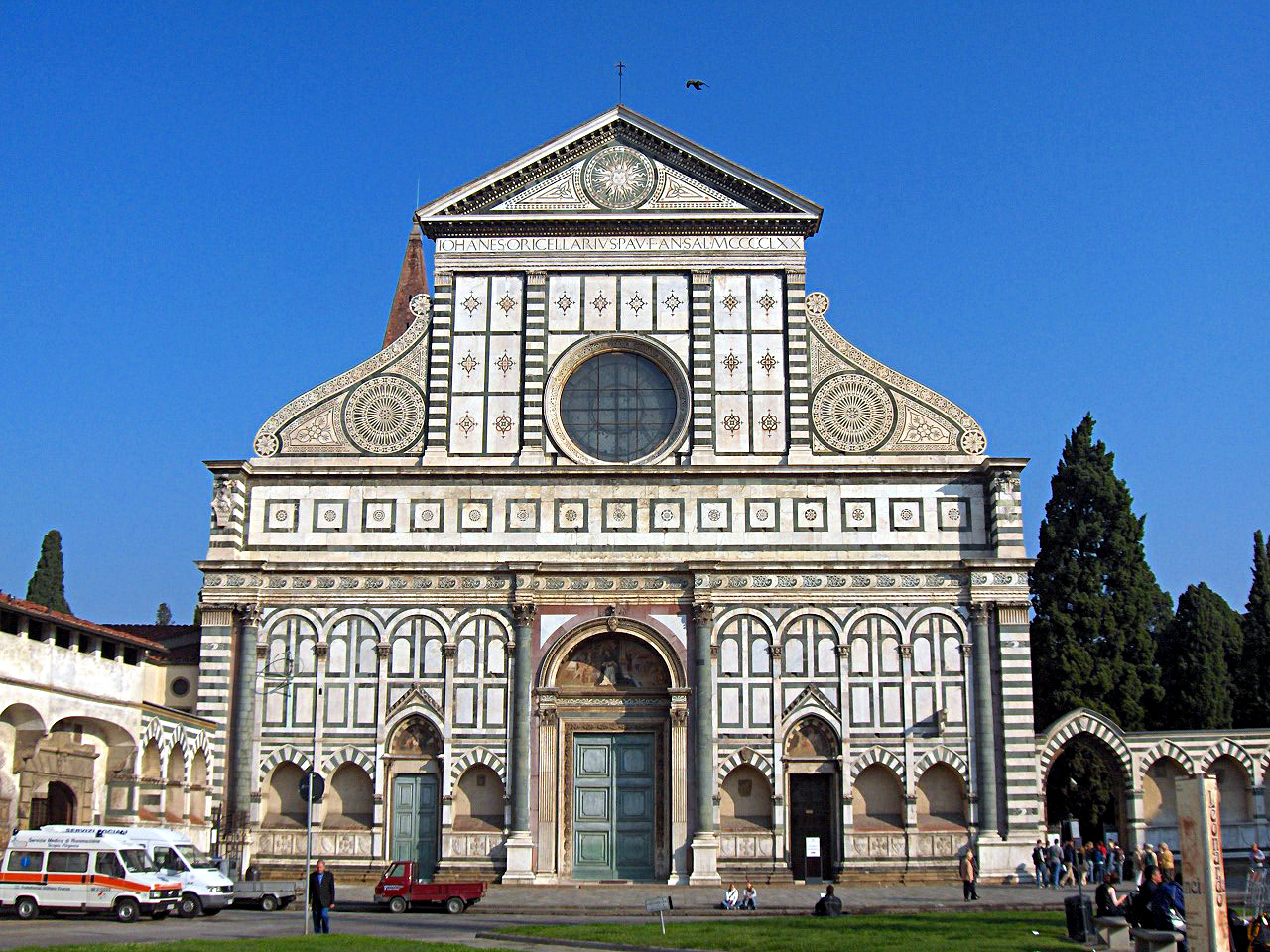
The basilica of Santa Maria Novella, with a Renaissance façade that was completed about 100 years after The Decameron was written

== First day ==
Under the rule of Pampinea, the first day of story-telling is open topic. Although there is no assigned theme of the tales this first day, six deal with one person censuring another and four are satires of the Catholic Church.

=== First tale (I, 1) ===
This story is told by Panfilo.

Ciappelletto, a notoriously wicked man, travels on business to Burgundy, where he is not known, as a favor to the merchant Musciatto Franzesi. Once there, he falls terminally ill. The two Florentine brothers who were housing him during his stay bring a friar from a nearby convent to hear his confession and give him his last rites. Ciappelletto proceeds to tell the friar lies about his life that make him seem very pure, while pretending to be terribly ashamed of what seem minor sins. He is completely believed by the friar, who preaches a sermon on his life after he passes away. The townspeople who hear the sermon believe that he was a holy man, and revere Ciappelletto as a saint long after his death.

This first tale ridicules the then-current practice of the Roman Catholic Church of canonization by the people. The earliest source of this story is found in chapter twenty-three of Saint Sulpicius Severus's biography of Saint Martin of Tours. The biography dates from around 400 AD.

=== Second tale (I, 2) ===
This story is told by Neifile.

Abraham, a Jew of Paris, is the friend of Giannotto di Civignì, who for years has urged him to become a Christian. One day Abraham departs for Rome, telling Giannotto that he wants to see the leaders of the Church – the pope and the curia – to decide whether or not he wants to convert. Giannotto, knowing of the debauched and decadent ways of the Roman clergy, fears Abraham will never want to convert after witnessing the corruption of the Church. But when Abraham returns, he announces that he intends to convert. His time in Rome exposed him to all the sinfulness of the Pope and high clergy, but also convinced him that the Christian religion must be the true one if it continues to survive even with such corrupt leadership.

The earliest source of this tale is in Busone da Gubbio's L'Avventuroso Siciliano, written in Italian in 1311.

=== Third tale (I, 3) ===
This story is told by Filomena.

Saladin, a powerful sultan, finds that his treasury is exhausted. Melchizedek, a Jew, has money enough to cover the shortfall, but Saladin believes he is too greedy to lend it fairly. Saladin tries to trick Melchizedek into giving offense (and justifying the seizure of his wealth) by asking him whether Judaism, Christianity, or Islam is the true Word of God. Melchizedek evades the trap by comparing it to the story of a merchant who had a precious ring and three virtuous sons. Having promised the ring—and with it, his estate—to all three, the king had two equally precious copies made and gave one ring to each son. Thus it could not be determined who was heir to the estate. Likewise, it cannot be determined which faith is the truth. Saladin appreciates Melchizedek's wisdom and decides to be honest with him. In the end, Saladin gets his loan and repays it and Melchizedek gets Saladin's respect and gifts of praise for his intelligence.

Unlike other Medieval and Renaissance authors, Boccaccio treats Jewish people with respect, as this story and the previous one portray the main characters as wise and in a positive light. Boccaccio may have had contact with Jews while living in Naples as a young man. The oldest source is found in a French work by Stephen of Bourbon called The Seven Gifts of the Holy Spirit. However, a slightly younger (c. 1321) Italian story in Bosone da Gubbio's L'avventuroso siciliano was Boccaccio's probable source. This tale was especially popular in the Renaissance and can be found in many versions all over Europe. It is also referred to as "The Tale of the Three Rings" and "The Legend of the Three Rings", and the research of Carlo Ginzburg demonstrated that it was quoted in the heresy trial of the Italian miller Menocchio. The "Parable of the Rings" is also found in Lessing's play Nathan the Wise.

=== Fourth tale (I, 4) ===
Dioneo, who emerges as the most bawdy and sardonic of the storytellers, narrates this tale. Starting with day two, Dioneo insists on always speaking last, and does not always follow the storytelling rules of the day.

A young monk seduces a young woman and is secretly observed by an elder abbot. Realizing he has been seen, the young monk leaves his mistress on pretense of finishing a task. He gives the key to his room to the abbot, who then goes in to make love to the girl himself. The young monk hides and watches all of this, and uses his knowledge to avoid punishment. The monk and the abbot smuggle the woman out of the monastery but continue to bring her back frequently to share her favors.

The earliest surviving source for this anti-clerical tale is found in Cento Novelle Antiche, an Italian compilation of short stories from the end of the 13th century. Boccaccio could have possibly also taken the tale from a French fabliau, "L'Evesque qui benit sa maitresse" ("The bishop who blesses his mistress").

=== Fifth tale (I, 5) ===
Fiammetta tells this story.

The Marquis of Montferrat, on his way to the Crusades, tells King Phillip of France of his happy marriage to the beautiful Marchioness. King Phillip is entranced with the Marquis's description of her and makes an excuse to detour to Montferrat so he can seduce her. He sends a courier ahead to tell the Marchioness that he is arriving soon and would like to be hosted and dine in the estate. The Marchioness devises a plan to keep King Phillip from her. When he arrives, she throws a banquet for King Phillip composed entirely of hens. King Phillip asks whether there are any roosters. The Marchioness replies that there are only hens which, like women, are the same everywhere. King Phillip, surprised by her wit and virtue, finishes the meal and quickly returns to the Crusade.

The story originates from One Thousand and One Nights. The marquis and marchioness at the time of Philip's crusade were William V and Judith of Babenberg.

=== Sixth tale (I, 6) ===
Emilia narrates yet another anti-clerical tale, the fourth of the day so far.

A well-off man, becoming rather tipsy, rashly says that his wine is "good enough for Christ himself". A greedy inquisitor hears this and prosecutes him, imposing onerous penances, which the man performs. One Sunday, the man hears at a mass that "you shall receive an hundredfold and shall possess eternal life". He returns to the inquisitor and remarks on the large amounts of leftover broth being given to the poor each day. He commiserates with the inquisitor saying that, if he receives 100 times as much in the afterlife, he would be drowned. This incenses the inquisitor, but also embarrasses him for his gluttony and for the stinginess of the friars who give only their leftover broth to the poor. He tells the man to depart and never return, which suits the man perfectly.

Some commentators have identified the inquisitor as Pietro dell'Aquila, the inquisitor of Florence in 1345.

=== Seventh tale (I, 7) ===
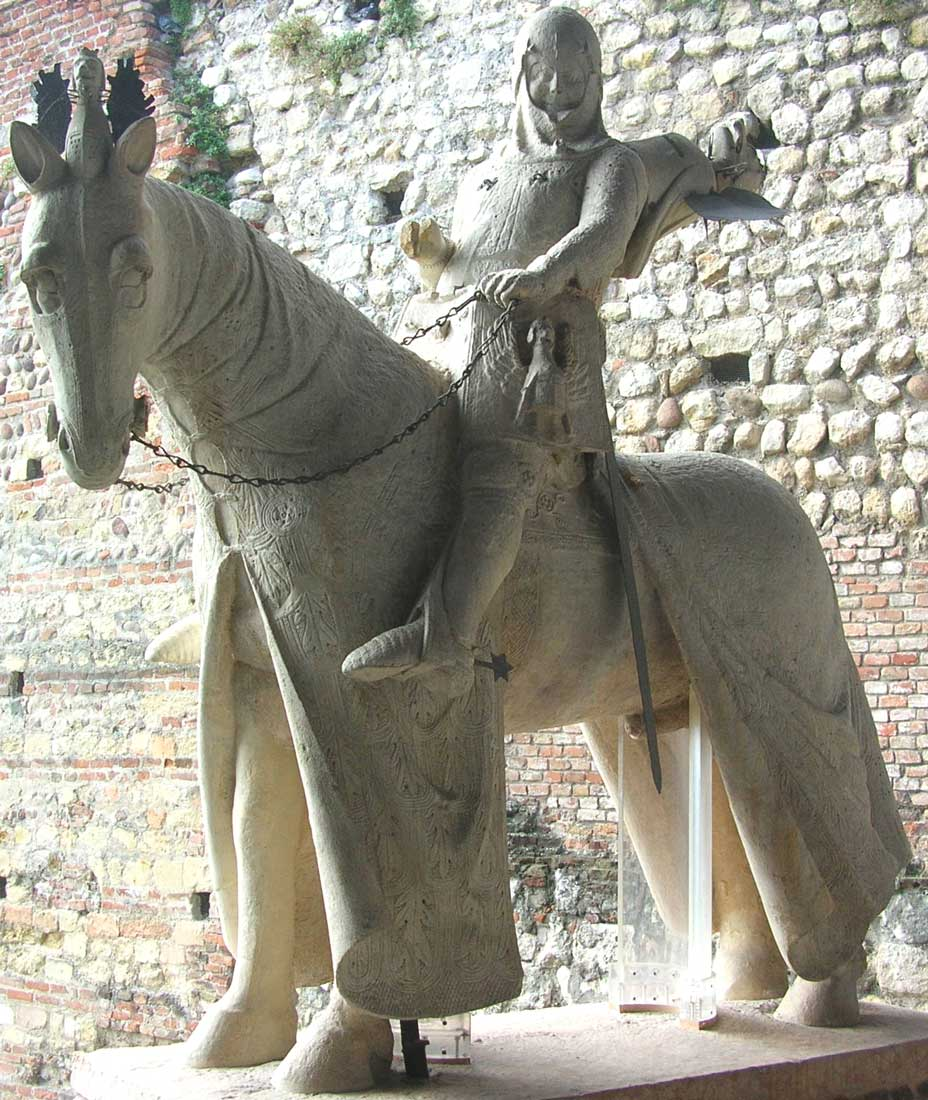
Equestrian statue of Can Grande della Scala

Filostrato tells this tale.

Bergamino, an entertainer widely known for his wit and oratory, is denied the payment he is owed by Messer Cangrande della Scala. Bergamino tells him a story about a famous poet, Primasso (probably Hugh Primas), who was made to wait for bread by the Abbot of Cluny. When the abbot discovered that the man he thought was an unkempt beggar is in fact the famous Primasso, he felt shame and treated the man with full generosity. Cangrande, also ashamed, does the same for Bergamino.

Cangrande I della Scala is best known as Dante's benefactor, whom Dante praises in the Paradiso section of the Divine Comedy, xvii, 68.

=== Eighth tale (I, 8) ===
Lauretta, inspired by the theme of the previous tale, narrates this one.

Messer Ermino de' Grimaldi is one of the richest men in Genoa and one of the stingiest in the world. A courtier named Guglielmo, gifted with great wit and sophistication, comes to the city and associates with the wealthy men there. Grimaldi's shows Guglielmo a new house he had built and asks how the facade could be improved. Guglielmo suggests that the word "generosity" be painted there. Grimaldi takes the hint, and becomes one of the most generous men in the city.

=== Ninth tale (I, 9) ===
Elissa continues the theme of righteous censure.

After making a pilgrimage to Jerusalem, a Gascon lady is brutally assaulted by bandits on Cyprus. The King of Cyprus is weak and cowardly and takes no steps against the bandits. The lady decides to shame the king and asks him to teach her how to accept such attacks and insults with equanimity, since he is so good at doing so himself. This rouses the king out of his lethargy and from that moment he acts to hunt down the bandits and protect his realm.

Boccaccio took this story directly from Cento Novelle Antiche, in which the male character is also the King of Cyprus.

=== Tenth tale (I, 10) ===
Pampinea narrates the last tale of the day.

Master Alberto da Bologna is an accomplished 70-year-old physician who falls in love with a much younger widow. His feelings being obvious, the woman and her friends belittle him. Alberto replies to their taunts by saying that, as an old man, he has learned patience and hope. The widow is impressed with this answer and tells Alberto that he may call upon her.

== Second day ==
Filomena reigns during the second day and assigns the topic to the storytellers: Misadventures that suddenly end happily.

=== First tale (II, 1) ===
The body of St. Arrigo has been credited with a number of miracles and is being displayed in the town to huge crowds. Martellino, a young adventurer, decides on a lark to feign being a paralytic in order to get close to the saint. Unfortunately, a man from his town recognizes Martellino and exposes the fraud. The angry crowd is ready to tear Martellino to pieces, but his two friends accuse him of theft so that he will be arrested and taken away. While Martellino languishes in prison the two friends approach the prince of the town, who finds the whole episode amusing. He releases Martellino and gives all three of the young men new sets of clothing.

Neifile narrates this tale, which, like I, 1, ridicules the Catholic tradition of worshipping the Saints. Although there is no known earlier source for this tale, the part where Martellino's friends are carrying him in on a cot references Mark 2:2 and Luke 5:19.

=== Second tale (II, 2) ===
Rinaldo d'Asti tells some fellow travelers that he always prays to Saint Julian the Hospitaller to bring him a safe and comfortable lodging for the night. The travelers turn out to be bandits who rob Rinaldo of everything and leave him in the snow, with the head bandit commenting sarcastically on St. Julian's failure to help him. Rinaldo, half-naked, finds his way to Castle Guglielmo, where he makes a rough bed outside the door and shivers in the cold. However, the lady inside hears his teeth chattering and sends her maid to invite the man inside. The lady's usual lover has failed to arrive, so she accepts the handsome Rinaldo as a substitute, and the two spend a blissful night in her bed. The thieves are caught and hanged and Rinaldo is again convinced of the power of St. Julian.

This story seems to originate in the Panchatantra, a work originally composed in Sanskrit, and was already 1,500 years old by the time Boccaccio retold it. Filostrato tells this version of the tale.

=== Third tale (II, 3) ===
Three Florentine brothers squander their inheritance and are reduced to poverty. Meanwhile, their nephew Alessandro, who has been attending his uncles' business affairs in England, must flee with the outbreak of civil war there. He joins the entourage of a new abbot traveling to Rome, and the two feel great affection for each other. One night, the abbot invites Alessandro into bed, and Alessandro resists until he discovers that the abbot is actually a woman in disguise. She is, in fact, the daughter of the king of England, and she quickly marries Alessandro in order to avoid being married to the King of Scotland. The couple returns to England, where the King accedes to the marriage and accepts Alessandro into his court.

Pampinea narrates this rather complicated and bizarre tale of which no earlier version is known.

=== Fourth tale (II, 4) ===
Landolfo Ruffolo is a businessman from Ravello who loses his fortune in a risky venture. He turns to piracy instead, at which he is very successful until a storm causes him to be captured by two Genoese ships. Landolfo manages to escape by floating on a chest, and reaches shore at Corfu, where he is hospitably entertained by a woman. Upon opening the chest, it is revealed to contain a fortune in jewels, so Landolfo returns home wealthy and also sends money to the woman.

Lauretta narrates.

=== Fifth tale (II, 5) ===
Andreuccio da Perugia, a naive young man, comes to Naples to buy horses and encounters a series of misadventures. First, an unscrupulous woman pretends to be a relative and invites Andreuccio to her home, but he is robbed by her and thrown outside into a latrine. He then falls in with some graverobbers who drop him into a well to wash off his stink and depart when they see the night watch approaching. Andreuccio manages to climb out of the well and later meets again the graverobbers who plan to plunder an Archbishop's tomb. The robbers betray him and shut him up in the tomb, but he manages to escape when another group of graverobbers pull up the stone. Andreuccio heads for home with only his life and a valuable ring he took from the grave.

Fiammetta tells this story which is actually a combination of two earlier tales. The beginning of the tale is first recorded in about 1228 by Courtois d'Arrass in his Boivin de Provins. The portion of Andreuccio being trapped in the tomb of the archbishop and how he escapes comes from the Ephesian Tale by Xenophon of Ephesus, which was written in about 150 AD. That portion of the tale is so memorable that it was still being told as a true story in the cities and countryside of Europe in the early 20th century.

=== Sixth tale (II, 6) ===
Arrighetto Capece was once governor of Sicily, but when political fortunes change he is put into prison. His wife, Madame Beritola, flees to a remote island, but her two infant sons are taken by pirates. She is so lonely and distraught that she joins a family of deer, nursing the fawns. Currado and his wife visit the island and discover this strange wild woman living with the deer. They take her to Currado's estate, where, by coincidence, her oldest son known as Gianotto is now in service, having escaped the pirates. They live in proximity but mother and son do not recognize each other. Gianotto conducts a forbidden affair with Currado's daughter, and is thrown into prison. Finally, Gianotto hears that the political winds have shifted again and his father could be restored to power in Sicily. He reveals his true identity to Currado and his mother, the younger son is rescued from miserable servitude, and the whole family is reunited as Arrighetto once again governs Sicily.

Emilia tells this story. It resembles the story of Sir Isumbras, which dates from before 1320 and was very popular in medieval England.

=== Seventh tale (II, 7) ===
The Sultan of Babylon sends one of his daughters, the beautiful Alatiel, overseas to be married to the King of Algarve. By a shipwreck and diverse adventures she passes through the hands of nine men in varied places over four years, thoroughly enjoying consorting with most of them. In fact, her beauty proves fatal as several of the men are killed by rivals for her affections. At last she is restored to her father, and, at the advice of a wise counselor, falsely claims to have kept her virginity. She is thus dispatched again to be married to the King of Algarve, as was at first intended.

This scandalous tale is told by Panfilo. There is no agreement on its origin, probably because of the very eclectic nature of the plot, which may have been pieced together from various sources by Boccaccio. Some suggest One Thousand and One Nights or the Ephesian Tale may have given some inspiration to the author for this tale, but not enough that either could definitely be called a source.

=== Eighth tale (II, 8) ===
Walter, the Count of Antwerp, rejects the advances of the wife of the crown prince of France. She responds by falsely accusing him, and as a result he must flee to England. He leaves his two children in different places in England, and takes service in Ireland. Returning to England an unknown man, he finds his son and daughter prosperous. His accuser, whose husband has now become King, becomes deathly ill and determines to confess her false accusation. Her husband the King is mortified by his wife's transgression, and sends out notice that Walter will be restored to high station. Walter reunites with his son and daughter and lives out his life happily in France.

Elissa narrates this story, which shares its theme of a woman's vengeance for being spurned with many ancient stories, including the biblical tale of Potiphar's wife. However, a direct source may be the real-life story of Pierre de La Broce and Lady of Brabant. Dante writes about the soul of the former in Purgatorio, vi. A literary source may have been a Provençal romance written in 1318 by Arnaud Vidal de Castelnaudary called Guillaume de la Barre. However, the theme is so common that pinning down one main source is very difficult.

=== Ninth tale (II, 9) ===
Bernabò of Genoa, while visiting Paris, makes a foolish bet with a trickster called Ambrogiuolo, namely that his wife is so pure that Ambrogiuolo will never be able to seduce her. Ambrogiuolo heads immediately to Genoa where he sneaks into the wife's bedroom and steals some intimate items, as well as observing a mole on her breast. When Ambrogiuolo returns to Paris, he presents this evidence of seduction and Bernabo is forced to pay. The furious Bernabo orders a servant to kill his wife, but she convinces the faithful servant to let her escape. Dressed as a boy, she flees to Egypt and serves the Sultan. She happens to encounter Ambrogiuolo in a marketplace, engages him in conversation, and hears the whole story of how Bernabo was deceived. She lures both Ambrogiuolo and Bernabo to the Sultan, who discovers the truth and harshly punishes Ambrogiuolo. Bernabo is reconciled with his wife and they return to Genoa.

Filomena tells this story, which is best known to English readers through the subplot of Posthumus and Iachimo in Shakespeare's Cymbeline. The oldest known version of this story is a French romance from the 13th century called Roman de la Violette ou de Gerard de Nevers by Gilbert de Montreuil.

=== Tenth tale (II, 10) ===
Ricciardo di Chinzica, an aging jurist, marries a much younger woman called Bartolomea and is unable to satisfy her sexual needs, giving the excuse that almost all days are "holy days." On a fishing trip, Bartolomea is kidnapped by the pirate Paganino who has no such scruples about holy days. Ricciardo discovers them in Monaco and sues to get his wife back. However, Bartolomea does not wish to remain married to a man who has no intention of "tilling her field." Ricciardo returns home and dies of shame, which allows Bartolomea to marry Paganino.

In the last tale of the second day Dioneo begins his pattern of telling the last tale of the day, which he will continue until the end of the Decameron. The moral of the story – that a young woman should not marry an old man – is common in late medieval vernacular literature.

== Third day ==
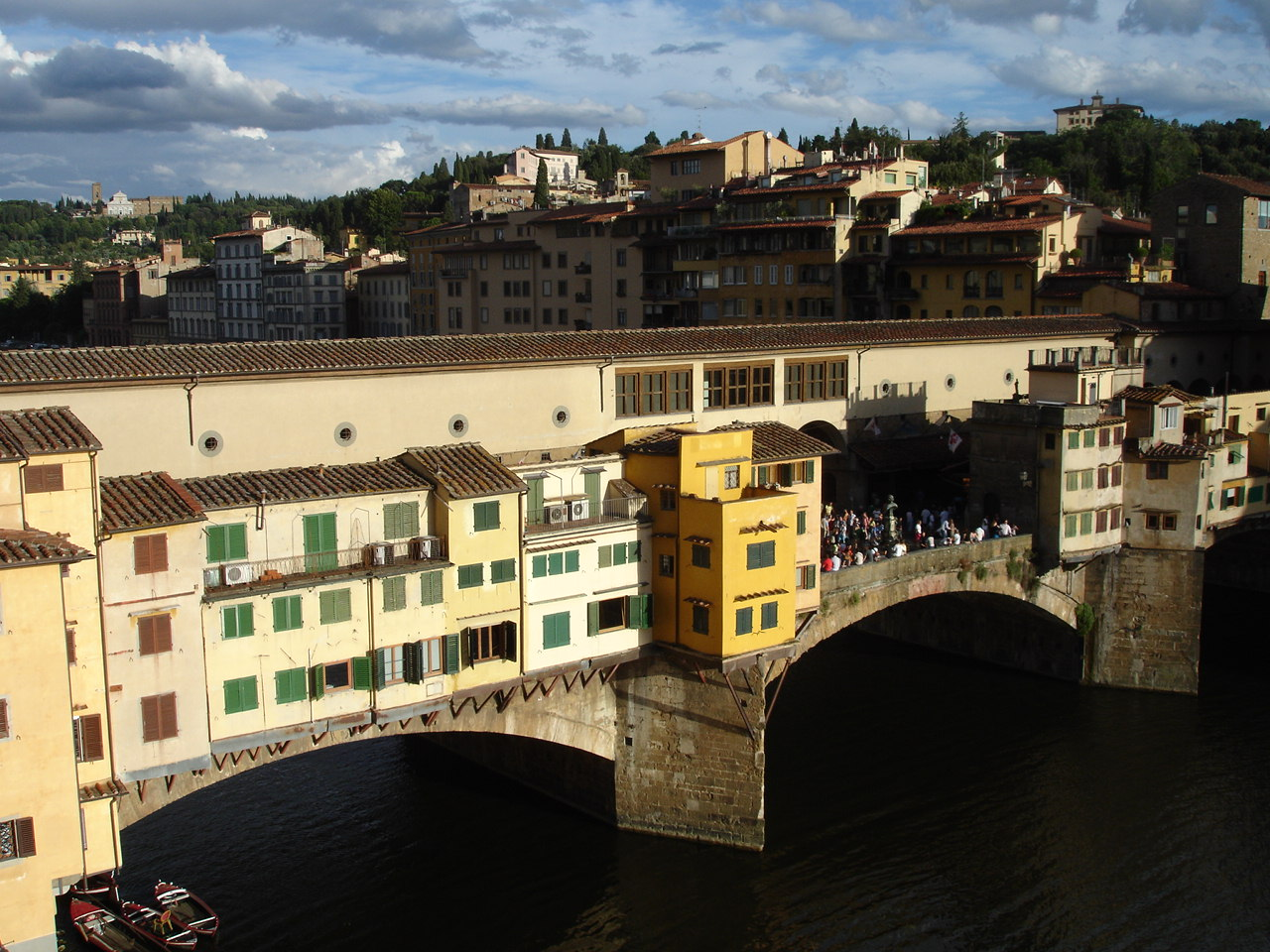
The Ponte Vecchio, which was brand new in Boccaccio's time, in Florence. The city is the setting of many stories of the Decameron.

Neifile reigns during the third day. In these stories a person either has painfully acquired something or has lost it and then regained it.

=== First tale (III, 1) ===
Masetto da Lamporecchio hears about a convent with many young nuns and devises a way to be hired as gardener, feigning to be deaf and mute. The nuns soon begin coaxing the handsome man to have sex with them, figuring that a deaf mute will never be able to tell on them. Masetto goes happily along with this until the abbess takes notice of him and starts to monopolize his time and energy. Finally, Masetto reveals that he can speak and insists that he be put on a reasonable work schedule. The abbess agrees to this, and he remains many years at the convent, servicing the nuns' needs.

Filostrato's tale of a man's scheme to enjoy the favors of a convent of nuns was also in Cento Novelle Antiche from the 13th century.

=== Second tale (III, 2) ===
A groom becomes so enamored of the wife of King Agilulf that he is determined to have her or die trying. When the King is away, the groom impersonates the King, who is of similar height and build, and enjoys carnal relations with the queen several times in one night. However, the King returns unexpectedly in the early hours and initiates sex, causing the queen to comment on how frisky he has been and that maybe he should not overexert himself. The King now realizes what has happened, and is determined to find the culprit without dishonoring his wife. He goes to the hall where all the grooms are sleeping, identifies the one with the fastest heartbeat, and cuts off a clip of his hair to identify him later. However, the groom was awake and cuts similar clips of hair from all the other grooms, making identification impossible. Thus the groom manages to get away with his transgression, but knows he must never try it again.

Pampinea's clever tale originates in either the Panchatantra, a Sanskrit story from the 4th century AD, or the Histories of Herodotus. However, Boccaccio's version is unique in that the husband in the tale preserves both his honor and that of his wife, and emphasis on "keeping up appearances" that is distinct of the Renaissance merchant class, to which Boccaccio belonged.

=== Third tale (III, 3) ===
A merchant's wife in Florence becomes enamored of a fine gentleman. Unable to approach him directly, she instead uses the services of a friar, asking him to approach the gentleman and convince him to stop bothering her. The gentleman realizes that the opposite is intended and the friar continues as an unwitting go-between as the affair blossoms. When she accuses him through the friar of climbing up to her window while her husband is out of town, she is giving the gentleman the hint that it is safe to visit her.

Filomena narrates this story.

=== Fourth tale (III, 4) ===
Friar Puccio is married to Donna Isabetta, but fails to satisfy her because he is always advocating abstinence and saintly duties. Another Friar, Dom Felice, decides to provide the service that Puccio is not providing. To distract Puccio, Felice convinces him that he will be assured of going to heaven if he practices an elaborate 40-day penance with much prayer and fasting. While Puccio is so occupied, Isabetta and Felice are cavorting in the bedroom, a practice they continue even after the 40 days are over.

Panfilo narrates.

=== Fifth tale (III, 5) ===
Messer Francesco Vergellesi is a haughty governor who requires a magnificent new horse for his entry into Milan. A man called Zima has just such a horse, but is enamored of the governor's wife and thus agrees to give over the horse only if he is allowed to speak to the wife. Vergellesi agrees, but instructs his wife not to answer when Zima speaks. As a result, Zima, performs both sides of the conversation and thus plays out a scenario in which the wife yields to his advances. The wife becomes smitten with Zima and becomes his mistress after her husband departs for Milan.

This tale is originally found in Hitopadesha, a Sanskrit collection of tales. Boccaccio, though, may have directly taken the tale from The Seven Wise Masters, which, although oriental in origin, was widely circulating in Latin at the time the Decameron was written. Elissa narrates.

=== Sixth tale (III, 6) ===
Ricciardo Minutolo loves Catella, the wife of Filippello. Knowing her to be jealous, Ricciardo makes her believe Filippello is having an affair with his (Ricciardo's) wife and is due to meet her at a hammam (Turkish bathhouse). Catella decides to surprise her husband by taking the place of his mistress at the steamy bathhouse. But in fact, it is Ricciardo there, not her husband, as she discovers after Ricciardo has lain with her. Although furious at first, Catella warms up to Ricciardo's entreaties and becomes his mistress.

Fiammetta tells this tale, which like the previous one, was taken from The Seven Wise Masters.

=== Seventh tale (III, 7) ===
Tedaldo conducted an affair with a married lady, Ermillina the wife of Aldobrandino Palermini, until she rejected him, causing him to leave Florence for several years. Upon returning, he hears that Tedaldo (i.e. himself) has been murdered by Aldobrandino. Tedaldo approaches Ermillina, who mistakes him for a prophetic friar and tells him that she rejected Tedaldo all those years ago on the advice of another friar. Tedaldo convinces her that most friars are corrupt and that following this advice has caused nothing by grief for all. She promises never to reject Tedaldo again if he returns. Tedaldo eventually reveals his true identity to his brothers and to Ermillina. Aldobrandino is freed and the real identity of the murdered man and his killers is discovered. Tedaldo and Ermillina happily resume their affair.

Emilia narrates this tale, which has no known previous version.

=== Eighth tale (III, 8) ===
An abbot falls in love with the beautiful wife of Ferondo, a simpleton. He convinces her that they should send Ferondo to purgatory for a time, and do so by giving him a sleeping powder and then having him wake up in a cellar where he is beaten daily. He promises never to be jealous of his wife again. Meanwhile, the abbot regularly visits the wife wearing Ferondo's clothing. After some months, the wife becomes pregnant by the abbot. This calls for Ferondo to be released from purgatory to take charge of his new son. Ferando keeps his promise not to be jealous, allowing the abbot to see the wife regularly.

Lauretta's tale of the elaborate ruses that an abbot undertakes to enjoy Ferondo's wife was probably taken by Boccaccio from a French fabliau by Jean de Boves called Le Vilain de Bailleul. Boccaccio not only capitalizes on the tale to poke fun at the clerics of his day, but also at the simple-mindedness of some of his countrymen.

=== Ninth tale (III, 9) ===
Gillette, daughter of a doctor in Narbonne, is in love with Count Bertrand, who considers her below his station. The King of France develops a chest ailment, which Gillette is able to cure. The King promises her any man she wishes in marriage, and she chooses Count Bertrand, who has no choice but to comply. However, the petulant Bertrand delays consummating the marriage and goes off to wage war in Italy. Bertrand writes her that he will live with her only when she comes to him with Bertrand's ring and his child in her arms. Meanwhile, Bertrand is smitten with a beautiful young poor girl in Florence. Gillette goes to Florence and works out a deception whereby Bertrand sleeps with her and gives her a ring, thinking her to be the poor girl he covets. Gillette gives birth to twin boys and, after confronting Bertrand with his sons and the ring, he agrees to accept her as his wife.

Neifile narrates this tale, which later became the basis for Shakespeare's play All's Well That Ends Well (c. 1598). The ring plotline may derive from the Sanskrit The Recognition of Śakuntalā. Boccaccio may have taken the tale from an 11th-century French version.

=== Tenth tale (III, 10) ===
Dioneo narrates what is the most sexually explicit tale in the Decameron. Alibech, a naive young woman, wanders into the desert in an attempt to become closer to God. She happens upon the monk Rustico, and he deflowers her under the pretense of teaching her how to better please God. Alibech becomes more enthusiastic about "putting the Devil back into Hell" (sexual intercourse) than Rustico, almost to the point of his ruin. Meanwhile, her family and family home are incinerated, leaving her the only heir. Neerbale kidnaps her, much to Rustico's relief and Alibech's displeasure, and Alibech is made to marry Neerbale. The night before the wedding, she is questioned by other women as to how Alibech served God in the desert, and upon explaining to them how the Devil is put back into Hell, the amused ladies inform her that her new husband will surely help her serve God once more.

Because of its graphic nature, this tale has at times been translated incompletely, as in John Payne's translation, where Alibech's sexual awakening is left untranslated and is accompanied with this footnote: "The translators regret that the disuse into which magic has fallen, makes it impossible to render the technicalities of that mysterious art into tolerable English; they have therefore found it necessary to insert several passages in the original Italian." No known earlier versions of it exist.

== Fourth day ==
Boccaccio begins this day with a defense of his work as it is thus far completed. Although he says that portions of the earlier days were circulating among the literate citizens of Tuscany while the work was in progress, this is doubtful. Instead, Boccaccio is probably just shooting down potential detractors. The reader must remember that vernacular fictional prose was not a respected genre in 14th century Italy and some of the criticisms Boccaccio combats in the introduction to the fourth day were common attitudes towards the genre. Others, however, were specific to the Decameron itself.

One criticism of the latter type was that it was not healthy for a man of Boccaccio's age – approximately 38 – to associate with young ladies, to whom the work is supposedly written. To defend against this criticism, Boccaccio tells a story explaining how natural it is for a man to enjoy a woman's company. In this story, Filipo Balducci is a hermit living with his son on Mount Asinaio after the death of his wife and travels occasionally to Florence for supplies. One day his son – now eighteen and having never before left the mountain – accompanies him because Filipo is too infirm to make the journey alone. While there the son becomes fascinated with women, even though he had never seen one before and Filipo regrets ever bringing his son to Florence.

This is commonly referred to as the 101st story of the Decameron. The story originates in the Ramayana, a Sanskrit epic from the 4th century BCE. The tale was quite common during the medieval era, appearing in Barlaam and Josaphat (written in the 8th century), an exemplum of Jacques de Vitry (13th century) and Cento Novelle Antiche (also 13th century), The Seven Wise Masters, and Italian collection of fables called Fiore di virtù (14th century), Odo of Shirton's De heremita iuvene (12th century), and a French fabliau (13th century). The last two are the most probable sources for Boccaccio because in them the father refers to the women as "geese", whereas in the earlier versions he calls them "demons" who tempt the souls of men.

Filostrato reigns during the fourth day, in which the storytellers tell tales of lovers whose relationship ends in disaster. This is the first day a male storyteller reigns.

=== First tale (IV, 1) ===
Tancredi, Prince of Salerno keeps his daughter, Ghismonda, on a tight leash. Her loneliness pushes her to find a lover, Guiscardo the valet. Tancredi surprises the lovers and is furious at his daughter's transgression with a low-born man. Ghismonda informs her father that if he kills Guiscardo she will join him in death. Tancredi doesn't believe her, so he orders Guiscardo to be killed and sends his daughter her lover's heart in a chalice. Ghismonda pours a deadly poison into the chalice and drinks it.

Fiammetta narrates this tale, whose earliest source is a French manuscript written by a man named Thomas. However, it is referred to in the early 12th century narrative of Tristan and Iseult.

=== Second tale (IV, 2) ===
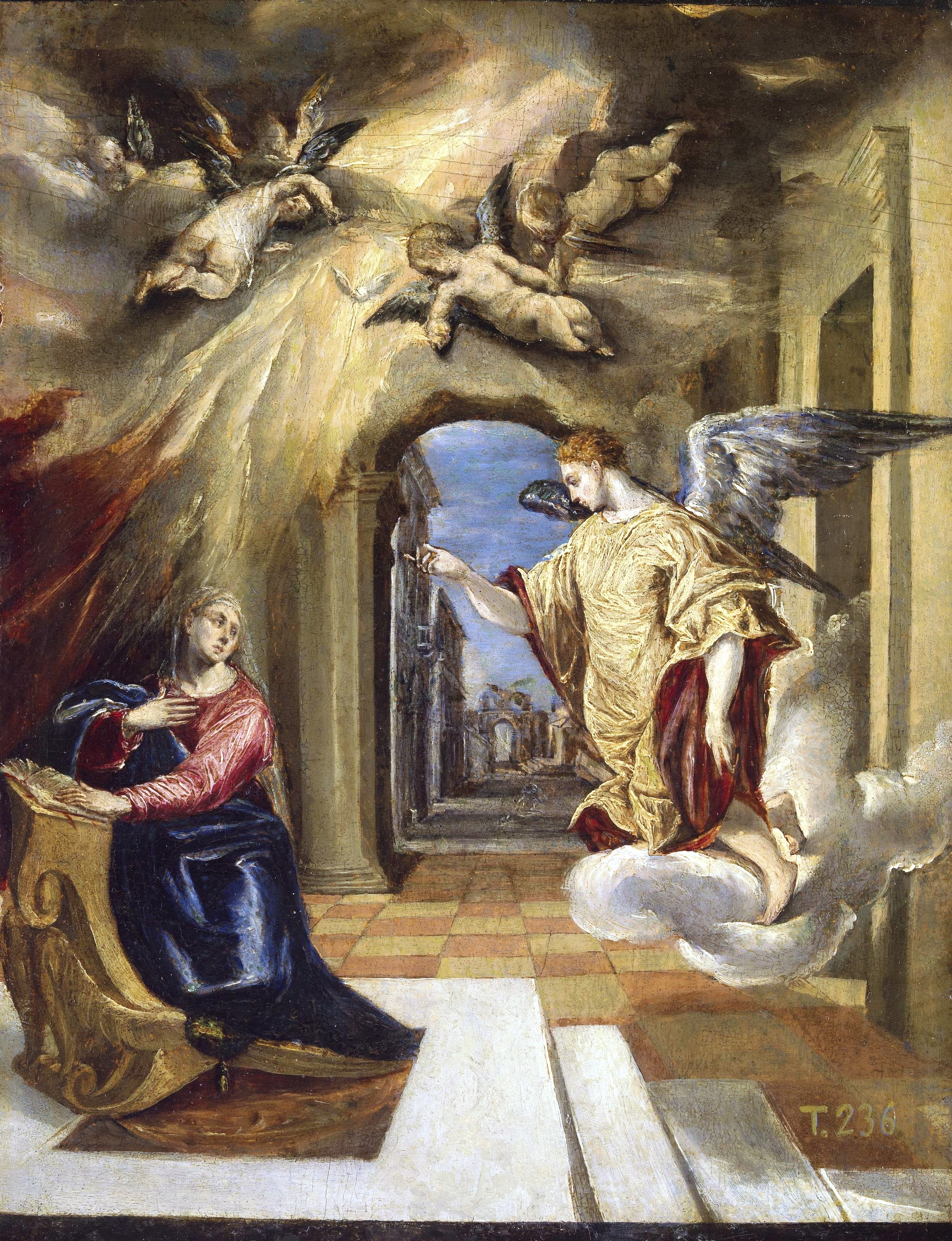
The Archangel Gabriel in an Annunciation by El Greco

Friar Alberto deceives a woman in Venice into believing that the Archangel Gabriel is in love with her. As an excuse to sleep with her, Alberto tells her that Gabriel can enter his body. Her brothers discover the deception and come for him at the woman's house, but he flings himself out of her window and finds shelter in the house of a poor man. The poor man also knows of the Gabriel ruse, but pretends that he will help Alberto escape. The next day, he leads Alberto into the piazza as a caged wild man. Being recognized, he is apprehended by his fellow friars and imprisoned.

Pampinea tells the second tale of the day, which is a very ancient tale. Supposedly it comes from an episode in the life of Alexander the Great. Other previous renderings include Josephus's Jewish Antiquities, the Pantschantantra, and One Thousand and One Arabian Nights.

=== Third tale (IV, 3) ===
Three sisters of Marseille love three unsuitable men, and thus determine to flee with them to Crete. The eldest sister, Ninetta, discovers that her lover has become unfaithful, and poisons him. The crime is discovered by the Duke of Crete who announces that he will burn Ninetta at the stake. The second sister, Maddelena, knows that the Duke is enamored of her, so offers herself to him in exchange for her sister's life. Maddelena's husband discovers this, kills Maddelena out of jealousy, and the escapes the island with Ninetta. The youngest daughter, Bertella, and her husband are now under suspicion for the murder of Maddelena, but they escape the island to Rhodes and live out their lives in poverty.

Lauretta narrates this story.

=== Fourth tale (IV, 4) ===
Gerbino, the grandson of King William of Sicily, is determined to be united with the beautiful daughter of the King of Tunis, and she likewise has become enamored of Gerbino, even though they know each other only by reputation and surreptitious love letters. When the King of Tunis announces his intention to marry his daughter to the King of Grenada, he asks for and receives a guarantee from King William that Gerbino will not interfere. Gerbino, however, betrays this trust and instead takes two ships and attacks the Tunisian transport. In the battle, the daughter is killed and the furious Gerbino slays all of the Tunisians. King William is mortified at this betrayal of his promise and, when Gerbino returns, has him beheaded.

There is no known source for Elissa's tale.

=== Fifth tale (IV, 5) ===
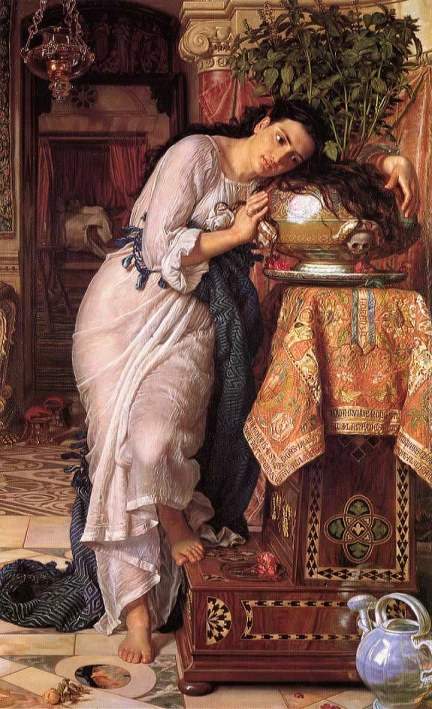
Isabella and the Pot of Basil by William Holman Hunt

Lisabetta's brothers slay her lover Lorenzo. He appears to her in a dream and tells her where he is buried. She discovers the corpse, removes the head, and sets it in a pot of basil, which she weeps over daily. The brothers notice her obsession with the pot of basil and remove it, discovering Lorenzo's head, which they rebury and then flee to another city. Lisabetta dies of grief shortly thereafter.

Filomena tells this story, one of the most famous in the Decameron, and the basis of John Keats' narrative poem Isabella, or the Pot of Basil.

=== Sixth tale (IV, 6) ===
Andreuola loves Gabriotto, a man of lower station whom she cannot marry. They meet regularly in her garden. They each relate gruesome dreams they have had, filled with deathly imagery. At this point, Gabriotto dies in his lover's arms. Andreula cannot allow her illicit lover's body to be found in her garden, so she and her maid take to body to Gabriotto's house, but they are apprehended and Andreuola is accused of his murder. The magistrate offers to drop the charges if Andreuola will sleep with him, but she refuses. A medical examination reveals that Gabriotto died of a heart attack, and charges are dropped. Disgusted with the ways of the world, Andreuola decides to take the veil.

Panfilo, the first male storyteller of the day to narrate, tells this tale.

=== Seventh tale (IV, 7) ===
Simona loves Pasquino; they are together in a garden. Pasquino rubs a leaf of sage against his teeth, and dies. Simona is arrested, and, with intent to show the judge how Pasquino died, rubs one of the leaves of the same plant against her teeth, and likewise dies. When the sage is dug up, a venomous toad is discovered. The two lovers are buried together.

Emilia narrates.

=== Eighth tale (IV, 8) ===
Girolamo and Salvestra loved each other in youth. Girolamo goes to Paris for some years and returns to find Salvestra married. Unable to give her up, he enters her house by stealth, lays himself by her side, and dies. Salvestra's husband helps her to carry the body to the church, but when Salvestra sees his corpse in the coffin, she is overcome by grief for her first love, and also dies.

Neifile narrates.

=== Ninth tale (IV, 9) ===
Two knights of Provence, Guillaume de Roussillon and Guillaume de Cabestaing are friends until Rousillon's wife becomes the lover of Cabestaing. Rousillon ambushes Cabestaing, slays him, and cuts out his heart. He has his cook prepare the heart in a delicious manner and his wife eats every morsel. He then reveals to his wife that she has just eaten her lover's heart. She replies that she can never eat any more food since she has eaten the most perfect dish imaginable, and proceeds to throw herself from the castle tower. Roussillon flees and the lovers are buried together.

Filostrato tells this story, which has so many similarities with tale IV, 1 that both tales could have shared sources.

=== Tenth tale (IV, 10) ===
The neglected wife of an aging doctor takes a roguish lover named Ruggieri. While the doctor is away, Ruggieri finds a drink in the house that turns out to be a strong opiate. Believing her lover to be dead, the wife puts him in a chest which she and her maid bring to the street. Two men spot the chest in the street and decide to steal it and take it to their home. When Ruggieri awakens and topples the chest, the men's wives are startled and Ruggieri is taken to the magistrate where he is sentenced to be hanged for previous crimes. However, the doctor's wife induces her maid to give false testimony and also to give herself to the magistrate, thus saving Ruggieri, who continues as the lover of the doctor's wife.

Dioneo, whose stories are exempt from being governed by the theme of each day, tells this tale of Buddhist origin.

== Fifth day ==
During the fifth day Fiammetta, whose name means small flame, sets the theme of tales where lovers pass through disasters before having their love end in good fortune.

=== First tale (V, 1) ===
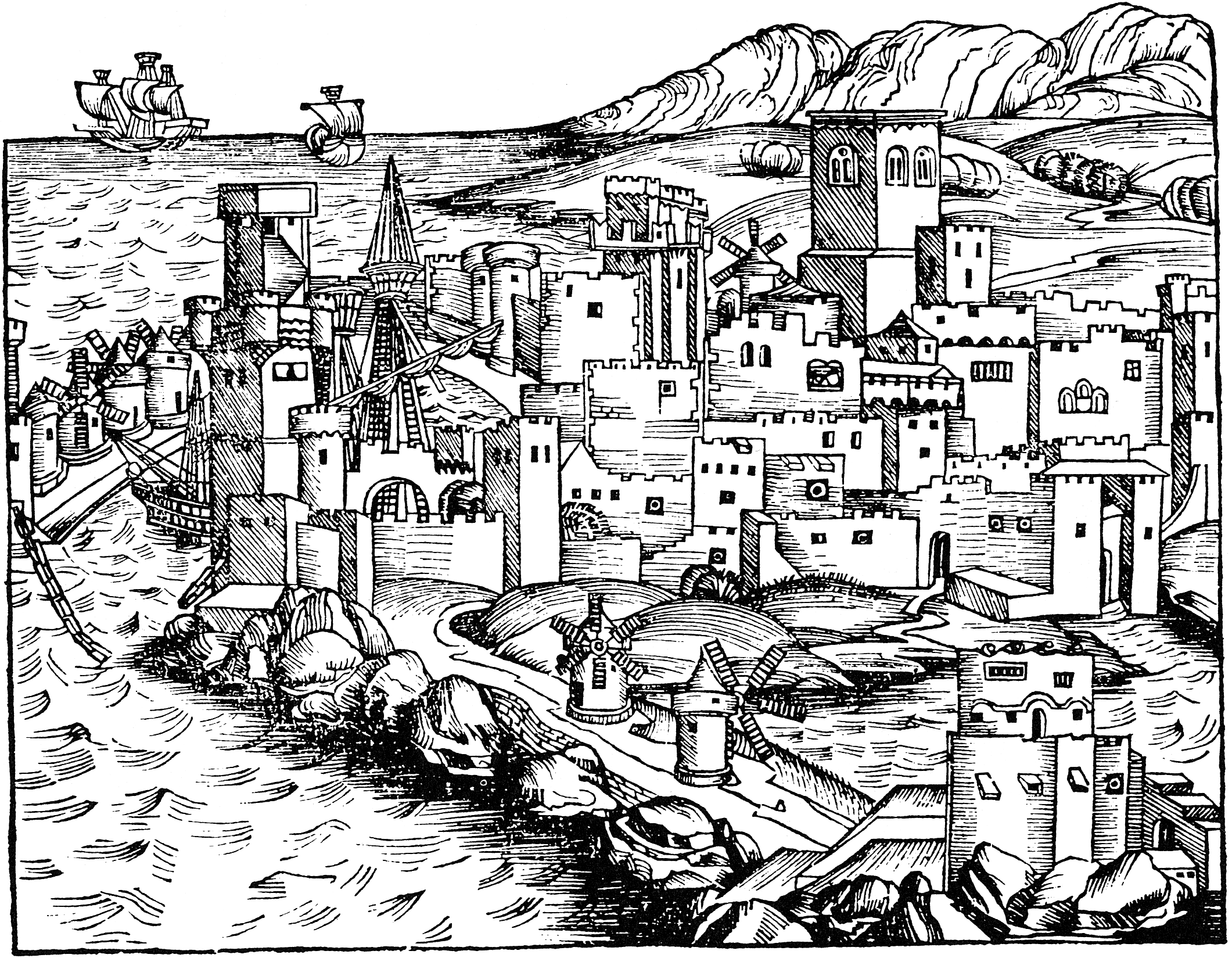
Rhodes, from a 1493 woodcut

Cimon, known as a rough-hewn simpleton, meets the lovely Iphigenia in the woods and is so captivated by her that he begins behaving like a respectable gentleman. Cimon sues for Iphigenia's hand, but she is already promised to another. Cimon captures her on the high seas and both are brought to Rhodes, where Cimon is imprisoned. A magistrate called Lysimachus wants to marry Cassandra, who is also promised to another man. Lysimachus approaches Cimon with a plan. They decide to kidnap their respective loves. Lysimachus and Cimon crash the double wedding ceremony and make off with the brides Cassandra and Iphigenia. They sail to Crete, where the two couples are married.

Like the tale in the introduction to the fourth day, Panfilo's tale seems to derive from the story of Barlaam and Josaphat. 's hand

=== Second tale (V, 2) ===
Gostanza and Martuccio are in love, but Martuccio is too poor to marry her. He departs to seek his fortune, but turns to piracy and winds up imprisoned in Tunis. Gostanza hears a false report that her lover is dead and casts herself to sea in a small boat thinking to end her life. The boat is blown to North Africa, where Gostanza takes up lodging with a Saracen woman. Meanwhile, Martuccio has let it be known that he can help the King of Tunis win the current war. He comes up with an ingenious plan to manufacture arrows with thin string notches which cannot be reused by the enemy, and as a result the King prevails. Martuccio is given wealth and raised to high station . Gostanza hears of this and goes to Tunis where she is united with her lover and returns with him to Italy.

Emilia narrates this tale, one part of which (the motif of using extra fine bow strings) supposedly is based on a real event, according to a chronicle by Giovanni Villani. In Villani's story's Emperor Kassan of the Tartars thus defeated the Sultan of Egypt in 1299.

=== Third tale (V, 3) ===
Pietro Boccamazza elopes from Rome with Agnolella and encounters a gang of robbers who capture him but not the girl. The girl takes refuge in the woods, has a narrow escape from a gang of thugs, and eventually makes her way to Castle Orsini. Pietro escapes from the robbers but a pack of wolves devours his horse. Finally some shepherds bring him to the castle, where the lady of the house observes that, after all their travails, the two deserve a sumptuous wedding, and she arranges for exactly that.

Elissa tells this tale.

=== Fourth tale (V, 4) ===
Messer Lizio da Valbona and his wife have a beautiful daughter, Caterina, late in life and dote upon her. A young man named Ricciardo is a frequent visitor to the house, and falls in love with Caterina, but it is difficult to find a way to be alone with her. Caterina's plan is to complain that her bedroom is too warm and to request that she sleep on the balcony, directly outside her parents bedroom. When they consent to this, Ricciardo climbs up and joins her. Lizio awakens in the morining and finds the two outside his room completely naked with the girl clutching Ricciardo's "nightingale." Lizio insists that the two marry immediately, which they gladly do.

Filostrato narrates this tale, which some claim bears a resemblance to "Lai du Laustic" by the famed late 12th-century poet Marie de France. However, the resemblance is not strong and the story may be of either Boccaccio's invention or may come from oral tradition.

=== Fifth tale (V, 5) ===
A dying friend gives Giacomino da Pavia a young girl named Agnesa to raise as his own. She grows up to be a beautiful maiden, and has two suitors, Giannole and Minghino. They fight over her and both attempt to kidnap her. Giacomino intervenes and tells the story of Agnesa's origin. She was found alone in the ruins of a house that had been destroyed in war, a house that once belonged to a man named Bernabuccio. The man in question is in fact present; he is the father of Giannole and now knows that he is also Agnesa's father! Since Giannole is her brother, this decides the rivalry. Agnesa is given to Minghino to marry.

Neifile tells this story which has no previous literary recording.

=== Sixth tale (V, 6) ===
A young woman called Restituta is kidnapped by pirates who decide to present her as a prize to King Frederick of Sicily. The King has her lodged in one of his houses until he can go to her. Gianni, her lover, traces her whereabouts and enters the house, spending the night with her. They are discovered in the morning and the King announces that both will be stripped naked and burned at the stake. They are brought to the square, where Gianni requests that they be tied facing each other so that they can look into their eyes while they burn. At the last minute, Gianni is recognized by the Admiral of the Fleet who knows that he comes from a family that strongly supports the King. The King frees the two and arranges for them to be honorably married.

Pampinea narrates this tale.

=== Seventh tale (V, 7) ===
Teodoro is sold to Amerigo as a slave while still a child. He is christened and brought up together with Violente, the daughter of his master. The two fall in love and Violente eventually bears a boy. Threatened with death by her outraged father, she names Teodoro, who is sentenced to the gallows. Violante and the child are also condemned to death. Fortunately, traveling Armenian dignitaries recognize the condemned by a strawberry shaped birth mark, and verify that he is in fact an Armenian of high birth who was kidnapped as a child. Thus his life is saved as well as Violente's at the last minute. The couple get the blessing of Amerigo, marry, and live a happy life until old age.

Lauretta narrates.

=== Eighth tale (V, 8) ===
In his love for a young lady of the Traversari family, Nastagio degli Onesti squanders his wealth without being loved in return. He is entreated by his friends to leave the city, and goes away to Chiassi, where he encounters in the woods a female ghost cursed to be hunted down and killed by a horseman and devoured by a pack of hounds every week. He finds out that the cursed lady rejected the horseman just as his own love had rejected him, causing the horseman to take his own life, which resulted in the woman being cursed to continually relive her gruesome death. Nastagio invites his kinfolk and the lady he loves to a banquet at this same place and time, where they observe the ghost woman being torn to pieces. His beloved, fearing a similar fate, accepts Nastagio as her husband.

Filomena's tale may originate from the early 13th century Chronicle of Helinandus. However, the tale was a widespread one and Boccaccio could have taken it from any number of sources or even oral tradition.

=== Ninth tale (V, 9) ===
Federigo degli Alberighi, who loves a wealthy widow called Giovanna but is not loved in return, spends all the money he has in courtship and is left with only a prize falcon. Giovanna comes to see him planning to ask him for the falcon, which she hopes will revive her dying son. Federigo has no way to entertain her properly, so orders that the falcon be killed and prepared as a meal. She eats the meal and learns the truth. Although her son succumbs, she is taken by Federigo's generosity, accepts him as her husband, and makes him rich.

Fiammetta's tale (she is the speaker in this story, contrary to what a couple of incorrect sources may say) is also told about the legendary Hatim Tai, who lived in the 6th century and sacrificed his favorite horse to provide a meal for the ambassador of the Greek Emperor. This earliest version of the tale is of Persian origin.

=== Tenth tale (V, 10) ===
Pietro di Vinciolo, a merchant from Perugia, marries a lustful redhead partly to hide his own homosexuality. Realizing that her husband prefers male company, she consults a wise old woman (described by Boccaccio as similar to Saint Verdiana), who provides her with young lovers. One evening, while Pietro is dining at his friend Ercolano's house, the old lady brings Pietro's wife a new young man. Pietro, however, returns early and explains that, at Ercolano's house, Ercolano's own wife had hidden a lover, and that when Ercolano discovered him, he tried to kill the man in a fit of rage. At that very moment, the donkey in Pietro's stable tramples on the hand of the young man hidden by Pietro's wife, revealing his presence. Pietro, however, who had been pursuing that particular man for a long time, has dinner with both the unfaithful wife and her young lover, ending the evening in bed with both of them, thus satisfying all their desires together.

As is custom among the ten storytellers, Dioneo tells the last and most bawdy tale of the day. This story is taken from Lucius Apuleius's 2nd-century The Golden Ass.

== Sixth day ==
During the sixth day of storytelling, Elissa is queen of the brigata and chooses for the theme stories in which a character avoids attack or embarrassment through a clever remark.

Many stories in the sixth day do not have previous versions and several are more like short anecdotes than developed stories. Boccaccio may have invented some of them himself.

=== First tale (VI, 1) ===
A knight offers to carry Madonna Oretta on horseback and tell her a story, but he tells it in such spurts and stops that she comments on the "jerky ride," causing the storyteller to desist.

Filomena narrates this tale, which many see as revealing Boccaccio's opinion of what makes a good or bad storyteller, just as portions of Hamlet and A Midsummer Night's Dream contain Shakespeare's opinion of what makes a good or bad actor.

=== Second tale (VI, 2) ===
Cisti, a baker, is also known for making the most excellent wine in the city. A nobleman, Messer Geri Spina, asks Cisti to supply a flagon of wine for some visiting papal delegates. But Geri's servant arrives with a huge flagon, hoping to siphon off some of the wine for himself. Cisti refuses, knowing what the servant is doing. Geri figures it out also and sends a smaller flagon. Cisti now supplies Geri with all the wine he wishes.

Pampinea narrates.

=== Third tale (VI, 3) ===
The Bishop of Florence has a friend, Dego, who once paid another man 500 florins to sleep with his wife, but paid in false coin, a humiliation that the whole town knows about. One day the Bishop and Dego encounter a local beauty, Monna Nonna, in the street. The Bishop asks her if she could "conquer" his friend Dego. Monna Nonna replies that, if she did so, she would be sure to be paid in real coin, thus humiliating Dego and the Bishop.

Lauretta narrates.

=== Fourth tale (VI, 4) ===
Chichibio, cook to Currado Gianfigliazzi, avoided a beating with a quick answer. When cooking a crane, a woman he is sweet on asked him for one of the crane's legs, which he gave her. When Currado notices at dinner that a leg is missing, Chichibio states that cranes have only one leg. Currado insists that he prove this, so the next day they find a flock of cranes standing on one leg, but when Currado yells at them they put down their second legs. Chichibo quips that Currado failed to yell at the cooked crane, causing Currado to laugh and forget the matter.

Neifile narrates.

=== Fifth tale (VI, 5) ===
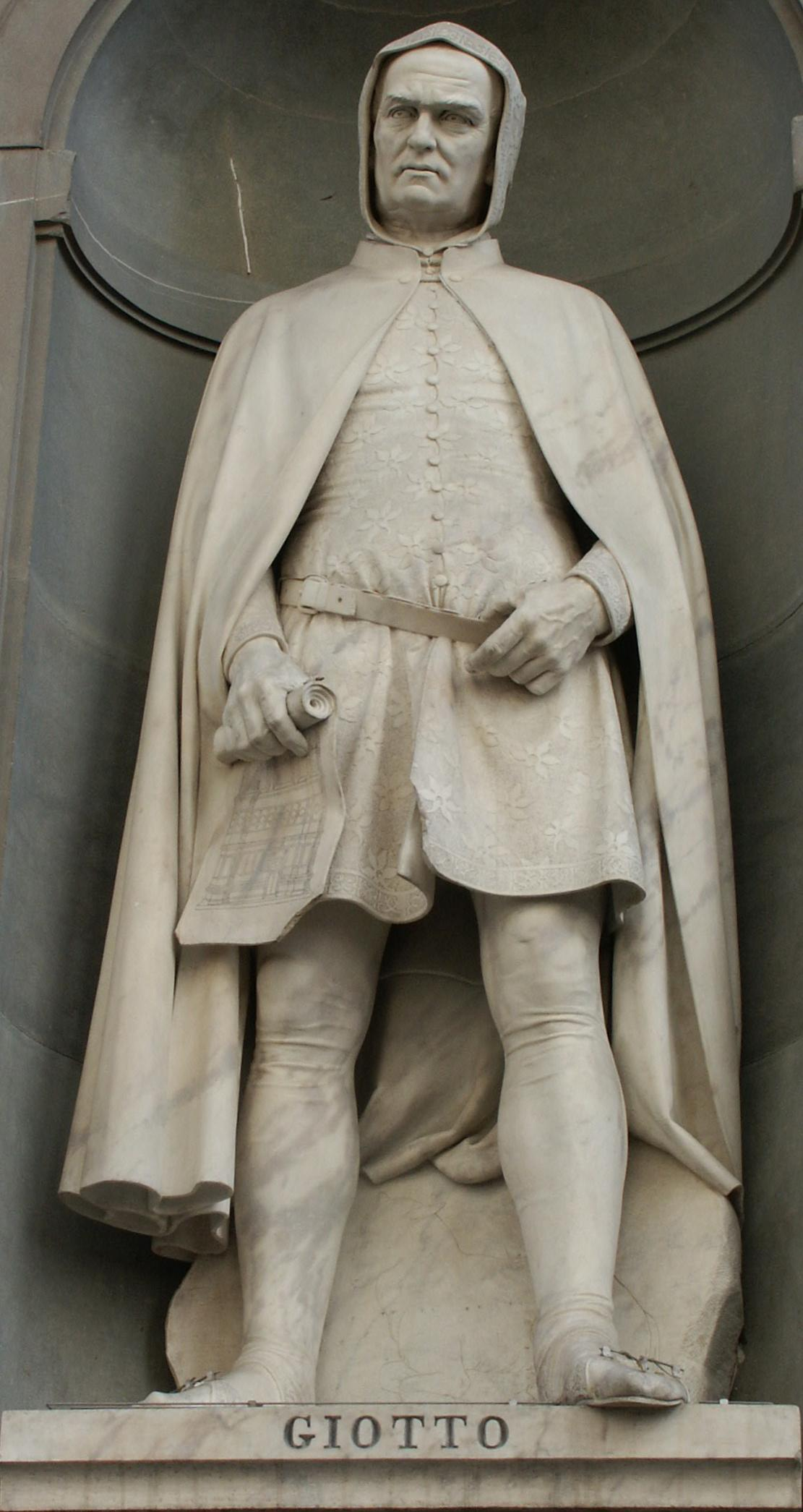
Giotto, subject of tale VI, 5

Messer Forese da Rabatta, a knowledgeable jurist, and Master Giotto, a painter, make fun of each other's poor appearance while returning from Mugello in a rainstorm.

Panfilo narrates this tale.

=== Sixth tale (VI, 6) ===
Michele Scalza wins a wager by proving that the Baronci family is the oldest and most noble in Florence. The proof: the Baronci are so ugly that they must have been some of the first humans God created, before He got the hang of it.

Fiammetta narrates.

=== Seventh tale (VI, 7) ===
Madonna Filippa, being found by her husband with her lover, is cited before the court under a law that makes no distinction between infidelity and prostitution, punishing both by death by burning. During examination, she says that she has never denied her husband's sexual advances, which he confirms. She then asks, since he has gotten as much of her as he desires, what she should do with the surplus. This amuses the court, who acquit her and change the law to distinguish between adultery and prostitution.

Filostrato narrates this tale.

=== Eighth tale (VI, 8) ===
Fresco has a vain and frivolous niece who complains that she has to look at all the ugly people in the town. He advises her not to look at herself in the glass, as she will see a repulsive person if she does.

Emilia narrates. Admonitions against the sin of vanity were common in the medieval era.

=== Ninth tale (VI, 9) ===
Guido Cavalcanti, an intellectual, avoids what he considers the shallow society of Florence. One day while walking through a cemetery he is accosted by some Florentines who ask him why he is so stand-offish. He replies that they can say whatever they want to him in their own house (implying that they are intellectually dead and should reside in a graveyard). The men will avoid teasing Guido in future.

Elissa narrates.

=== Tenth tale (VI, 10) ===
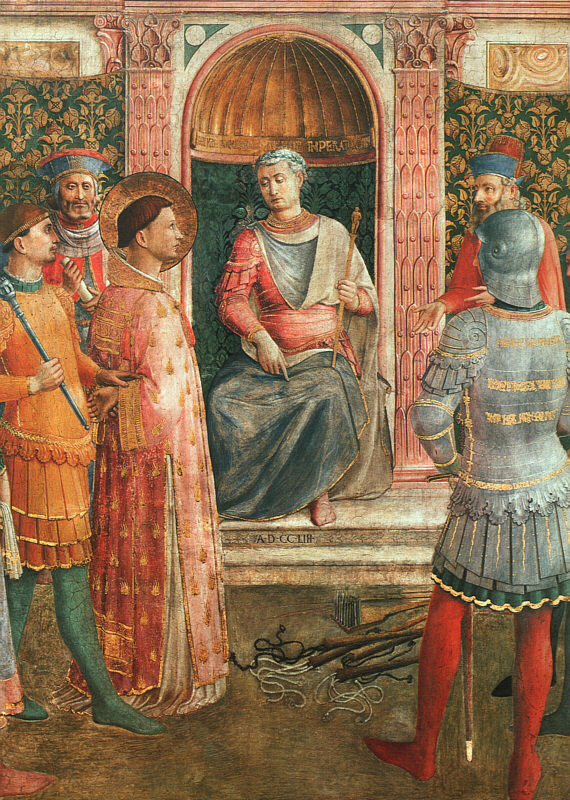
Saint Lawrence on trial. The saint figures in tale VI, 10.

Friar Cipolla makes a lot of money by fiery preaching and the use of relics. He promises at an upcoming service to show a feather of the angel Gabriel. Some men of the town suspect fraud, and break into Guido's lodging, taking the feather and substituting lumps of coal. In the middle of his sermon, Guido opens to box to reveal the sacred feather. Seeing the coals, he thinks fast and declares them to be the coals over which Saint Lawrence was roasted. The sermon is a lucrative success.

Dioneo narrates this story which mocks the worship of relics. The story originates in the Sanskrit collection of stories called Canthamanchari. This story—a classic from the collection—takes place in Certaldo, Boccaccio's hometown (and the location where he would later die). Friar Cipolla's name means "Brother Onion," and Certaldo was famous in that era for its onions. In the story one can sense a certain love on Boccaccio's part for the people of Certaldo, even while he is mocking them.

== Seventh day ==
During the seventh day Dioneo serves as king of the brigata and mandates that the storytelling take place in the secluded and peaceful Valley of the Ladies, which the ladies had discovered the previous day after the storytelling. He sets the theme for the stories: tales in which wives play tricks on their husbands.

=== First tale (VII, 1) ===
Gianni Lotteringhi's wife Monna Tessa has taken a lover, Federigo, and has worked out a system for his visits. There is a donkey skull on a post near the villa. If the skull is pointing toward Florence, it means the coast is clear. One night Tessa has her maid prepare a meal in the garden for Federigo and set the skull in the right direction, but then Gianni returns unexpectedly. Unknowingly, Federigo knocks at the door. Tessa persuades her husband that it is a werewolf, and says a prayer of exorcism which is actually a signal to Federigo to eat his meal and depart.

Emilia tells the first tale of the day. In it Boccaccio states that he heard it from an old woman who claimed it was a true story and heard it as a child. It resembles an earlier French fabliau by Pierre Anfons called "Le revenant". The Italian word, fantasima, sometimes translated as "werewolf", describes a supernatural cat monkey creature or quite simply a ghost.

=== Second tale (VII, 2) ===
Her husband returning home, Peronella quickly hides her lover Gianello in a barrel. The husband has returned home with a buyer for the barrel. Peronella rejoins that she has already sold the barrel - and for a much higher price! The new buyer is currently checking the inside of the barrel. Gianello emerges and states that the barrel is not clean enough The husband bends into the barrel to clean it and Peronella also sticks her head in the barrel to help him, allowing Gianello to take her "like a stallion with a mare."

Filostrato narrates this tale, which Boccaccio certainly took from Apuleius's The Golden Ass, the same source as tale V, 10.

=== Third tale (VII, 3) ===
Friar Rinaldo lies with the mother of his infant godchild. Her husband returns home and finds Rinaldo in the room. They tell him that the friar has just cured the child of a potentially fatal case of worms. The charade is so convincing that the husband commissions a statue in honor of his son's miraculous cure.

Elissa tells this tale, which has so many similar versions in French, Italian, and Latin, that it is impossible to identify one as a potential source for this one. The relationship between a child's godparent and biological parent was considered so sacred at the time that intercourse between them was considered incest. This belief is ridiculed by Boccaccio in a later tale (VII, 10).

=== Fourth tale (VII, 4) ===
Tofano's wife Ghita has taken to cavorting with another man while her husband is drunk at home. One night, Tofono sobers up and wises up, and locks his wife out of the house. Finding that she cannot convince him to let her in, she pretends to throw herself into a well, throwing a large stone into the water. Tofano comes out of the house, and runs to the spot. She runs into the house, locks him out, and hurls abuse at him from within. Eventually they are reconciled, but only on the condition that Ghita will be able to do as she pleases in the future.

Lauretta is the narrator of this very old tale. The earliest form of it is found in the Sanskrit Śukasaptati (The Parrot's Seventy Tales), which was compiled in the 6th century AD. A later version from the 11th century is found in Disciplina Clericalis, which was written in Latin by Petrus Alphonsi, a Jewish convert to Christianity. The tale was very popular and appears in many vernacular languages of the era.

=== Fifth tale (VII, 5) ===
A wife wants to have an affair with her neighbor Filippo, but her jealous husband watches her closely. When she asks to go to the church for confession, the husband becomes suspicious. He disguises himself as a priest, and hears his own wife's confession. She tells him that she loves a priest, who comes to her every night. The husband posts himself at the door the whole night long to watch for the priest, allowing Filippo to come in through a window and spend a passionate night with her. This goes on for some nights until the husband reveals that he was the priest. The wife tells him that her confession was correct - the priest she was talking about was he, her husband. After that, the husband curbs his jealousy, which gives the lovers free rein.

Fiammetta's tale most likely originates from a French fabliau or a possibly Provençal romance, both of which were recorded not too long before the Decameron was written.

=== Sixth tale (VII, 6) ===
Madonna Isabella has taken Leonetto as her lover, but Messer Lambertuccio also covets her. Both men follow her to her country villa. Her husband arrives suddenly and Isabella instructs Lambertuccio to run downstairs with his sword drawn, pretending to pursue someone. When her husband arrives in the bedroom, she introduces Leonetto, who she says is a stranger who has somehow offended Lambertuccio and fears for his life. The husband escorts Leonetto home, and thus never learns the truth.

Pampinea narrates this version of a common medieval tale which originates from the Hitopadesha of India. Later versions pass the tale into Persian, French, Latin (in The Seven Wise Masters), and Hebrew.

=== Seventh tale (VII, 7) ===
A nobleman disguises himself as a servant called Anichino in order to get close to Madonna Beatrice, whom he loves. Egano, the husband, comes to rely completely on Anichino and believes him to be the most faithful of servants. Beatrice and Anichino begin an affair while her husband is away. After his return, one night Beatrice tells her husband that Anichino is making advances to her and at that moment is waiting for her in the garden. If he wants proof, he must disguise himself as his wife and see what Anichino does. The lovers are thus able to cavort for a time, and then Beatrice sends Anichino to the garden with instructions. Anichino starts beating Egano, who is dressed as Beatrice, accusing her of betraying her husband. This charade convinces Egano that both his wife and his servant are good and faithful.

Filomena's humorous tale probably derives from an earlier French fabliau.

=== Eighth tale (VII, 8) ===
Arriguccio grows jealous of his wife Sismonda, and discovers that she has a system for her lover to signal her by pulling on a string attached to her toe at night. When the husband notices the string being pulled, he goes off to chase the lover. The wife brings in her maidservant, and pays her handsomely to get into the bed and accept a beating. Arriguccio comes back and severely beats the maid, who he thinks is his wife. He calls the wife's brothers, but they arrive to find Sismonda unharmed and denying the whole story. The family is furious at Arriguccio and threaten him with harm if more incidents occur. He thus has little choice but to let Sismonda do as she pleases.

Neifile tells this tale. It comes originally from the Pantschatantra and later forms part of other tale collections in Sanskrit, Arabic, French, and Persian. Boccaccio probably used a French version of the tale.

=== Ninth tale (VII, 9) ===
Lydia, wife of Nicostratus, loves a young retainer called Pyrrhus. Pyrrhus asks three things of her, she must kill her husband's favorite hawk, pull out a tuft of his beard, and pull out one of her husband's teeth. By means of persiflage, Lydia accomplishes all three tasks. She then promises Pyrrhus that they will make love in front of her husband without his knowing. In the garden, Pyrrhus climbs a pear tree and claims to see Lydia and Nicostratus having sex before his eyes, when in fact they are not. He claims that this must be an enchanted tree which causes people climbing it to see an illusion of others making love. To verify this, Nicostratus climbs they tree and indeed sees Lydia and Pyrrhus making love before his eyes, but dismisses it as an illusion. Pyrrhus chops down the tree to avoid any future tests, and the two lovers continue their affair.

Panfilo narrates. Boccaccio combined two earlier folk tales into one to create this story. The test of fidelity is previously recorded in French (a fabliau) and Latin (Lidia, an elegiac comedy), but comes originally from India or Persia. The story of the pear tree, best known to English-speaking readers from The Canterbury Tales, also originates from Persia in the Bahar-Danush, in which the husband climbs a date tree instead of a pear tree. The story could have arrived in Europe through the One Thousand and One Nights, or perhaps the version in book VI of the Masnavi by Rumi.

=== Tenth tale (VII, 10) ===
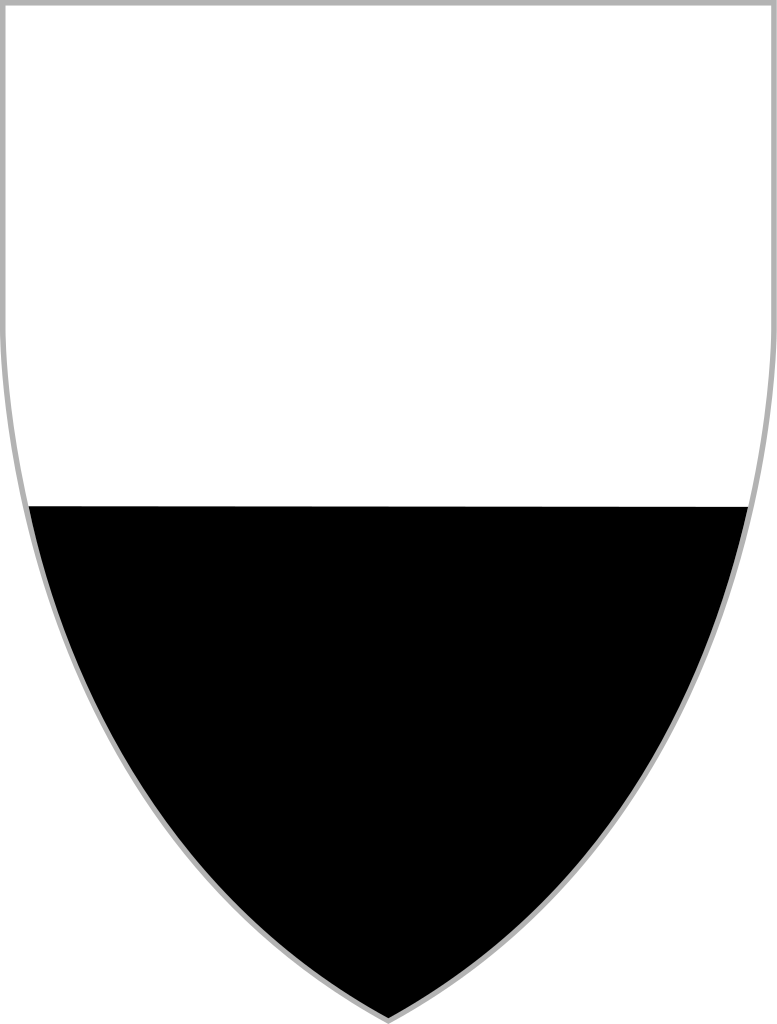
The coat of arms of Siena, the setting of VII, 10. Boccaccio often portrays the Sienese negatively.

Two Sienese men, Tingoccio and Meuccio, make a pact to come back from the dead and inform the survivor about the afterlife. Tingoccio has an affair with a lady who happens to be the mother of his godson. Tingoccio dies, and true to his promise, appears to Meuccio. He reveals himself to be in purgatory being punished for a variety of sins. Meuccio asks what punishment he is receiving for having slept with the mother of his godson, and Tingoccio replies that this is not considered a sin. Meuccio regrets the fact that in the past he has passed up opportunities to sleep with the mothers of his godchildren, thinking incorrectly that this was a deadly sin.

As usual, Dioneo narrates the last tale of the day. See the commentary for VII, 3 for information about the relation between a child's parent and godparent.

== Eighth day ==
Lauretta reigns during the eighth day of storytelling. During this day the members of the group tell stories of tricks women play on men or that men play on women.

=== First tale (VIII, 1) ===
Guasparruolo's wife tells Gulfardo that if he wants to sleep with her he must pay her 200 florins. Gulfardo agrees, sleeps with her, and pays her, but decides to teach her a lesson. As it happens, Gulfardo owes 200 florins to her husband Guasparruolo. In Guasparruolo's presence, Gulfardo mentions that he has paid off his debt by giving the cash to his wife. The wife has no choice but to turn over the money, thus clearing Gulfardo's debt and losing her own payment.

Neifile narrates. This tale (and the next one) comes from a 13th-century French fabliau by Eustache d'Amiens. English speakers know it best from Chaucer's "The Shipman's Tale". Chaucer borrowed from the same fabliau as Boccaccio did.

=== Second tale (VIII, 2) ===
The priest of Varlungo lies with Monna Belcolore, but she demands five pounds from him. He leaves with her his cloak by way of pledge, but arranges to steal from her a mortar and pestle, hoping to use these to get his cloak back. The wife returns the cloak, but tells the priest that he will no longer be putting his pestle into her mortar.

Panfilo tells this story, which can be considered a variation of VIII, 1.

=== Third tale (VIII, 3) ===
Bruno and Buffalmacco convince Calandrino that a certain black stone, a heliotrope (bloodstone), found in the Mugnone will convey the power of invisibility. While Calendrino collects the stones, his companions fool him into thinking he is now invisible. Arriving home laden with stones, his wife Tessa chides him. Calendrino beats her, believing that she has broken the spell and made the stones worthless.

Elissa narrates this tale, the first in which Bruno and Buffalmacco appear. The two were early Renaissance Italian painters. However, both are known far better for their love of practical jokes than for their artistic work. Boccaccio probably invented this tale himself, though, and used well known jokers as characters.

=== Fourth tale (VIII, 4) ===
A priest of Fiesole is enamored of a widow lady, who is not interested. His pestering becomes insupportable, so she decides to trick him. Telling him that she will give in to his entreaties, she invites him to come into her bed in the dark. Then she bribes one of her maids, an old and unattractive woman, to take her place. Her brothers bring the Bishop around, who sees what is going on. The priest is punished by the Bishop and becomes a laughing stock in the town.

Emilia's tale originates from the fabliau "Le Prestre et Alison" by Guillaume Le Normand.

=== Fifth tale (VIII, 5) ===
Renaissance illustration of VIII, 5

A newly appointed judge of rough origin is thoroughly disliked by the townspeople. Three young men decide to humiliate him, so they sneak below the bench and pull down his breeches while he is administering justice.

Filostrato narrates.

=== Sixth tale (VIII, 6) ===
Bruno and Buffalmacco steal a pig from Calandrino. They also decide to tease him about it, so they induce him to use a magical truth test involving ginger sweets. The thief, they claim, will not be able to swallow the sweets. Through subterfuge, Calandrino is given sweets infused with bitter root and is thus unable to swallow them, revealing himself to be the thief of his own pig! Bruno and Buffalmacco threaten to tell Calandrino's wife, but he buys them off with some capons.

Filomena narrates. Just like Bruno and Buffalmacco, Calandrino was also in reality a 14th-century Italian Renaissance painter. However, Calandrino was known as a simpleton by his contemporaries. It is possible that this tale may be true and Boccaccio recorded it first. The test that Bruno and Buffalmacco submit Calandrino to was really a medieval lie detector test and the tale is consistent with what we know about the characters of the three painters.

=== Seventh tale (VIII, 7) ===
A scholar named Rineri loves a widow lady, Elena. Hoping to discourage his advances, she invites him to her house but makes him wait all night in the freezing cold while she cavorts with her favored lover. Months later, in high summer, Rineri has his chance for revenge when Elena approaches him for help in getting back her lover, who has deserted her. By means of what he says is an elaborate magic ritual, he lures her to the roof of a remote tower where he makes her stand naked for a whole day, exposed to the flies and the sun. She takes months to recover and vows to stay away from men in future.

Pampinea tells this story of revenge over spurned love, which has many common analogues in many languages in antiquity, the Middle Ages, the Renaissance, and early modern periods.

=== Eighth tale (VIII, 8) ===
Spinelloccio and Zeppa are friends until Spinelloccio lies with Zeppa's wife. Zeppa calls out his wife and says that to atone she must help him punish Spinelloccio. When Spinelloccio arrives for another tryst, Zeppa and his wife lock him in a trunk. Zeppa than goes to Spinelloccio's wife and explains that, for both of them to get revenge, she must lie with him. So Zeppa and Spinelloccio's wife have sex lying on top of the barrel where Spinelloccio is imprisoned. They all enjoy the experience so much, that they agree to hold both their wives in common for the future.

Fiammetta narrates this tale. Like many of the eighth day it has a theme in common with many tales from the ancient and medieval era and it is not possible to point to one source that served as Boccaccio's inspiration.

=== Ninth tale (VIII, 9) ===
Bruno and Buffalmacco play a nasty practical joke on Master Simone, a physician. They claim to be members of a secret society where they are wined and dined and enjoy the favors of beautiful women nightly. Simone is eager to be accepted as a member, and gives sumptuous meals and gifts to the two tricksters. Finally they agree to bring him to a meeting of the society, but instead take him out into the countryside and throw him in a cesspit. The two also manage to come up with a story such that Simone does not suspect their treachery.

Lauretta narrates another tale about Bruno and Buffalmacco and their practical jokes. This story is probably just a vehicle for Boccaccio's ability to coin word play, just as tale VI, 10 did. The tale is filled with scatological puns.

=== Tenth tale (VIII, 10) ===
A merchant, Salabaetto, takes up with a cunning Sicilian woman, Jancofiore, who entreats him to loan her 500 florins, the entire value of his stock. She then cuts him out and does not repay the loan. Salabaetto goes to Naples, where a friend offers to help him plan revenge. Returning to Palermo, Salabaetto gives it to be known that he is bringing 5000 florins worth of merchandise. Jancofiore, sensing a bigger pay day, decides to get back in Salabaetto's graces by repaying him the 500. Salabaetto then tells her that he needs another 1000 to ransom his goods from pirates. She can hold the key to his warehouse as collateral. Jancofiore decides that it is worth the investment of 1000, since she can always sell the merchandise for more. However, after Salabaetto sails away with the 1500 florins, she goes to check the warehouse and discovers it full of worthless or low cost items.

The story that Dioneo tells is found in Alphonsus's Disciplina Clericalis and the Gesta Romanorum, both of which are written in Latin.

== Ninth day ==
Emilia is queen of the brigata for the ninth day. For the second time there is no prescribed theme for the stories of the day (the only other time was during the first day).

=== First tale (IX, 1) ===
Madonna Francesca, having two suitors, Rinuccio and Alessandro, and loving neither of them, comes up with a plan to be rid of them. She induces one to pretend to be a corpse in a tomb, and the other to enter the tomb to fetch him out. The caper fails when the two men are accosted by the night watch. Since neither has satisfied her wishes, she artfully rids herself of both.

Filomena narrates.

=== Second tale (IX, 2) ===
An abbess rises in haste and in the dark, with intent to surprise an accused nun in bed with her lover. Thinking to put on her veil, she accidentally puts on instead the breeches of a priest who was in bed with her. While the abbess is furiously lecturing her, the young nun points out the breeches, revealing the abbess's hypocrisy. The abbess then changes her tune and avers that nuns need the pleasure of male company just as any other women. After that, all the nuns find it easier to meet with their lovers.

Elissa is the narrator of this tale which was either taken from a fabliau by Jean de Condé written between 1313 and 1337, or from a story about Saint Jerome in The Golden Legend, written about 1260. The former was the more likely source for Boccaccio.

=== Third tale (IX, 3) ===
Bruno and Buffalmacco plan to cheat Calandrino out of a small inheritance. They make Calandrino believe that he is becoming ill, and solicit the physician Simone to examine him. Simone declares that Calandrino is pregnant, which Calandrino attributes to his wife always wanting to be on top during sex. Calandrino uses his inheritance to purchase various remedies and potions and, when the money is gone, is "cured" of his pregnancy.

Filostrato narrates this humorous story.

=== Fourth tale (IX, 4) ===
Angiulieri travels to the court of a high-ranking clergyman in hopes of securing employment. He is accompanied by Fortarrigo, even though the latter is known as a gambler and drunkard. Fortarrigo soon loses all of both men's money and most of their clothing at the gambling tables. Fortarrigo lies by claiming that it was his companion who robbed him and is believed by some locals, who beat up Angiulieri and give his remaining belongings to the other. Neifile assures us that Angiulieri will have his revenge at some future time.

Neifile is the narrator of this tale.

=== Fifth tale (IX, 5) ===
While on a house decorating job, Calandrino falls in love with Niccolosa, the wife of the master of the house. Bruno, Buffalmacco, Nello and Niccolosa all conspire to make a fool out of Calendrino. Niccolosa pretends to be enamored of Cadandrino, causing him to follow her around like a puppy dog for weeks. Near the end of the job, Bruno gives Calandrino a parchment scroll, supposedly enchanted so that, if he touches Niccolosa with it, she will do anything he says. The conspirators inform Calandrino's wife Tessa, who comes to the house and catches Niccolosa feigning lovemaking with her husband. The furious Tessa will make Calandrino's life miserable for some time to come.

Fiammetta tells this story.

=== Sixth tale (IX, 6) ===
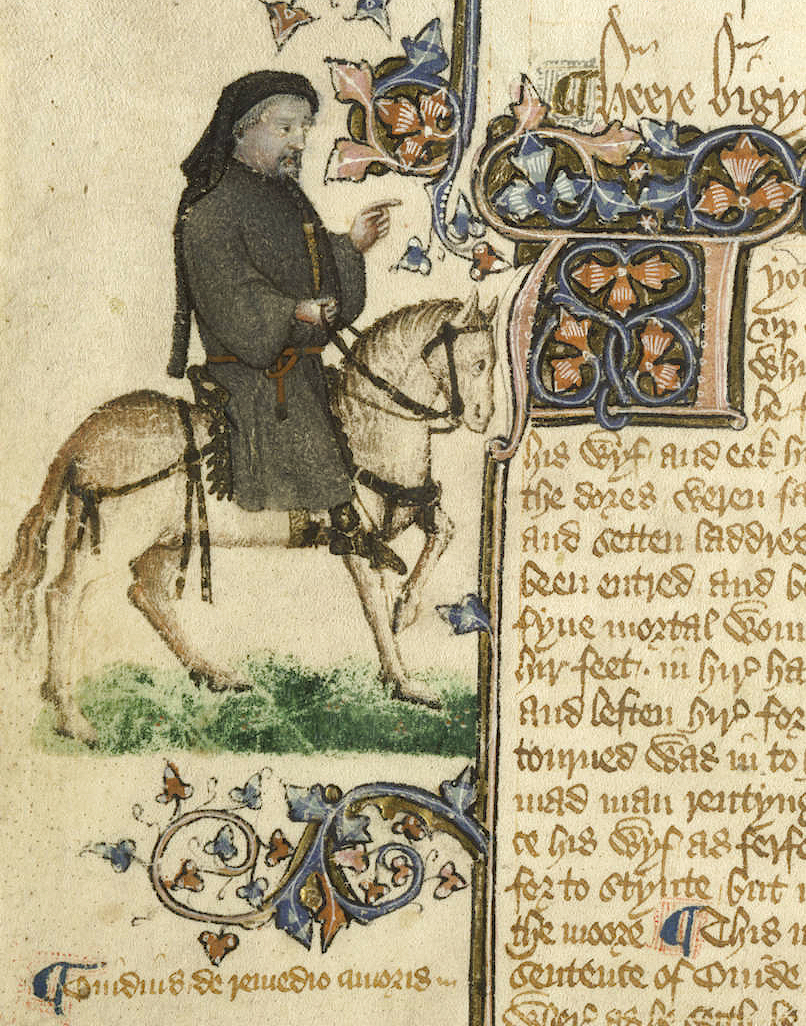
Geoffrey Chaucer, whose Canterbury Tales shares many sources with various Decameron tales, including IX, 6

Pinuccio falls in love with young Niccolosa, and winds up lodging with her family along with a friend, Adriano. Niccolosa, her parents, and the two men are all sleeping in the same room. In the dark, a comedy of bed-hopping ensues, with Pinuccio getting his way with Niccolosa, and Adriano lucking out with the mother. When the father's suspicions are aroused, the mother protects her own and her daughter's reputations, and the men claim to be sleepwalkers, thus getting away with it.

Panfilo's tale comes from Jean Bodel's fabliau "Gombert et les deus Clers", a story also used by Chaucer for The Reeve's Tale.

=== Seventh tale (IX, 7) ===
Talano di Molese is married to a beautiful but petulant wife. He dreams that a wolf tears the neck and face of his wife, and warns her to avoid the woods that day. The wife won't listen to her husband's advice, suspecting him of planning to meet another woman in the woods. So she goes to the wood and indeed is attacked by wolves who destroy her beauty with their claws.

Pampinea narrates this tale, for which no known earlier source exists. She suggests as a moral that wives should heed their husbands.

=== Eighth tale (IX, 8) ===
Biondello and Ciacco both live a wealthier life than they can afford, which makes them rivals. Biondello decides to trick Ciacco by making him miss a sumptuous meal. Ciacco is avenged on Biondello when he slanders Biondello to wine merchant Filippo Argenti, who beats him. They finally come to a truce.

Lauretta is narrator.

=== Ninth tale (IX, 9) ===
Two young men ask counsel of Solomon; the one, how he is to make himself beloved, the other, how he is to control an unruly wife. The King bids the first to love, and the other to go to the Bridge of Geese. The first man starts loving others and finds true love in return. The second man observes a mule train crossing the bridge and sees that by beating a stubborn mule, the herder persuades it to cross the bridge. Upon returning home, he employs the same tactics on his wife; beating her senseless when she refuses to make what he wants for dinner. He wakes the next day to a hot breakfast and returns home that evening to his favorite meal. It appears he has cured his wife of her stubbornness.

Emilia narrates this tale, which probably originated in Asia.

=== Tenth tale (IX, 10) ===
Father Gianni is lodging at the modest home of his friend Pietro, and can only be accommodated in the stable, sleeping next to a mare. Gianni says he doesn't mind because he knows a spell he can use to turn the mare into a beautiful woman. Pietro's wife Gemmata suggests that the same spell could be used to turn Gemmata into a mare, in which case she and her husband could bring more goods to market. Seeing his opportunity, Gianni tells Gemmata to undress, places her on all fours, and begins caressing her. He then announces that it is time to attach the tail, and penetrates her. Too late, Pietro shouts that he does not want his wife to have a tail. Gianni declares that this interjection has broken the spell and Gemmata will not be transformed.

Dioneo's bawdy story derives from a French fabliau, "De la demoiselle qui vouloit voler en l'air."

== Tenth day ==
Panfilo is the king of the last day of storytelling and he orders the company to tell stories about deeds of generosity. These tales seem to escalate in their degrees of munificence until the end, where the day (and the entire Decameron) reaches an apex in the story of patient Griselda.

=== First tale (X, 1) ===
A knight in the service of the King of Spain feels himself ill rewarded by the King and departs, comparing the King to a mule that urinates in its own drinking water. The King calls him back and declares that it is not stinginess but fate that has delayed the knight's reward. As proof he offers two chests, one filled with treasure and one with dirt. The knight chooses the one that happens to be filled with dirt, proving that it is only his bad luck that has kept him from reward. The King nevertheless bestows treasures upon the knight for his good service.

Neifile's story is one of the most widely known in the collection. Its origins come from two different stories. The first part (the comparison of the king to a mule) comes from Busone de'Raffaelli da Gubbio's Fortunatus Siculus, written about 1333 in Italian. The second part (concerning the caskets, known to English speakers from Shakespeare's The Merchant of Venice) originates from about 800 AD from Joannes Damascensus's account of Barlaam and Josaphat and was written in Greek. Boccaccio most likely was inspired, though, by the Gesta Romanorum.

=== Second tale (X, 2) ===
Ghino di Tacco, a celebrated bandit, captures the Abbot of Cluny, who turns out to be suffering from a stomach ailment. Through rest and diet, Ghino manages to cure the Abbot of his malady. The grateful Abbot gifts Ghino most of the possessions he was carrying, and upon return to Rome reconciles Ghino with Pope Boniface, who appoints Ghino to the Knights Hospitaller.

Elissa narrates. Ghino di Tacco is the Italian equivalent of the English Robin Hood, with the difference that di Tacco was a real person whose deeds as a chief of a band of robbers passed into legend. He lived in the latter half of the 13th century. Boccaccio's tale, though, is one of many legends that grew up around him.

=== Third tale (X, 3) ===
Nathan, an elderly rich man of Cathay, is noted for his exceeding generosity towards the guests of his house and to traveling strangers. Mithridanes, a wealthy young man living not far from Nathan, attempts to emulate him, but is frustrated and instead resolves to kill him. Nathan, in simple costume, meets Mithridanes on the road and befriends him to the point that Mithridanes reveals his intention to kill Nathan. The disguised Nathan advises Mithridanes where and how to carry out the deed. Following Nathan's advice, Mitridanes finds the older gentleman in a copse, and recognizing him, is shame-stricken, and becomes his friend.

Filostrato tells this tale. He attributes it to "various Genoese", but this may be seen as a reluctance to credit Marco Polo (as a Venetian an enemy of Florence and greatly disdained by Boccaccio personally); although no specific tale resembling this one appears in Polo's writings, his reports of Kublai Khan's generosity are likely the inspiration for the tale.

=== Fourth tale (X, 4) ===
Messer Gentile de' Carisendi, from Modena, disinters a lady that he loves from her tomb to see her one more time. She, who had been prematurely interred, awakens and gives birth to a male child. Gentile and his mother restore the woman to health. Gentile then gives her and her son to Niccoluccio Caccianimico, her husband, and is praised for his honorable behavior.

Lauretta gives this story, for which there is no clear surviving source. The story is a bit similar to the Florentine legend of Ginevra degli Amieri, set in the last decade of the 14th century, but published no earlier than at the turn of the 16th century.

=== Fifth tale (X, 5) ===
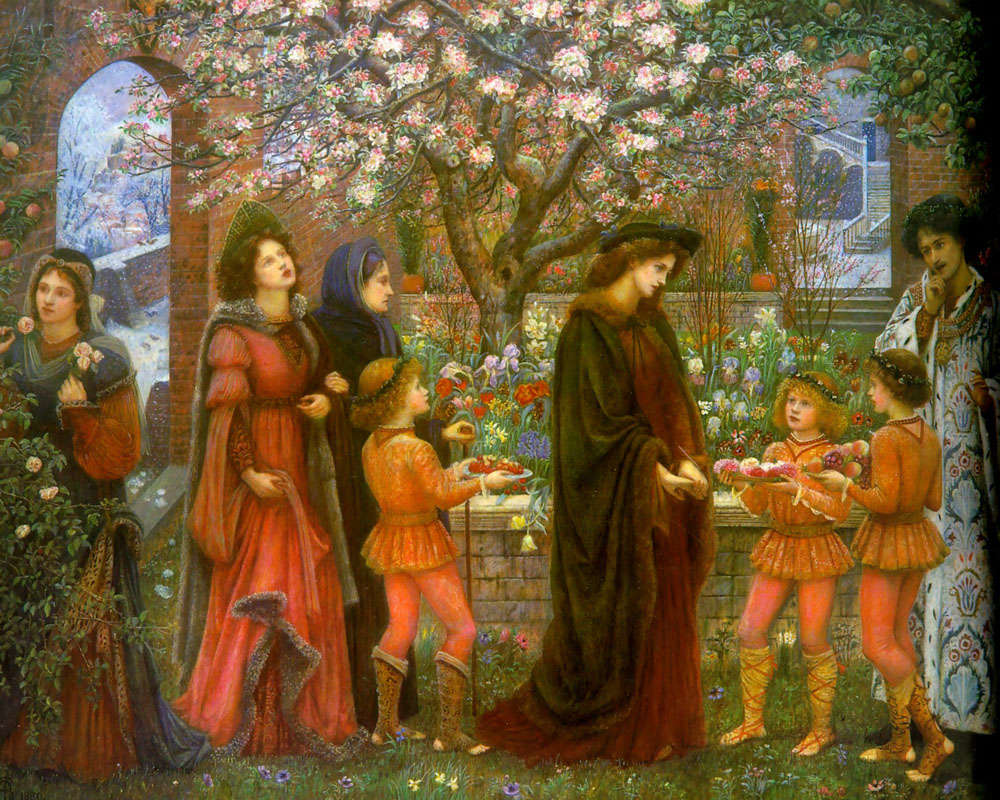
The Enchanted Garden of Messer Ansaldo by Marie Spartali Stillman

Messer Ansaldo is in love with Madonna Dianora, a married woman, and often sends her messages of his love. She does not return his affections, and in an attempt to put him off says that she will only be his if he can prove his love by providing for her a garden as fair in January as it is in May. Ansaldo hires for a great sum a necromancer, and thereby gives her the garden. Madonna Dianora tells her husband of her promise, and he says that, while he would prefer that she remain faithful to him if possible, she must keep her word to Ansaldo. When Ansaldo learns of this, he releases her from her promise and she returns to her husband. From then on Ansaldo feels only honorable affection for Madonna Dianora. The necromancer is impressed by this and refuses to take any payment from Ansaldo.

Emilia narrates. This tale is found in later manuscripts of the Śukasaptati. It is found in several story collections from Asia and in many languages.

=== Sixth tale (X, 6) ===
Charles I "the Old", King of Naples, falls in love with a young noble maiden whom he meets while being lavishly entertained by a nobleman of a recently conquered province. Soon afterward, he grows ashamed of his folly and arranges for her and her sister to be honorably married to men of their own age and station.

Fiammetta narrates.

=== Seventh tale (X, 7) ===
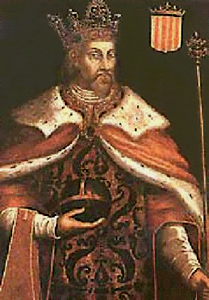
King Peter III of Aragon (1239–1285)

King Pedro is told of the fervent love borne him by Lisa Puccini, which has caused her to fall ill and to contemplate suicide. The king summons Lisa, comforts her, and gives her in marriage to a young gentleman. Having kissed her on the brow, the king professes himself her knight ever after and promises to ensure that she and her husband will prosper.

Pampinea tells this tale. No earlier versions are known, although there may have been a folk tale based on the adventures of Macalda di Scaletta with King Pedro.

=== Eighth tale (X, 8) ===
This tale is set in Athens and Rome in the time of Augustus. In Athens, Sophronia is betrothed to Gisippus, but Titus the Roman falls in love with her at sight. Both men are distressed by this threat to their close friendship, and after much discussion Gisippus agrees to relinquish his claim to her in favor of his friend's greater love. They trick Sophronia into giving her virginity to Titus rather than Gisippus. By means of both rhetoric and threats, Titus convinces Sophronia's family to accept the change in marriage plans and the couple departs for Rome. Some time later, Gisippus is exiled from Athens. He arrives in Rome in poverty and wrongly believes himself to be scorned by Titus. Gisippus decides to abandon his life and thus confesses falsely to a murder. Titus recognizes him, and to save his life, avers that he was the true killer. In the end the real murderer confesses, saving both of the friends. Titus gives Gisippus his sister to wife, and shares with him all his wealth.

Filomena narrates this lengthy story, which Boccaccio may have taken from Alphonsus's Disciplina clericalis. However, its ultimate source is from the East, although there are disputes as to exactly where or when.

=== Ninth tale (X, 9) ===
Saladin, the Sultan, in guise of a merchant, is lavishly entertained by Torello. Leaving for the Crusade, Torello fixes a date after which his wife may marry again if he does not return. He is taken prisoner by Saladin's armies, and by his skill in training hawks comes to Saladin's notice. Saladin recognizes him, and treats him with all honor. Torello tells Saladin that he will lose his wife if he does not return immediately, so Saladin arranges for a sorcerer to transport him in a single night back to his home of Pavia. Torello attends a banquet just ahead of the wedding ceremony and is recognized by his wife in time to stop the ceremony and return home with her.

Panfilo is the narrator of this tale.

=== Tenth tale (X, 10) ===
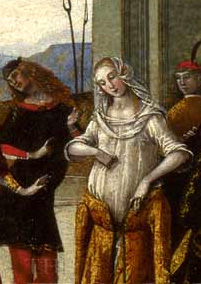
Detail from The Story of Patient Griselda, painted c. 1500

The Marquis of Saluzzo, Gualtieri, responding to the entreaties of his vassals, consents to take a wife. Wanting to please only himself in the choice of her, he takes Griselda, the comely daughter of a local peasant. He has two children by her, but then conceives of an elaborate, multi-year plan to test whether his wife is worthy of him. First he sends both children away in a manner that causes Griselda to believe that they have been put to death. Later, feigning to find her unworthy of him, and wanting to take another wife, he turns her out of doors in only her chemise. In all of this, Griselda responds humbly that her husband's wishes are paramount. Finally, he brings Griselda back as a housekeeper and introduces their now grown daughter as his new bride. Finding her patient and accepting even of this insult, Gualtieri relents and accepts Griselda again as his wife and introduces her to her two children. She is now honored in the eyes of all, and the couple leads a happy life.

Dioneo tells the final (and possibly most retold) story of the Decameron. Although Boccaccio was the first to record the story, he almost certainly did not invent it. Petrarch mentions having heard it many years before, but not from Boccaccio. Therefore, it was probably already circulating in oral tradition when the Decameron was written. Petrarch later retold the story in Latin, which is probably the biggest factor that contributed to its huge popularity in subsequent centuries.

== Conclusion ==
In the end, Panfilo suggests that they refrain from appointing a successor monarch, but instead return to Florence, which the ten agree to do the next day. No mention is made of whether the plague has abated in the fifteen days that they have been away. Panfilo also observes that the ten have followed the highest standards of conduct and morality during their sojourn, despite the suggestive nature of some of the tales they have been telling.

In conclusion, Boccaccio, defends his work against detractors, mentioning that some find the tales too sexually suggestive and others find some of them too long, although he avers that ladies of leisure, for whom the book was primarily written, have ample time to enjoy lengthy stories. He also suggests that those who object to portions of the work should simply refrain from reading those portions. He takes a few more sarcastic shots at the venal clergy, but also thanks the Lord for giving him the talent and stamina to complete this heroic work.

== See also ==
- Allegory in the Middle Ages
