= Three Girls =

Three Girls may refer to:

- De tribus puellis or The Three Girls, an anonymous medieval Latin poem
- Three girls movie or three girls in the city movies, a film genre featuring three (sometimes four) girls
- Three Girls (painting), a 1935 painting by Amrita Sher-Gil
- Three Girls (TV series), a 2017 British TV drama series

== See also ==
- Take Three Girls, a 1969–1971 BBC TV series
