= Comoedia Lydiae =

The Comoedia Lydiae (or Lidia) is a medieval Latin elegiac comedy from the late twelfth century. The "argument" at the beginning of the play refers to it as the Lidiades (line 3, a play on Heroides), which the manuscripts gloss as comedia de Lidia facta (a comedy made about Lidia) and which its English translator gives as Adventures of Lidia.

Lidia was long ascribed to Matthieu de Vendôme, but in 1924 Edmond Faral, in his study of Latin "fabliaux", discounted this hypothesis. More recently, scholars have argued in favour of the authorship of the cleric Arnulf of Orléans, which now seems secure. The play was probably composed sometime shortly after 1175.

Compared with the other elegiac comedies, Lidia is not as dependent on Ovid. It is dark and cynical in its view of human nature, even misogynistic. Lidia, the title character, is portrayed as a complete brute, sexually mischievous, faithless, cruel, and completely self-centred. Arnulf is explicit when he claims that Lidia is just a typical woman (line 37).

In style, Lidia is highly rhetorical. Bruno Roy called it "the apotheosis of the pun". Lidia's name is often punned with ludus (game) and ludere (play), often with connotations of deception or sexual activity. Women are the virus that destroys virum (man, virility). Lidia would be unsatisfied even with ten (decem) men, a pun on her husband's name, Decius. The puns, though fashionable in the late twelfth century, make elegance in translation very difficult.

Lidia is preserved in two fourteenth-century manuscripts. One of them may have been copied by the hand of Giovanni Boccaccio. Regardless, he certainly borrowed the tale for his Decameron, 7.9. His major alteration was the name of Lidia's husband, changed from Decius to Nicostrato. Geoffrey Chaucer also borrowed aspects of Lidia for "The Merchant's Tale", one of The Canterbury Tales.

== Story ==
The comedy is divided into three parts: a short "argument" explaining the nature and purpose of the work, a brief prologue laying out the characters and the situation, and the story itself. In the argument Arnulf claims that he is writing to improve upon his previous comedy about "the sportive knight", Miles gloriosus. He has depicted "all female wiles worthy of note" so that you "may flee forewarned: after all, you too may have a Lidia in your life" (lines 5–6). A moralistic or didactic purpose was often given in the Middle Ages to justify the production of eroticised or sexualised literature.

The prologue begins with a pun on one of the main characters, Pyrrhus, the loyal knight of Lidia's husband, the duke Decius, and the Latin word for pear tree, pirus. The pun is accommodated in English by use of "Pearus" for "Pyrrhus". A pear was a common phallic symbol from antiquity to the Middle Ages. The dramatist is poking fun at Pyrrhus when he refers to "the pears fallen from the pear tree" (line 8). The references to the "jealous one" in the prologue are probably a reference to Matthieu de Vendôme and his rivalry with Arnulf.

The tale begins by describing Lidia's dissatisfaction with her marriage. She is enamored of Pearus and whenever he passes she pretends to faint, his name gets stuck in her throat (which, given its phallic symbolism, is an innuendo for oral sex), and when she lies in her bed alone she is pleased that Decius is away. She then concocts a plan to test Pearus. She sends her elderly messenger Lusca (the one-eyed) to tell Pearus how she dies for him, would willingly give herself to him, and is unfaithful to her husband. Shocked, Pearus rationalises that it is a test of his loyalty planned by his master, Decius, and proclaims that just as Lidia is loyal to the duke, so is Pearus.

What follows is a diatribe from Lusca on the evil of women, the promiscuity of Lidia, and the decline of the state of marriage. She decides, however, that her interests are best served by Lidia's continued infidelity, since a disloyal wife is freer with her husband's wealth. When Lusca approaches Pearus a second time, the knight is moved by the story of Hippolytus to test Lusca's allegation that Decius is a fool whom Lidia controls and deceives at will. He devises three tests for Lidia: she must kill the duke's prized falcon to prove she can deceive him, she must pluck five hairs from his beard, and she must extract one of his teeth. Each of these tests is a test of virility, since the falcon, the beard, and the tooth could all be symbols for male sexuality in the Middle Ages.

In the following scene, Lusca relays Pearus' challenge to Lidia. Lidia, dressed "sumptuously", then brazenly enters the noisy hall where Decius is holding court, makes an impassioned speech accusing Decius of preferring the hunting grounds to her bedchamber, and grabbing the falcon from its perch, wrings its neck in front of all. Then, laughing, she nuzzles up to Decius and plucks five hairs from his beard, claiming that they were white, making him appear older than he was.

The ruse to take Decius' tooth takes days of planning. Lidia eventually has the youthful cupbearers turn their heads to the side as they serve the wine, in the belief that they have bad breath. Then, at the banquet, she loudly proclaims that they turn aside because Decius has bad breath. Pearus is then summoned to help remove the duke's offending bad tooth. Amazed, Pearus then concedes to Lidia's newest wish: to be caught "in flagrante delicto" by the duke.

The plan is simple. Lidia feigns illness and the four named characters make a trip to a garden to help relieve her. When they arrive at a pear tree, Decius sends Pearus up it to fetch some fruit. While in the tree the knight, feigning modesty, pretends that he can see the duke and Lidia in the act of intercourse. Lidia explains that it is an illusion caused by the height. Decius and Pearus promptly switch places to test the illusion. While Pearus and Lidia have sex, the duke believes he is being tricked by the pear tree. When he climbs down, he orders the tree cut down, at Lidia's request, so that it will not deceive others.
