= Novellino =

Novellino may refer to:

- Il Novellino, an anonymous collection of short stories from 13th-century Tuscany
- Il Novellino, a collection of short stories by Masuccio Salernitano, a 15th-century Italian poet
- Augusto Novelli (1867–1927), Italian journalist, dramatist and writer, also known as Novellino
- Walter Novellino (born 1953), Italian football player and team manager
