= Arnulf of Orléans =

Arnulf of Orléans may refer to:

- Arnulf (bishop of Orléans), bishop from 970 until 1003
- Arnulf of Orléans (12th century), Latinist and poet
