= Babio =

12th-century elegiac comedy

Babio in Latin is a 12th-century elegiac comedy consisting of 484 lines of elegiac distichs, the author and origin are unknown. It imitates Roman comedy and is indebted to Ovid, Plautus and Terence. It is preserved in five manuscripts, four of them in England and one in Berlin (Babio).

It is written in dialogue form, suggesting that it may have been written as a drama. The main character, Babio, who is elderly and married, develops an unrequited passion for his step-daughter, Viola, who is already involved with a local lord, Croceus. Meanwhile, Babio's wife, Petula, is having a secret affair with a servant, Fodius. Much of the action is devoted to Babio's attempts to break up this affair (while still pursuing Viola) and the efforts of the pair to evade him.

== Editions ==
- Edmond Faral (1948)
- M. M. Brennan, Charleston (1969).

== See also ==
- Medieval theatre
- Medieval Latin comedy
