= Vitalis of Blois =

12th-century cleric and dramatist

Vitalis of Blois was a 12th-century cleric and Latin dramatist. He wrote two elegiac comedies, Geta and Aulularia, both adaptations of Plautus. The internal evidence of his plays shows him to have been highly educated. His writing can be dated to 1150–1160 at the earliest. The earliest manuscripts date from later in the century. His surname appears in the Latin sources as Blexus, Blesis or Blesensis, indicating an association with Blois. References to Plato in his work suggest a connection with the school of Chartres, where Plato was much admired at the time.

Vitalis own ideas on his work are found in his prologues. In the first, the prologue to Geta, he does not name himself nor his source, Plautus' Amphitryon. He defends modernizing the ancients and criticizes his contemporaries who cannot appreciate new works. In the prologue to Aulularia (based on Plautus' Aulularia), he credits both himself and his source. He begins by claiming "I'm only following Plautus", progresses to viewing the work as either "mine or Plautus'", and ends by asserting that "that which was Plautus' is now mine"—which is nonetheless to Plautus' benefit, since he "curtailed Plautus, and he is enriched by the loss" and his "writings earn applause for Plautus".
