= Geta (comedy) =

Elegiac comedy by Vitalis of Blois

Prologue of Geta in a 13th-century manuscript

Geta, a twelfth-century elegiac comedy by Vitalis of Blois, is a loose adaptation of Plautus’ play, Amphitryon. Both tell the story of how Jupiter, transforming himself to look like Amphitryon, sleeps with Amphitryon’s wife, Alcmena. But in Geta, Amphitryon is not a Greek military leader but a philosopher, and Hercules, the child who is born from the union of the god and Alcmena, is not even mentioned. In both stories, Amphitryon’s servant, who is sent on ahead to his master’s estate to announce Amphitryon’s homecoming to Alcmena, is turned away by Mercury, who is disguised as that very servant, and who convinces him that he (Mercury) is the real servant; but in Geta, this trickery is aided by sophistical arguments, which serve to ridicule sophists in general who style themselves philosophers.

While Geta is the most common title found in the manuscripts, other titles found include Amphitrion, Amphitrion et Geta, Alcmena et Geta and Geta et Birria.

Eustache Deschamps translated Geta into French in the fourteenth century, converting it into rhyming octosyllabic cou plets.
