= Elegiac couplet =

Poetic form used by Greek lyric poets

The elegiac couplet or elegiac distich is a poetic form used by Greek lyric poets for a variety of themes usually of smaller scale than the epic. Roman poets, particularly Catullus, Propertius, Tibullus, and Ovid, adopted the same form in Latin many years later. As with the English heroic couplet, each pair of lines usually makes sense on its own, while forming part of a larger work.

Each couplet consists of a dactylic hexameter verse followed by a dactylic pentameter verse. The following is a graphic representation of its scansion:

– uu | – uu | – uu | – uu | – uu | – x
– uu | – uu | –   || – uu | – uu | –

– is one long syllable, u one short syllable, uu is one long or two short syllables, and x is one long or one short syllable (anceps).

The form was felt by the ancients to contrast the rising action of the first verse with a falling quality in the second. The sentiment is summarized in a line from Ovid's Amores I.1.27 — Sex mihi surgat opus numeris, in quinque residat — "Let my work rise in six steps, fall back in five." The effect is illustrated by Friedrich Schiller's couplet

Im Hexameter steigt des Springquells silberne Säule,
Im Pentameter drauf fällt sie melodisch herab.

translated into English by Samuel Taylor Coleridge as:

In the hexameter rises the fountain's silvery column,
In the pentameter aye falling in melody back.

and by Alfred, Lord Tennyson, as:

Up goes the Hexameter with might as a fountain rising.
Lightly the fountain falls, lightly the Pentameter.

== Greek origins ==
The elegiac couplet is presumed to be the oldest Greek form of epodic poetry (a form where a later verse is sung in response or comment to a previous one). Scholars, who even in the past did not know who created it, theorize the form was originally used in Ionian dirges, with the name "elegy" derived from the Greek ε, λεγε ε, λεγε—"Woe, cry woe, cry!" Hence, the form was used initially for funeral songs, typically accompanied by an aulos, a double-reed wind instrument. Archilochus expanded use of the form to treat other themes, such as war, travel, and homespun philosophy. Between Archilochus and other imitators, the verse form became a common poetic vehicle for conveying any strong emotion.

At the end of the 7th century BCE, Mimnermus of Colophon struck on the innovation of using the verse for erotic poetry. He composed several elegies celebrating his love for the flute girl Nanno, and though fragmentary today, his poetry was clearly influential in the later Roman development of the form. Propertius, to cite one example, notes Plus in amore valet Mimnermi versus Homero—"The verse of Mimnermus is stronger in love than Homer".

The form continued to be popular throughout the Greek period and treated a number of different themes. Tyrtaeus composed elegies on a war theme, apparently for a Spartan audience. Theognis of Megara vented himself in couplets as an embittered aristocrat in a time of social change. Popular leaders were writers of elegies—Solon the lawgiver of Athens composed on political and ethical subjects—and even Plato and Aristotle dabbled with the meter.

A famous example of an elegiac couplet is the epitaph composed by Simonides of Ceos which Herodotus says was inscribed on a stone to commemorate those who died at the battle of Thermopylae in 490 BC:

ὦ ξεῖν᾿, ἀγγέλλειν Λακεδαιμονίοις ὅτι τῇδε
κείμεθα τοῖς κείνων ῥήμασι πειθόμενοι. (Book VII, 228)

ô xeîn᾿, angéllein Lakedaimoníois hóti têide
keímetha toîs keínōn rhḗmasi peithómenoi.

"O stranger, tell the Spartans that in this place
we lie, obeying their commands."

Cicero translates it as follows (Tusc. Disp. 1.42.101), also using an elegiac couplet:

dīc hospes Spartae, nōs t(ē) hīc vīdisse iacentēs,
dum sānctīs patriae lēgibus obsequimur.

"Say, stranger, in Sparta that you saw us lying here
while we obey the sacred laws of our fatherland."

By the Hellenistic period, the Library of Alexandria made elegy its favorite and most highly developed form. They preferred the briefer style associated with elegy in contrast to the lengthier epic forms, and made it the singular medium for short epigrams. The founder of this school was Philitas of Cos. He was eclipsed only by the school's most admired exponent, Callimachus; their learned character and intricate art would have a heavy influence on the Romans.

== Roman elegy ==
Like many Greek forms, elegy was adapted by the Romans for their own literature. The fragments of Ennius contain a few couplets, but it is the elegists of the mid-to-late first century BCE who are most commonly associated with the distinctive Roman form of the elegiac couplet. Catullus, the first of these, is an invaluable link between the Alexandrine school and the subsequent elegies of Tibullus, Propertius and Ovid. He shows a familiarity with the usual Alexandrine style of terse epigram and a wealth of mythological learning, as in his 66th poem, Coma Berenices, a direct translation of Callimachus' Lock of Berenice. His 85th poem is famous:

Odi et amo. Quare id faciam, fortasse requiris?
Nescio, sed fieri sentio et excrucior.

Translation:

I hate and I love. Why do I do this, perhaps you ask?
I know not, but I feel it happen and am tormented.

To read it correctly it is necessary to take account of the three elisions:

–  u  u| –    –|  –   u u|–    – | –  u  u|  – x
Od'et a|mo. Qua|r'id faci|am, for|tasse re|quiris?

 –  uu  |  –   uu| – ||  –  u u  | –   u u|–
Nescio, | sed fie|ri || senti'et | excruci|or.[5]

Cornelius Gallus, an important statesman of this period, was also regarded by the ancients as a great elegist, but, except for a few lines, his work has been lost.

== Elegy in the Augustan Age ==
The form reached its zenith with the collections of Tibullus and Propertius and several collections of Ovid (the Amores, Ars Amatoria, Heroides, Tristia, and Epistulae ex Ponto). The vogue of elegy during this time is seen in the so-called 3rd and 4th books of Tibullus. Many poems in these books were clearly not written by Tibullus but by others, perhaps part of a circle under Tibullus' patron Messalla. Notable in this collection are the poems of Sulpicia, thought to be the only surviving work by a Classical Latin female poet. The six elegiac poems of Lygdamus in the collection are thought by some to be an anonymous early work by Ovid, though other scholars attribute them to an imitator of Ovid who may have lived in a much later period.

Through these poets—and in comparison with the earlier Catullus—it is possible to trace specific characteristics and evolutionary patterns in the Roman form of the verse:

- The Roman authors often write about their own love affairs. In contrast to their Greek originals, these poets are characters in his own stories, and write about love in a highly subjective way.
- The form began to be applied to new themes beyond the traditional love, loss, and other "strong emotion" verse. Propertius uses it to relate aetiological or "origin" myths such as the origins of Rome (IV.1) and the Temple of Apollo on the Palatine Hill (IV.6). Ovid's Heroides—though at first glance fictitious love letters—are described by Ovid himself as a new literary form, and can be read as character studies of famous heroines from mythology. Ovid's Fasti is a lengthy elegiac poem on the first six months of the Roman calendar.
- The Romans adopted the Alexandrine habit of concealing the name of their beloved in the poem with a pseudonym. Catullus' Lesbia is notorious as the pseudonym of Clodia. But as the form developed, this habit becomes more artificial; Tibullus' Delia and Propertius' Cynthia, while likely real people, lack something of the specificity seen in Lesbia, while Ovid's Corinna is often considered a mere literary device.
- The poets become extremely strict with pentameters. For example:

- There is a trend toward the clear separation of the pentameter halves. Catullus, for example, allows an elision across the caesura in 18 cases, a rare occurrence in the later poets (Ovid, for example, never does this).
- The pentameter begins to show a semi-regular "leonine" rhyme between the two halves of the verse, e.g. Tib. I.1–2, where the culti ending the first half of the pentameter rhymes with the soli closing the verse:

dīvitiās alius fulvō sibi congerat aurō
et teneat cultī iūgera multa solī
"Let another man pile up riches for himself with yellow gold
and hold many acres of cultivated land"

While Catullus shows this rhyme in about 1 in 5 couplets, the later elegists use it more frequently. Propertius II.34, for example, has the rhyme in nearly half its pentameters. Rhyming between adjacent lines and even in the two halves of the hexameter is also observed, more than would be expected by chance alone.

- Unlike Catullus, later poets show a definite trend toward ending the pentameter with a two-syllable word. In Catullus the proportion of disyllabic endings is 39%, not dissimilar to Greek practice; in Propertius book 1, this rises to 61%; but in the last two books endings other than a disyllabic word are very rare. In Tibullus book 1 the figure is 93%. Ovid has no exceptions to the disyllabic ending in his Amores, and only a few exceptions in his later work.

- The hexameter follows the usual rhetorical trends of the dactylic hexameter in this age. If anything, the elegists are even more interested in verbal effects like alliteration and assonance.
- Overall there is a tendency to make the elegiac couplet increasingly dactylic. In Catullus the proportion of dactylic feet (not counting the verse endings, which do not vary) is about 37%; this rises to 45% in Propertius books 2 and 3; and in Ovid's Ars Amatoria it rises as high as 57%.

== Post-Augustan writers ==
Although no classical poet wrote collections of love elegies after Ovid, the verse retained its popularity as a vehicle for popular occasional poetry. Elegiac verses appear, for example, in Petronius' Satyricon, and Martial's Epigrams uses it for many witty stand-alone couplets and for longer pieces. The trend continues through the remainder of the empire; short elegies appear in Apuleius's story of Cupid and Psyche and in the minor writings of Ausonius.

== Medieval elegy ==
After the fall of the empire, one writer who produced elegiac verse was Maximianus. Various Christian writers also adopted the form; Venantius Fortunatus wrote some of his hymns in the meter, while later Alcuin and the Venerable Bede dabbled in the verse. The form also remained popular among the educated classes for gravestone epitaphs; many such epitaphs can be found in European cathedrals.

De tribus puellis is an example of a Latin fabliau, a genre of comedy which employed elegiac couplets in imitation of Ovid. The medieval theorist John of Garland wrote that "all comedy is elegy, but the reverse is not true." Medieval Latin had a developed comedic genre known as elegiac comedy. Sometimes narrative, sometimes dramatic, it deviated from ancient practice because, as Ian Thompson writes, "no ancient drama would ever have been written in elegiacs."

== Renaissance and modern period ==
With the Renaissance, more skilled writers interested in the revival of Roman culture attempted to recapture the spirit of the Augustan writers. The Dutch Latinist Johannes Secundus, for example, included Catullus-inspired love elegies in his Liber Basiorum, while the English poet John Milton wrote several lengthy elegies throughout his career. This trend continued down through the Recent Latin writers, whose close study of their Augustan counterparts reflects their general attempts to apply the cultural and literary forms of the ancient world to contemporary themes.

== See also ==
- Elegiac
- Prosody (Latin)
