= Elegiac comedy =

Medieval Latin literary genre

Elegiac comedy was a genre of medieval Latin literature—or drama—represented by about twenty texts written in the 12th and 13th centuries in the liberal arts schools of west central France (roughly the Loire Valley). Though commonly identified in manuscripts as comoedia, modern scholars often reject their status as comedy. Unlike Classical comedy, they were written in elegiac couplets. Denying their true comedic nature, Edmond Faral called them Latin fabliaux, after the later Old French fabliaux, and Ian Thomson labelled them Latin comic tales. Other scholars have invented terms like verse tales, rhymed monologues, epic comedies, and Horatian comedies to describe them. The Latin "comedies", the dramatic nature of which varies greatly, may have been the direct ancestors of the fabliaux but more likely merely share similarities. Other interpretations have concluded that they are primitive romances, student juvenilia, didactic poems, or merely collections of elegies on related themes.

Some elegiac comedies were adapted into vernacular language in the later Middle Ages, and retold by major vernacular writers such as Boccaccio, Chaucer, and Gower. The poem Pamphilus has Venetian and Old French versions.

== Style ==
These comedies were composed in a high style, but they were typically about low or unimportant subject matter; lyric complaints only sometimes mixed with amorous content. They combined the plot and character types of the Greek "new comedy" practised by Terence and Plautus, but the greatest influence on them was Ovid. His Ars amatoria, Amores, and Heroides were highly influential. Plautus, though less widely read in the Middle Ages, was also an influence, as were the Scholastic debates concerning the nature of universals and other contemporary philosophical problems, with which the elegiac comedies often dealt, always humorously but no doubt sometimes to a serious end.

The elegiac dramatists delight in "showing off" their Latin skills. Their use of rhetoric, logic, and various grammatical constructions suggest that they may have been used in the schools as exercises in poetic composition and philosophical argument. The language of their "fools" can be deliberately outlandish, and their deft use of puns is frequently sexual in nature. Parody is another typical element of elegiac humour. Persons of low rank are often placed in positions unsuited to them. Their bumbling, as when a rustic attempts to speak philosophically or the commoner pretends he is a chivalrous gentleman, is portrayed for its satiric effect. Satire is often employed in long digressions criticizing the corruption of the times, specifically targeting the selling of church offices, political corruption at court, sycophants’ attempts to rise in society, and aristocrats’ attempts to philosophize. In the Middle Ages, satire was usually considered a breed of comedy.

== Dramatic features ==
The comedies were often about a sexual conquest, in which the lover must use his guile to overcome obstacles such as guardians, rivals, and reluctance on the part of the woman. The setting is some unspecified time contemporary with the poet, and the characters are all typical and have names descriptive of their traits and function in the story. The lack of resources on the part of the hero forces him to resort to deception and to employ intermediaries (as Ovid did in his narratives) in order to win the object of his desire.

The elegiac comedies bear limited dramatic features. Thompson denies their theatricality, saying that "no ancient drama would ever have been written in elegiacs." A similar opinion is that the comedies are rhetorical exercises. Medieval poetic theory, however, did not regard comedy and elegy as mutually exclusive, nor identical. John of Garland wrote "all comedy is elegy, but the reverse is not true." Other arguments raised against the dramatic performance of the comedies is, in general, their large number of narrative segments as opposed to dialogue. Arnulf of Orléans, one of the elegiac writers, seems to have considered his work to have been made for the stage. These performances may have been narrated, mimed, or sung.

== List of elegiac comedies ==
- Alda by William of Blois
- Asinarius
- Aulularia by Vitalis of Blois
- Babio
- Baucis et Traso
- De Afra et Milone
- De clericis et rustico
- De Lombardo et lumaca
- De mercatore
- De nuncio sagaci
- De tribus puellis
- De tribus sociis
- De vetula
- Geta by Vitalis of Blois
- Lidia by Arnulf of Orléans
- Miles gloriosus by Arnulf of Orléans
- Milo by Matthew of Vendôme
- Pamphilus de amore
- Pamphilus, Gliscerium et Birria
- De Paulino et Polla by Richard of Venosa
- Unibos
- Ysengrimus by Nivardus
