= De tribus puellis =

De tribus puellis or The Three Girls is an anonymous medieval Latin poem, a narrative elegiac comedy (or fabliau) written probably in France during the twelfth or early thirteenth century. The metre (elegiac couplets) and theme (love) are modelled so thoroughly on Ovid (augmented with quotations from him) that it is erroneously ascribed to him in the two fifteenth-century manuscripts in which it is preserved.

The poem exists in several incunabula. Its first modern edition was published by Gustave Cohen in La "Comédie" latine en France au XIIe siècle (1931) with modern French translation. A second critical edition with an Italian translation by Stefano Pittaluga was published in Ferruccio Bertini, Commedie latine del XII e XIII secolo, volume 1 (1976). An English translation, with notes and a commentary but without accompanying Latin text, was prepared by Alison Goddard Elliot for the Garland Library of Medieval Literature (Seven Medieval Latin Comedies, 1984).

The plot of De tribus puellis involves the chance meeting of the narrator and three young maidens contesting the title of best singer. They implore the poet to judge their songs and all four turn off the road to a meadow to hold the competition. The first girl sings a song about battles and "fights with giants". The second girl sang of Paris, but it is the third girl, on whom the poet has already expended over twenty lines praising, who sings the best, for she sang of Jupiter and Europa. The rest of the poem describes the narrator's evening with the third girl, how they ate dinner and how they went to bed together. The poem ends, of course, immediately before the consummatory act. "Did it turn out well?" the poet asks, "Love knows all."

The last part of De tribus puellis can be read as both an expansion (amplificatio) and perversion of the fifth chapter of the first book of Ovid's Amores. Where Ovid passionately pursues Corinna's divestment, the anonymous Frenchman feigns disinterest at his girl's entrance; where Ovid devotes a meagre four lines to describing Corinna from top down before stopping at her hips, the medieval poet takes ten lines for same story, with slightly more emphasis on the (undescribed) region below the hips; and whereas Ovid's entire encounter occurs in the dim interior, De tribus puellis takes place in brilliant firelight. The medieval poem, written, no doubt, by a cleric, was intended for an audience familiar with Ovid. Thus, when the narrator of the poem says to the girl, da michi, queso, tua virginitate frui ("grant me, I beg, your virginity for my enjoyment"), the reader (or listener) is supposed to laugh at the play on Daphne's request that her father da mihi perpetua ... virginitate frui ("grant ... that I may enjoy perpetual virginity") in the Metamorphoses (I.486–87).

Despite its Ovidianism and its early misattribution, the poem has the hallmarks of medieval composition, including a highly rhetorical style and Scholastic reasoning. The rhetorical devices do not translate easily and the English can sound stilted or redundant.

== Excerpts ==
The opening lines of the poem are imitations of Horace (Satires, I.9: Ibam forte via sacra, "I chanced to be going along the Sacred Way") and Ovid (Amores, I.1, who also did not know at the outset to whom he would address his poem):

I chanced to go down a road alone one day,
and Love, just as usual, was my only companion.
And as I walked, I was composing some verses,
musing on a girl to whom to send the poems.

The poet is quite pleased by the ideal size of his girl's breasts:

I could not discern the shape of her breasts,
either because they were too small or because
they were bound up—girls frequently bind their breasts
with bands, for too buxom a bosom men
do not find enticing—but this girl, my girl,
does not have to resort to such measures,
for her bosom by nature is quite nicely small.

Her lovely breasts were small, perfect for love
(if a little bit firm, nonetheless just right for me).

The author does not follow Ovid, who believed that women desire physical compulsion, rather he portrays the willing girl submitting to her lover out of desire:

"Love, she said, do your will with me, do it swiftly,
for black night is fleeing, day returning."
Then she asked for my hand, and I stretched it out.
She placed it on her breasts and she said:
"What, my dearest love, do you feel now?"

== Bibliography ==
- Elliot, Alison Goddard (1984). Seven Medieval Latin Comedies. Garland Library of Medieval Literature, Series B, Volume 20. New York: Garland Publishing. ISBN 0-8240-9414-X.
- Rico, Francisco (1967). "Sobre el origen de la autobiografía en el «Libro de Buen Amor»." Anuario de estudios medievales, 4:301–325.
- Robathan, Dorothy M. (1932). "A Fifteenth-Century History of Latin Literature." Speculum, 7:2 (April), pp. 239–248.
