= Arnulf of Orléans (12th century) =

Latin grammarian and poet

Arnulf of Orléans (Latin: Arnulfus Aurelianensis), also known as Arnulfus Rufus (French: Arnoul le Roux), was a grammarian and poet of Latin active as a teacher in Orléans in the late twelfth century. He had a famous rivalry with Matthew of Vendôme.

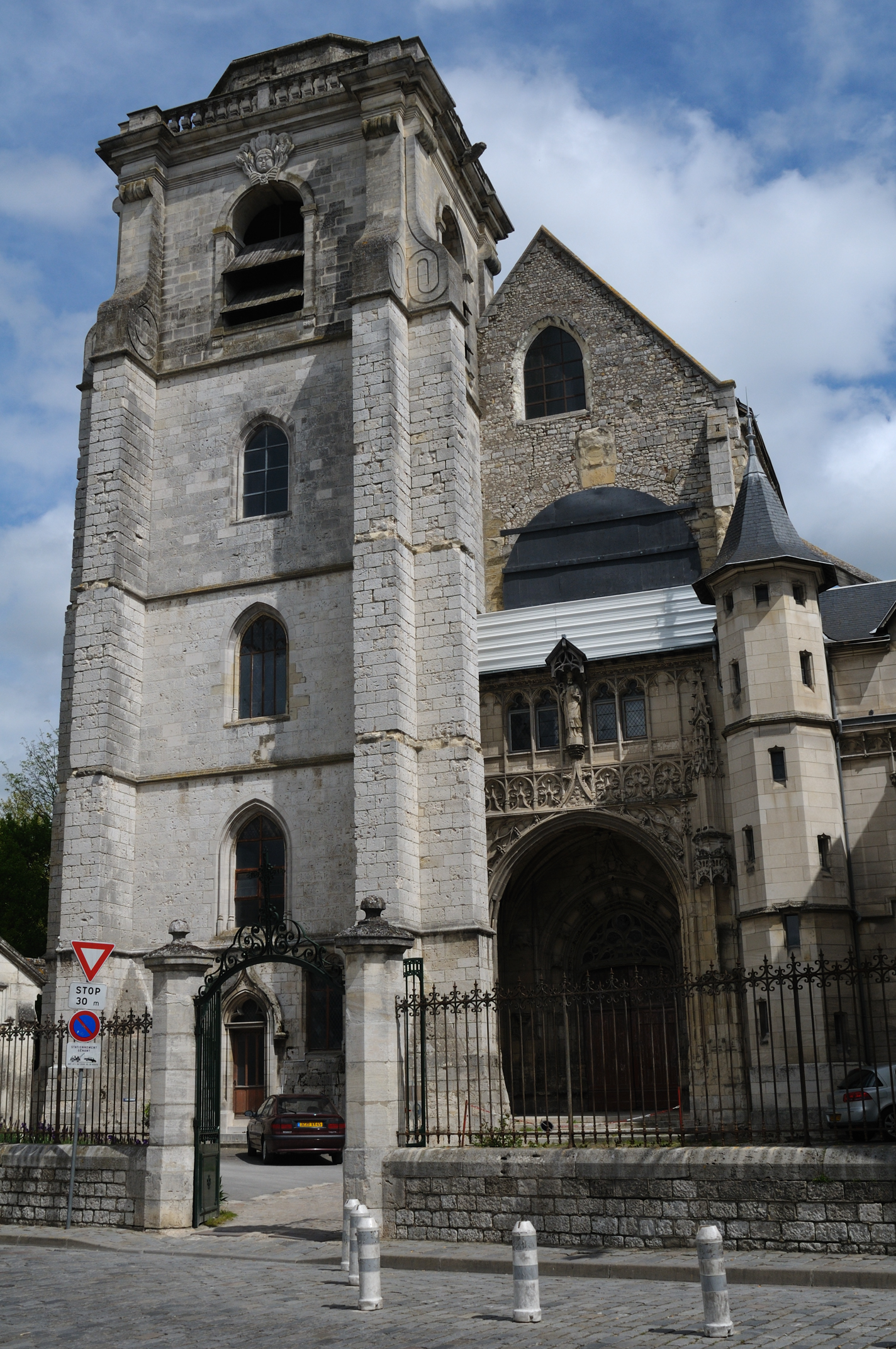
Saint-Euverte today

In Arnulf's time, Orléans was a centre of classical learning in France. Matthew associated him with the monastery of Saint-Euverte. He taught the classics in the ancient grammatical style, as opposed to the new "logical" style. His lectures on Ovid, which made no effort to soften or obscure the poet's paganism, were criticized as un-Christian and corrupting to youth by Alexander of Villedieu. In his commentaries on Ovid (Metamorphoses, Fasti, Ars amatoria) and Lucan, which circulated widely, he is sharply critical of his predecessors. Arnulf is the likely author of the elegiac comedy Lidia and possibly also of Miles gloriosus.

Arnulf and Matthew's dispute seems to have involved insulting each other's poetry. Arnulf was not reticent to insult rivals, labelling one commentary as designed for "those who have been fooled by Fulco". Likewise, he vaunted his own skills by facetiously deriving his name from the expression ardua nulla fugiens (flying from no difficulty). Matthew came out the worst and relocated to Vendôme in 1175. He was, however, successful in damaging Arnulf's reputation with his writings. In his Ars poetica, the name Rufinus and the Latin word rufus (redhead) are used throughout to insult Arnulf. Matthew also makes lewd comments about Arnulf's wife or mistress, called Rufa and Thais. He says that Arnulf proves the proverb right: redheads are cheats who cannot be trusted. His attack and his technique were influential. Hugh Primas wrote a poem accusing a redhead (rufus) of cheating him at a game of dice; there is an anonymous poem from Paris that attacks "Rufus"; and Eberhard the German praised Matthew and dismissed "Rufus". Arnulf responded directly to Matthew's Ars in the prologue of Lidia.

== Bibliography ==
- Alton, E. H. (1926). "The Mediaeval Commentators on Ovid's Fasti". Hermathena. 20 (44): 119–151. JSTOR 23037077.
- Alton, E. H.; Wormell, D. E. W. (1960). "Ovid the Mediaeval Schoolroom". Hermathena (94): 21–38. JSTOR 23040122.
- Bjork, Robert E., ed. (2010). "Arnulf of Orléans". The Oxford Dictionary of the Middle Ages. Oxford University Press. ISBN 978-0-19-866262-4.
- Engelbrecht, W. (2008). "Fulco, Arnulf, and William: Twelfth-Century Views on Ovid in Orléans". The Journal of Medieval Latin. 18: 52–73. doi:10.1484/j.jml.3.4.
- Gura, David T. (2010). A Critical Edition and Study of Arnulf of Orléans' Philological Commentary to Ovid's Metamorphoses (PhD dissertation). Ohio State University.
- Haskins, Charles H. (1927). The Renaissance of the Twelfth Century. Harvard University Press. ISBN 978-0-674-76075-2.
- Marti, Berthe M. (1955). "Hugh Primas and Arnulf of Orléans". Speculum. 30 (2): 233–238. doi:10.2307/2848472. JSTOR 2848472.
- Roy, Bruno (1974). "Arnulf of Orleans and the Latin 'Comedy'". Speculum. 49 (2): 258–266. doi:10.2307/2856043. JSTOR 2856043.
