= Il Novellino =

Anonymous medieval collection of Italian short stories

A page from the manuscript Palatino 566, showing novellas 21 and 22

Il Novellino, also known as Le cento novelle antiche ("One Hundred Ancient Tales"), is an anonymous medieval collection of short stories written in the Tuscan vernacular between 1280 and 1300. It was first published in 1525 by Carlo Gualteruzzi, a friend of Pietro Bembo.

The author of the collection is unknown; several details from the stories included in the collection suggest that he was a layperson from Florence and likely belonged to the Ghibelline faction.

Many of the stories contained in the work were used as inspiration for those found in Giovanni Boccaccio's The Decameron.
