= Edmond Faral =

French academic (1882–1958)

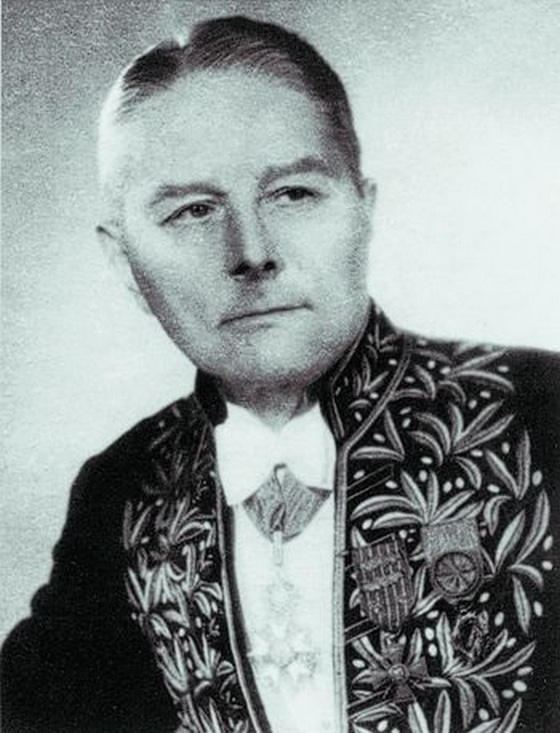
Edmond Faral

Edmond Faral (18 March 1882 – 8 February 1958) was an Algerian-born French medievalist. He became in 1924 Professor of Latin literature at the Collège de France.

He wrote his dissertation on the jongleurs, and E. R. Curtius states that he was the first to recognize an influence of the medieval Latin poetics and rhetoric on Old French poetry. He was appointed to the Académie des Inscriptions et Belles-Lettres in 1936.

== Works ==
- Les Jongleurs en France au Moyen-Âge (1910)
- Mimes français du XIIIe siècle (1910)
- Courtois d'Arras : jeu du XIII^{e} siècle (1911)
- Recherches sur les Sources Latines des Contes et Romans Courtois du Moyen-Âge (1913)
- Gautier D'aupais. Poème Courtois du XIIIème siècle (1919)
- Le Roman de Troie en prose (1922) editor with L. Constans
- La légende arthurienne. Études et documents. Les plus anciens textes (1929)
- La Chanson de Roland (1932)
- Les Arts poétiques du XIIe et du XIIIe siècle
- Vie quotidienne au temps de Saint Louis (1938)
- Textes relatifs à la civilisation matérielle et morale des temps modernes (1938)
- Petite grammaire de l'ancien français, XIIe-XIIIe siècles (1941)
- Onze poèmes de Rutebeuf concernant la croisade (1946) editor with J. Bastin
- De Babione (Poème comique du XIIème siècle) (1948)
- Jean Buridan. Notes sur les manuscrits, les éditions et le contenu de ses ouvrages, Archives d'Histoire Doctrinale et Littéraire du Moyen-Âge 15: 1-53 (1946)
- Jean Buridan: Maître és arts de l'Université de Paris, Histoire Littéraire de la France 28 (1949)
- Guillaume de Digulleville, moine de Châalis (1952)
- Les arts poétiques du XIIème et du XIII siècles. Recherches et documents sur la technique littéraire du Moyen Age (1958)
- Oeuvres complètes de Rutebeuf (1959–60)
