= La Calandria (play) =

La Calandria is a comedy of the Italian Renaissance in five acts written by Cardinal Bernardo Dovizi da Bibbiena in 1513. The plot is based on Plautus' Menaechmi and one of the central character's, Calandro, was borrowed from Giovanni Boccaccio's, Decameron. It premiered in 1513 at the Court of Urbino.

== Characters ==
- Fessenio - servant to Lidio. Rescued Lidio as a child when their city was sacked by the Turks.
- Polinico - a tutor to Lidio. Appears in the first scene of the play.
- Lidio - an adolescent. 18 years old. Separated from his twin sister, Santilla, at age 6. In love with Fulvia, a married woman.
- Calandro - Husband to Fulvia. Often described by other characters in the play as stupid.
- Samia - handmaiden to Fulivia. She acts as the messenger for all of Fulvia's wishes.
- Ruffo - a necromancer
- Santilla- Disguised as a boy ever since she was 6 years old. Twin sister to Lidio whose identity she has taken.
- Fannio - servant to Santilla. Rescued Santilla as a child when their city was sacked by the Turks.
- Fulvia - the wife of Calandro. Desperately in love with Lidio.
- A whore
- A porter
- A customs officer

== Prologues and Argumento ==
La Calandria consists of two prologues and a argumento.

^{Bibbienna was to produce the play himself but in January, a month before the play was performed, he was summoned to Florence by Cardinal de Medici to meet with the Spanish Viceroy. Thus, is fell to Castiglione to prepare and produce the play. Although Bibbiena promised to write a prologue, it only arrived a day before the production, leaving no time for the actor to learn the new prologue. Castiglione wrote one instead that the actor had already learned. Depending on translation, publisher, and edition the play will either have one of the prologues or both.}

=== Prologue by Castiglione ===
The first prologue was written by Castiglione and introduces this new comedy, the audience is about to be performed. The speaker states that it will be performed in prose not verse. The title of the play is named after Calandro, a great fool we are soon to meet. The explanation for the prose instead of verse is that the play deals with common every day issues. The subject matter is material the audience would be familiar with so the language used should be the language the audience uses on a daily basis. Furthermore, the speaker assures that the play will not be performed in Latin since it must be played for large and numerous audiences who are not all equally educated and the author would like to please the most people.

=== Prologue by Bibbiena ===
The second prologue was written by Bibbiena. The speaker describes being woken from a dream by Ser Giuliano. He begins to describe the dream to his audience in which he had found a magical ring that if he held it in his mouth he became invisible. When deciding what he could do with his invisibility he entertains the thought of sneaking into the coffers of rich men and rob them until they were left with nothing. However, he decides to travel through Florence and spy on the women as they wake and prepare for the evening's festivities. He tells the story of different houses he visits. Throughout the speech he makes the majority of them are husband and wife scenes/ He observes the trickery of husbands sneaking off to have affairs, of mistresses deceiving their husbands. Every scene is domestic in nature and deals with deceit in some manner.

=== Argumento ===
The argumento is a summary of the play that the audience is about to witness. Demetrius, a citizen of Modon, has a set of twins/ A boy named Lidio and a girl named Santilla. When they are six their father is killed when the Turks invade Modon. The twins are separated. The servant, Fannio, disguises Santilla as her twin brother for protection. They are taken prisoner, and sold to a man named Perillo who resides in Florence. A servant, Fessenio, rescue the boy Lidio and they travel to Tuscany. As Lidio grows older and begins to search for his missing twin sister, his travels take him to Rome, where he falls in love with a married woman named Fulvia. To get closer to her without detection Lidio takes on his sister's identity and sneaks into Fulvia's home as Santilla. Meanwhile, Fannio and Santilla (still disguised as a boy) become part of Perillo's household so fully that Perillo decides to arrange a marriage between his own daughter and Santilla. The argumento assures the audience after several misunderstands the twins will recognize one another. It introduces the setting as Rome and the play begins.

== La Calandria and the Court ==
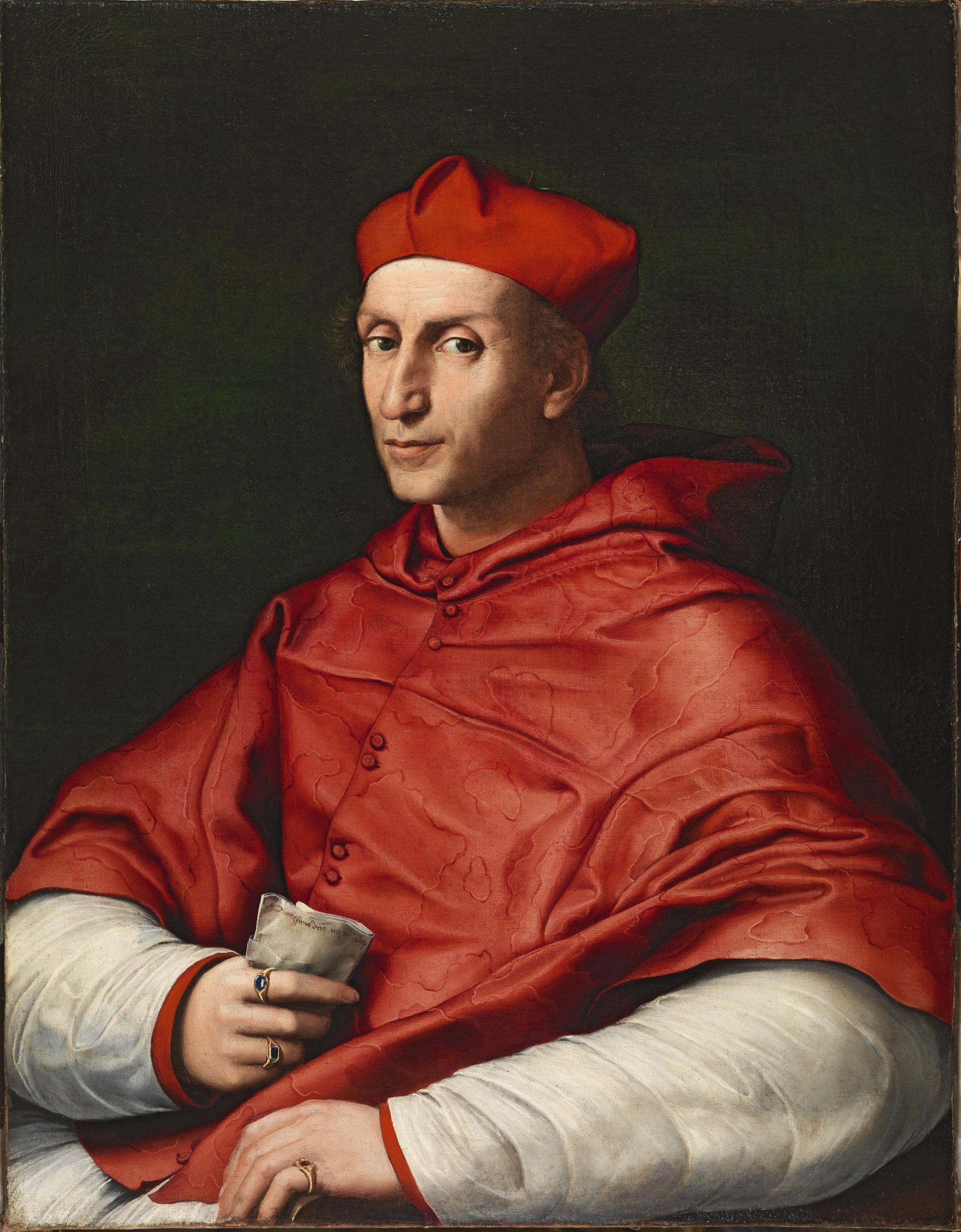
Bernardo Dovizi

At the time La Calandria was written the court held the majority of political power in society. So for theater this meant that it only existed in a space secured by the court. The courts designated the space set aside for these pleasures and entertainments that theatre provided. Presenting La Calandria, the prince gained even more political power through public entertainments sponsored by him.

== Staging ==
We have detailed information on the staging of La Calandria within the court of Urbino because of a letter written by Baldassare Castiglione (who served as the organizer of the entertainment) to Ludovico Canossa.

In the letter, the area that the audience occupied was referred to as a moat in front of walls and towers. Beyond this area, was the front of the stage, an open space (which would act as the street in the play), which stood before houses of the city. The perspectival stage set would create an illusion of a city with streets, palaces, churches and towers. It was to be an idealized Rome. In his letter, Castiglione refers to two walls which were to simulate embankments that traversed the hall. One wall is identified as the stage front and acted the city wall. The two flanking towers held the musicians.

Designers in Urbino, to create a wall that had to be seen through by the audience, the wall was turned into a frame that opened up to reveal the city beyond.

^{"The scene was laid in a very in the city, with streets, palaces, churches, and towers, all in relief, and looking as if they were real, the effect being completed by admirable paintings in scientific perspective. Among other objects there was an octagon temple in low relief, so well finished that, even if all the workmen in the duchy of Urbino had been employed, it seemed hardly possible to think that all this had been done in four months!" - Letter from Castiglione to Canossa on the performance of La Calandria.}

== Performance history ==
La Calandria was first performed on February 6, 1513, in Urbino during carnival. This was also two weeks before death of Pope Julius II and the ascent of the Medici's to power on the papal throne. It was presented in the Urbino throne room and prepared by Castiglione, the duke of Novellara. Castiglione is also responsible for the prologue of the script. Scenes were created by a student of Raphael (a close friend of Dovizi), Girolamo Genga. The play proved to be a success and would be continued to be performed on several occasions. The Vatican produced it in December 1514 and January 1515; in Mantua in 1520 and in 1532; in Venice in 1521 and 1522; in Lyon in 1548; and in Munich in 1569.

== Themes ==
=== Love ===
The power of love, what love does to one's mind, what one will do for love are all topics repeatedly discussed between characters. Fulvia is overwhelmed by her passions for Lidio and his love for her. However, his love is overwhelmed by his fear of being discovered in the affair.

=== Symmetry and Doubling ===
This theme comes not from just the subject matter of the play but rather the action on stage. Symmetry in the script emphasizes the importance of the theme. The switching of clothes with the changes in identity and sex. Lidio, primarily dresses as a man, and only on occasion does he wear women's clothing. Santilla on the other hand primarily dresses in drag as a man and very little does she get to wear female clothing. The twins appear together on stage four times exactly. This is exactly the number of times necessary to exhaust all possible combinations of drag: once both dressed as men, once both dressed as women and two others with their genders swapped including one in which they are dressed as their true sex. However, at the end the twins must reconcile that they can no longer disguise themselves and continue with their duplicitous lifestyles. Only when they abandon their exchangeable identities and return to separate, different beings can the play end. In the twin's recognition of one another and their appearance in clothing of their true sex is their maturation and entry into adulthood and marriage.

== Inspiration from Plautus ==
=== Twins ===
Bibbiena used the plot of Menaechmi as the basis for his plot. Sources assume that Bibbiena changed the genders of the twins from two males to a male and female to remove aspects of homosexuality. This allowed him to end his play with the correct social and engendered behavior of the time.

=== The Lock-Out ===
This is to say a scene in which the twin or lover is locked out of his house, a twist that is seen throughout Italian theatre and late in plays such as Shakespeare's Comedy of Errors. This motif creates comic tension, enhanced by the presence of two pairs of twins and increases the errors.

== Production history ==
The opera, Calandro, is a three-act German opera based on Bibbiena's Calandria. It was first performed in 1726. It is composed by Giovanni Alberto Ristori to a libretto by Stefano Benedetto Pallavicino.

== See also ==
- Bernardo Dovizi
- Baldassare Castiglione
- Count of Urbino
- Italian Renaissance
