= Calandro =

Opera composed by Giovanni Alberto Ristori

- Opera buffa by Giovanni Alberto Ristori
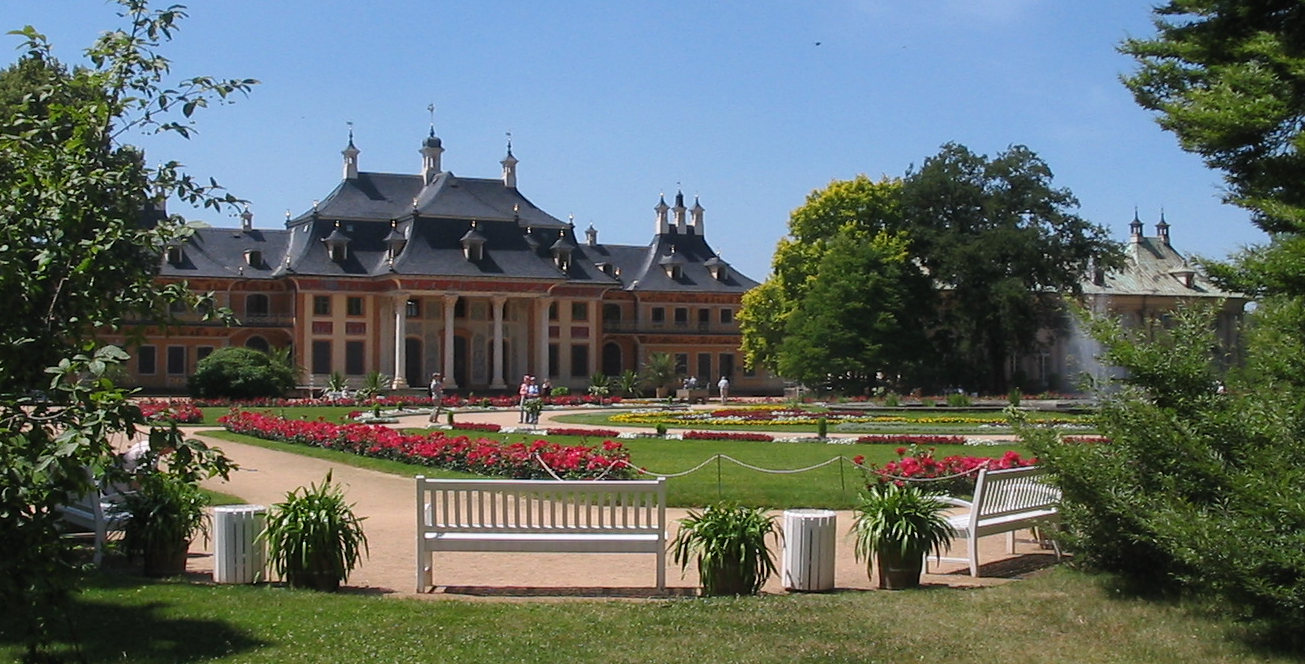
- Schloss Pillnitz, where the opera premiered in 1726
- Librettist: Stefano Benedetto Pallavicino
- Language: Italian
- Based on: Il Calandro by Bernardo Dovizi
- Premiere: 2 September 1726; Schloss Pillnitz, near Dresden

Calandro is an opera buffa in three acts composed by Giovanni Alberto Ristori to a libretto by Stefano Benedetto Pallavicino. The libretto was based on the comedy Il Calandro by Bernardo Dovizi (Cardinal Bibbiena). In turn, Dovizi's play borrowed elements of the plot from Plautus's Menaechmi and the character Calandro from Boccaccio's Decameron It was first staged on 2 September 1726 in Dresden.

== Background and performance history ==
Calandro premiered on 2 September 1726 in the court theatre at the Schloss Pillnitz (Pillnitz Castle) near Dresden at the request of Maria Josepha of Austria to celebrate the return of her husband, Crown Prince Frederick Augustus, from Warsaw. It was probably Germany's first opera buffa, and after hearing a performance during the 1728 Carnival season in Dresden, Frederick Augustus' father August II asked for a copy of the score. Three years later, in 1731, it became the first Italian opera presented in Russia. There it was given in Moscow for the celebration of the coronation of Empress Anna. It was produced under his and his father's direction with thirteen actors and nine singers including Ludovica Seyfried, Margherita Ermini and Rosalia Fantasia.

Like most of Ristori's operas Calandro eventually fell into oblivion. However, it was revived in a recording by the Batzdorfer Hofkapelle in 2004, and will have a fully staged performance in June 2011 as part of the Potsdam Sanssouci Music Festival.

== Synopsis ==
- Calandro, disillusioned with mankind and wanting to return to nature, spends his days in a forest with his tame bears. There, Alceste, leader of the shepherds, engages him as the tutor for his son, Nearco. Through a series of twists and turns, the unruly Nearco contrives to get rid of his tutor and in the process sort out the problems of his friend Licisco who is in love with Clizia.

== Recordings ==
- Giovanni Alberto Ristori: Calandro, commedia per musica. Batzdorfer Hofkapelle; Tobias Schade and Stefan Rath (conductors). Label: KammerTon (KT 22005) Audio CD, 2004.
  - Egbert Junghanns (Calandro) – baritone; Jan Kobow (Alceste) – tenor; Martin Wölfel (Nearco) – countertenor; Maria Jonas (Agide) – mezzo-soprano; Britta Schwarz (Clizia) – contralto

== Operas set to the same story ==
- Antonio Sacchini, L'avaro deluso, o Don Calandrino, premiered November 24, 1778 London
- Johann Georg Schürer, Calandro, premiered January 20, 1748, Dresden
- Giuseppe Gazzaniga, Il Calandrino (Il Calandrano), premiered 1771, Venice
