= Bernardo Dovizi =

Italian Catholic cardinal and playwright (1470–1520)

His Eminence Bernardo Dovizi
- Cardinal-Deacon of Santa Maria in Portico
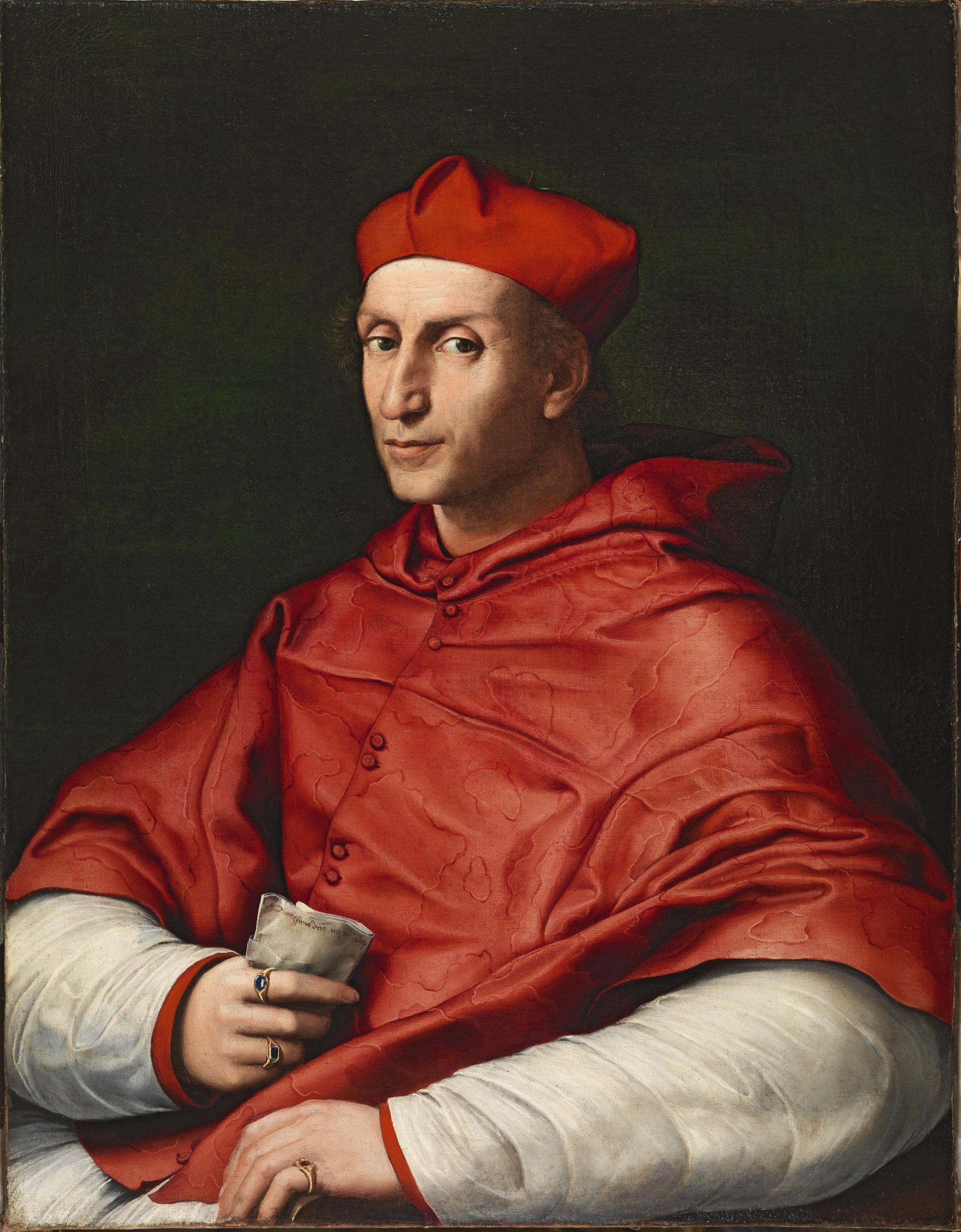
- Portrait of Cardinal Bibbiena by Raphael
- Church: Catholic Church

Orders
- Created cardinal: 23 September 1513 by Pope Leo X

Personal details
- Born: 4 August 1470 Bibbiena, Italy
- Died: 9 November 1520 (aged 50) Rome, Papal States
- Coat of arms

Bernardo Dovizi of Bibbiena (4 August 1470 – 9 November 1520) was an Italian cardinal and comedy writer, known best as Cardinal Bibbiena, for the town of Bibbiena, where he was born.

== Biography ==
He received a substantial literary training, and became a preceptor and boon companion of Giovanni dei Medici, the future Pope Leo X (from 1513 to his death in 1521). In November 1494, when the Medici were banished, he supported them. Soon afterwards he was rewarded with the protection of Julius II and many honours at the Roman court. In 1513 his arduous efforts on behalf of his lifelong patron secured the election of Giovanni dei Medici to the pontifical throne.

Leo X repaid such services by naming him a Cardinal in the Consistory of 23 September 1513, and appointing him Cardinal Deacon of S. Maria in Portico. Leo continued to show his favor by appointing Bibbiena his treasurer and entrusting him with many important missions, among them the command of the Papal army in the War of Urbino (1517) and a legation to France (1518). Later on, the cardinal's strong sympathies for France lost him Leo's confidence. As cardinal he steadily extended his generous patronage of the arts - he was a close friend of Raphael, whom he had known since his youth, and arranged his engagement to his niece. Raphael painted a number of works for him, including frescoes of a classical and erotic style for his bathroom in the Vatican.

=== Author ===
His literary fame is mainly connected with the first comedy of note written in Italian prose, La Calandra (also, known as Il Calandro and La Calandria), was probably given for the first time at Urbino, about 1507. It was performed elaborately at Rome, seven years later, in the presence of Leo X and Isabella Gonzaga d'Este, Marchioness of Mantua. Though containing glaringly immoral scenes, using the plot of Plautus's Menaechmi, it possessed the features of modern comedy and won plaudits for its sparkling wit and fine characterization.

The main character, Calandro or Calandrino, was borrowed from Giovanni Boccaccio's Decameron in which he appears as a character in four stories. The author of the comedy sympathizes with Fulvia, and her lover Lidio, mocking the foolish husband of Calandro, who falls in love with Lidio, who changes into women's dress. The speeches of Fesenio, the servant of Calandro, shine with Italian sparkling jokes.

Ariosto and Machiavelli imitated this comedy in their plays.

A Paduan poet serving at the Dresden Court, Stefano Benedetto Pallavicino, wrote a libretto based on the same story for the comic opera Calandro by Giovanni Alberto Ristori. It was first staged in 1726 at the castle of Pilnitz near Dresden, and in 1731 in Moscow it was the first ever opera performed in Russia.

There were also the operas by:

- Antonio Sacchini, L'avaro deluso, o Don Calandrino (24 November 1778 London)
- Johann Georg Schürer, Calandro (20 January 1748 Dresden)
- Giuseppe Gazzaniga, Il Calandrino (1771 Venice)

== See also ==
- Stufetta del cardinal Bibbiena
- Plautus
- Menaechmi
- Calandro
- Stefano Benedetto Pallavicino
- Summary of Decameron tales

== Sources ==
- Barbiche, B.; S. de Dainville Barbiche (1985). "Les lègats "a latere" en France," in: Archivium historiae pontificiae, 22 (1985), pp. 93–165 at p. 50.
- Cardella, Lorenzo (1793). Memorie storiche de' cardinali della santa romana. Tomo quarto (Roma: Pagliarini 1793), pp. 7–9.
- Dovizi, Bernardo (1955). G L Moncallero (ed.). Epistolario di Bernardo Dovizi da Bibbiena (in Italian and Latin). Firenze: L.S. Olschki.
- Gaeta, F. (1969. "Il Bibbiena diplomatico," Rinascimento, serie 2, 9 (1969), pp. 69–94.
- Moncallero, Giuseppe Lorenzo (1953). Il Cardinale Bernardo Dovizi da Bibbiena: umanista e diplomatico (1470–1520), uomini e avvenimenti del rinascimento alla luce di documenti inediti (in Italian). Firenze: L.S. Olschki.
- Santelli, A. (1931). Il cardinal Bibbiena, Bologna 1931. (panegyric)
