= Agnolo Firenzuola =

Italian poet and litterateur

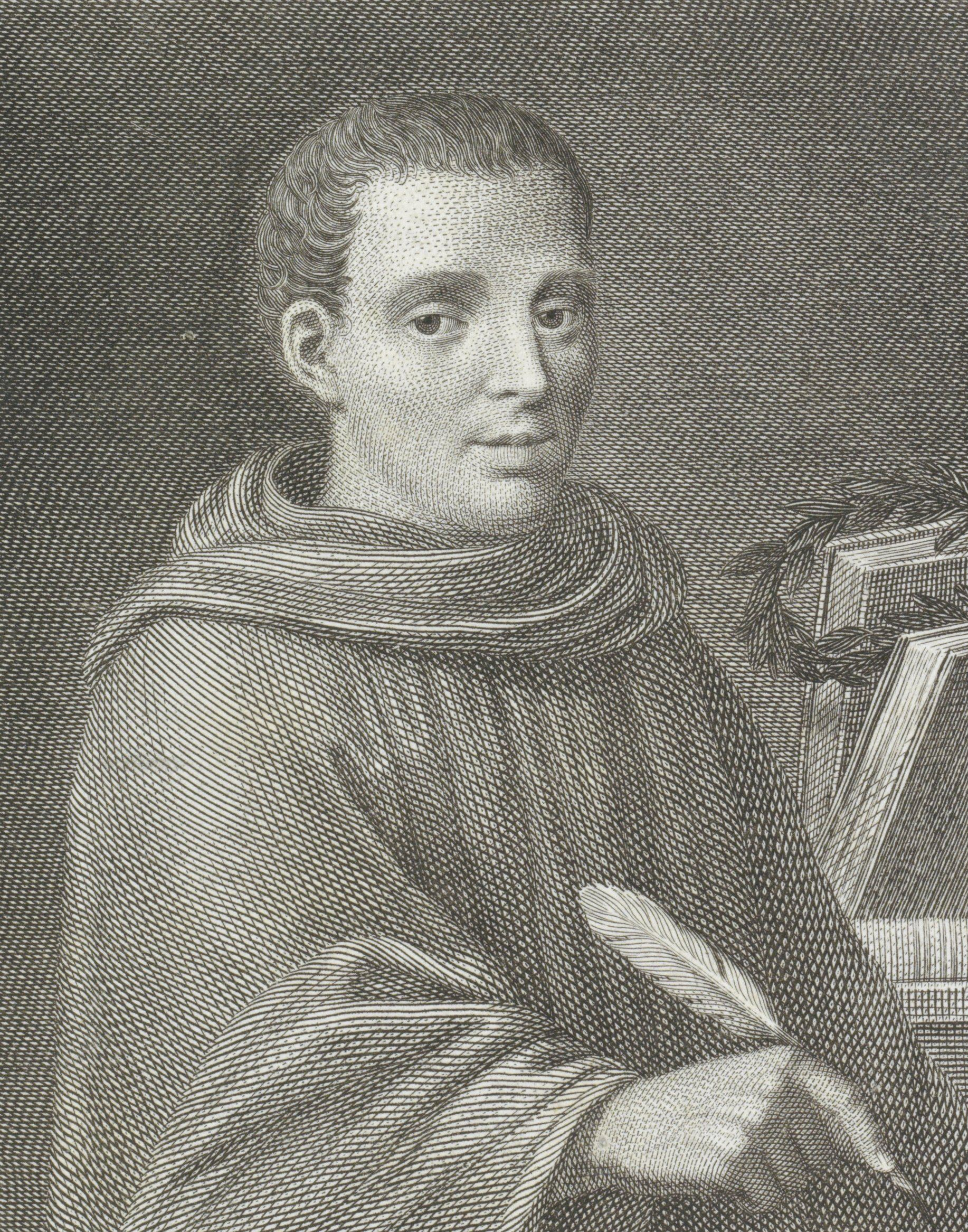
Agnolo Firenzuola

Agnolo Firenzuola (28 September 1493 – 27 June 1543) was an Italian writer and poet, of mainly secular works, despite having been a Vallombrosan monk.

== Biography ==
Agnolo Firenzuola was born in Florence. The family name was taken from the town of Firenzuola, situated at the foot of the Apennines, its original home. Agnolo's grandfather had obtained the citizenship of Florence and transmitted it to his family. Agnolo initially studied law at Siena, graduating in 1516, and afterwards at Perugia. There he became the associate of the notorious Pietro Aretino. They met again at Rome, where Agnolo attempted to practice law, but was not successful and often afflicted with likely malaria. Firenzuola left Rome after the death of Pope Clement VII, and after spending some time at Florence, settled at Prato as abbot of Badia San Salvatore in Vaiano.

It is asserted by all his biographers that while still a young man he assumed the monastic dress at Vallombrosa, and that he afterwards held successively two abbacies. Girolamo Tiraboschi ventures to doubt this account.

His writings, of which a collected edition was published posthumously in 1548, are partly in prose and partly in verse. Among the prose works are Discorsi degli animali, derived from the animal fables of Aesop and the Panchatantra; Dialogo delle bellezze delle donne (Dialogue of the beauty of women), also translated into French; Ragionamenti amorosi, a series of short tales in the manner of Boccaccio, rivalling him in elegance and in licentiousness; Discacciamento delle nuove lettere, a controversial piece against Giangiorgio Trissino's proposal to introduce new letters into the Italian alphabet; a free version or adaptation of The Golden Ass of Apuleius, which became a favorite book and passed through many editions; and two comedies, I Lucidi, an imitation of the Menaechmi of Plautus, and La Trinuzia, which in some points resembles the Calandria of Cardinal Bibbiena.

His poems are chiefly satirical and burlesque. All his works are esteemed as models of literary excellence, and are cited as authorities in the vocabulary of the Accademia della Crusca. The date of Firenzuola's death is only approximately ascertained. He had been dead several years when the first edition of his writings appeared (1548).

== Bibliography ==
- Agnolo Firenzuola, On the Beauty of Women, trans. Konrad Eisenbichler and Jacqueline Murray. Philadelphia: University of Pennsylvania Press, 1992.
