= John Payne (poet) =

English poet and translator (1842-1916)

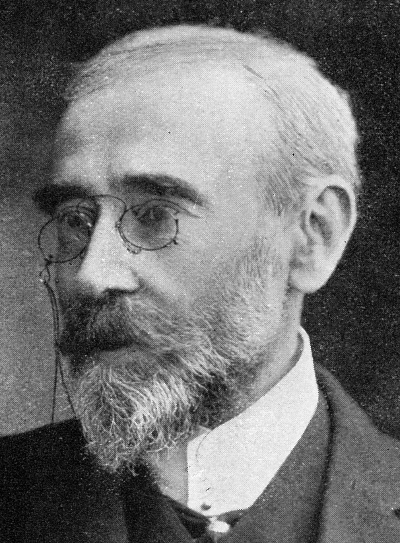
- A photograph of John Payne, 1904
- Born: 23 August 1842; Bloomsbury, London, England
- Died: 11 February 1916 (aged 73); South Kensington, London, England
- Occupations: Poet, translator, solicitor

John Payne (23 August 1842 – 11 February 1916) was an English poet and translator. Initially he pursued a legal career and had associated with Dante Gabriel Rossetti. Later he became involved with limited edition publishing and the Villon Society.

He is now best known for his translations of Boccaccio's Decameron, The Arabian Nights and the Diwan Hafez.

After completing his translation of Omar Khayyam, Payne returned to the rendition of Hafez that was eventually published in 3 volumes. in 1901. Payne argues that Hafez takes the "whole sweep of human experience and irradiates all things with his sun-gold and his wisdom".

Payne once said that Hafez, Dante and Shakespeare were the three greatest poets of the world.

== Archives ==
Papers of John Payne are held at the Cadbury Research Library, University of Birmingham.

== Works ==
- The Masque of Shadows and other poems (1870)
- Intaglios; sonnets (1871)
- Songs of Life and Death. (1872)
- Lautrec: A Poem (1878)
- The Poems of François Villon.(1878)
- New Poems (1880)
- The Book of the Thousand Nights and One Night (1882–4) translation in nine volumes
- Tales from the Arabic (1884)
- The Novels of Matteo Bandello, Bishop of Agen (1890) translation in six volumes
- The Decameron by Giovanni Boccaccio (1886) translation in three volumes
- Alaeddin and the Enchanted Lamp; Zein Ul Asnam and The King of the Jinn: (1889) editor and translator
- The Persian Letters of Montesquieu (1897) translator
- The Quatrains of Omar Kheyyam of Nisahpour (1898)
- Poems of Master François Villon of Paris (1900)
- The Poems of Shemseddin Muhammed Hafiz of Shiraz (1901): translation in three volumes
- Oriental Tales: The Book of the Thousand Nights and One Night [and other tales]. (1901) verse and prose translation in 15 volumes, edited by Leonard C. Montesquieu Smithers
- The Descent of the Dove and other poems (1902)
- Poetical Works (1902) two volumes
- Stories of Boccaccio (1903)
- Vigil and Vision: New Sonnets (1903)
- Hamid the Luckless and other tales in verse (1904)
- Songs of Consolation: New Poems (1904)
- Sir Winfrith and other poems (1905)
- Selections from the Poetry of John Payne (1906) selected by Tracy and Lucy Robinson
- Flowers of France: Romantic Period (1906)
- Flowers of France, The Renaissance Period (1907)
- The Quatrains of Ibn et Tefrid (1908, second edition 1921)
- Flowers of France: the Latter Days (1913)
- Flowers of France: The Classic Period (1914)
- The Way of the Winepress (1920)
- Nature and Her Lover (1922)
- The Autobiography of John Payne of Villon Society Fame, Poet and Scholar (1926)

== See also ==
- Thorgerda
