= Stufetta del cardinal Bibbiena =

Cycle of frescos by Raphael

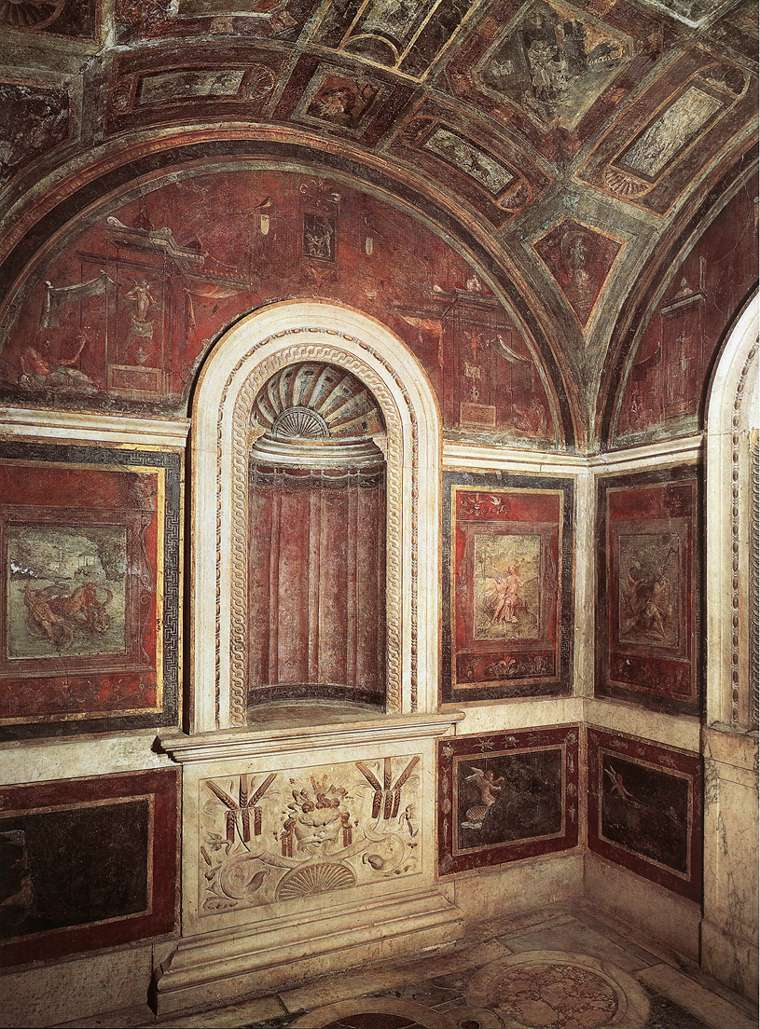
- Artist: Raphael
- Year: 1516
- Type: Fresco
- Dimensions: 55 cm × 45 cm (22 in × 18 in)
- Location: Apostolic Palace, Vatican City
- Owner: Holy See

The Stufetta del cardinal Bibbiena ("Small Heated Room of Cardinal Bibbiena") is a small room on the third floor of the Apostolic Palace in the Vatican which is decorated with a cycle of erotic frescoes painted in 1516 by Raphael (or by artists in his circle to his designs). The frescos depict mythological scenes from Ovid and Maurus Servius Honoratus in an antique style echoing Ancient Roman interior décor of the Domus Aurea, which had also inspired the decoration of the Raphael Rooms and the Vatican loggias.

The room is approximately 2.5 m (8.2 ft) square with a cross vault, with a door in the east wall opposite a window in the west well and niches to either side. The vault and the lunette at the top of each wall are decorated with grotesques, above two main panels on each wall. The eight panels show mythological scenes, including the birth of Erichonius, the birth of Venus, Venus and Cupid with dolphins, Venus wounded by Cupid, and Pan and Syrinx, with further decorative panels below.

The room was commissioned by Cardinal Bibbiena (1470–1520) for his apartments, beside the Loggetta del cardinal Bibbiena, and originally served as a washing room for Bibbiena. The Italian stufetta can be translated literally as "small stove" and denoted a warm room; that is a washing room. Cardinal Bibbiena was the private secretary to Pope Leo X.

The artist Vincenzo Camuccini converted the room into a chapel in the 18th century by adding wooden panelling and a canvas vault, but these additions were removed later.
