= Thorgerda =

Thorgerda is a 19th-century poem by John Payne. The subject of the poem, Thorgerda, is a woman who threatens to commit suicide in the Egil's Saga.

== See also ==
- Freyja
- Naglfar
