= Johann Georg Schürer =

Johann Georg (Adam) Schürer (c. 1720 – 16 February 1786) was a German baroque composer. He worked as a church composer in Dresden for most of his life.

== Biography ==
Schürer was born in Roudnice nad Labem. From 1746, he worked in Dresden. He composed five operas before 1748, when he was appointed a church composer. He retired in 1780 and died on 16 February 1786 in Dresden.

== Operas ==
- Astrea placata ovvero La felicità della terra, (libretto Biaggio Campagnari), 7 October 1746 Warsaw; 29. Oct. 1746 Dresden, Mingottisches Theater
- La Galathea (libretto Pietro Metastasio), dramma per musica 2 Acts 8. Nov. 1746 Dresden, Mingottisches Theater
- Doris, ein musikalisches Schäferspiel in 2 parts 13. Feb. 1747 Dresden, Mingottisches Theater
- L'Ercole sul Termodonte (libretto Giacomo Francesco Bussani), dramma per musica 3 acts 19. July 1747 Dresden, Mingottisches Theater
- Calandro (libretto Stefano Benedetto Pallavicino), comedia per musica 3 acts (20. Jan. 1748 Dresden, Mingottisches Theater
