= Buonamico Buffalmacco =

14th-century Italian Renaissance painter

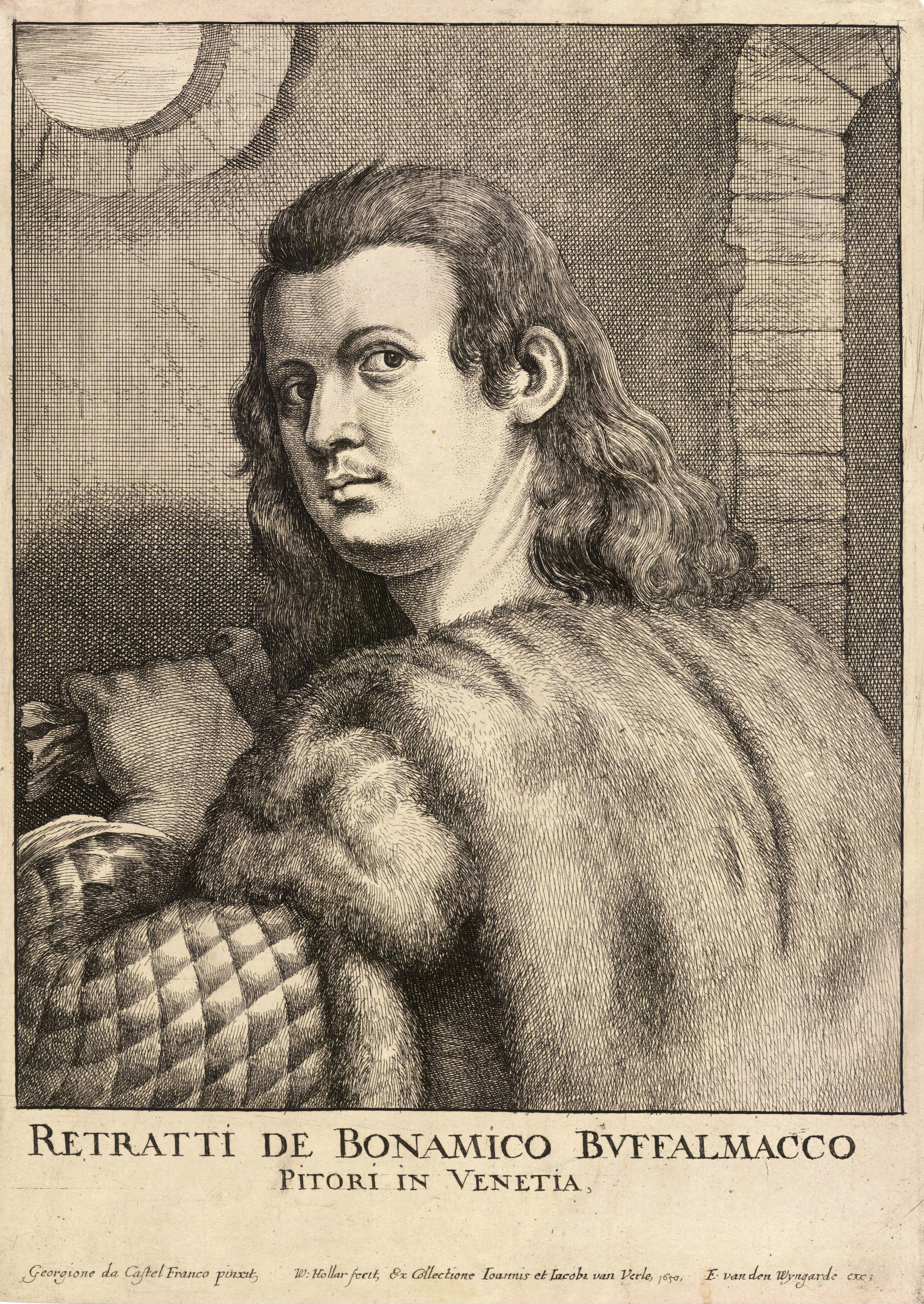
17th-century engraving of Buffalmacco by Wenceslaus Hollar

Buonamico di Martino, otherwise known as Buonamico Buffalmacco (active c. 1315–1336), was an Italian Renaissance painter who worked in Florence, Bologna, and Pisa. Although none of his known work has survived, he is widely assumed to be the painter of a most influential fresco cycle preserved in the Campo Santo of Pisa, featuring The Three Dead and the Three Living, the Triumph of Death, the Last Judgement, the Hell, and the Thebais (several episodes from the lives of the Desert Fathers).

Painted some ten years before the Black Death spread over medieval Europe in 1348, the cycle enjoyed an extraordinary success after that date, and was often imitated throughout Italy during the Renaissance. The youngsters' party enjoying themselves in a beautiful garden while Death piles mounds of corpses all around is likely to have inspired the setting of Giovanni Boccaccio's literary masterpiece The Decameron, written a few years after the spread of the Black Death (1348–1353).

== Reception ==
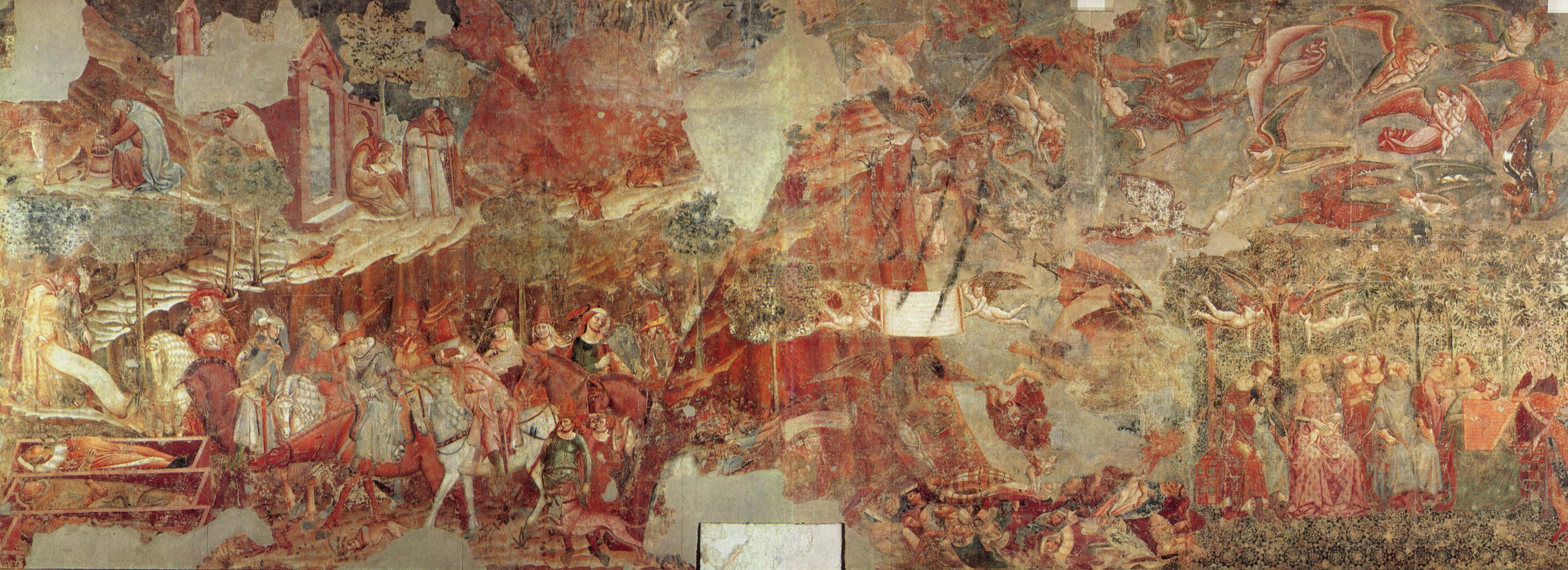
From left to right: L'incontro dei tre vivi e dei tre morti ("The Three Dead and the Three Living") and Trionfo della Morte ("Triumph of Death"). The latter fresco was painted between c. 1330s–1350 (disputed); both are currently preserved in the Campo Santo of Pisa.

Giovanni Boccaccio in his Decameron and Franco Sacchetti in his Il trecentonovelle both describe Buonamico Buffalmacco as being a practical joker. Boccaccio features Buonamico along with his friends and fellow painters Calandrino and Bruno in several tales (Day VIII, tales 3, 6, and 9; Day IX, tales 3 and 5). Typically in these stories, Buonamico uses his wits to play tricks on his friends and associates: convincing Calandrino that a stone he possesses (heliotrope) confers invisibility (VIII, 3), stealing a pig from Calandrino (VIII, 6), convincing the physician Master Simone of an opportunity to ally himself with the Devil (VIII, 9), convincing Calandrino that he has become pregnant (IX, 3), convincing Calandrino that a particular scroll can cause a woman to fall in love with him (IX, 5). Throughout the stories, Buonamico is frequently depicted at work painting in the houses of notable gentlemen in Florence but eager to take time to eat, drink, and be merry.

Italian art historian Giorgio Vasari included a biography of Buonamico Buffalmacco in his Lives of the Most Excellent Painters, Sculptors, and Architects (1550–1568), in which he tells several anecdotes about his comic escapades. Vasari tells of Buonamico's youthful tricking of his master Tafi during his apprenticeship, various pranks and tricks that Buonamico played on his patrons, and his habit of embedding texts within his paintings. Dismissed by Vasari as just another of the witty painter's gags, which his "clumsy" contemporaries had misunderstood and foolishly imitated, the frescoes located in the Campo Santo of Pisa are actually scattered with texts, a possible indication of the veracity of Vasari's remark. In the scroll over the cripple beggars in the center of the Trionfo della Morte ("Triumph of Death"), for instance, it's written: "Since prosperity has completely deserted us, O Death, you who are the medicine for all pain, come to give us our last supper".

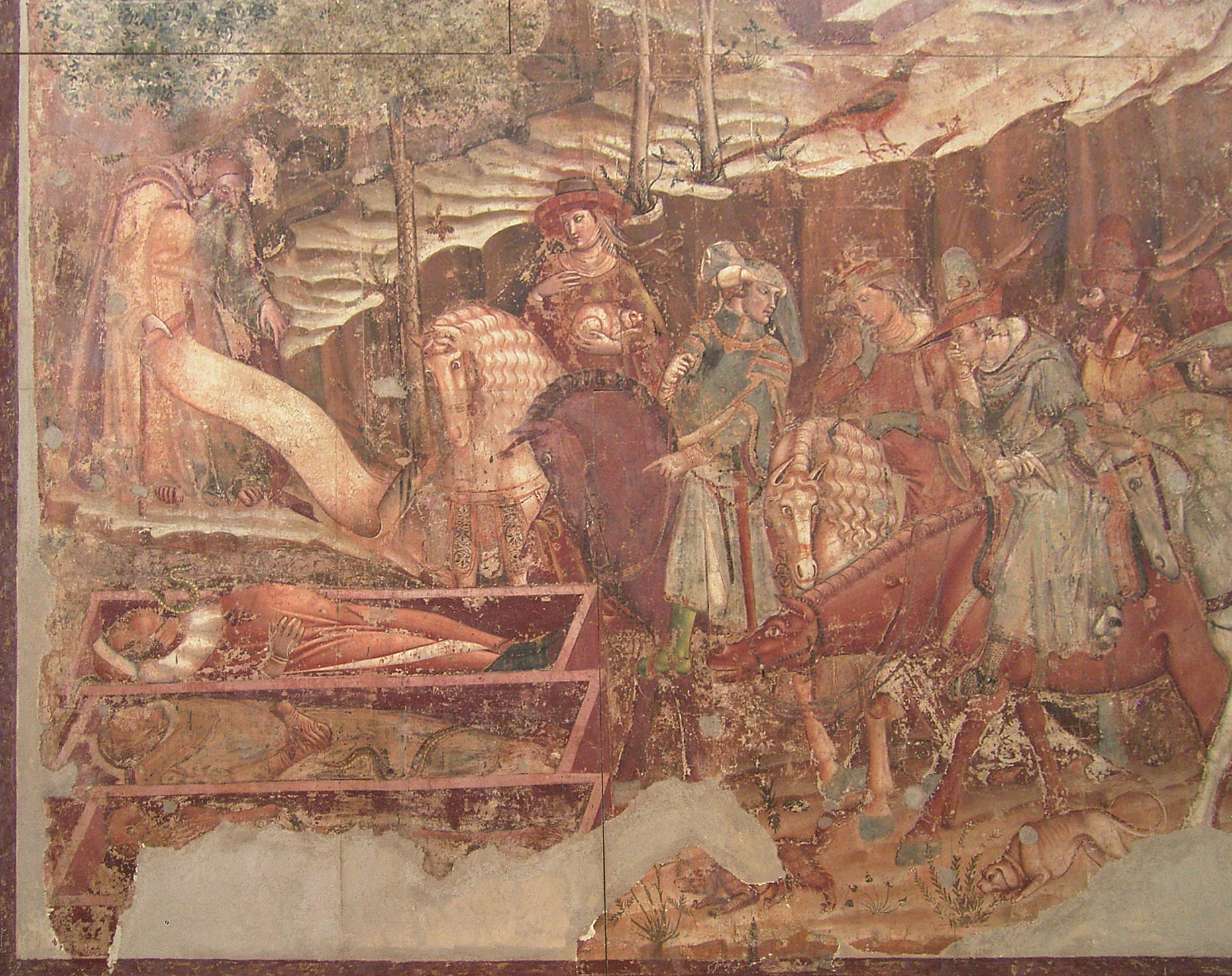
Detail of Trionfo della Morte ("Triumph of Death"): three stylish young aristocrats mounted on fine horses encounter three coffin-encased corpses in differing stages of decomposition.

In the Trionfo della Morte ("Triumph of Death"), a group of leisurely young aristocrats and their animals occupy the central part of the fresco. These rich young men and women riding horses, surrounded by their decorative hunting dogs, have gone on a pleasant journey. But suddenly, their path, somewhere deep in the wood, is barred by three open coffins with corpses in different degrees of decomposition. Everybody in the scene including men, women, and even the animals are horrified by this terrible and palpable presence of Death. The unsupportable stench hits their noses and the abhorring scene of cruel truth dismays them. The elder monk standing above them teaches the youngsters a lesson about life and death by reading from a scroll.

Vasari discusses various paintings by the artist which no longer exist, and many of which had already perished by the time of Vasari's writing in the 16th century. He describes a series of paintings at the convent of Faenza in Florence (already destroyed by the 16th century), works for the abbey of Settimo (now also lost), tempera paintings for the monks of the abbey of Certosa (also in Florence), and frescoes in the Badia at Florence. He describes a series of paintings depicting the life of Saint Catherine of Siena in a chapel in her honor in Assisi at the Basilica of Saint Francis (an attribution rejected by later scholars), and several prominent commissions at various abbeys and convents in Pisa. Vasari does not attribute the famed Pisan frescoes now associated with Buonamico to the painter, but rather, credits him with four frescoes preserved in the Campo Santo, depicting the Biblical narrative on the creation of the world through the building of Noah's Ark, which later scholars have instead attributed to Piero di Puccio of Orvieto. Vasari further presents conflicting information regarding Buonamico's death, dating it to the year 1340, but also stating that he was still alive in 1351. In any case, he is said to have died at the age of 78, in poverty, and to have been buried at the hospital of Santa Maria Novella, in Florence.

== See also ==
- Black Death in medieval culture
- Italian Renaissance literature
- Themes in Italian Renaissance painting
