= Portrait of Cardinal Bibbiena (Raphael) =

Painting by Raphael

- Ritratto del cardinale Bibbiena (Italian)
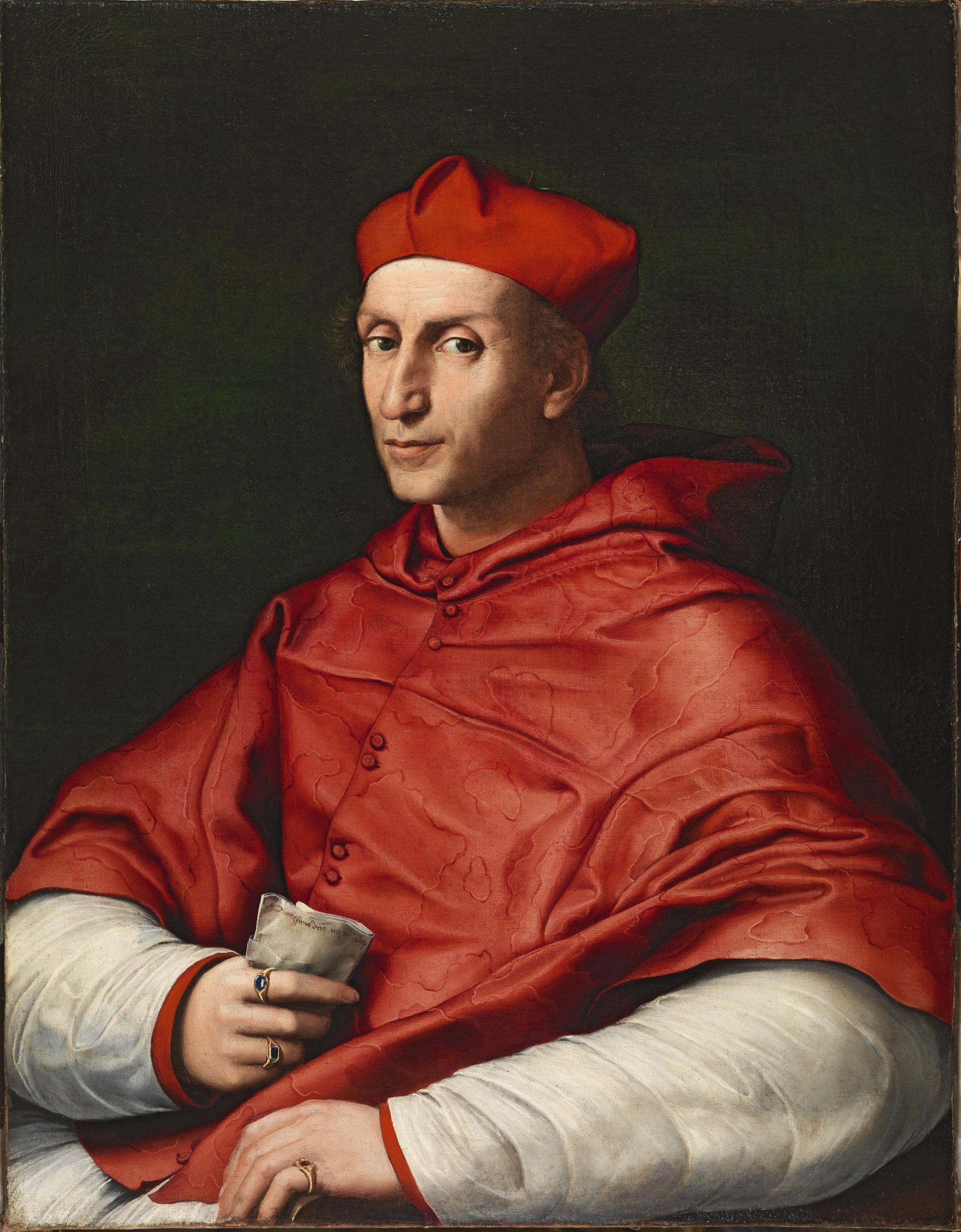
- Artist: Raphael
- Year: c.1516
- Medium: Oil on canvas
- Dimensions: 85 cm × 66.3 cm (33 in × 26.1 in)
- Location: Galleria Palatina (Palazzo Pitti), Florence

The Portrait of Cardinal Bibbiena is a painting of Cardinal Bernardo Dovizi da Bibbiena (Pope Leo X's private secretary) by Raphael, created around 1516. It is currently housed in the Palazzo Pitti in Florence. The rendering appears more rigid than usual for Raphael, leading some critics to attribute it to one of his pupils or suggest it may be a copy of a lost original by the artist.

== See also ==
- List of paintings by Raphael
