= Antoine Le Maçon =

French translator

Antoine Le Maçon (born c. 1500 at Buis-les-Baronnies; died 1559) was a French translator.

== Life ==
A Royal councillor and treasurer for war, Le Maçon became private secretary to Margaret, Queen of Navarre. To please the princess, who loved letters and novels, he undertook a translation into French of Boccaccio's Decameron, the first made directly from the original Italian, which was printed in Lyon by Roville, and in Paris by Olivier Harsy, in 1569. This translation retained the strength of the Italian in all the "offensive" episodes, none of which were bowdlerised.

Like later editions of the Italian original, subsequent editions of Le Maçon's translation did, however, censor or omit some words, passages or tales, until the 1757 edition, which is much sought after for its beautiful engravings.

Le Maçon also published an edition of the works of Jean Lemaire de Belges and of Clément Marot.

He has sometimes, wrongly, been attributed as the author of Érotasmes ou les Amours de Phydie et de Gélasine (Lyon, 1550, in-8°), which is actually the work of Philibert Bugnyon.

== Sources ==
- Louis-Maïeul Chaudon, Antoine François Delandine, Nouveau dictionnaire historique, vol. VII, Lyon, Bruyset ainé, 1804, p. 465.
- Jean-Antoine Rigoley de Juvigny, Les Bibliothéques françoises de La Croix du Maine et de Du Verdier, Paris, Saillant & Nyon; Michel Lambert, 1772, p. 42.
