= Menaechmi =

Play by Plautus

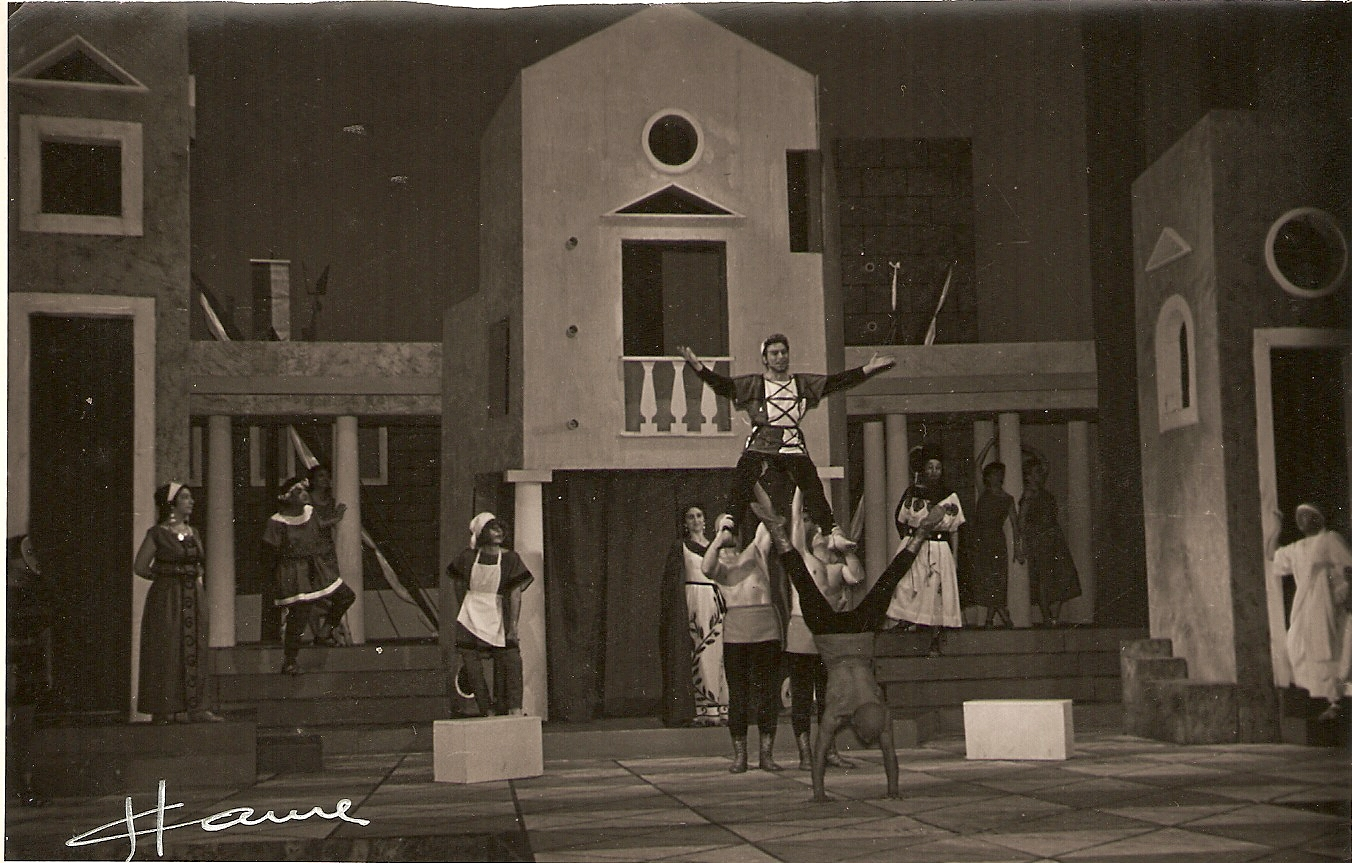
- Scene from the Teatro Nacional Cervantes (1953), during a performance of Menaechmi
- Written by: Plautus
- Characters: Peniculus (Menaechmus's parasite); Menaechmus of Epidamnus; Erotium (Menaechmus's mistress); Cylindrus (Erotium's cook); Sosicles/Menaechmus of (Syracuse); Messenio (slave); Erotium's servant; Menaechmus's wife; Father-in-law of Menaechmus; a doctor; Decio (wife's servant)
- Original language: Latin
- Genre: Roman comedy
- Setting: a street in Epidamnus, before the houses of Menaechmus and Erotium

Premiere
- Date premiered: late 3rd century BC
- Place premiered: Rome?

Menaechmi, a Latin-language play, is often considered Plautus' greatest play. The title is sometimes translated as The Brothers Menaechmus or The Two Menaechmuses.

Menaechmi is a comedy about mistaken identity, involving a set of twins, Menaechmus of Epidamnus and Menaechmus of Syracuse. It incorporates various Roman stock characters including the parasite, the comic courtesan, the comic slave, the domineering wife, the doddering father-in-law and the quack doctor. As with most of Plautus' plays, much of the dialogue was sung.

The play is set in a street in Epidamnus, a city on the coast of what is now Albania. Facing the audience are two houses, that of Menaechmus I and that of Erotium, the prostitute he is courting.

== Plot ==
Prologue: Moschus has twin sons, Menaechmus and Sosicles. Moschus decides to take only one of the twins, Menaechmus, with him on a business trip, while the twins are still young. During the trip, Menaechmus is abducted and adopted by a businessman who lives in Epidamnus, separating the twins. Their father dies of sorrow and their grandfather changes Sosicles' name to Menaechmus (i.e., Menaechmus of Syracuse). When the twins are grown to manhood, Menaechmus of Syracuse sets out in search of his brother. He arrives in Epidamnus, unaware that his twin brother is there also.

Act 1: Here, the brother is first shown to be, with good cause, the despair of his jealous wife. He is seen leaving his house, berating his spouse as a shrew and a harpy, promising that she shall have good cause for her jealousy. He confides to Peniculus, a professional parasite, that he has stolen his wife's mantle and is going to give it to Erotium, a prostitute who lives next door.

The two go to Erotium's door, and the husband presents the mantle with many blandishments. He suggests that a fitting return would include a dinner for himself and Peniculus. Erotium agrees, and the two men go to the Forum for preliminary drinks while the meal is being prepared.

Act 2: Meanwhile, the twin from Syracuse has arrived with Messenio, his slave. The latter warns him of the depravity of Epidamnus, urging an end to the search for his missing brother since their money is nearly gone. His master gives his purse for safekeeping to the slave who continues his warning against the cunning people of Epidamnus "who think nothing of accosting a stranger" and bilking him of his money, when Erotium steps out of her house and endearingly accosts the Syracuse Menaechmus, thinking him to be his brother.

She asks why he hesitates to enter when dinner is ready, and the confused twin asks her, quite formally, what business he has with her. Why, the business of Venus, Erotium replies coyly. Messenio whispers to his master that the lady undoubtedly is a schemer for his money, and asks her if she knows his master. He is Menaechmus, of course, replies Erotium. This amazes the twin, but Messenio explains that spies of the city's thieves probably have learned his name.

Erotium, tiring of what she considers foolery, tells Menaechmus to come into dinner and bring Peniculus. Peniculus, he answers, is in his baggage—and what dinner is she talking about? The dinner he ordered when he presented his wife's mantle, she replies. He first protests vainly that he hasn't any wife and has just arrived in the city, then begins to realize the possibilities of a dinner and a pretty girl. He sends Messenio to the inn, giving him orders to return for his master at sunset.

Act 3: After the meal, he leaves his house with a garland on his head and the mantle over his arm; Erotium has told him to have it re-trimmed. He is chuckling over his luck—dinner, kisses and an expensive mantle—all for nothing, when the irate Peniculus, who has lost the Epidamnus twin in the Forum crowd, meets him and berates him for dining before he could arrive. Quite naturally treated as a stranger, Peniculus angrily rushes to tell the other twin's wife of the stolen mantle.

The Syracuse brother, further baffled because the unknown Peniculus addressed him by his name, is pinching his ear to make sure that he is awake when Erotium's maid comes out and hands him a bracelet to be taken to a goldsmith for repair. He suspects that something is amiss, and hurries off to the inn to tell Messenio of the happy shower of valuables that has been raining upon him.

Act 4: Now the furious wife, told by Peniculus of her man's trick, rushes out of her house just in time to meet her husband returning from the Forum, expecting Erotium's banquet. She tells him to return the mantle or stay out of her house, and the husband goes to Erotium to get it, resolving to buy his sweetheart a better one. He is stupefied when she declares him a liar and a cheat, and tells him that she has already given him both the mantle and her bracelet. So the Epidamnus twin finds the doors of both his wife and mistress slammed in his puzzled face, and goes off to get the counsel of his friends.

The Syracuse Menaechmus returns, the mantle still over his arm, in search of Messenio, who has left the inn. His brother's wife sees him, and assuming him to be her husband, demands that he confess his shame. He asks her of what he should be ashamed—and, furthermore, why she should address a total stranger so. He adds that he didn't steal her mantle, that a lady gave it to him. This is too much for the wife, who calls her father from the house. The father, also assuming that he is the husband, tells him that he must be crazy. This idea seems an excellent means of escape for Menaechmus: he feigns insanity so violently that the father rushes off for a physician, the wife seeks safety in the house, and Menaechmus goes off to resume his hunt for Messenio.

Act 5: As the father comes back with a doctor, the real husband returns. He flies into a rage when his wife and father-in-law add to his troubles by implying that he is quite mad. His anger convinces the doctor of his insanity, and he summons slaves to bind him and take him to an asylum. Just then, Messenio appears, and, thinking the struggling husband his master, overpowers the slave. As a reward he asks for his own freedom. The husband tells Messenio that he doesn't know him, but by all means to consider himself freed; then he begins to suspect he may really be a bit crazy when Messenio tells him that he will return shortly to give him the money he has been safeguarding. Husband Menaechmus is not too addled, however, to profess his ownership of the purse.

The husband goes to Erotium's house in further search of the mantle. The Syracuse twin returns, in his quest of Messenio, at the moment when the servant hurries back with his purse. His master upbraids him for having been gone so long, but the slave protests that he has just saved his owner from ruffians and has been set free. The master is pondering this new muddle when his twin appears from Erotium's house.

The two brothers rub their eyes in bewilderment on seeing each other, but explanations quickly bring recognition. They embrace. The happy master truly sets the slave free, and the brothers decide that the first Menaechmus shall go to live with his twin in Syracuse. Messenio announces an auction in the morning of the husband's goods, everything to go to the block—even the wife, if there be a buyer.

== Metrical scheme ==
Plautus's plays are traditionally divided into five acts; these are referred to below for convenience, since many editions make use of them. However, it is not thought that they go back to Plautus's time, since no manuscript contains them before the 15th century. Also, the acts themselves do not always match the structure of the plays, which is more clearly shown by the variation in metres.

In Plautus's plays the usual pattern is to begin each section with iambic senarii (which were spoken without music), then a scene of music in various metres, and finally a scene in trochaic septenarii, which were apparently recited to the accompaniment of tibiae (a pair of reed pipes). Moore calls this the "ABC succession", where A = iambic senarii, B = other metres, C = trochaic septenarii. However, the ABC order is sometimes varied.

If the A passages (iambic senarii) are taken as starting a section, and the C passages (trochaic septenarii) are taken as ending it, in this play the order of the metrical sections is as follows:

ABBC, ABC, ABC, ABC, ACBCBCBC

Alternatively, following Moore, the sections could be taken as following the two brothers in turn as follows:

ABBC, ABCA, BC, ABCA, CBCBCBC

In first section there are two "B" passages, the first polymetric and the second in mixed iambo-trochaic metres.

Timothy Moore points out that each time Menaechmus I enters the stage, he is accompanied by music; but throughout almost the whole play each entrance of Menaechmus II coincides with iambic senarii, which were unaccompanied. This no doubt helped the audience to distinguish one brother from the other, if they were identically dressed.

=== Prologue ===
Prologue (lines 1–76): ia6 (76 lines)
An actor explains how a merchant in Syracuse in Sicily had twin sons. One of them, on a visit to Tarentum, became separated from his father and was abducted to Epidamnus by a rich childless man, who later drowned in a river, bequeathing his property to the boy. In memory of the lost boy, the grandfather meanwhile renamed the other twin by the same name as the lost one. This second twin has now come to Epidamnus to make enquiry about his brother.

=== Menaechmus I arranges dinner ===
Act 1.1 (77–109): ia6 (33 lines)
A parasite, Peniculus (the name means a sponge used for wiping tables) is waiting outside Menaechmus's house in the hope of an invitation to dinner.
Act 1.2 (110–119): polymetric song (25 lines)
The young man Menaechmus emerges quarrelling with his wife through the door, threatening to divorce her if she continues nagging.
Act 1.2 (119–134): mixed iambic and trochaic metres (16 lines)
He says she is spoiled (tr8), and lists all the presents he buys her (ia4). He threatens to dine with a prostitute instead of her (tr7). Then he tells the audience that he has stolen his wife's cloak as a present for his girlfriend.
Act 1.2–1.4 (135–225): tr7 (87 lines)
The one-eyed Peniculus accosts Menaechmus and exchanges banter, still hoping to get a dinner. They approach the door of Erotium, the prostitute, and knock. Erotium comes out and there is more banter. Menaechmus gives her the cloak, and asks her to prepare dinner for all of them; meanwhile he and Peniculus will go to the market to get a drink. When they have gone, Erotium calls out her cook Cylindrus and orders him to go to buy some food for dinner.

=== Menaechmus II eats the dinner ===
Act 2.1–2.2 (226–350): ia6 (124 lines)
Menaechmus II now enters the street, along with his prudent slave Messenio, who advises him that after six years searching for news of his brother all over the Mediterranean, their purse is almost empty. He warns him to watch his money since Epidamnus is full of voluptuaries, drinkers, tricksters, conmen, and the most charming prostitutes in the world. Menaechmus asks for the purse for safekeeping, which Messenio gives to him. – They now meet Cylindrus the cook, who addresses Menaechmus by name: each thinks the other is mad, but Messenio warns that he is probably a conman.
Act 2.3 (351–368): song
mostly anapaests and some iambs (18 lines)
The prostitute Erotium comes out from her house. She gives instructions to her staff, then welcomes Menaechmus II and invites him in.
Act 2.3–3.1 (369–465): tr7 (93 lines)
Menaechmus II is confused. He is surprised that Erotium knows his home city and father's name, but he denies knowing a Peniculus, or having brought a cloak, or having been in Epidamnus before. Nonetheless he decides to go in, against Messenio's advice that this is a trick. He hands over his money to Messenio for safekeeping and tells him to come back for him later. He goes inside with Erotium. Messenio and the porters depart.

Peniculus returns, having lost track of Menaechmus I in the forum. He is dismayed to see Menaechmus II exiting Erotium's house, wearing the garland customarily put on at a banquet.

=== Menaechmus II steals the cloak ===
Act 3.2–4.1 (466–570): ia6 (102 lines)
Menaechmus II comes out with the cloak, which Erotium has lent him so that he can have it altered; when the door is shut, he congratulates himself on his good fortune and declares that he intends to keep it. Peniculus accosts him. When Menaechmus II denies knowing him, an altercation ensues and Menaechmus insults Peniculus. Peniculus says he will pay Menaechmus back for tricking him out of the meal.

A maid comes out and hands Menaechmus II a bracelet, saying that Erotium is asking him to have some gold added to it. Before going in, she cheekily requests him to buy her some gold earrings too. Menaechmus II goes off to find Messenio, throwing down his garland on the opposite side to confuse any pursuers.

Peniculus and Menaechmus I's wife emerge from his house: Peniculus has told her about the cloak. He sees the garland on the ground. Just then Menaechmus I arrives.

Act 4.2 (571–603): song: bacchiac, anapaestic, trochaic, iambic
Menaechmus I now enters from the forum side of the stage. He sings how he has been very annoyingly delayed by a court case in which he was obliged to represent an obviously guilty client. In a series of eleven rhyming iambic quaternarii he recounts his misfortunes. His wife and Peniculus overhear him and comment (an7).
Act 4.2 (cont.)–4.3 (604–700): tr7 (97 lines)
Realising he is too late for Erotium, Menaechmus I makes as if to enter his own house, but is stopped by his wife and Peniculus. There is a quarrel. The wife accuses him of stealing her cloak. He says he did not steal, only borrowed it. She tells him he may not come in until he brings it back. She goes inside without giving Peniculus any reward. Peniculus goes to the forum in annoyance.

Menaechmus I now knocks on Erotium's door. She is at first welcoming, but when he asks for the cloak back and denies having taken the bracelet she grows angry and refuses to admit him. She goes inside, and Menaechmus I goes off to consult his friends.

=== Menaechmus II is judged mad ===
Act 5.1 (701–752): ia6 (52 lines)
Menaechmus II now returns. Mistaking him for her husband, Menaechmus I's wife quarrels with him for wearing her cloak. Growing angry, she sends a slave to fetch her father. Menaechmus II indignantly denies stealing her cloak or bracelet.
Act 5.2 (753–774): polymetric song (mostly bacchiacs) (22 lines)
The wife's father arrives, walking slowly. He asks himself what the problem can be.
Act 5.2 (775–871): tr7 (62 lines)
Menaechmus I's wife complains to her father about her husband's behaviour, but he is unsympathetic. He says that as long as he gives her food and maidservants, she has no right to rule him. When questioned, Menaechmus II denies having ever set foot in her house. The old man accuses him of being mad, and in response Menaechmus II starts raving as if he really is mad.

=== Menaechmus I is judged mad ===
Act 5.2–5.4 (872–898): ia6 (26 lines)
The old man goes off in fear and Menaechmus II makes good his escape towards the port.

The old man hobbles back, saying he has summoned a doctor, who arrives shortly afterwards.

Act 5.5 (899–965): tr7 (62 lines)
Menaechmus I arrives complaining about the ungrateful behaviour of Peniculus and Erotium. The doctor questions him, and Menaechmus grows infuriated and begins talking like a madman. The doctor tells the old man to fetch four slaves to tie Menaechmus I up and bring him to his clinic. They go off, leaving Menaechmus I alone complaining of his troubles.

=== Menaechmus I is seized ===
Act 5.6 (966–985): polymetric song
mixed bacchiacs, iambics and other metres (20 lines)
Messenio comes back from the inn to fetch his master from Erotium's house. Singing, he congratulates himself on being a trustworthy servant.
Act 5.6 (cont.)–5.7 (986–987): ia8 (2 lines)
Messenio prepares to knock on Erotium's door, hoping he has not come too late (ia8).
Act 5.6 (cont.)–5.7 (988–994): tr7 (7 lines)
Suddenly the old man comes out of the other house with four slaves. He orders them to seize Menaechmus I and carry him immediately to the doctor's surgery (tr7).

=== Menaechmus I is rescued ===
Act 5.7 (cont.) (995–1007): ia8 (9 lines), ia4 (5 lines), tr8 (1 line)
Menaechmus I protests vigorously and calls for help (ia8). Messenio also calls for help (ia4). Menaechmus I begs for help again (tr8).
Act 5.7 (cont.)–5.8 (1008–1059): tr7 (53 lines)
Messenio gallantly rushes to his aid and together they beat off the slaves, who run away. Messenio then begs Menaechmus I for his freedom, which the puzzled Menaechmus grants. Messenio then departs to fetch the purse to give to Menaechmus.

Meanwhile Menaechmus I, declaring that he will be happy to steal Messenio's money if he is given the purse, goes into Erotium's house.

As soon as he has gone, Menaechmus II arrives. When Messenio tells him he has just rescued him, Menaechmus II vehemently denies that he has just given Messenio his freedom.

=== The brothers meet ===
Act 5.9 (1060–1062): ia8 (3 lines)
Menaechmus I emerges from Erotium's house, strenuously denying that he took away her cloak.
Act 5.9 (cont.) (1063–1162): tr7 (97 lines)
The brothers meet, to their mutual astonishment. Messenio is unsure which of them is his master. Menaechmus II offers Messenio his freedom if he can prove that Menaechmus I is his twin brother. When Menaechmus II says that Menaechmus I was originally called Sosicles, the evidence is complete. Messenio is granted his freedom. Menaechmus I says he wishes to auction his property, including his wife, and return to Syracuse with his brother.

== Adaptations and influences ==
Menaechmi was among the twelve plays by Plautus rediscovered in manuscript form around 1428 by the humanist, bishop and theologian Nicholas of Cusa. It was first printed in 1472. The play was chosen to be publicly performed in Italian translation at Ferrara on 25 January 1486. This performance was part of several carnival entertainments commissioned by Duke Ercole I d'Este to celebrate the recent betrothal of his daughter Isabella d'Este; as many as thousands are thought to have watched the show, which constituted the first public performance of classical theater in Ferrara and possibly the first ever modern performance of classical theater in vernacular translation. Since then, it was frequently staged in vernacular translation throughout Italy, for example in Bologna (1491), Cesena (1492), Milan (1493), Mantua (1502) and Rome (1502). We know that the great poet Ludovico Ariosto worked on his own translation of Menaechmi (version now lost), and used it as inspiration for his play La Cassaria (1508). It inspired several spinoffs, for example Bernardo Dovizi's La Calandra, Gian Giorgio Trissino's I Simillimi and Agnolo Firenzuola's I Lucidi.

The play was the major source for William Shakespeare's The Comedy of Errors. Shakespeare's work was in turn adapted for the musical theatre by Rodgers and Hart in The Boys from Syracuse and as the 1954 opera Double-Trouble by Richard Mohaupt (Libretto: Roger Maren).

A similar line of influence was Carlo Goldoni's 1747 play I due gemelli veneziani ("The two Venetian twins") (also adapted as The Venetian Twins in 1979). Shakespeare's Twelfth Night also features mistaken twins, the sister dressed as a boy.

== Translations ==
- William Warner, 1595
- Henry Thomas Riley, 1912: Menaechmi (full text)
- Paul Nixon, 1916–38
- Edward C. Weist and Richard W. Hyde, 1942
- Palmer Bovie, 1962
- E. F. Watling, 1965
- Erich Segal, 1996
- Deena Berg and Douglass Parker, 1999
- David M. Christenson, 2010
- Dr. Richard E. Prior, Furman University, Classics
- Lionel Casson, 1960–63
- Wolfang de Melo, 2011
