= The Decameron =

14th-century collection of stories by Giovanni Boccaccio

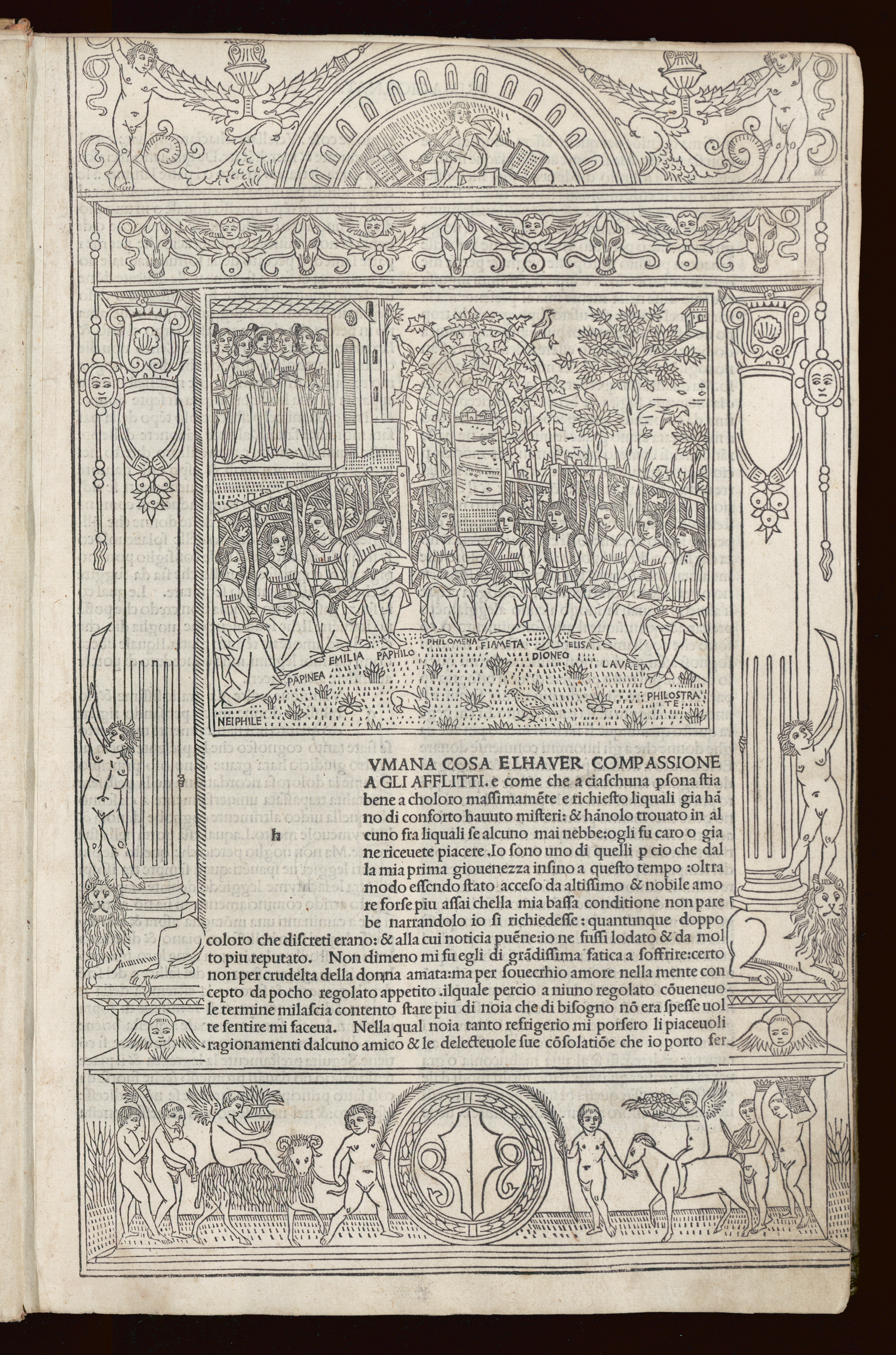
- Illustration from a ca. 1492 edition of Il Decameron published in Venice
- Author: Giovanni Boccaccio
- Original title: Decamerone
- Translator: John Payne; Richard Aldington; James McMullen Rigg; Mark Musa; Peter Bondanella; others
- Language: Italian (Florentine)
- Genre: Frame story, short story
- Publisher: Filippo and Bernardo Giunti
- Publication place: Italy
- English publication date: 1620
- OCLC: 58887280
- Dewey Decimal: 853.1
- LC Class: PQ4267

The Decameron (/dɪˈkæmərən/ dih-KAM-ər-ən; Italian: Decameron [deˈkaːmeron, dekameˈrɔn, -ˈron] or Decamerone [dekameˈroːne]), subtitled Prince Galehaut (Old Italian: Prencipe Galeotto [ˈprentʃipe ɡaleˈɔtto, ˈprɛn-]), is a collection of short stories by the 14th-century Italian author Giovanni Boccaccio (1313–1375). It is sometimes nicknamed l'Umana commedia ("The Human Comedy"), as it was Boccaccio that dubbed Dante Alighieri's Comedy "Divine". The book is structured as a frame story containing 100 tales told by a group of seven young women and three young men; they shelter in a secluded villa just outside Florence in order to escape the Black Death, which was afflicting the city. The epidemic is likely what Boccaccio used for the basis of the book which was thought to be written between 1348 and 1353. The various tales of love in The Decameron range from the erotic to the tragic. Tales of wit, practical jokes, and life lessons also contribute to the mosaic. In addition to its literary value and widespread influence (for example on Chaucer's The Canterbury Tales), it provides a document of life at the time. Written in the vernacular of the Florentine language, it is considered a masterpiece of early Italian prose.

== Title ==
The book's primary title exemplifies Boccaccio's fondness for Greek philology: Decameron combines Greek δέκα, déka ("ten") and ἡμέρα, hēméra ("day") to mean "ten-day [event]", referring to the period in which the characters of the frame story tell their tales.

Hexaemeron (Six Days, literally The Six-Day [Work]) was a familiar title in Boccaccio's day. It was commonly used for sermons and treatises commenting on the biblical story of the creation of the world, which took place in six days (and was therefore referred to as the Hexaemeron or Six-day work). The tradition goes back to Patristic literature, notably Ambrose of Milan’s Hexaemeron also known as Exameron (ca. 378 C.E.). In thirteenth-century Italy Bonaventure still authored Collationes in Hexaemeron (1273, literally Talks on the Six Days) in the same tradition. Exploring the links between the Decameron and hexaemeral literature's exposition of creation usually structured in six chapters (one for each day), scholarship pointed out that Boccaccio’s ten narrators intervene following a cataclysmic outbreak of plague as though they were metaphorically re-creating a world through their stories, day after day. The mischievous critique of monastic culture contained in Boccaccio’s book also led some to wonder whether the erudite title Decameron might not comprise a parodistic dimension.

Boccaccio's subtitle, Prencipe Galeotto, refers to Galehaut, a fictional knight sometimes called haut prince (high prince) in the 13th-century Lancelot-Grail. Galehaut was a close friend of Lancelot, but an enemy of King Arthur. When Galehaut learned that Lancelot loved Arthur's wife, Guinevere, he set aside his own ardor for Lancelot in order to arrange a meeting between his friend and Guinevere. At this meeting the Queen first kisses Lancelot, and so begins their love affair. Through this notorious episode, Galeotto had become the epitome of the romantic go-between in the Italian imagination – a Cupid able to bind two hearts. By subtitling his book Prencipe Galeotto, Boccaccio signals that he hopes his stories will bring young lovers together, providing them with an opportunity to use storytelling as a vehicle of flirtation (as the youths in the Decameron's frame story do) and ultimately fall in love. This reading finds confirmation in a memorable passage from Dante's Divine Comedy where two lovers explain they have fallen madly in love while reading the Lancelot-and-Guinevere story to one another, so that, in a sense, the romance had functioned as their very own Galehaut or "romantic go-between". The idea was encapsulated in Dante's oft-cited verse: "Galeotto fu ’l libro e chi lo scrisse" ("The book and its author was our Galeotto", Inferno, V, 137), crystallizing at once the image of Galeotto-as-book and book-as-love-dart. The verse is spoken in Hell, in the circle of the lustful, by Francesca da Rimini as she tries to justify her forbidden liaison with her half-brother and paramour Paolo Malatesta, blaming the Lancelot-and-Guinevere story for impassioning them to sex.

The description of Galehaut's munificence and savoir-faire amidst this intrigue impressed Boccaccio. By invoking the name Prencipe Galeotto in the alternative title to Decameron, Boccaccio also alludes to a sentiment he expresses in the Proem of the Decameron about the aim of his text: his compassion for women deprived of free speech and social liberty, confined to their homes and, at times, lovesick. He contrasts this life with that of the men free to enjoy hunting, fishing, riding, and falconry.

== Frame story ==
Miniature by Taddeo Crivelli in a manuscript of c. 1467 from Ferrara (Bodleian Library, Oxford)

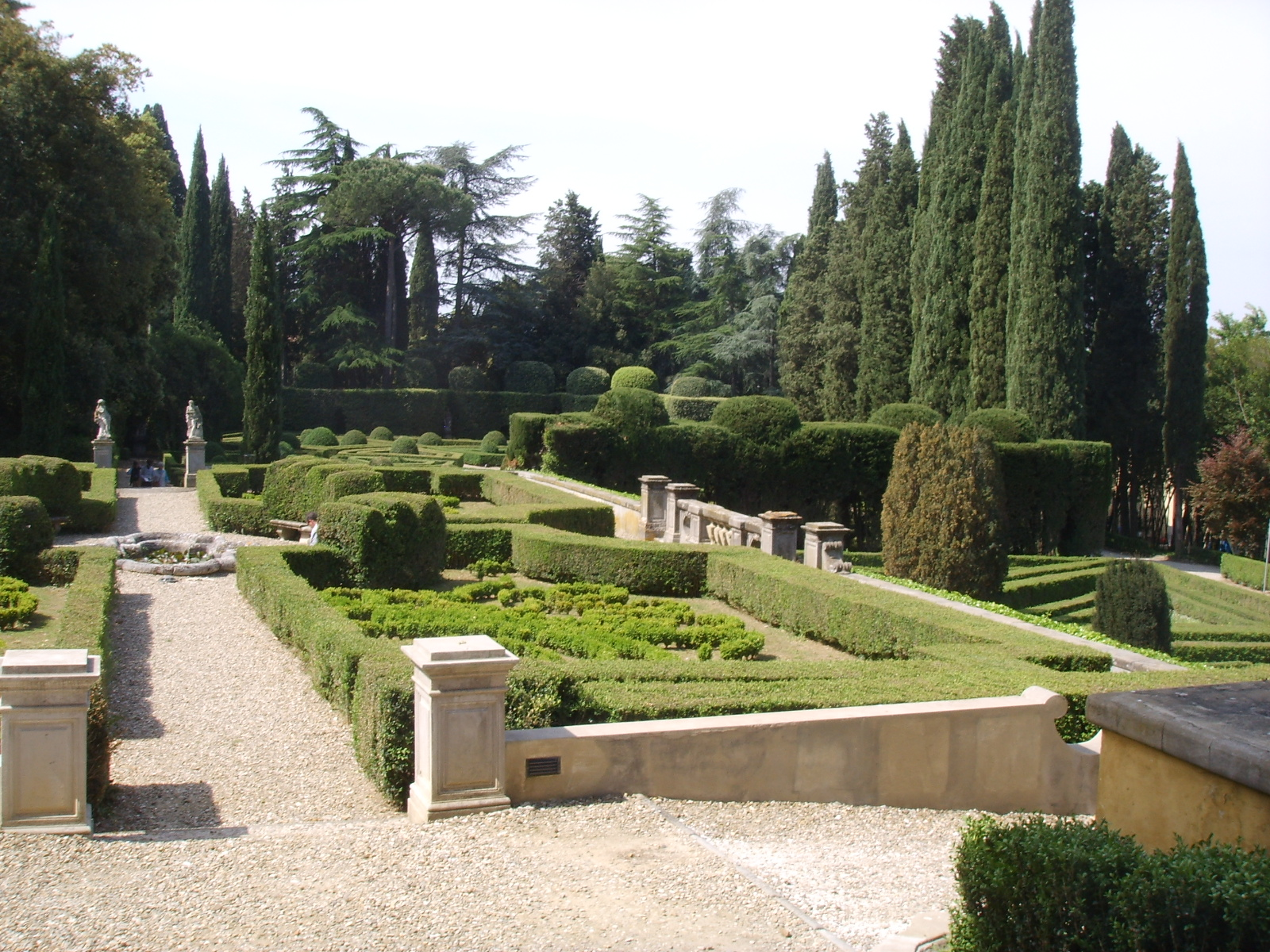
The garden of the Villa Schifanoia in Fiesole, Firenze

In Italy during the time of the Black Death, a group of seven young women and three young men flee from plague-ridden Florence to a deserted villa in the countryside of Fiesole for two weeks. To pass the evenings, each member of the party tells a story each night, except for one day per week for chores, and the holy days during which they do no work at all, resulting in ten nights of storytelling over the course of two weeks. Thus, by the end of the fortnight they have told 100 stories.

Each of the ten characters is charged as King or Queen of the company for one of the ten days in turn. This charge extends to choosing the theme of the stories for that day, and all but two days have topics assigned: examples of the power of fortune; examples of the power of human will; love tales that end tragically; love tales that end happily; clever replies that save the speaker; tricks that women play on men; tricks that people play on each other in general; examples of virtue. Due to his wit, Dioneo, who usually tells the tenth tale each day, is allowed to select any topic he wishes.

Many commentators have argued that Dioneo expresses the views of Boccaccio himself. Each day also includes a short introduction and conclusion to continue the frame of the tales by describing other daily activities besides story-telling. These framing interludes frequently include transcriptions of Italian folk songs. The interactions among tales in a day, or across days, as Boccaccio spins variations and reversals of previous material, forms a whole and not just a collection of stories. Recurring plots of the stories include mocking the lust and greed of the clergy; female lust and ambition on par with male lust and ambition; tensions in Italian society between the new wealthy commercial class and noble families; and the perils and adventures of traveling merchants.

== Analysis ==
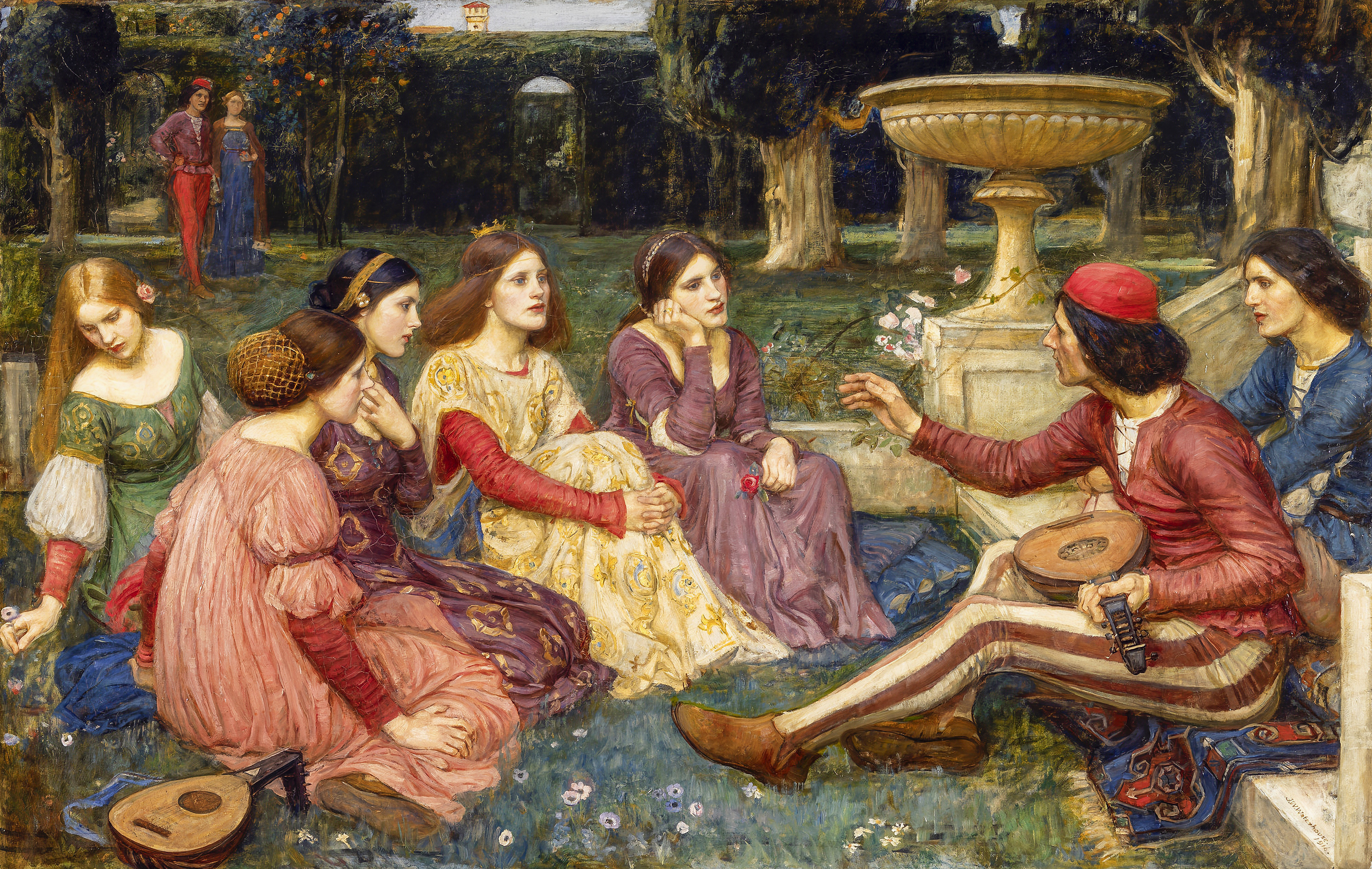
A Tale from the Decameron (1916) by John William Waterhouse

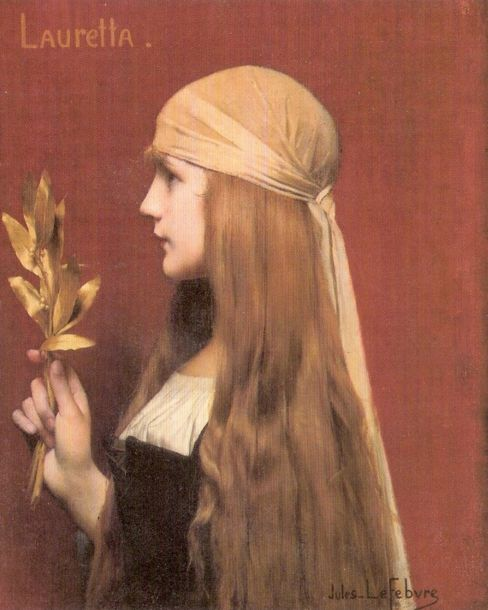
Lauretta, one of the narrators of the Decameron, painted by Jules Joseph Lefebvre

Beyond the unity provided by the frame narrative, the Decameron provides a unity in philosophical outlook. Throughout runs the common medieval theme of Lady Fortune, and how quickly one can rise and fall through the external influences of the "Wheel of Fortune". Boccaccio had been educated in the tradition of Dante's Divine Comedy, which used various levels of allegory to show the connections between the literal events of the story and the Christian message. However, the Decameron uses Dante's model not to educate the reader but to satirize this method of learning. The Catholic Church, priests, and religious belief become the satirical source of comedy throughout. This was part of a wider historical trend in the aftermath of the Black Death which saw widespread discontent with the church. Many details of the Decameron are infused with a medieval sense of numerological and mystical significance. For example, it is widely believed that the seven young women are meant to represent the Four Cardinal Virtues (Prudence, Justice, Temperance, and Fortitude) and the Three Theological Virtues (Faith, Hope, and Charity). It is further supposed that the three men represent the classical Greek tripartite division of the soul (Reason, Spirit, and Appetite, see Book IV of Republic). Boccaccio himself notes that the names he gives for these ten characters are in fact pseudonyms chosen as "appropriate to the qualities of each". The Italian names of the seven women, in the same (most likely significant) order as given in the text, are Pampinea, Fiammetta, Filomena, Emilia, Lauretta, Neifile, and Elissa. The men, in order, are Panfilo, Filostrato, and Dioneo.

== Literary sources ==
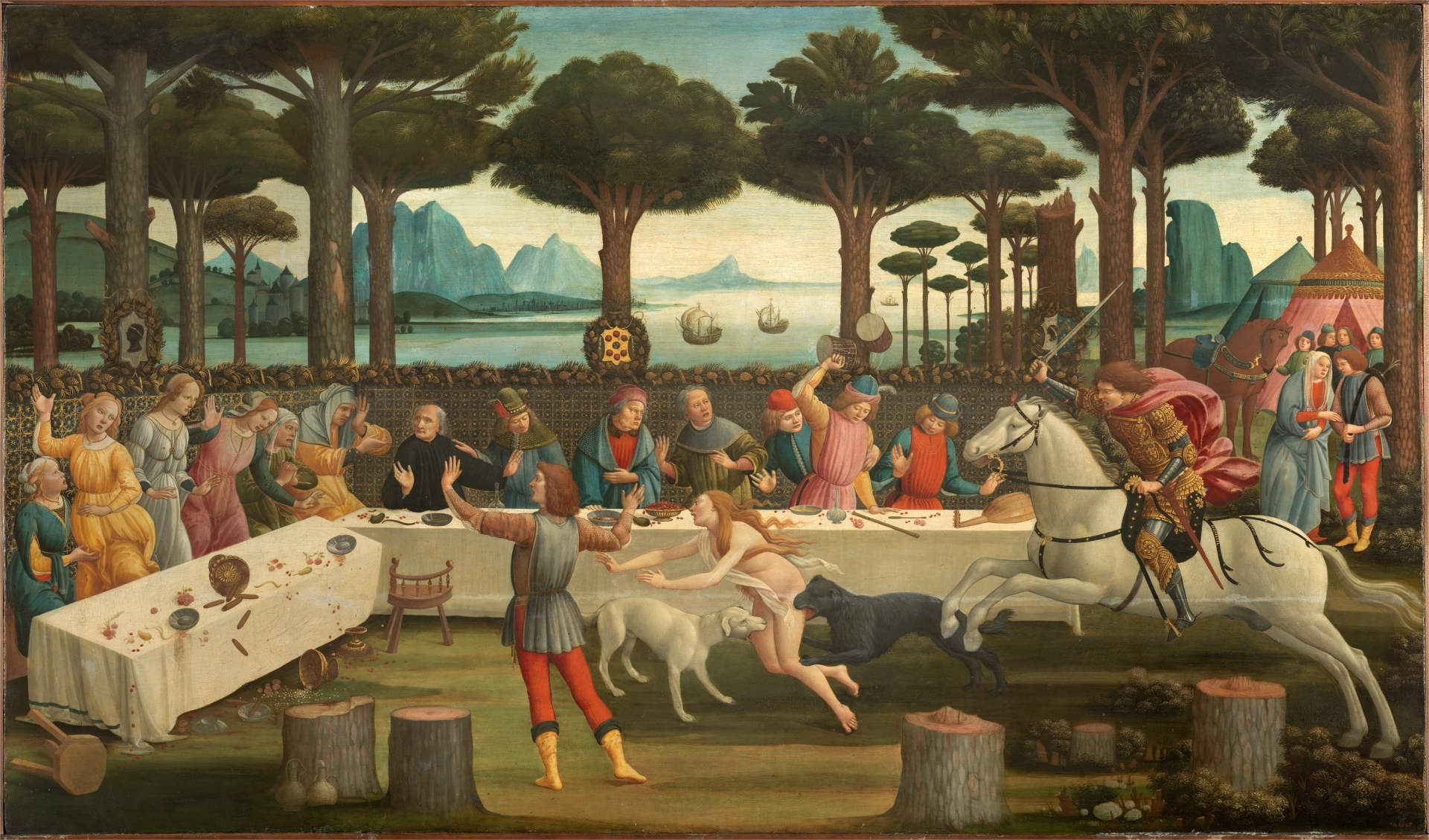
The Banquet in the Pine Forest (1482/3) is the third painting in Sandro Botticelli's series The Story of Nastagio degli Onesti, which illustrates events from the Eighth Story of the Fifth Day.

Boccaccio borrowed the plots of almost all his stories (just as later writers borrowed from him). Although he consulted only French, Italian and Latin sources, some of the tales have their origin in such far-off lands as India, the Middle East, Spain, and other places. Some were already centuries old. For example, part of the tale of Andreuccio of Perugia (Day II, Story 5) originated in 2nd-century Ephesus (in the Ephesian Tale). Even the description of the central motivating event of the narrative, the Black Plague (which Boccaccio surely witnessed), is not original, but is based on a description in the Historia gentis Langobardorum of Paul the Deacon, who lived in the 8th century. Boccaccio also drew on Ovid's works as inspiration. He has been called "the Italian Ovid" because of his writing.

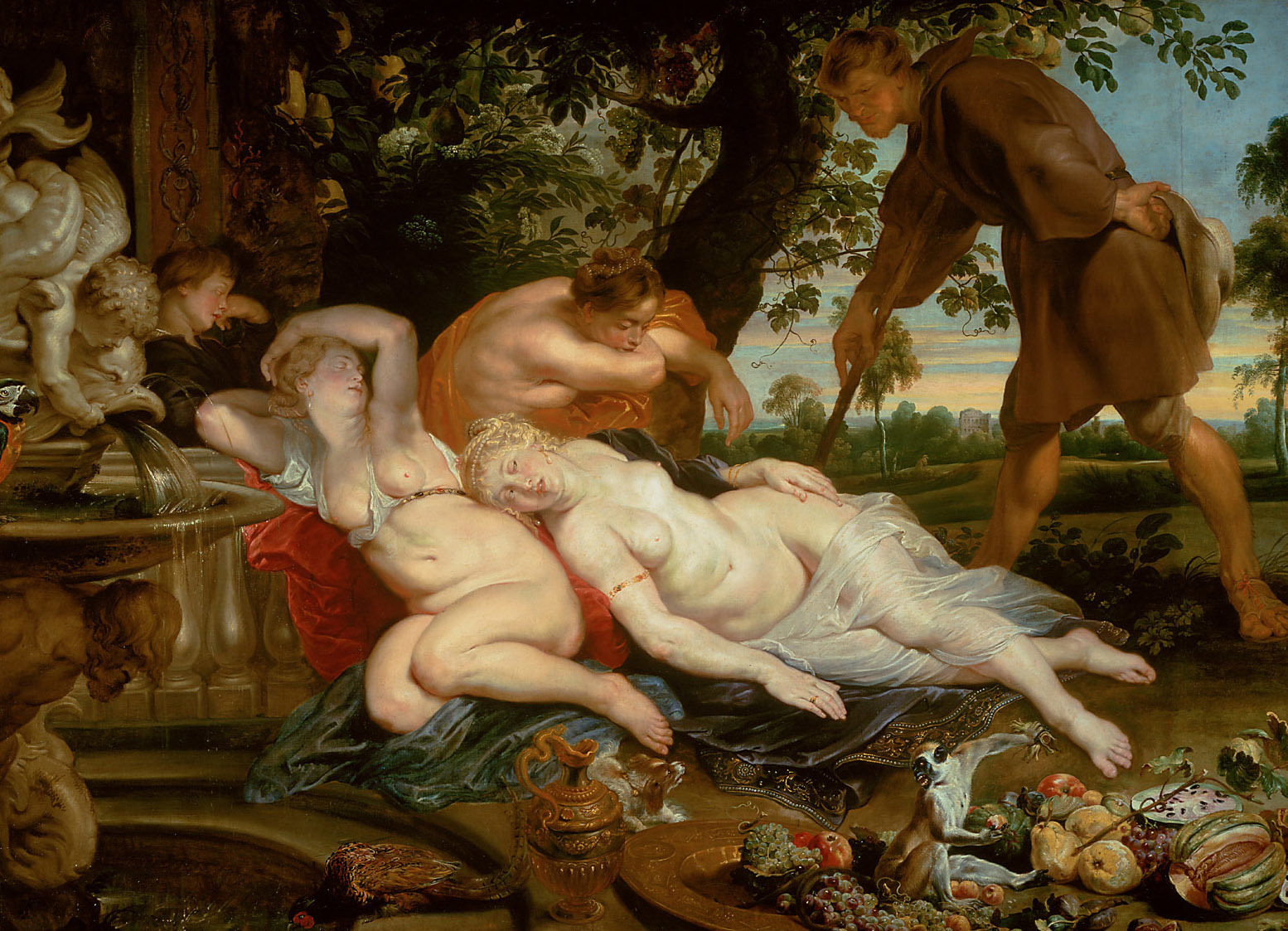
The story of Cimone and Efigenia (c. 1617), the First Story from the Fifth Day, work by Peter Paul Rubens, Frans Snyders and Jan Wildens

The fact that Boccaccio borrowed the story lines that make up most of the Decameron does not mean he mechanically reproduced them. Most of the stories take place in the 14th century and have been sufficiently updated to the author's time that a reader may not know that they had been written centuries earlier or in a foreign culture. Also, Boccaccio often combined two or more unrelated tales into one (such as in II, 2 and VII, 7).

Moreover, many of the characters actually existed, such as Giotto di Bondone, Guido Cavalcanti, Saladin, and King William II of Sicily. Scholars have even been able to verify the existence of less famous characters, such as the tricksters Bruno and Buffalmacco and their victim Calandrino. Still other fictional characters are based on real people, such as the Madonna Fiordaliso from tale II, 5, who is derived from a Madonna Flora who lived in the red light district of Naples. Boccaccio also wrote about French physician Gillette de Narbonne, calling her ‘Donna Medica’; Alfred Duru and Henri Chivot wrote a comic opera about her called Gillette de Narbonne. Boccaccio often intentionally muddled historical (II, 3) and geographical (V, 2) facts for his narrative purposes. Within the tales of the Decameron, the principal characters are usually developed through their dialogue and actions, so that by the end of the story they seem real and their actions logical given their context.

Another of Boccaccio's frequent techniques was to make already existing tales more complex. A clear example of this is in tale IX, 6, which was also used by Chaucer in his "The Reeve's Tale", which more closely follows the original French source than does Boccaccio's version. In the Italian version, the host's wife and the two young male visitors occupy all three beds and she also creates an explanation of the happenings of the evening. Both elements are Boccaccio's invention and make for a more complex version than either Chaucer's version or the French source (a fabliau by Jean de Boves).

== Papal censorship ==
Despite its enduring popularity, the Decameron's overtly anti-clerical stances frequently brought the work into conflict with the Catholic Church. The first instance occurred in 1497 when the Dominican Friar Girolamo Savonarola incited a bonfire of 'sinful' art and literature in the centre of Florence known later as the "Bonfire of the Vanities". The Decameron was among the works known to have been burned that day.

More official clerical challenges would follow upon the creation of the Index Librorum Prohibitorum. Instituted by Pope Paul IV in 1559, the Index was a list of texts that were officially anathema to the Catholic Church; Boccaccio's Decameron was among the original texts included. Despite this, the book continued to circulate and grow in popularity, prompting Pope Gregory XIII to commission a revised edition in 1573 in which the clergymen were replaced with secular people. Even this would prove to be too immoral for Pope Sixtus V who commissioned another revision during his time as cardinal resulting in the 1582 edition by Salviati.

== Translations into English ==
The Decameron's individual tales were translated into English early on (such as poet William Walter's 1525 Here begynneth y[e] hystory of Tytus & Gesyppus translated out of Latyn into Englysshe by Wyllyam Walter, somtyme seruaunte to Syr Henry Marney, a translation of tale X.viii), or served as source material for English authors such as Chaucer to rework. The table below lists all attempts at a complete English translation of the book. The information on pre-1971 translations is compiled from the G. H. McWilliam's introduction to his own 1971 translation.

=== Incomplete ===
Year	Translator	Omissions	Comments	Full text
1620	By "I. F.", attributed to John Florio	Omits the Proemio and Conclusione dell’autore. Replaces tale III.x with an innocuous tale taken from François de Belleforest’s “Histoires tragiques”, concluding that it “was commended by all the company, ... because it was free from all folly and obscoeneness.” Tale IX.x is also modified, while tale V.x loses its homosexual innuendo.	“Magnificent specimen of Jacobean prose, [but] its high-handed treatment of the original text produces a number of shortcomings” says G. H. McWilliam, translator of the 1971 Penguin edition (see below). Based not on Boccaccio's Italian original, but on Antoine Le Maçon’s 1545 French translation and Lionardo Salviati's 1582 Italian edition which replaced ‘offensive’ words, sentences or sections with asterisks or altered text (in a different font). The 1940 Heritage Press edition of this 1620 translation restores the two omitted tales by inserting anonymously translated modern English versions.	Day 1 to 5 Day 6 to 10
1702	Anonymous, attributed to John Savage	Omits Proemio and Conclusione dell’autore. Replaces tale III.x with the tale contained within the Introduction to the Fourth Day. Tale IX.x is bowdlerised, but possibly because the translator was working from faulty sources, rather than deliberately.	---	
1741	Anonymous, posthumously identified as Dr. Charles Balguy	Omits Proemio and Conclusione dell’autore. Explicitly omits tales III.x and IX.x, and removed the homosexual innuendo in tale V.x: “Boccace is so licentious in many places, that it requires some management to preserve his wit and humour, and render him tolerably decent. This I have attempted with the loss of two novels, which I judged incapable of such treatment; and am apprehensive, it may still be thought by some people, that I have rather omitted too little, than too much.”	Reissued several times with small or large modifications, sometimes without acknowledgement of the original translator. The 1804 reissue makes further expurgations. The 1822 reissue adds half-hearted renditions of III.x and IX.x, retaining the more objectionable passages in the original Italian, with a footnote to III.x that it is “impossible to render ... into tolerable English”, and giving Mirabeau’s French translation instead. The 1872 reissue is similar, but makes translation errors in parts of IX.x. The 1895 reissue (introduced by Alfred Wallis), in four volumes, cites Mr. S. W. Orson as making up for the omissions of the 1741 original, although part of III.x is given in Antoine Le Maçon’s French translation, belying the claim that it is a complete English translation, and IX.x is modified, replacing Boccaccio’s direct statements with innuendo.	
1855	W. K. Kelly	Omits Proemio and Conclusione dell’autore. Includes tales III.x and IX.x, claiming to be "COMPLETE, although a few passages are in French or Italian", but as in 1822, leaves parts of III.x in the original Italian with a French translation in a footnote, and omits several key sentences entirely from IX.x.	---	
1896	Anonymous	Part of tale III.x again given in French, without footnote or explanation. Tale IX.x translated anew, but Boccaccio's phrase "l’umido radicale" is rendered "the humid radical" rather than "the moist root".	Falsely claims to be a "New Translation from the Italian" and the "First complete English Edition", when it is only a reworking of earlier versions with the addition of what McWilliam calls "vulgarly erotic overtones" in some stories.	
1903	James Macmullen Rigg	Once more, part of tale III.x is left in the original Italian with a footnote “No apology is needed for leaving, in accordance with precedent, the subsequent detail untranslated”.	McWiliam praises its elegant style in sections of formal language, but complains it is spoiled by an obsolete vocabulary in more vernacular sections. Reissued frequently, including in Everyman's Library (1930) with introduction by Edward Hutton.	Volume I VolumeII
1930	Frances Winwar	Omits the Proemio.	Introduction by Burton Rascoe. First American translation, and first English-language translation by a woman. "Fairly accurate and eminently readable, [but] fails to do justice to those more ornate and rhetorical passages" says McWilliam. Originally issued in expensive 2-volume set by the Limited Editions Club of New York City, and in cheaper general circulation edition only in 1938.	

=== Complete ===
Year	Translator	Publishers and Comments	Full text
1886	John Payne	The first truly complete translation in English, with copious footnotes to explain Boccaccio's double-entendres and other references. Introduction by Sir Walter Raleigh. Published by the Villon Society by private subscription for private circulation. Stands and falls on its "splendidly scrupulous but curiously archaic ... sonorous and self-conscious Pre-Raphaelite vocabulary" according to McWilliam, who gives as an example from tale III.x: "Certes, father mine, this same devil must be an ill thing and an enemy in very deed of God, for that it irketh hell itself, let be otherwhat, when he is put back therein." 1925 Edition by Horace Liveright Inc. US, then reprinted in Oct 1928, Dec 1928, April 1929, Sept 1929, Feb 1930. 1930. Reissued in the Modern Library, 1931. Updated editions have been published in 1982, edited by Charles S. Singleton, and in 2004, edited by Cormac Ó Cuilleanáin.	The Project Gutenberg eBook of The Decameron of Giovanni Boccaccio
1930	Richard Aldington	Like Winwar, first issued in expensive and lavishly illustrated edition. "Littered with schoolboy errors ... plain and threadbare, so that anyone reading it might be forgiven for thinking that Boccaccio was a kind of sub-standard fourteenth-century Somerset Maugham" says McWilliam.	
1972, 1995	George Henry McWilliam	The first translation into contemporary English, intended for general circulation. Penguin Classics edition. The second edition (1995) includes a 150-page detailed explanation of the historical, linguistic, and nuanced reasoning behind the new translation. Its in-depth study exemplifies the care and consideration given to the original text and meaning. The volume includes a biography of the author and a detailed history of the book's composition and setting.	
1977	Peter Bondanella and Mark Musa	W. W. Norton & Company	
1993	Guido Waldman	Oxford University Press.	
2008	J. G. Nichols	Everyman's Library.and Vintage Classics	
2013	Wayne A. Rebhorn	W. W. Norton & Company. Publishers Weekly called Rebhorn's translation "strikingly modern" and praised its "accessibility". In an interview with The Wall Street Journal Rebhorn stated that he started translating the work in 2006 after deciding that the translations he was using in his classroom needed improvement. Rebhorn cited errors in the 1977 translation as one of the reasons for the new translation. Peter Bondanella, one of the translators of the 1977 edition, stated that new translations build on previous ones and that the error cited would be corrected in future editions of his translation.	

== Notable early translations ==
It can be generally said that Petrarch's version in Rerum senilium libri XVII, 3, included in a letter he wrote to his friend Boccaccio, was to serve as a source for all the many versions that circulated around Europe, including the translations of the very Decameron into Catalan (first recorded translation into a foreign language, anonymously hand-written in Sant Cugat in 1429; later retranslated by Bernat Metge), French and Spanish.

The famous first tale (I, 1) of the notorious Ser Ciappelletto was later translated into Latin by Olimpia Fulvia Morata and translated again by Voltaire.

== Adaptations ==
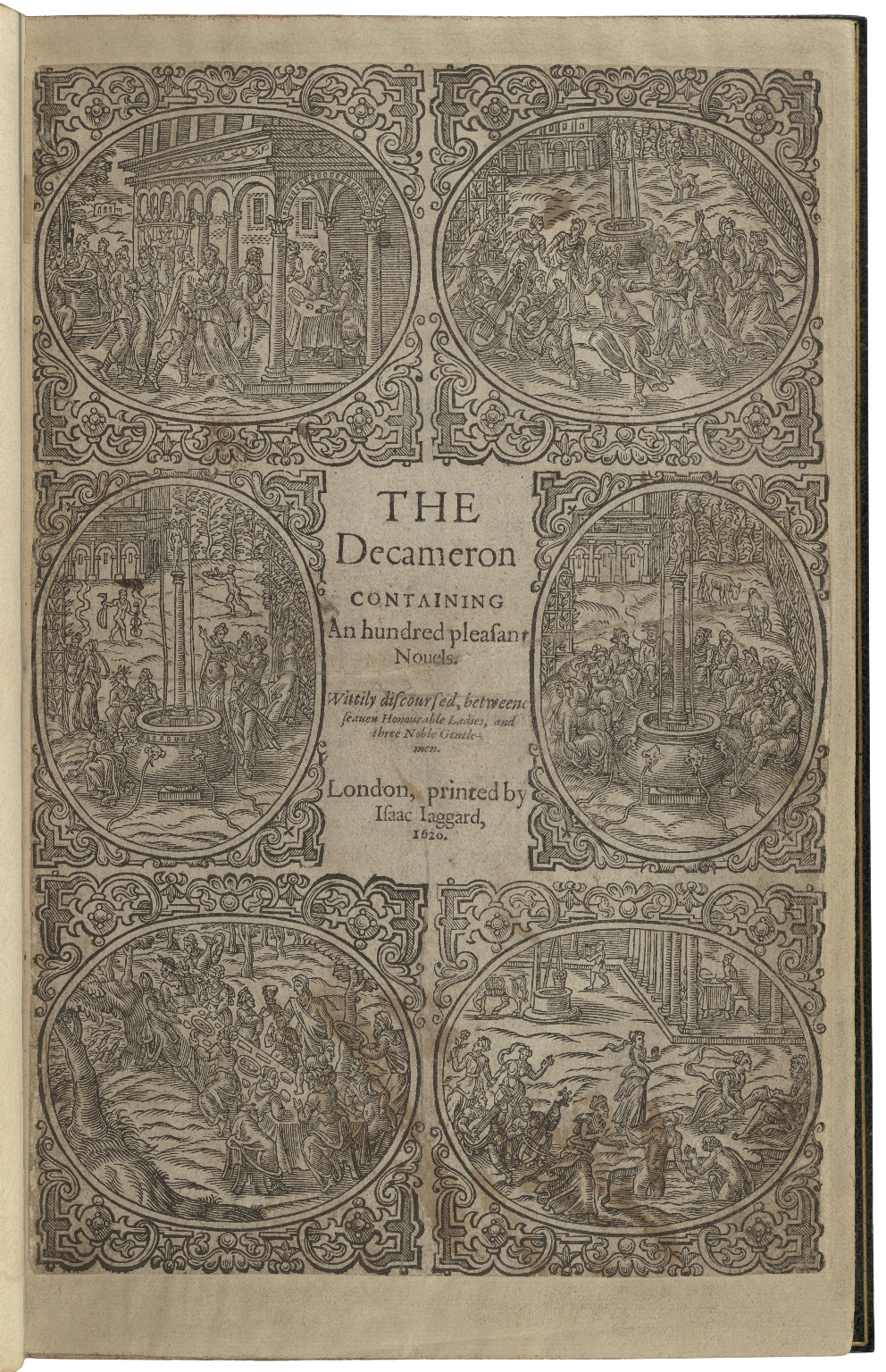
A 1620 edition of the Decameron, printed by Isaac Jaggard

=== Theatre ===
- William Shakespeare's 1605 play All's Well That Ends Well is based on tale III, 9. Shakespeare probably first read a French translation of the tale in William Painter's Palace of Pleasure.
- Posthumus's wager on Imogen's chastity in Cymbeline was taken by Shakespeare from an English translation of a 15th-century German tale, "Frederyke of Jennen", whose basic plot came from tale II, 9.
- Lope de Vega adapted at least twelve stories from the Decameron for the theatre, including:
  - El ejemplo de casadas y prueba de la paciencia, based on tale X, 10, which was by far the most popular story of the Decameron during the 15th, 16th, and 17th centuries
  - Discreta enamorada, based on tale III, 3
  - El ruiseñor de Sevilla (They're Not All Nightingales), based on parts of V, 4
- Molière's 1661 play L'école des maris is based on tale III, 3.
- Molière borrowed from tale VII, 4 in his play George Dandin ou le Mari confondu (The Confounded Husband). In both stories the husband is convinced that he has accidentally caused his wife's suicide.
- Thomas Middleton's play The Widow is based on tales II, 2 and III, 3.
- The ring parable from tale I, 3 is at the heart of Gotthold Ephraim Lessing's 1779 play Nathan the Wise.
- Alfred, Lord Tennyson, used tale V, 9 for his 1879 play The Falcon.

=== Prose works ===
- Martin Luther retells tale I, 2, in which a Jew converts to Catholicism after visiting Rome and seeing the corruption of the Catholic hierarchy. However, in Luther's version (found in his "Table-talk #1899"), Luther and Philipp Melanchthon try to dissuade the Jew from visiting Rome.
- The story of Griselda (X, 10) was also the basis for the 1694 verse novel Griseldis by Charles Perrault, later included in his 1697 collection Histoires ou contes du temps passé.
- Jonathan Swift used tale I, 3 for his first major published work, A Tale of a Tub (1704).

=== Poetry ===
- The tale of patient Griselda (X, 10) was translated into Latin by Petrarch.
- Geoffrey Chaucer's "The Clerk's Tale" retells the story of Griselda (X, 10), crediting the story to "Fraunceys Petrak, the lauriat poete." While this proves that Chaucer knew of Petrarch's Latin version, it is unclear whether Chaucer had himself read Boccaccio's Italian, Petrarch's Latin, or a later translation of Petrarch (such as any of several French translations available in Chaucer's day).
- John Keats borrowed the tale of Lisabetta and her pot of basil (IV, 5) for his poem, Isabella, or the Pot of Basil.
- At his death Percy Bysshe Shelley had left a fragment of a poem entitled "Ginevra", which he took from the first volume of an Italian book called L'Osservatore Fiorentino. The plot of that book was in turn taken from tale X, 4.
- Henry Wadsworth Longfellow adapted tale V, 9 for the poem "The Falcon of Ser Federigo", included in his 1863 collection Tales of a Wayside Inn.

=== Songs ===
- Tale IV, 1 was the basis for Child ballad 269, "Lady Diamond".

=== Opera ===
- The Venetian writer Apostolo Zeno wrote a libretto named Griselda in 1701, based in part on tale X, 10, and in part on Lope de Vega's theatrical adaptation of it, El ejemplo de casadas y prueba de la paciencia. Various composers wrote music for the libretto, including Carlo Francesco Pollarolo (Griselda, 1701), Tomaso Albinoni (Griselda, 1703), Antonio Maria Bononcini (Griselda, 1718), Alessandro Scarlatti (Griselda, 1721), Giovanni Bononcini (Griselda, 1722) and Antonio Vivaldi (Griselda, 1735).
- Giuseppe Petrosinelli in his libretto for Domenico Cimarosa's comic opera The Italian Girl in London uses the story of the heliotrope (bloodstone) in tale VIII, 3.

=== Film and television ===
- Decameron Nights (1924) was based on three of the tales.
- Decameron Nights (1953) was based on three of the tales and starred Louis Jourdan as Boccaccio.
- Archanděl Gabriel a paní Husa (1965, transl. Archangel Gabriel and Madam Goose) is a puppet film by Jiří Trnka based on story IV, 2.
- The Decameron (1971) by Pier Paolo Pasolini is an anthology film including nine of the stories.
- Virgin Territory (2007) is a romantic comedy film based on The Decameron framing story.
- Wondrous Boccaccio (2015) is loosely based on four of the tales.
- The Little Hours (2017) adapts tales III, 1 and III, 2.
- The Decameron (2024) is a Netflix miniseries inspired by the setting and characters, with nods to the stories.

=== Audio ===
- An unabridged audio recording of the Guido Waldman translation performed by eleven British actors was released by Naxos AudioBooks in 1999.

=== Wrongly considered to be adaptations ===
- Chaucer's "The Franklin's Tale" shares its plot with tale X, 5, although this is not due to a direct borrowing from Boccaccio. Rather, both authors used a common French source.
- The motif of the three trunks in The Merchant of Venice by Shakespeare is found in tale X, 1. However, both Shakespeare and Boccaccio probably came upon the tale in Gesta Romanorum.

== Collections emulating the Decameron ==
- Marguerite de Navarre's Heptaméron is heavily based on the Decameron.
- Christoph Martin Wieland's set of six novellas, Das Hexameron von Rosenhain, is based on the structure of the Decameron.
- In 2020 State Theatre Company of South Australia and ActNow Theatre created a project called Decameron 2.0 in response to the COVID-19 crisis, which involved 10 writers creating 10 stories each over 10 weeks, loosely connected to themes in the Decameron.
- Also in response to the COVID-19 pandemic, the July 12, 2020, issue of The New York Times Magazine featured a short story collection entitled The Decameron Project, with new writings from contemporary authors including Margaret Atwood, and illustrations by Sophy Hollington and other artists.
- Published in 2021, The San Diego Decameron Project Anthology features 100 stories from 100 San Diegan authors based loosely around the theme of the COVID-19 pandemic, in tribute to the Decameron. The collection is presented by Write Out Loud, San Diego Public Library, La Jolla Historical Society, and San Diego Writers Ink.

== Boccaccio's drawings ==
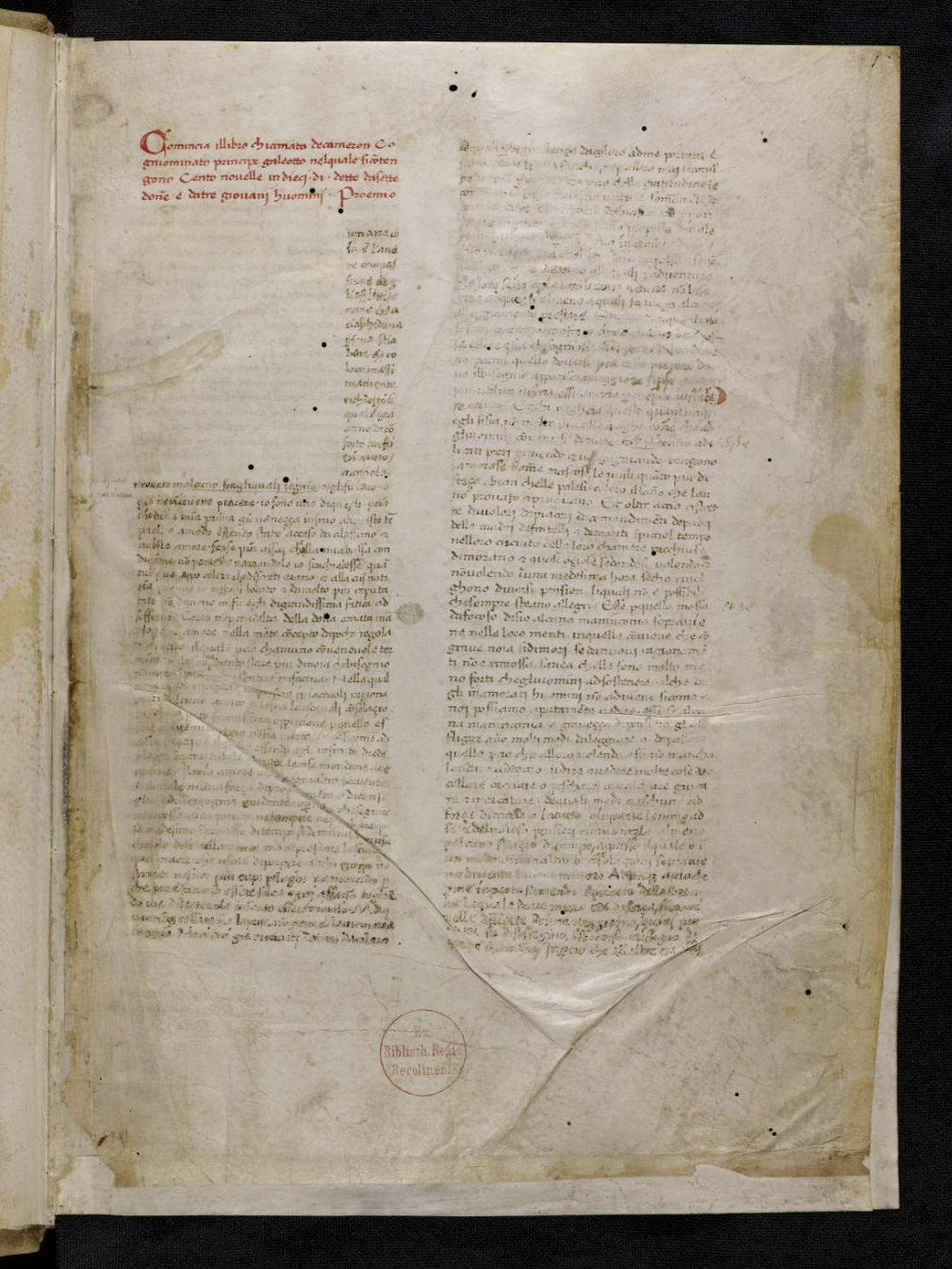
Autograph of the Decameron by Giovanni Boccaccio, manuscript Hamilton 90 at Berlin State Library, with Boccaccio's drawing

Because the Decameron was very popular among contemporaries, especially merchants, many manuscripts of it survive. A comprehensive survey of extant manuscripts by Italian philologist Vittore Branca identified a few copied under Boccaccio's supervision; some have notes written in Boccaccio's hand. Two in particular have elaborate drawings, probably done by Boccaccio himself. Since these manuscripts were widely circulated, Branca thought that they influenced all subsequent illustrations. In 1962 Branca identified Codex Hamilton 90, in Berlin's Staatsbibliothek, as an autograph belonging to Boccaccio's latter years.

== See also ==
- Cent Nouvelles Nouvelles
- One Thousand and One Nights
- The Masque of the Red Death
- The Plague (novel)
- Summary of Decameron novellas
