= Stefano Benedetto Pallavicino =

Italian poet and opera librettist (1672–1742)

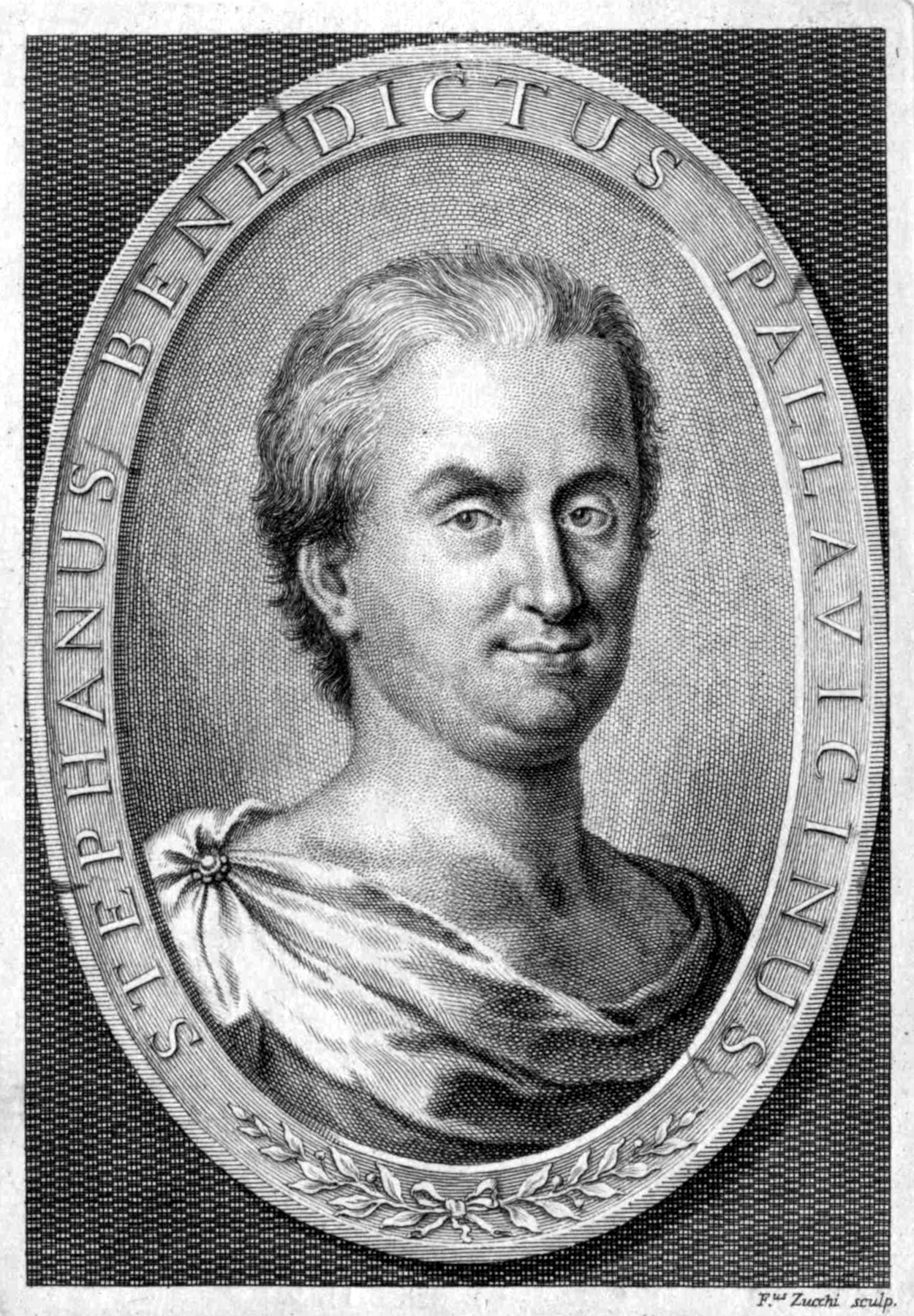
Stefano Benedetto Pallavicino

Stefano Benedetto Pallavicino (21 March 1672 – 16 April 1742) was an Italian poet and opera librettist. He was the son of the composer Carlo Pallavicino (1630?-1688). (Their surname Pallavicino is sometimes spelt Pallavicini.)

== Biography ==
Pallavicino was born in Padua. He worked at the courts of Dresden and Düsseldorf as a poet, secretary and librettist, and produced almost twenty opera librettos during his lengthy career. His opera librettos were set by the composers Agostino Steffani, Antonio Lotti, Giovanni Alberto Ristori and the German master of Italian opera seria, Johann Adolf Hasse among others.

His first libretto was, Antiope (1689). He also wrote the text for the comic opera Calandro by Giovanni Alberto Ristori, which was first staged in 1726 at the castle of Pilnitz near Dresden, and then in Moscow in 1731 when it was the first opera ever performed in Russia. He later composed the libretto for the five-act opera seria Alfonso (1738) by Johann Adolf Hasse.

He was also known for his translations of Horace's Odes, Epistles and Satires. He died in Dresden, aged 70.

== See also ==
- Russian opera
- Giovanni Alberto Ristori
- Calandro
- Bernardo Dovizi

== Sources ==
- Warrack, John and West, Ewan (1992), The Oxford Dictionary of Opera, 782 pages, ISBN 0-19-869164-5
