= Giovanni Alberto Ristori =

Italian opera composer and conductor (1692–1753)

Giovanni Alberto Ristori (1692 – 7 February 1753) was an Italian opera composer and conductor.

Born in Bologna (the son of another musician, Tommaso Ristori), he joined an opera troupe, led by his father, in Dresden. This troupe was responsible to August II the Strong, who was both King of Poland and Elector of Saxony. August II lent his opera troupe to the Russian Empress Anna for her coronation (1731). The younger Ristori remained in Dresden for two decades after August's demise, and he himself died there.

Calandro, his opera in three acts to a libretto by Stefano Benedetto Pallavicino, was the work which Empress Anna heard at her coronation. It is both the first opera buffa written in Germany and also the first Italian opera performed on Russian soil. Both the elder and the younger Ristori directed the staging, which involved thirteen actors and nine singers including Ludovica Seyfried, Margherita Ermini and Rosalia Fantasia.

In 1916 the German musicologist Curt Rudolf Mengelberg published the first study on Ristori and his music: Curt Rudolf Mengelberg, Giovanni Alberto Ristori: ein Beitrag zur Geschichte italienischer Kunstherrschaft in Deutschland im 18. Jahrhundert (Leipzig: Breitkopf & Härtel, 1916). Although short on biographical details, it is a landmark publication because Mengelberg had access to many Dresden music sources which have been missing since late in World War II. This applies especially to Ristori’s sacred music; prior to 1945 Ristori’s sacred music was held both in score and parts by the Dresden State Library (today, Dresden State and University Library (SLUB)).

Despite the losses of Dresden material, copies of Ristori's sacred music have been found in Czech and Polish music libraries. The Icelandic independent musicologist Jóhannes Ágústsson wrote a study entitled "Giovanni Alberto Ristori at the Court of Naples 1738-1740" (Studi pergolesiani – Pergolesi studies 8, eds C. Bacciagaluppi, H.-G. Ottenberg and L. Zoppelli, Bern, Peter Lang, 2012, pp. 53–100). Ágústsson's study introduced many new biographical details about the Italian composer, including previously unknown information about Ristori’s role as the royal music teacher of the princess Maria Amalia of Saxony, later Queen of the Two Sicilies and Queen of Spain.

Recordings of some of Ristori’s works have been released on CD.

== Works, editions, and selected recordings ==
Discography

- Cantatas for Soprano and Oboe concerto. María Savastano (soprano), Jon Olaberria (oboe), Ensemble Diderot, Johannes Pramsohler (Audax Records 2017)
- Missa - on Weihnachten am Dresdner Hof Kopp (Carus)
- Calandro - Batzdorfer Hofkapelle (KammerTon, 2005)
- Divoti Affetti alla Passione di Nostro Signore. Echo du Danube (Accent, 2011)
- Canto Divoti Affetti on La Voce Virtuosa: Lute and the Saxon Vocal Tradition PGM 106 Includes the world-premiere recording of Ristori's "Canto Divoti Affetti" which was presumed until early 1995 to have been destroyed during the World War II bombings of Dresden.
