= Toys and games in ancient Rome =

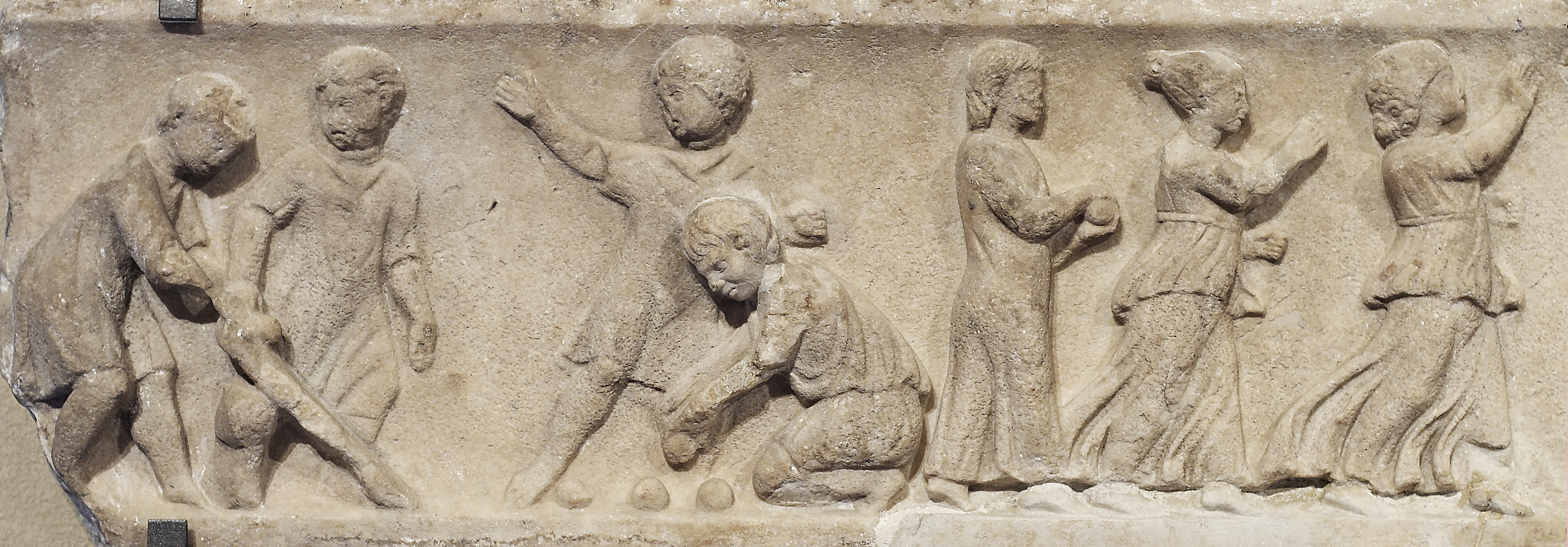
Marble relief (2nd century AD) of Roman children playing ball games: the girl at the far right is tossing a ball in the air (Louvre)

The ancient Romans had a variety of toys and games. Children used toys such as tops, marbles, wooden swords, kites, whips, seesaws, dolls, chariots, and swings. Gambling and betting were popular games in ancient Rome. Legislation heavily regulated gambling; however, these laws were likely not enforced. Tali, Terni lapilli, Duodecim Scripta, and Ludus latrunculorum were all popular games in ancient Rome. They were similar to poker, tic-tac-toe, backgammon, and chess respectively. Nine men's morris may also have been a popular game in ancient Rome. Roman children also played games simulating historical battles and could pretend to be important government officials.

== Gambling and betting ==
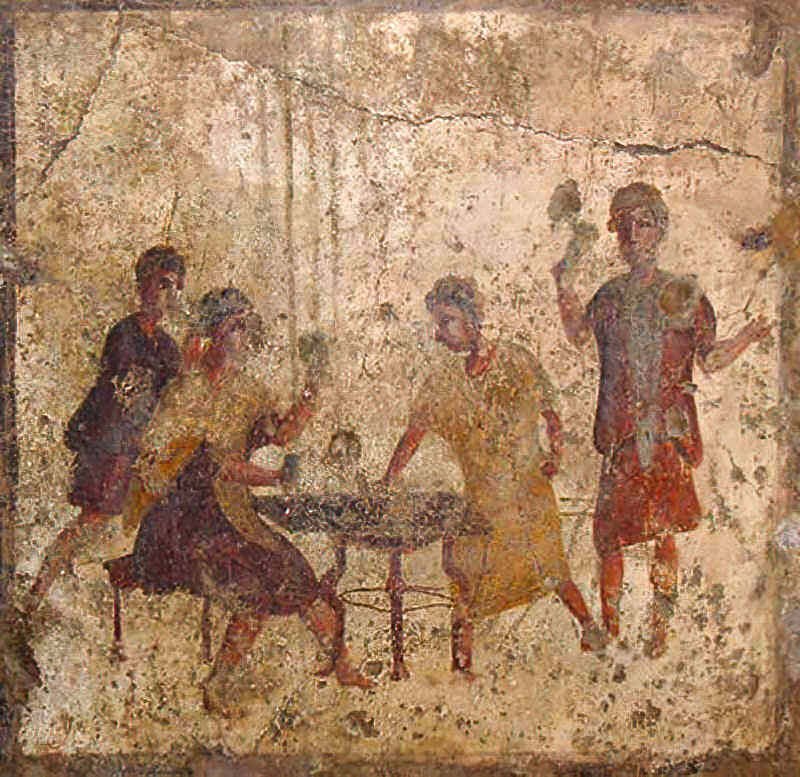
Fresco depicting ancient Roman dice players

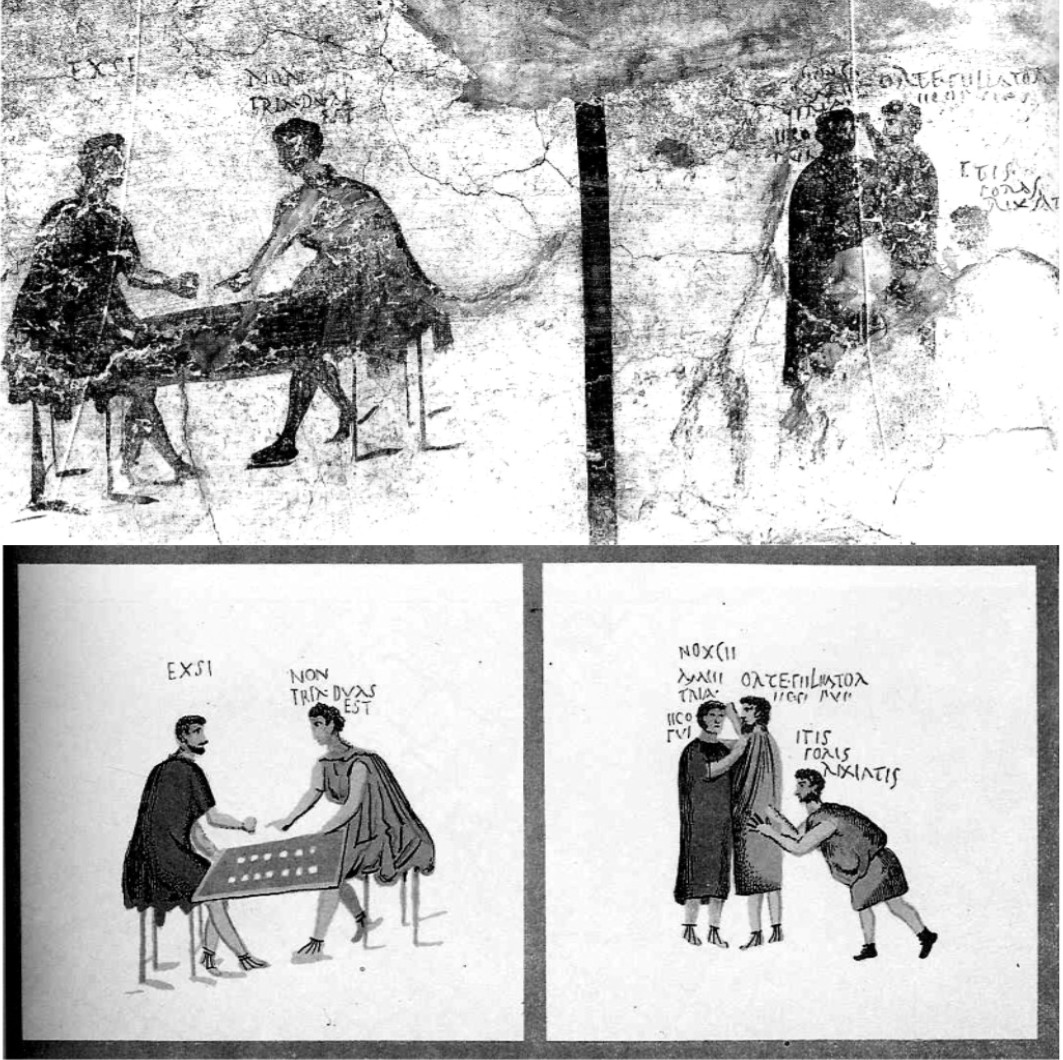
Pompeian fresco depicting a bar fight over gambling

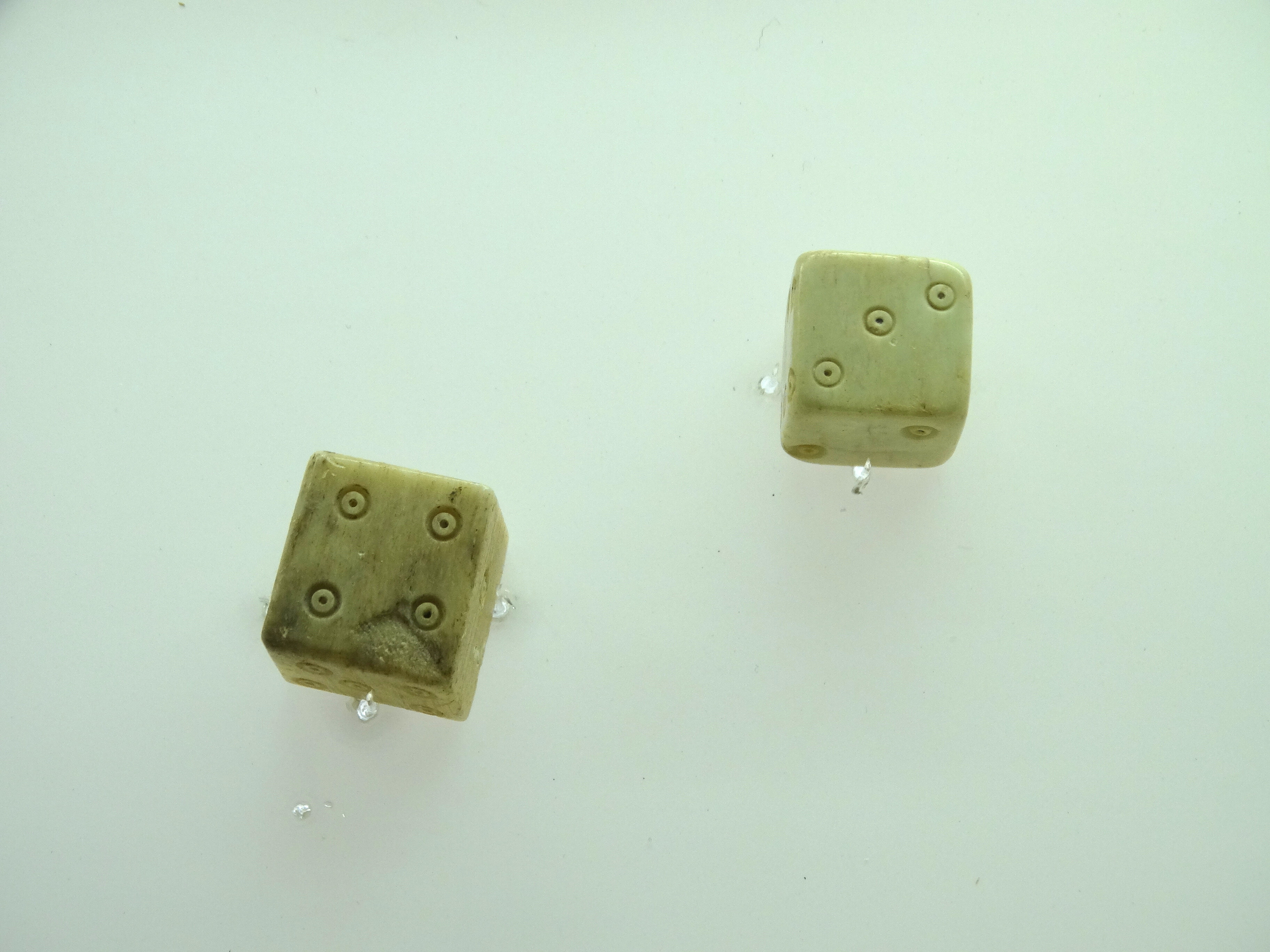
1st-2nd century Roman dice from Cartagena, Spain.

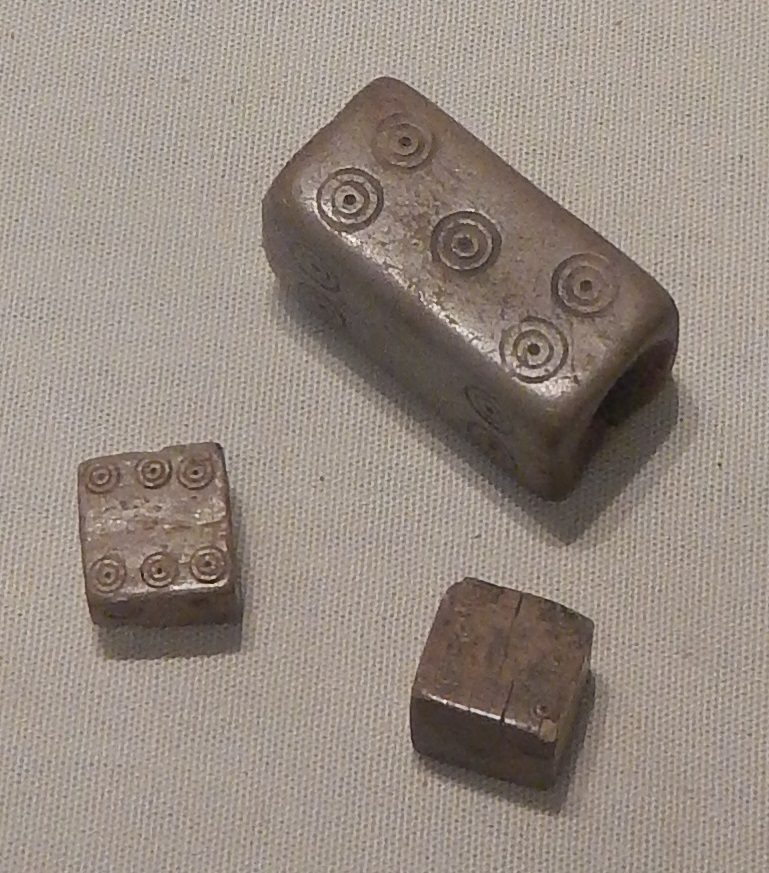
Ancient Roman bone dice found near Silchester

Gambling and betting were popular games in ancient Rome. Roman gaming tables frequently appear in the archaeological record; they are often unearthed in private buildings, public spaces, and urban areas. Finds of gambling-related materials are rarer in residential spaces than in public spaces. Possibly because gambling was a communal activity, therefore occurring primarily in social areas. Gambling tables are especially common near military sites. Inscriptions found on military gaming tables often reference foul play or violence: One inscription reads, "Get up! You know nothing about the game; make room for better players!" Two paintings discovered in Pompeii depict a brawl emerging between two players over a disagreement about the game; the brawl is interrupted by the innkeeper, who demands they exit the shop. Popinae, ancient Roman wine bars, provided attendees with gambling services. Due to their connotations of prostitution and gambling, the Romans viewed popinae as centers of violence and crime. Those who managed private institutions that offered gambling services were euphemistically known as susceptores, meaning "entrepreneurs." Gambling without a gaming board, exclusively using dice, was also common in ancient Rome.

Although gambling was certainly extremely popular in ancient Rome, it was viewed as sinful and corrupt. According to the 4th-century Roman historian Ammianus Marcellinus, most members of the upper classes did not wish to identify themselves as gamblers, instead preferring the term tesserarii, meaning "dicer." Aleator, the Latin term for a hobbyist gambler, was viewed in at least a somewhat derogatory sense. He described a gambling mania that was ubiquitous across all Roman social classes. Marcellinus argued that the decline of Rome itself was attributable to the pervasiveness of gambling; he claimed that gambling obsession prevented "anything memorable or serious from being done in Rome." Similarly, the 1st-century BCE poet Horace complained that "To nobler sentiment and manlier deed: Now the noble's first-born shuns the perilous chase, nor learns to sit his steed: Set him to the unlawful dice, or Grecian hoop, how skillfully he plays." Juvenal, a 2nd-century satirist, criticized gambling as a waste of money better allocated towards the public good: "Is it a simple form of madness to lose a hundred thousand sesterces, and not have a shirt to give to a shivering slave?" De Aleatoribus, an early Christian text falsely attributed to St Cyprian, condemning gambling and dice-games as impure and immoral.

Paranoia over young men losing their money through gambling was widespread in ancient Rome, and likely motivated the legislation against the pastime. Gambling was associated with the lower social classes; gamblers were viewed similarly to petty criminals. Connotations of low social status prompted the Roman fear that, through gambling, an individual could become indebted to another of lower social status. Roman youth were expected to dedicate their leisure time to activities of self-betterment. Such concepts may have influenced the Roman legislation on gambling, including the exemption of elderly persons from these laws. Numerous Roman emperors, such as Augustus and Claudius were enthusiasts in gambling. Claudius wrote a now-lost book about playing dice. This book is speculated to have been titled De arte aleae, which translates to On the Art of Dice. Augustus is recorded to have offered sums of money to his guests to ensure they continued betting and gambling. Emperors such as Caligula, Nero, or Commodus were all depicted as either enthusiastic gamblers or full-on gambling addicts by ancient biographers. However, these descriptions were possibly part of a smear campaign to discredit these unpopular emperors.

The earliest known ancient Roman gambling law is the lex Talaria, or the lex Alearia. The law most likely outlawed gambling and dicing. Although gambling was heavily regulated, these laws were lifted during the holiday of Saturnalia. There is in any case little evidence that regulations against gambling were well-enforced. Sports betting was exempt from Roman gambling laws, and it remained decriminalized even after the rise of Christianity. Sports gambling may have been viewed more favorably due to the lack of any large-scale industry centered around sports betting, the tendency for sports bets to occur between friends, and because such bets likely carried smaller stakes than other forms of gambling. Julius Paulus, a 2nd-3rd century Roman jurist, records three laws passed by Sulla regarding gambling: the lex Cornelia, the lex Titia, and the lex Publicia. According to Paulus, these laws exempted betting on "contests of manhood," specifically javelin-throwing, wrestling, running, jumping, and ancient Olympic sports, from the prohibition on gambling. The criminalization of gambling prevented, in some circumstances, the collection of gambling debts. Under Roman law, a Pater familias could demand the repayment of money any member of their household lost through gambling. The losers of the bets could demand the restoration of their wealth from the Pater familias of the winner's family. Slave owners operated according to identical principles regarding their slaves and gambling. Roman gambling laws may have primarily existed for symbolic reasons rather than any practical benefit derived from such legislation. These laws may have been used to portray their proponents as righteous citizens and the protectors of the "mos maiorum,” the customs and traditions of Ancient Rome.

=== Dice ===
The majority of ancient Roman dice were visibly asymmetrical. However, this asymmetry may not necessarily stem from attempts to manipulate the outcome a game; some of the materials commonly used to create Roman dice, such as antlers, would have been difficult to mold into a symmetrical shape. The Romans possibly thought that the results of dice games were determined by fate rather than mathematical probability; henceforth, they may not have viewed the creation of symmetrical, balanced dice as important.

Romano-British dice are overwhelmingly six-sided and of cubic shape. However, this rule was not universal; a sample from Castleford consists almost entirely of irregular pieces of non-cubic dice. Composite dice were typically larger than standard Roman dice; they were capable of reaching up to 26 millimeters in size. During the earlier parts of the Roman occupation of Britain, the island was home to a unique variety of dice: the composite die. This type of die was often made from bone, usually cattle metapodia although the bones of other animals, such as horses, were also used. Cattle metapodia lack much meat, making them undesirable to butchers; they are also large and durable, with a narrow shaft making them suited for dice-creation. It is likely that composite dice were made by detaching the endings, or epiphysis, of the bones before removing the marrow stored inside the medullary cavity. Roman craftsmen may have used the remaining shaft of bone to create either a single die or multiple; the exact process is unclear. The metapodial bones initially contained holes which, during the creation process, were filled by another substance to form a semi-solid cube. In the final stage of composite dice creation, the pips might have been inlaid with black materials and the whole die may have been polished with wax.

Smaller dice were made by an elongated rod used to plane, or smooth, the cortical bone of a diaphysis. Then, a deep groove was used to saw off different segments of the bone, partially separating them into dice. They were possibly not completely separated at this stage; instead, they may have been loosely connected to each other through a remaining strip of bone. The dice may have only been separated after they had been marked with pips. Although, it is possible that the pip style was marked after separation and the dice were initially divided using the groove. Another sample of pre-650 CE dice from sites throughout the modern Netherlands, were made from various organic materials such as bone, ivory, or antlers. These dice display similar variation in their pip style, or the arrangement of dots on the dice: 50% have a dot surrounded by one concentric circle, 25% have a dot surrounded by two concentric circles, and another 25% have a central, usually circular, hole. Although the Netherlands was never conquered by the Romans, these dice were likely influenced by the Romans and resemble dice found in the Roman regions of Britain. Samples of 1st to 7th century dice unearthed around the Lower Danube display largely similar ornamentation; however, they bear slightly different characteristics depending upon their manufacturer.

=== Dice towers ===
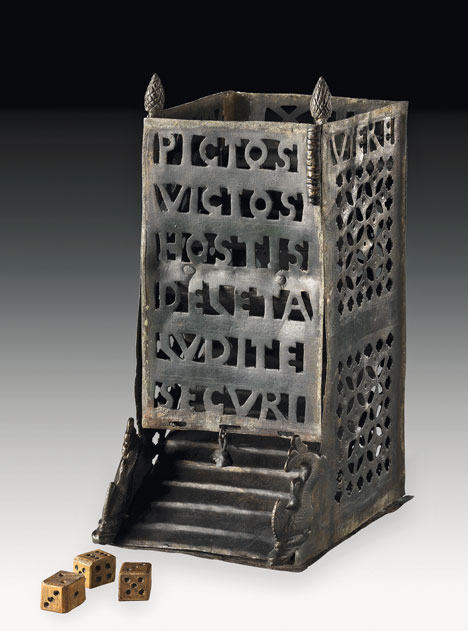
Ancient Roman 4th century CE dice tower

Dice were sometimes stored in fritillus, a dice box shaped like a wooden tower containing a spiral. Fritilli were used to prevent cheating by rolling dice without player intervention. The term "fritillus" has been theorized to refer to a dice tower based on its appearances in the works of Seneca, Juvenal, and Martial. The fritilli may have been synonymous with an ancient type of small pear or oval-shaped pots, particularly various deposits discovered in Pompeii. One example of such pottery from a Pompeian household is 7–15 cm high with a wide mouth and an oval body; its base consists of a small, flattened knob allowing it to stand more stably on its mouth rather than its base. This base has been identified as possibly a fritillus due to its initial location, which was nearby a set of dice. Another example of a similar piece of pottery has a smaller mouth, a more cylindrical shape, and a base consisting of a low foot. Although this example may also represent a fritillus, its initial location lacks the same proximity towards nearby dice. It is also possible that neither piece of pottery represents a fritillus; neither piece has been directly identified with gaming pieces and similar pottery from the Casa del Quadretti teatrali contains traces of paint, possibly suggesting that it was not merely a dice-thrower. The archeological finds of pots suggest that, if these pots were fritilli, the exact methods by which a fritillus was used varied depending on the structure. In some pots, the mouth is large enough to allow dice to be inserted easily. Other pots had significantly smaller mouths, ensuring only small dice could be inserted. It is also possible that the dice were placed on the funnel and then thrown. Fritilli disappeared from the archaeological record by the 4th century; by the 5th century, scholars were limited to hypothesizing about the characteristics of a fritillus.

The term fritillus was not the only word used to describe dice towers in ancient Rome; the terms turricula and pyrgus also appear in Roman literature. Pyrgus later appears in Medieval writings in reference to the king-piece in the game of tæfl. According to the 6th-century BCE Christian scholar Isidore of Seville, in his work Etymologiae, the word pyrgus descends from the Greek word for tower. It also appears in the 4th or 5th century CE text Anthologia Latina to describe a dice tower. Another word for a dice tower, turricula, appears in the Epigrams of Martial.

Excavations in Richborough revealed dice towers made from bone plating nailed using bone pins to a wooden structure. Three of the plates are decorated with concentric circles or large circles containing either hexafoils or six-leaved rosettes. Another plate is ornamented with concentric circles surrounded by smaller circles and dots with a horizontal line stretching across the top edge. These geometric embellishments are common to other Roman objects, such as boxes, found in the 4th century CE. Rosettes specifically have been identified on gaming boards, including a 2nd century CE board from Denbighshire. Other examples of Roman dice towers suggest that they could have been made from wood or bronze; then, in some cases, inlaid with ivory and fitted with silver pieces. Bone and antler were also used as inlay materials in some dice towers discovered in Britain. The Vettweiß-Froitzheim Dice Tower is inscribed with two messages: "Pictos Victos Hostis Deleta Ludite Securi" and "Uteri Felix Vivas," meaning "The Picts are conquered, the enemy destroyed—play in safety" and "Use happily; you may live" respectively.

=== Nut-related gambling ===
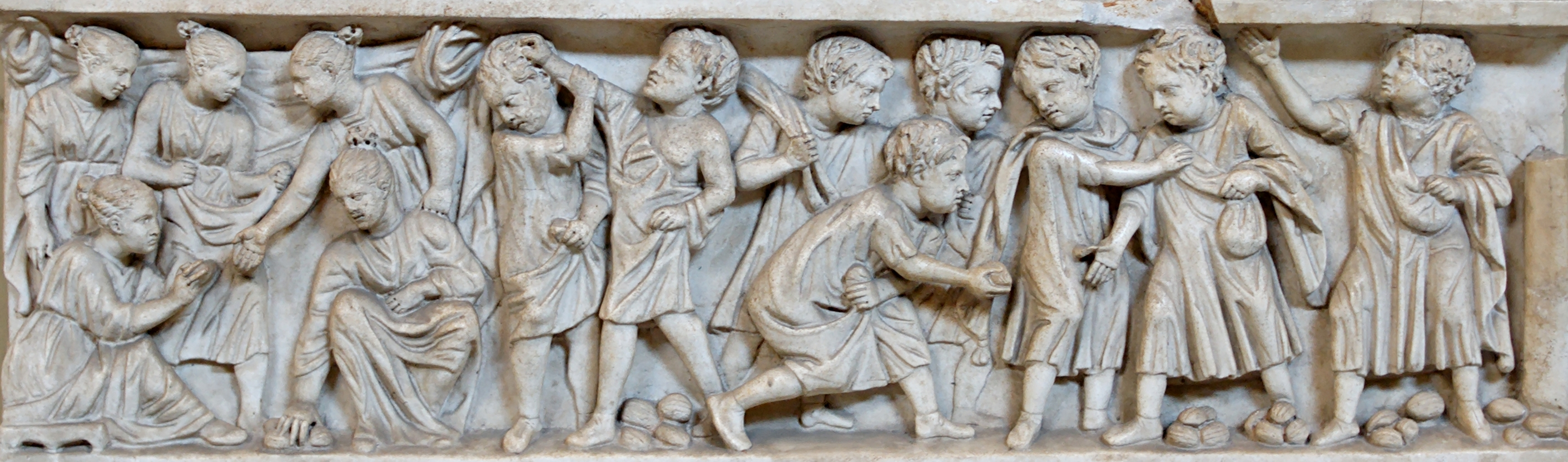
Sarcophagus depicting Roman children playing games using nuts

For Roman children, another common variety of gambling in Ancient Rome involved the usage of nuts. The Latin phrase Nuces relinquere, “to leave the walnuts behind,” metaphorically referred to abandoning childhood and entering maturity. Imagery on Roman child sarcophagi depict children playing with toy nuts. Depictions from a mid-3rd century sarcophagus in Ostia portray groups of young boys playing with nuts; two are fighting over a toy nut while another prepares to throw a nut. Another child sarcophagus dated to the late 3rd century depicts groups of young girls and boys engaged in play with toy nuts. The boys are depicted with more active play: they grab, touch and restrain each other; one boy is depicted with his tunic falling off. In contrast, the young girls are portrayed as more organized, less active, more well-kempt, and more sedentary; they are not physically active, unlike the boys.

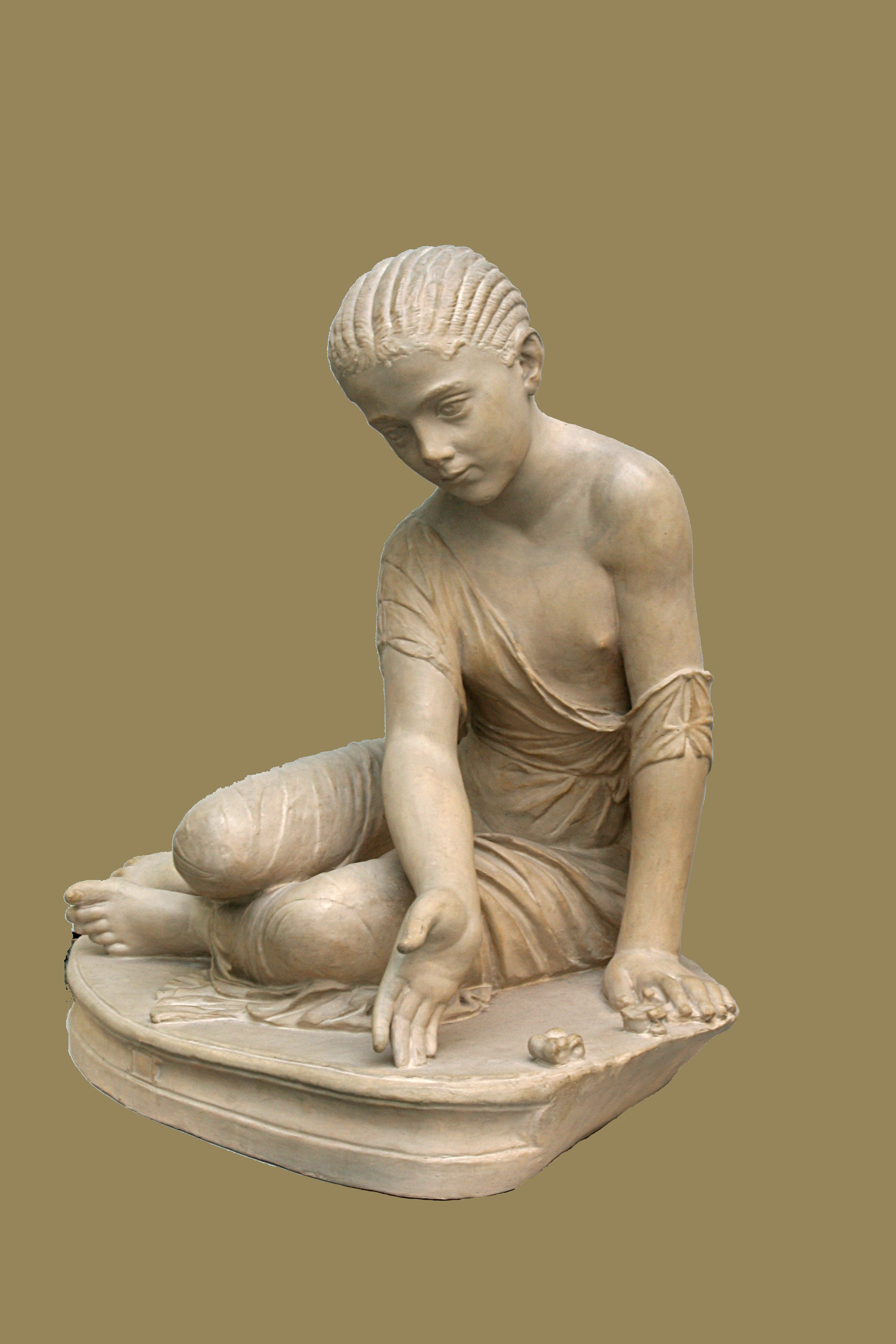
Girl playing knucklebones (130–150 AD, Glyptothek Munich)

Although nuts were common, other materials could serve as missiles: pebbles, shells, coins, or knucklebones were also used. In one grave site in Vetralla, a woman was buried with a nut carved from quartz. Excavations of Roman grave sites have revealed nut-shaped terracotta objects, possibly for usage in games involving nuts. According to the unreliable Historia Augusta, the emperor Gallienus substituted nuts with apples in these games. Nuces Castellatae consisted of building a pyramidal structure with a base of three nuts and a fourth nut placed on top. The players would then attempt to knock down the structure with another nut. The French scholar Becq de Fouquières argued that in this game, the first shot was taken kneeling followed by at most two successive shots taken whilst standing. Descriptions from the Pseudo-Ovidian poem Nux indicate that Roman children played a game in which players aimed to roll nuts off a wooden board and crash them into other nuts lying on the floor. Various other versions of nut-games existed in Ancient Rome. The Romans called one variation of this game orca, meaning "vase," as the nuts were tossed into a narrow jar. Lucius Verus is credited with inventing a variation of this game where the player was required to destroy the vase with a copper coin thrown from a distance. In another Roman nut game, players divided a triangle into several subsections using chalk. The players would try and throw the nut into the differing compartments, with winnings distributed according to the section the nut landed in.

== Tali ==
Tali, also known as astragali or knucklebones was an ancient Roman dice game similar to poker. It used two kinds of dice. One kind was a large die with only four marks. It only had the numbers 1, 2, 3, and 6. Each player had four dice, and would throw them as part of the game. If all dice had landed on a different number, it was called a Venus or Royal. If all the dice had landed on the number one, then it was known as the dogs or four vultures. If the player threw a dogs then they would put materials in the pot. If they threw a Venus then they would claim all of the wagered material. In another version of this game, players would throw knucklebones into the air and attempt to catch them as they fell. The winner was the player who caught the most. Tropa is another possible variation of astragali mentioned most commonly in Greek sources. Julius Pollux, a 2nd-century Greek grammarian, describes it as a game in which acorns are thrown into the air. In other Greek sources the game is instead described as involving astragals being thrown into a hole. The game is also mentioned by the 1st-century Roman poet Martial: "the doubtful dice boxes clatter and tropa plays with yet naughtier knucklebones."

== Twelve Lines ==
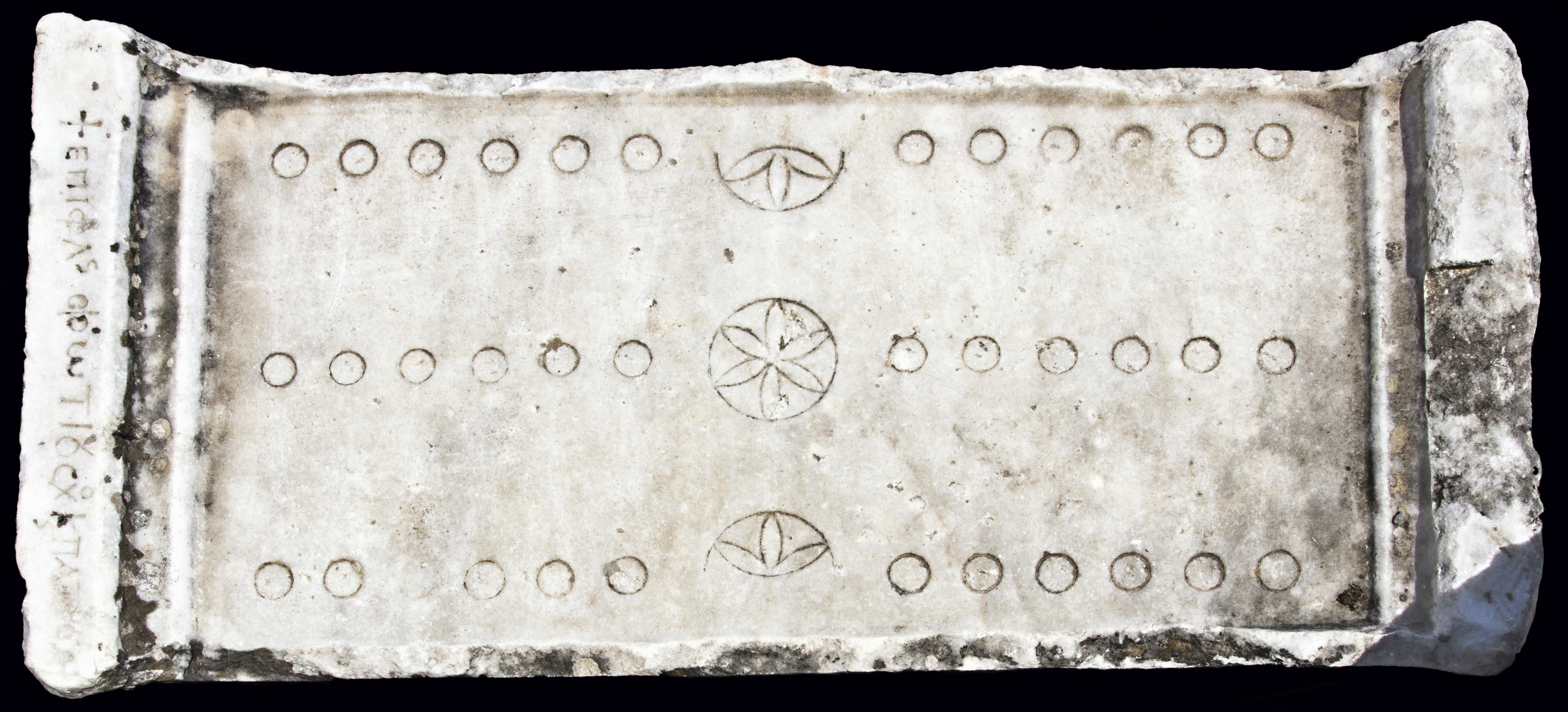
Duodecim Scripta board

One popular dice game was known as Ludus Duodecim Scriptorum or Duodecim Scripta, meaning Twelve Lines, Twelve Signs, Twelve Points, or Twelve Writings. Rounded bone pieces were used to play this game. They could be a variety of colors: blue, black, green, or red. Each player had 15 pieces and placed them on a playing table divided into three horizontal lines with 12 spaces. Some boards used squares, letters, lines, circles, monograms, crescents, or crosses instead of boxes. It was also common for boxes to contain six-letter words. Collectively, a Duodecim Scripta board could contain 36-letter hexagrams detailing the circumstances surrounding the game. The playing tables, known as the alveolus, were typically made from limestone or marble. Although, leather and wood were also used. Wooden boards were likely common in ancient Rome. However, few have persisted in the archaeological record. Although the exact rules of the game are unclear, it likely resembled backgammon. The movement of pieces was likely determined by the rolling of the dice. Each piece may have started on the left side of the board, then shifted to the right, and proceeded to move counterclockwise. The players aimed to move all of their pieces around the board.

== Others ==
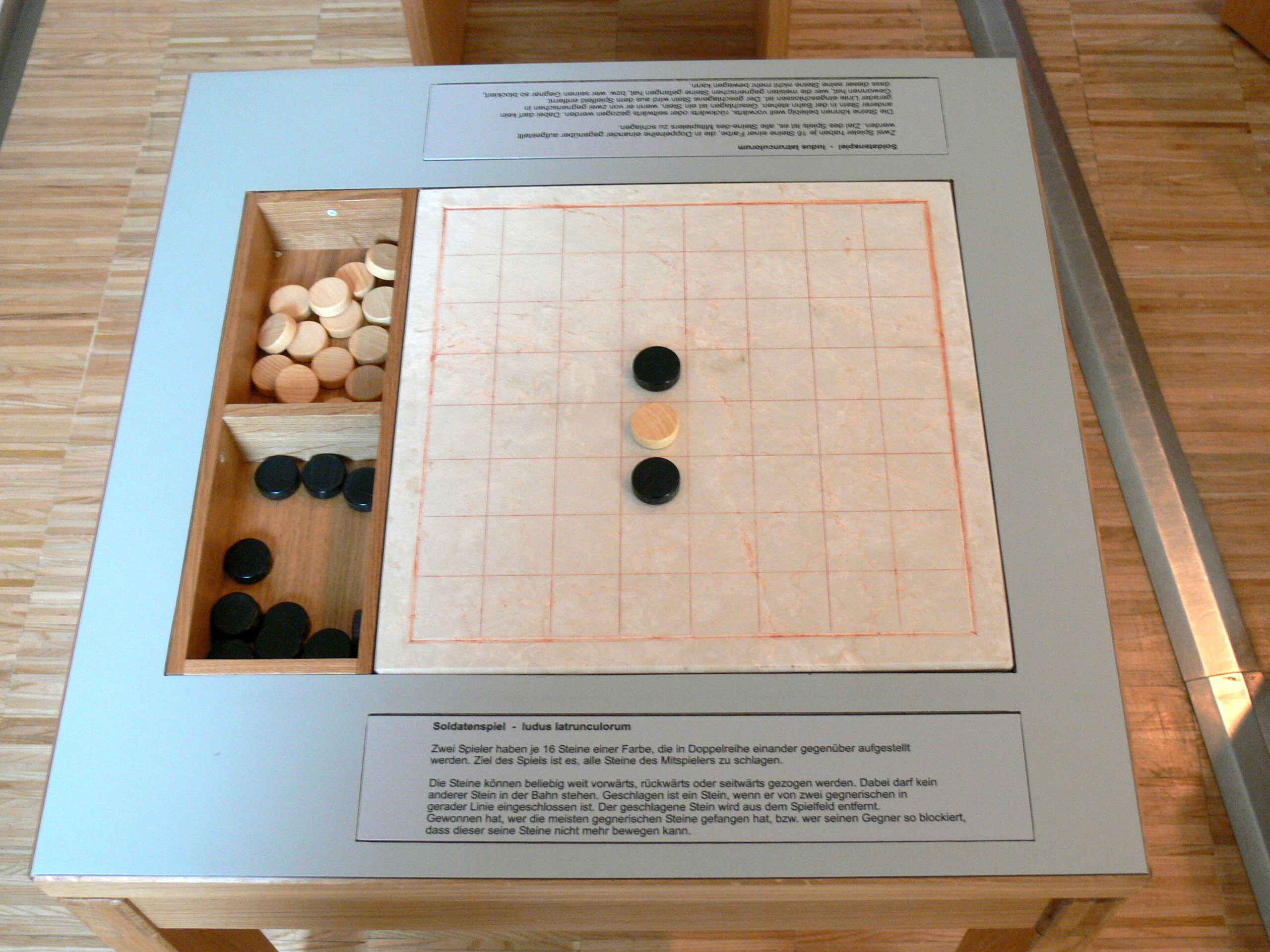
Modern reconstruction of Ludus Latrunculorum

Ludus latrunculorum, meaning "Game of Robbers," was another Roman board game. In this game each counter had a different value; the goal was to capture the opponent's pieces. This game was especially popular with soldiers. Nine men's morris was played in ancient Rome and was probably well-known. It may have been imported to the Roman world through trade routes from Sri Lanka to Egypt and ultimately Rome. Circular or square patterns divided into 8 subsections have been found carved into surfaces throughout the Roman world. These games were initially identified as a type of Roman game similar to Three men's morris or tic-tac-toe. This assumption partially derives from a description from Ovid, which some historians believed to have referenced a game similar to a Morris game:

There is another game divided into as many parts as there are months in the year. A table has three pieces on either side; the winner must get all the pieces in a straight line. It is a bad thing for a woman not to know how to play, for love often comes into being during play.

However, this interpretation has been criticized as the game may not have been compatible with the rules of Three Men's Morris and Ovid provides scant detail on the structure of the board itself; the actual board described in the passage does not necessarily resemble the circular boards identified in archaeological sites. The presence of these boards at the temple of Apollo in Didyma led the scholar Olaf Höckmann to believe that they may have served an apotropaic function.

Seneca the Younger describes young children pretending to be senators or other magistrates. Children were said to have played games simulating the Battle of Actium. The children used a nearby pond to simulate the Adriatic Sea, and they took different sides and fought in the streets. Macrobius describes another ancient Roman children’s game called capita aut navim, in which the players tossed a coin in the air and predicted the side it would land on. The coin used in this game depicted the head of Janus on one side and a ship on the other side. According to Macrobius, this type of coin was designed by Janus, who marked the coin with a boat to commemorate the arrival of Saturn to Italy, which had been by boat.

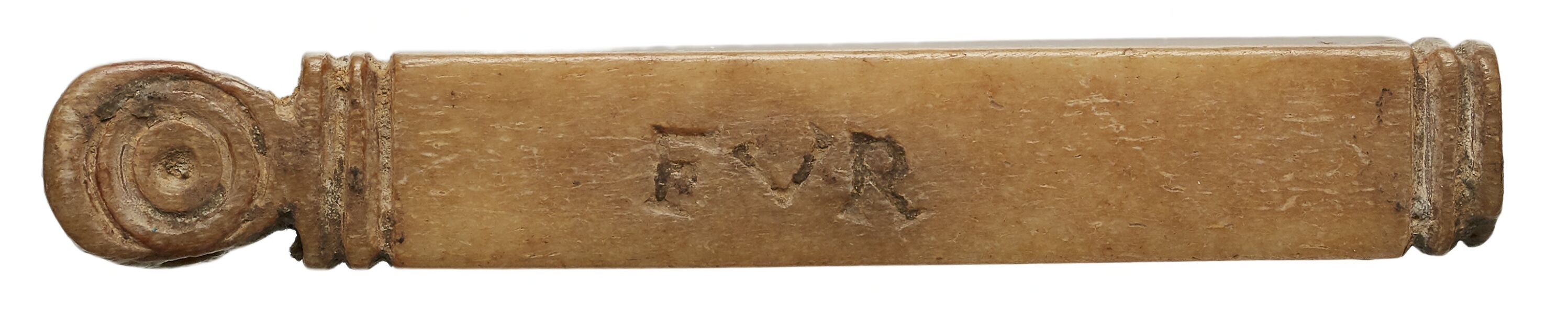
An example of a tesserae lusoriae inscribed with the Latin word fur, meaning "thief."

Other archaeological items, such as tesserae lusoriae, have been interpreted as games, even though their functionality is still unknown.

Roman games influenced the leisure cultures of other civilizations. Archaeological evidence suggests that Roman gaming boards spread throughout the ancient world, reaching as far as Scandinavia. The Roman word tabula, referring to a gaming tablet or board, likely is the ancestor of Germanic or Celtic words such as *tabulā or tafl. Scandinavian societies adopted ludus latrunculorum into their societies, creating the variant hnefatafl. The "Druid of Colchester," an ancient grave dated to the 40s-50s BC in Stanway, England, contains the remains of a board game. Although it is possibly an example of Duodecim Scripta, it may also represent an otherwise unknown Roman or Celtic board game. The gravesite in Colchester is not alone amongst Romano-British artifacts; other excavations in Britain have revealed board games implying that Roman games spread throughout the region concurrent to Romanization. In one grave, a set of 24 glass items divided into four groups was discovered. This possibly was used for an unknown four-player game; however, such a game would have been unique as most ancient Roman board games required two players.

== Toys ==
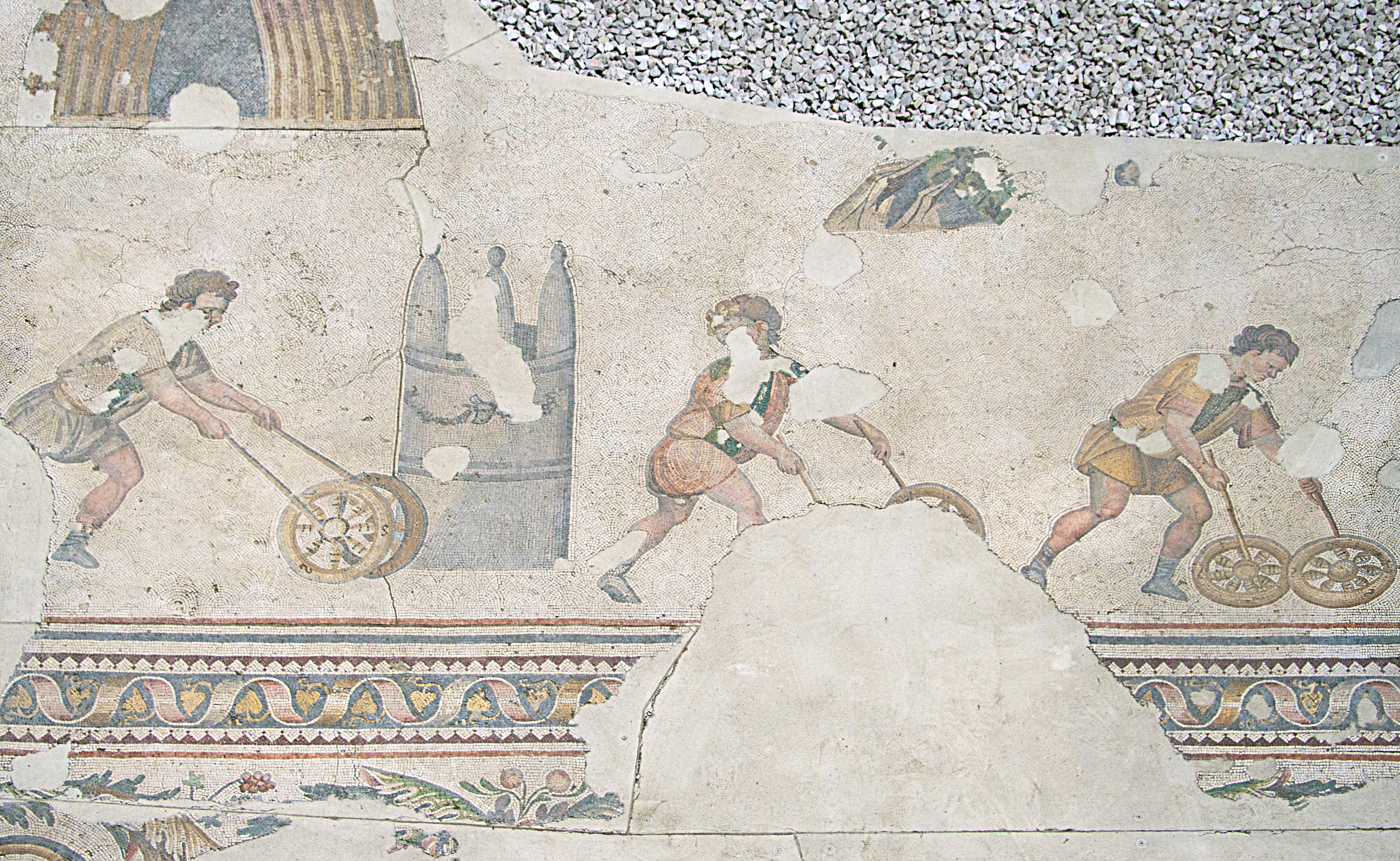
Mosaic from the floor of the Imperial palace in Constantinople

Different age groups had different toys. Babies played with charms, bells, animal-shaped whistles, and large rattles known as crepitacula. They could be made from either wood, bronze, clay, and, in rare occasions, dried heads of poppies. Crepitacula were often shaped like boxes, spheres, rolls, fruits like pomegranates or pumpkins, and animals such as owls, pigs, or hedgehogs. Pebbles were sometimes placed inside these toys to allow the device to make noise. Another type of rattle, called "crepundia," were small toys used to make noises intended to entertain a baby. They were often shaped like axes, swords, animals, tools, flowers, or half-moons. They were typically crafted from clay or bronze. Wealthy families could highlight their prestige through crepundia made from gold or silver pieces tied onto a thread or chain by a string running through piercings. The name of the father or mother of the baby could be inscribed into the crepundia to allow for a lost child to be returned to their families.

Toddlers were given pull toys, pushcarts, and wooden carts to help them learn to walk. Older male children had spinning tops, hoops, and toy horses made from sticks. The toy horses could be accompanied by toy chariots. Roman children would push around toy chariots with wooden sticks or pull them along with strings. Children could have races between toy chariots driven by mice. Roman boys could use larger toy chariots with two or four wheels as riding devices. Artwork from sarcophagi and mosaics depicts these chariots being pulled by goats, peacocks, or dogs. Another similar toy was a mounted figure with a hole in the legs to allow a thread to be strung through. Wheels could be attached to the thread, allowing for the toy to be pushed or pulled around. Other common toys included tops, marbles, wooden wheels, metal hoops, wooden swords, kites, terracotta or plaster figures of animals, whips, seesaws, and swings.

Imagery of toys hoops is present in a 5th century mosaic from the floor of the Imperial Palace in Constantinople. Four children are depicted pushing hoops around with sticks. The children are wearing blue and green tunics; possibly a reflection of the blue and green factions, referred to as "demes." Another Roman 1st century sard gem depicts a child using a curved stick to play with hoops. The unique stick construction was likely intended to allow for special hoop tricks. The poet Propertius described young children attaching metal rings to their hoops, creating a loud noise as the hoop rolled. Martial commentates upon this modification, stating that it the sound warned nearby pedestrians of the rolling hoop. Although used as a toy, Ovid describes it as an artform: "another tells in verse of the various forms of balls and the way they are thrown; this one instructs in the art of swimming, that in the art of the hoop." Horace advises those unskilled in the art to remain reticent about their deficiencies: "if unskilled in ball or quoit or hoop, remains aloof, lest the crowded circle break out in righteous laughter." Depictions of the Erotes found on 3rd century children's graves portray the deities pushing around small discs. Hermes and Eros are sometimes depicted rolling wheels on Roman gemstones. The presence of the wheel in these images may reference the goddess Tyche, who was connected to the Rota Fortunae, a symbol representing the unpredictability and volatility of the natural world.

Roman children would receive toys as gifts for their birthdays or other ceremonies. For most children, their toys were made by their parents. Children in wealthier families usually had toys made by skilled craftsmen. Wealthier families could afford toys made from more expensive materials, such as ivory. Roman children likely would have made use of household objects or common materials such as sticks, hands, spindle whorls, loom weights, stones, broken pottery, and possibly earth as makeshift toys.

=== Dolls ===
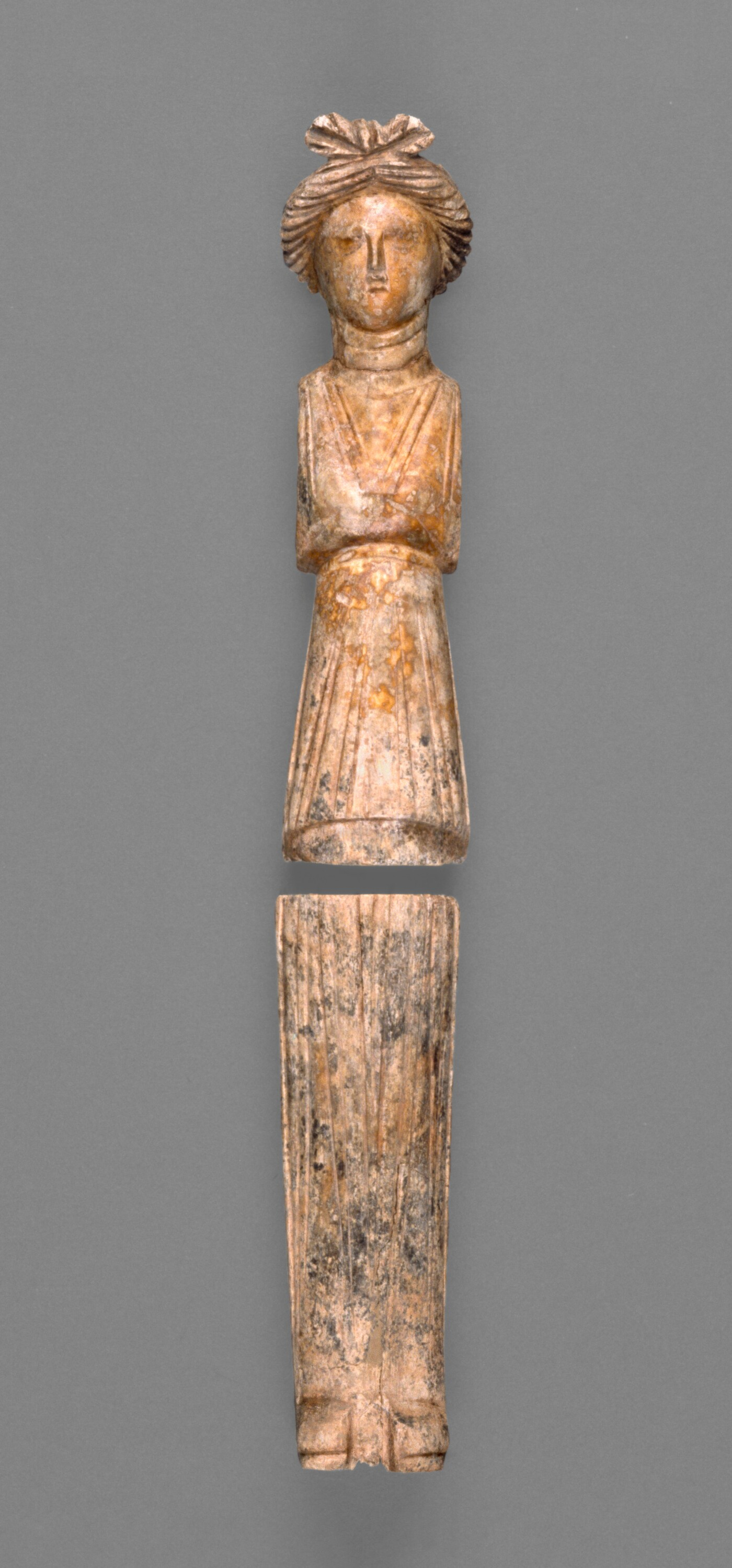
Fragmentary Roman doll carved from bone, late 3rd century AD (Getty Villa Roman Collection)

Dolls, typically made from bone, terracotta, cloth, alabaster, wood, wax, marble, or ivory were popular toys for ancient Roman girls. Jointed limbs connected by a peg device capable of facilitating flexible movement were also present in Roman dolls. Dolls with detachable limbs have been found in the Catacombs of Priscilla and Callixtus. Roman dolls often display physical similarities to empresses or other prominent figures. Resemblances to prominent women may not stem from an attempt to mimic specific, individual women; instead, Roman doll manufacturers may have sought to imitate styles associated with typical aristocratic women at the time. Faustina the Elder and Faustina the Younger were two Roman empresses often lauded in Imperial imagery for their status as wives and mothers. They exemplified the Roman ideal of fecunditas, meaning "fertility." Roman dolls depicting these figures may have been used for similar purposes as other portrayals of these figures: to promote Roman ideals of motherhood.

Ancient Roman dolls contained features such as accentuated breasts and detailed secondary sex characteristics such as wide hips, protruding bellies, accentuated breasts, and marked-out pubes. Designs of Roman dolls were consistent with Roman ideals of femininity and their beauty standards for women. Roman girls adorned their dolls with fashion or jewelry according to the female fashion styles of ancient Rome. The dolls may have been designed to portray the Roman ideal of a housewife and to encourage young girls to imitate Roman standards of femininity. Horace mentions a tradition in which Roman girls dedicated the dolls to the Lares, household guardians, upon reaching adulthood. Persius mentions a similar custom in which Roman girls dedicated their dolls to Venus before marriage. Roman male dolls existed; they were possibly intended to be used by boys. One remnant of the torso of a Roman soldier doll was found in Lyon, in the grave of a 10-year-old Roman girl named Claudia Victoria. Figures of gladiators, actors, soldiers, and slaves were popular toys. Gladiator dolls had mobile limbs, creating an illusion of lifelike movements.

By the 3rd and 4th centuries, a more stylized type of doll became popular in ancient Rome. Dolls of this type utilized lines and incisions to indicate anatomical detail. Instead of molded breasts, manufacturers utilized oblique incisions to depict breasts. Similarly, V-shaped incisions were used to mark the pubis. Examples of stylized figures with similar incisions from southern Umbria and Ostia were likely carved from a single piece of bone. The joints of these dolls were connected by a thread running through the arm or leg that runs through the torso of the doll. In another doll found in Hawara, a thread of red yarn was used to attach the arms to the body, to hold up the skirt, and to highlight the breasts. Other examples of Roman dolls from Hawara were also decorated with paint. One doll had its nipples marked with red paint; another had its eyebrows colored with black paint. Like earlier styles of Roman dolls, the newer style contained highly detailed faces with elaborate and sharp incisions.

== See also ==
- Bear games
