= Pseudo-Ovid =

Pseudonym

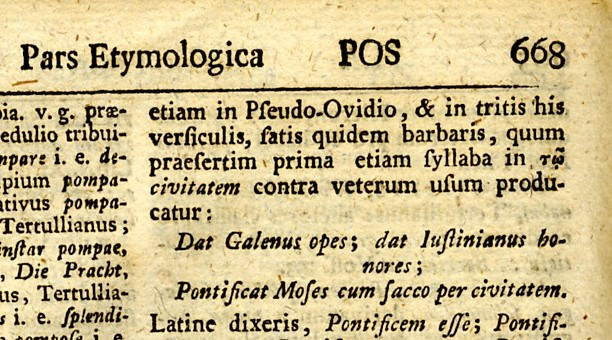
Earliest recorded use of "Pseudo-Ovidius" (1744)

Pseudo-Ovid or Pseudo-Ovidius is the name conventionally used to designate any author of a work falsely attributed to the Latin poet Ovid (43 BC – AD 17/18). The term first appears in the second edition of the Lexicon Latinae Linguae Antibarbarum Quadripartitum of Johann Friedrich Nolte in 1744. The collective term for such texts is Pseudo-Ovidiana, which may be defined simply as "works not authored by Ovid that circulated under his name".

An English translation of the collective Pseudo-Ovidiana was published as part of the Dumbarton Oaks Medieval Library in 2020 under the title Appendix Ovidiana, by analogy with the Appendix Vergiliana.

== Classification ==
There are several types of pseudo-Ovidian text. Some texts were intentionally written in Ovid's name as literary forgeries. In other instances, anonymous texts attracted an attribution to Ovid. Many of these convincingly imitate Ovid, but the motivations and expectations of their actual authors are largely unknown. Another class of pseudo-Ovidian text are interpolations in other authentic works of Ovid.

Some works were only "intermittently Ovidian", that is, they were only occasionally ascribed to Ovid, like the Conflictus veris et hiemis, which was also attributed to Vergil, and the Birria, which was in fact by Vitalis of Blois. According to Ralph Hexter, Wilken Engelbrecht suggests that "when teachers and students relied for their study of the auctores [authors] increasingly on florilegia and excerpts, imitations of Ovid crafted only two centuries earlier could more readily be mistaken as ancient productions". Hexter has suggested the term "para-Ovidian" as an alternative, since the prefix "pseudo-" is often taken to imply deception.

Mere imitation of Ovid, popular throughout antiquity and the Middle Ages, does not constitute Pseudo-Ovidiana. Neither does the use of Ovid's name or persona in an overt work of fiction constitute Pseudo-Ovidiana. Baudri of Bourgueil wrote an exchange of letters between Florus and Ovid in the style of the Heroides, but they were always understood as works of fiction and correctly ascribed to Baudri.

== Questionable works ==
The authenticity of several of the 21 letters found in Ovid's Heroides has been questioned. The same is true of the couplets that introduce each letter. Any inauthentic material would, by definition, be pseudo-Ovidian, although "the Heroides themselves pose a challenge to any stable concept of authenticity, since Ovid the author prides himself on masquerading in turn as Penelope, Phyllis, Briseis, Dido, Oenone et al." In the fifteenth century, Juan Rodríguez del Padrón passed off three letters of his own—Carta de Madreselua a Manseol, Troylos a Brecayda and Brecayda a Troylo—as Ovid's in his Bursario, otherwise a Castilian translation of Heroides. Soon after, the Italian humanist Angelo Sabino composed letters that were included in editions of the Heroides and at times accepted as Ovid's own work. Imitation of Classical sources was characteristic of Renaissance literary production, and the categories of creative imitation, impersonation, and forgery often elude certainty about the author's intention.

Several excerpts of Ovid's Amores circulated independently during the Middle Ages. One of these, Amores 3.5, which appeared under the titles De somno and De rustico, has often had its authenticity doubted.

Two poems datable to the first century have been ascribed to Ovid, but are suspect. Halieutica was accepted as Ovid's by Pliny the Elder, but has been doubted on grounds of style. Nux, on the other hand, is one of the best Ovidian imitations if it is not authentic. It was treated as Ovid's by Conrad of Hirsau, who included it in his accessus ad auctores, and Desiderius Erasmus, who published a commentary on it.

== List of pseudo-Ovidian works ==
- Argumenta Aeneidis, introductory verse summaries of the Aeneid included in the Latin Anthology
- Consolatio ad Liviam de morte Drusi (1st century), only attributed to Ovid from the 16th century
- De cuculo, also attributed to Alcuin of York, attributed to Ovid beginning in the 12th century
- De Lombardo et lumaca, a political satire written against Frederick Barbarossa following the battle of Legnano (1176)
- De luco, also called De nemore or Conflictus Voluptatis et Diogienis
- De lupo, also called De monacho
- De medicamine surdi, also known as De medicamine aurium, De speculo medicaminis, De speculo medicinae or De herbarum virtutibus, inspired perhaps by Pliny's reference to Ovid's verse recipe for a cure for angina
- De mirabilibus mundi, a medieval bestiary
- De nuce
- De pediculo (before 1250), a poem about a louse modeled on De pulice
- De philomela (10th century)
- De puellis
- De pulice (12th/13th century), "a versified dirty joke" about the flea (pulex) based on the poem about the gnat (culex) found in the Appendix Vergiliana
- De quattuor humoribus
- De sompnio, an apocalyptic allegory presented as a dream
- De vetula, the longest of the Pseudo-Ovidiana
- De ventre, also called Altercatio ventris et artuum, De quattuor elementis or De quattuor complexionisbu hominum, a debate between the parts of the body
- De vino, also called De Baccho, actually by Eugene of Toledo
- Doctrina mense (13th/14th century)
- Eligia de ludo scacchorum, a poem on chess
- Elegiae in Maecenatem (1st century), only attributed to Ovid from the 16th century
- Ovidius puellarum, also called De nuntio sagaci, an imitation of Ovid cited as his work in the Tegernsee love letters
- Tetrasticha in cunctis libris Vergilii, verses praisings Vergil's Aeneid, Eclogues and Georgics

Excerpts of the 12th-century poem Facetus: Moribus et vita circulated under Ovid's name as supposed pieces of the authentic Ars amatoria and Remedia amoris. They have been labelled the "Pseudo-Ars" and "Pseudo-Remedia".

== Reception ==
In the Middle Ages, many of the works now regarded as pseudo-Ovidian were generally accepted. Medieval biographies of Ovid generally regard them as productions of his later years, after Amores and Heroides. In the fifteenth century, on the other hand, Sicco Polenton argued that they were early works. Until the thirteenth century, few manuscripts contain more than a single pseudo-Ovidian work, but thereafter mixed collections containing many authentic and inauthentic works are common.

Some works that were never attributed to Ovid in the Latin tradition, came to be seen as his in the vernacular. Thus, Pamphilus was treated as his work in French and Spanish writings, as in Juan Ruiz's Libro de buen amor.

== Works cited ==
- Ghisalberti, Fausto (1946). "Mediaeval Biographies of Ovid". Journal of the Warburg and Courtauld Institutes. 9 (1): 10–59. doi:10.2307/750308.
- Hexter, Ralph J. (2011). "Shades of Ovid: Pseudo- (and Para-) Ovidiana in the Middle Ages". In James G. Clark; Frank T. Coulson; Kathryn L. McKinley (eds.). Ovid in the Middle Ages. Cambridge University Press. pp. 284–309. ISBN 9781107002050.
- Hexter, Ralph J.; Pfuntner, Laura; Haynes, Justin, eds. (2020). Appendix Ovidiana: Latin Poems Ascribed to Ovid in the Middle Ages. Harvard University Press.
- Knox, Peter E. (2013) [2009]. "Lost and Spurious Works". A Companion to Ovid. Blackwell Companions to the Ancient World. Wiley Blackwell. pp. 207–216.
