= Dialogus =

Dialogus (Latin for dialogue) can refer to:

- Dialogus de oratoribus (c. 100 AD), treatise on rhetoric attributed to Tacitus
- Dialogus de musica (c. 11th c.), music treatise formerly attributed to Odo of Arezzo
- Dialogus de Scaccario (12th c.), treatise on the English Exchequer
- Dialogus super auctores (c. 1130), an introduction to the classics by Conrad of Hirsau
- Dialogus creaturarum (c. 1480), collection of Latin fables
