= Prior Analytics =

Work of Aristotle pertaining to logic

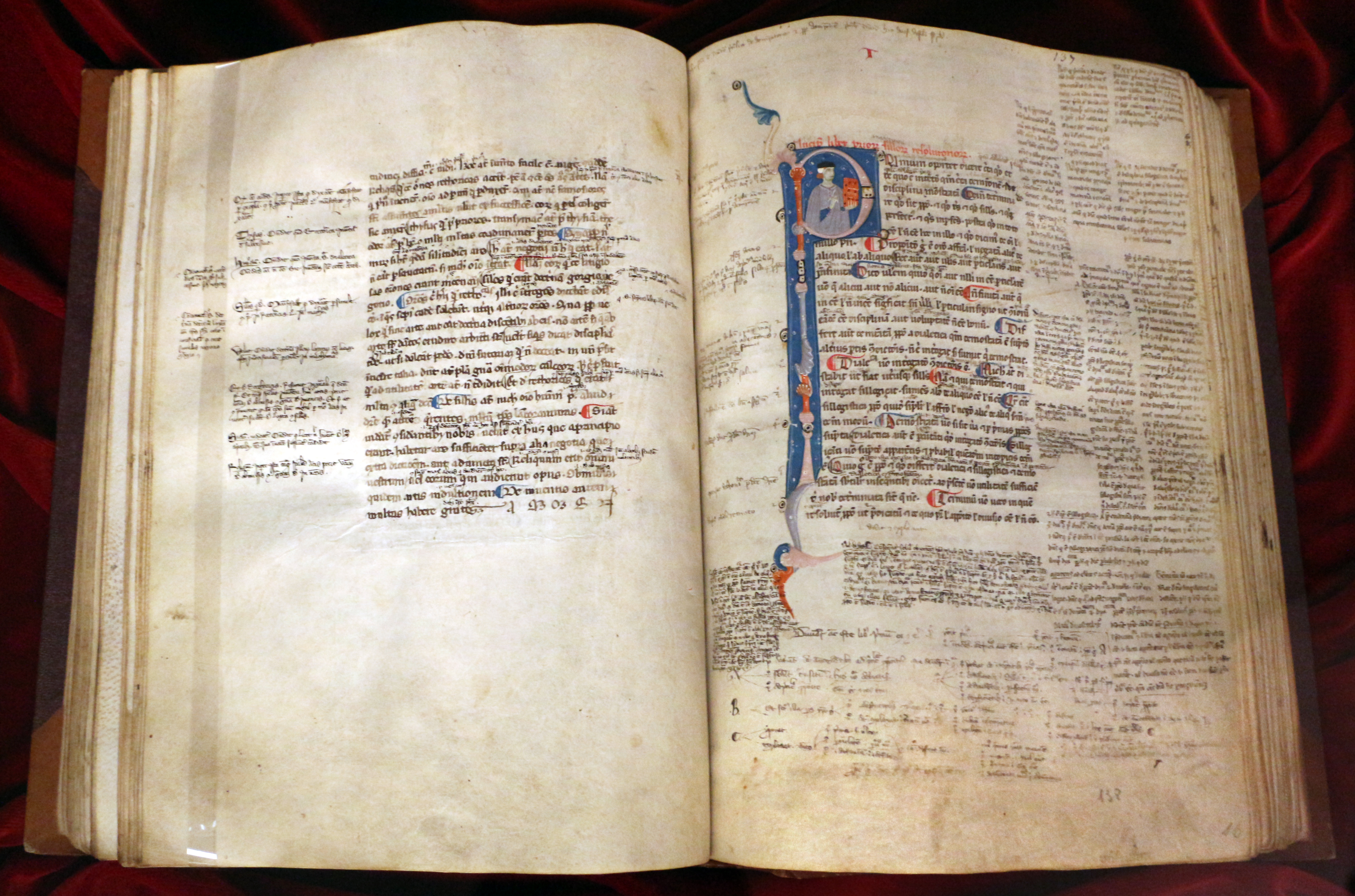
Aristotle Prior Analytics in Latin, 1290 circa, Biblioteca Medicea Laurenziana, Florence

The Prior Analytics (Ancient Greek: Ἀναλυτικὰ Πρότερα; Latin: Analytica Priora) is a work by Aristotle on reasoning, known as syllogistic, composed around 350 BC. Being one of the six extant Aristotelian writings on logic and scientific method, it is part of what later Peripatetics called the Organon.

The term analytics comes from the Greek words analytos (ἀναλυτός, 'solvable') and analyo (ἀναλύω, 'to solve', literally 'to loose'). However, in Aristotle's corpus, there are distinguishable differences in the meaning of ἀναλύω and its cognates. There is also the possibility that Aristotle may have borrowed his use of the word "analysis" from his teacher Plato. On the other hand, the meaning that best fits the Analytics is one derived from the study of Geometry and this meaning is very close to what Aristotle calls episteme (επιστήμη), knowing the reasoned facts. Therefore, Analysis is the process of finding the reasoned facts.

In the Analytics then, Prior Analytics is the first theoretical part dealing with the science of deduction and the Posterior Analytics is the second demonstratively practical part. Prior Analytics gives an account of deductions in general narrowed down to three basic syllogisms while Posterior Analytics deals with demonstration.

== Contents ==
=== Book 1 ===
In the first book of the Prior Analytics, Aristotle begins by defining foundational concepts:

1. Premise, a statement that affirms or denies something of an object, which he divides in two different ways:
  1. By quantity (the extension of the subject): Universal for all or none of the subject in matter "All humans are animals", particular when it is part of the subject "Some humans are male", and indefinite when it is not any the other categorizations, lacking a quantifier "Justice is good";
  2. According to how it is obtained: Demonstrative if it is true and based on fundamental postulates, dialetical if it assumes the most plausible answer between two contradictory statements for the sake of argument. These definitions are discussed in more depth in the work Topics;
2. Term The components into which a premise is resolved—namely, the predicate and the subject of which it is predicated. It is crucial to understand that Aristotle's logic is categorical. It operates within his framework of categories, placing special emphasis on "substance" as the primary subject. For Aristotle, premises are fundamentally structured in the standard form "A is B" (or "B is predicated of A").
3. Syllogism A discourse or formal analysis in which, once certain premises are laid down, a resulting conclusion necessarily follows from them.

Following these definitions, Aristotle analyzes the various types of syllogisms. This analysis is essential for understanding his philosophy of science, which centers around a specific type of syllogism: the demonstration. Throughout the work, Aristotle extensively explores the implications of different modal premises in syllogisms—namely, the problematic (possible), assertoric (factual), and apodictic (necessary). This book also introduces the concept of the three syllogistic figures.

==== The three figures ====
In any valid syllogism, one specific term must appear in both premises to logically bridge them. Aristotle called this the middle term. Depending on the syntactic position of this middle term within the propositions (whether it serves as the subject or the predicate in the premises), the argument is classified into one of three figures. A fourth figure was later formalized by subsequent logicians, but it was not originally posited by Aristotle.

	First Figure	Second Figure	Third Figure	Fourth Figure
	Predicate — Subject	Predicate — Subject	Predicate — Subject	Predicate — Subject
Major Premise	B — A	B — A	A — B	A — B
Minor Premise	C — B	B — C	C — B	B — C
Conclusion	A — — C	A — — C	A — — C	A — — C

The relations between Predicate and Subject in these inferences can be:

- (A) Universal Affirmative: All S is P (e.g., "All humans are mortal").
- (E) Universal Negative: No S is P (e.g., "No humans are mortal").
- (I) Particular Affirmative: Some S is P (e.g., "Some humans are mortal").
- (O) Particular Negative: Some S is not P (e.g., "Some humans are not mortal").

Not all combinations of these relations yield a valid logical conclusion in every figure. To memorize which combinations (moods) are valid for each figure, medieval scholastic logicians developed clever mnemonic names — such as Barbara, Celarent, Darii, and Ferio. In these mnemonics, the vowels correspond exactly to the sequence of propositions (Major premise, Minor premise, Conclusion) required to form a valid syllogism.

=== Book 2 ===
Book II of the Prior Analytics centers on the properties of syllogisms, the derivation of conclusions from false premises, and other related forms of argumentation. Special attention is given to two distinct types of logical demonstration:

- Circular (or Reciprocal) Demonstration: This consists of proving a premise by means of the conclusion—essentially using the conclusion of a syllogism to prove one of its own original premises. Aristotle explains that such a proof is only logically valid if the subject-predicate relations can be perfectly inverted, meaning the terms must be coextensive (or conceptually equal). However, he argues that if one must assume all the converses of the original syllogism to be true, the circular demonstration becomes epistemically trivial (akin to proving that "A is A"); thus, it holds no actual demonstrative or scientific value.
- Demonstration per Impossibile (Reduction to Absurdity): Analogous to modern proof by contradiction, this method aims to prove a statement by initially assuming its contradictory to be true. By combining this assumed premise with another known true premise, the per impossibile demonstration yields a conclusion that is clearly impossible or absurd, thereby proving that the initial assumption was false and the desired conclusion must be true.

(Note on direct proofs): This indirect method is fundamentally contrasted with Ostensive Proof (direct demonstration) in the work. While a demonstration per impossibile relies on forcing a logical absurdity, an ostensive proof establishes its conclusion directly and positively from a set of accepted premises, without the need to assume a contradiction. Alternatively, when one refutes a universal premise merely by presenting a specific incompatible example, it is known as providing a counterexample.

Aristotle also discusses about how partial knowledge and knowledge acquisition is possible by using Syllogisms as means of illustrating it, and how can one make a mistake, he explicitly contrasts this way of interpreting the obtaining of knowledge with Plato's book "Meno", on which his teacher argues that all knowledge is via remembering knowledge the soul already had due to its previous existence in the world of Forms. To Aristotle, a mistake is possible by not knowing the universal, or failing to recognize that the particular is part of a universal.

Aristotle talks about how induction is possible: By establishing a relation between an extreme term and a middle term via another extreme term using the possibility of conversion. If we can convert the minor premise (the relationship between the particulars and the trait), we can treat the particulars as the middle term. If A is true of all C, and B is also true of all C, but we also know C is true of all B (the converse), we can only conclude A is true of B. He gives an example: Let A be "long-living", B be "without bile", and C be the particular cases, "such as the horse, the human, and the mule" (which he treats as the sum of all particular cases). We observe that A is true of all C (these animals are long-living), and B is true of all C (these animals are bileless). If we can convert the relation between B and C—proving that C is true of all B (meaning our list of animals encompasses all bileless creatures)—we can logically bridge the gap. Because A is true of C, and C is now convertible with B, we can conclude that A is true of B: all bileless creatures are long-living. Thinking about the relations in set theory relations, the proof is similar to:

1. The first assumptions:
  - $C\subseteq A$;
  - $C\subseteq B$.
2. The converse:
  - $B\subseteq C$, and therefore $B= C$;
3. The conclusion:
  - $B(=C)\subseteq A$

Aristotle also talks about four more fundamental parts of a discussion:

- A paradigm is when one shows that the extreme term can be applied to the middle term by using as proof/example something similar to the other extreme term. For example, if A is true to all B, and B is to all C, than A is to all C, but in order to show that A is true to all B, D is given as an example, being similar to C. This is not a syllogism, and has a critical difference from induction, even it is similar: Paradigms do not depend on conversability, that is, D will not be "the sum of all particular cases" to prove the relationship between A and B;
- A reduction is when, by adding a middle term, one can have more confidence in the connection between the extreme terms. If we are uncertain that A is true for all C, but we know that A is true for all B and we have more reason to believe that B is true for all C than we had for A for all C, by adding the middle term, we gain confidence in the affirmation that A is true for all C;
- An objection is a premiss that is either contradictory or a contrary to another premiss;
- An enthymeme is a syllogism based on signs and probabilities, making analyses under uncertainty.

== Legacy ==
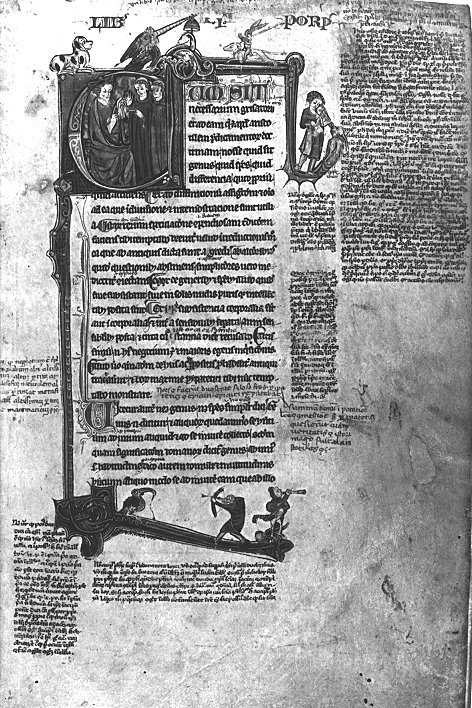
Page from a 13th/14th-century Latin transcript of Aristotle's Opera Logica.

Aristotle's Prior Analytics represents the first time in history when Logic is scientifically investigated. On those grounds alone, Aristotle could be considered the Father of Logic for as he himself says in Sophistical Refutations, "When it comes to this subject, it is not the case that part had been worked out before in advance and part had not; instead, nothing existed at all." In this text, one can also find the orthodox way of referring to undetermined variables by using letters instead of examples ('all A is B' instead of 'all humans are animals'). The idea of generalizing variables in this manner, which is ubiquitous by today's standards, began with Aristotle.

=== Ancient commentaries ===
In the third century AD, Alexander of Aphrodisias's commentary on the Prior Analytics is the oldest extant and one of the best of the ancient tradition and is available in the English language.

In the sixth century, Boethius composed the first known Latin translation of the Prior Analytics, however, this translation has not survived, and the Prior Analytics may have been unavailable in Western Europe until the eleventh century, when it was quoted from by Bernard of Utrecht.

The so-called Anonymus Aurelianensis III from the second half of the twelfth century is the first extant Latin commentary, or rather fragment of a commentary.

=== Modern reception ===
Modern work on Aristotle's logic builds on the tradition started in 1951 with the establishment by Jan Łukasiewicz of a revolutionary paradigm. His approach was replaced in the early 1970s in a series of papers by John Corcoran and Timothy Smiley—which inform modern translations of Prior Analytics by Robin Smith in 1989 and Gisela Striker in 2009.

A problem in meaning arises in the study of Prior Analytics for the word syllogism as used by Aristotle in general does not carry the same narrow connotation as it does at present; Aristotle defines this term in a way that would apply to a wide range of valid arguments. In the Prior Analytics, Aristotle defines syllogism as "a deduction in a discourse in which, certain things being supposed, something different from the things supposed results of necessity because these things are so." In modern times, this definition has led to a debate as to how the word "syllogism" should be interpreted. At present, syllogism is used exclusively as the method used to reach a conclusion closely resembling the "syllogisms" of traditional logic texts: two premises followed by a conclusion each of which is a categorical sentence containing all together three terms, two extremes which appear in the conclusion and one middle term which appears in both premises but not in the conclusion. Some scholars prefer to use the word "deduction" instead as the meaning given by Aristotle to the Greek word syllogismos (συλλογισμός). Scholars Jan Lukasiewicz, Józef Maria Bocheński and Günther Patzig have sided with the Protasis-Apodosis dichotomy while John Corcoran prefers to consider a syllogism as simply a deduction.

== See also ==
- Law of identity
- Reductio ad absurdum
- Term logic

== Bibliography ==
Greek text

- Aristotle. Analytica Priora et Posteriora. Ed. Ross and Minio-Paluello. Oxford University Press, 1981. ISBN 9780198145622.
- Aristotle. Categories; On Interpretation; Prior Analytics. Greek text with translation by H. P. Cooke, Hugh Tredennick. Loeb Classical Library 325. Cambridge, MA: Harvard University Press, 1938. ISBN 9780674993594.

Translations

- Aristotle, Prior Analytics, translated by Robin Smith, Indianapolis: Hackett, 1989.
- Aristotle, Prior Analytics Book I, translated by Gisela Striker, Oxford: Clarendon Press 2009.

Studies

- Corcoran, John (ed.), 1974. Ancient Logic and its Modern Interpretations., Dordrecht: Reidel.
- Corcoran, John, 1974a. "Aristotle's Natural Deduction System". Ancient Logic and its Modern Interpretations, pp. 85-131.
- Lukasiewicz, Jan, 1957. Aristotle's Syllogistic from the Standpoint of Modern Formal Logic. 2nd edition. Oxford: Clarendon Press.
- Smiley, Timothy. 1973. "What Is a Syllogism?", Journal of Philosophical Logic, 2, pp.136-154.
