= The Book of Good Love =

Book by Juan Ruiz

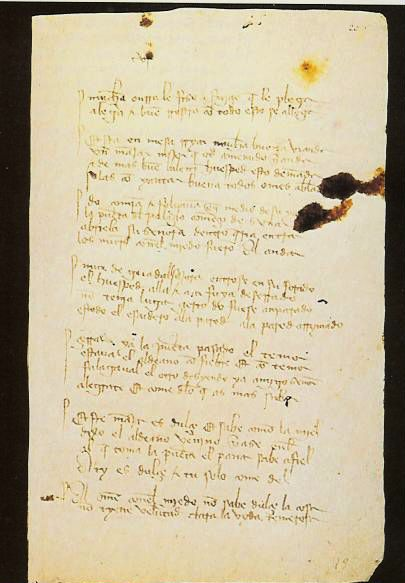
- Author: Juan Ruiz Archpriest of Hita
- Original title: El libro del buen amor
- Language: Medieval Spanish
- Genre: mester de clerecía
- Publisher: None
- Publication date: 1330; expansion completed 1343
- Publication place: Spain
- Media type: Manuscript

The Book of Good Love (Spanish: El libro de buen amor), considered to be one of the masterpieces of Spanish poetry, is a pseudo-biographical account of romantic adventures by Juan Ruiz, the Archpriest of Hita, the earliest version of which dates from 1330; the author completed it with revisions and expansions in 1343.

The work is considered the best piece in the medieval genre known as mester de clerecía.

The Book begins with prayers and a guide as to how to read the work, followed by stories each containing a moral and often comical tale.

The book contains a heterogeneous collection of various materials united around an alleged autobiographical narrative of the love affairs of the author, who is represented by the episodic character of Don Melón de la Huerta in part of the book. In the book, all layers of late medieval Spanish society are represented through their lovers.

Fables and apologues are interspersed throughout the course of the main argument that constitute a collection of exempla. Likewise, you can find allegories, moralities, sermons, and songs of the blind and of Goliardic- type schoolchildren. Profane lyrical compositions (serranillas, often parodic, derived from the pastorelas) are also included alongside other religious ones, such as hymns and couplets to the Virgin or Christ.

The narrative materials are based on the parody of medieval elegiac comedies in Latin from a pseudo-Ovidian school setting, such as De vetula and Pamphilus, in which the author is the protagonist of amorous adventures that alternate with poems related to him or her. Pamphilus is also cited in the Book of Good Love as the basis for the episode of Don Melón and Doña Endrina. In addition to materials derived from Ovid’s Ars Amatoria, it also parodies the liturgy of the canonical hours or epics and in combat of Carnival ("Don Carnal") and Lent ("Doña Cuaresma"). Other genres that can be found in the Book are planhz, such as Trotaconventos' death, a character that constitutes the clearest precedent for La Celestina or satires, such as those directed against female owners or the equalizing power of money; or fables, from the medieval aesopic tradition or pedagogical manuals, such as Facetus, which considers romantic education as part of human learning. Although Arabic sources have been proposed, current criticism favors the belief that The Book of Good Love descends from medieval clerical Latin literature.

== Manuscripts ==
There are three existing manuscripts of the Book of Good Love, none of which are complete, whose divergences made Ramón Menéndez Pidal think that he could respond to two different redactions made by the author in different moments of his life:

- Manuscript “S” named after its origin Salamanca; specifically from the Colegio Mayor de San Bartolomé. It was in the Royal Library of Madrid for a time and is now in the Library of the University of Salamanca (ms. 2663). The handwriting reveals that it is from the beginning of the 15th century and is the most complete, as it incorporates additions that are not in the other two. The colophon is attributed to Alonso de Paradinas.
- Manuscript “G” named after its time belonging to Benito Martínez Gayoso. Today, it can be found in the Library of the Royal Spanish Academy. It is dated at the end of the 15th century.
- Manuscript “T” named after having belonged to the Toledo Cathedral. Today, it is kept in the National Library of Spain. It is considered to have been written at the end of the 14th century.

== Theme and structure ==
The Book of Good Love is a varied and extensive composition of 1728 stanzas, centering on the fictitious autobiography of Juan Ruiz, Archpriest of Hita. Today three manuscripts of the work survive: the Toledo (T) and Gayoso (G) manuscripts originating from the fourteenth century, and the Salamanca (S) manuscript copied at the start of the fifteenth century by Alonso de Paradinas. All three manuscripts have various pages missing, which prevents a complete reading of the book, and the manuscripts vary extensively from each other due to the diversions of the authors. The work most commonly read today was suggested by Ramón Menéndez Pidal in 1898 based on sections from all three manuscripts.

The title by which the work is known today was proposed by Menéndez Pidal in 1898, based on different passages from the book, especially those from frame 933b, whose first hemistich reads “Good Love' said to the book.”

As for the date of writing, it varies according to the manuscript: in one, the author affirms that he finished it in 1330, and in another in 1343; this last date would be a revision of the 1330 version in which Juan Ruiz added new compositions.

The book is famous for its variety of:

1. Content (exempla, love stories, serranillas, didactic elements, lyrical compositions, etc.)
2. Meter (the cuaderna via, sixteen syllabic verses, Zejelesque stanzas, etc.)
3. Tone (serious, festive, religious, profane, etc.)

The work is composed of the following:

- The introduction, where the author explains how the book should be interpreted. It consists of a prayer in cuaderna via to God and the Virgin in which he requests their help, a proem in prose that adopts the genre of cult sermon (or divisio intra, but written in Spanish) that could be parodic, another prayer invoking the divine favor to finish the book, and finally ending with two lyrical couplets to Santa María.
- A fictitious autobiography of the author in which he tells us of his relationships with women of different origin and social status: a nun, a Moor, a housewife he spied praying, a baker, a noble woman and several mountain women (serranas), often helped by another woman named Urraca, better known as Trotaconventos (Trots-between-monasteries).
- A collection of exempla (apologues, fables and stories), which serve as moral lessons and closure for the episodes.
- The dispute between the author and Love (Don Amor, an allegorical character), in which he accuses Love of being the cause of the seven mortal sins.
- The tale of the love affairs of Mr. Melon (don Melón) and Mrs. Endrina (dona Endrina), an adaptation of the medieval elegiac comedy Pamphilus de amore.
- The allegorical account of the battle between Carnival ("Don Carnal") and Lent ("Doña Cuaresma"), which is really a parody on medieval deeds.
- A commentary of "Ars Amandi" (Art of Love) by Ovid
- A series of religious lyrical compositions, typically dedicated to Mary, mother of Jesus
- A number of profane lyrical compositions, such as that upon the death of “Trotaconventos.”

== Interpretation ==
The title The Book of Good Love is inferred from the text, and who or what Good Love may be is not revealed by the author.

The Book of Good Love explains how men must be careful about Love that can be Good (el buen amor) or Foolish (el loco amor). The Good Love is God's one and is preferred to the Foolish Love which only makes men sin. Juan Ruiz gives the reader a lot of examples to explain his theory and avoid Foolish Love in the name of the Good one.

Due to its heterogeneity, the intention of the work is ambiguous. At certain points, it honors devoted love, while at others, it speaks highly of the skill involved in carnal love.

Menéndez Pelayo was the first to point out the Goliardic character of the work, although he denied that there was any attack against dogmas or insurrection against authority, which others later confirmed to be an attitude characteristic of Goliardish poetry.

Specialists have also discussed the possible didactic nature of the Book of Good Love. Authors such as José Amador de los Ríos, Leo Spitzer or María Rosa Lida de Malkiel defend didacticism as an inseparable part of the work. However, authors such as Américo Castro and Sánchez Albornoz deny it, and consider Juan Ruiz to be more cynical than moralistic and more hypocritical than pious. Juan Luis Alborg, in turn, analogizes the work to the way in which Cervantes used chivalric novels to shed his own irony and personal vision; similarly, Juan Luis Alborg asserts that "the Archpriest is contained within medieval didactic forms.” In this sense, the book can also be read as a parody of the epic genre.

His work reflects the multiculturalism of Toledo of his time. Among the various women he tries to make love to (the only case in which he has carnal relations occurs when the mountain-dweller "La Chata" assaults him, although the savage mountain-dwellers were characters of a highly typified literary genre) there is a Moor, and he boasts of his talent as a musician, composing music for Andalusian and Jewish dance. Also during the battle between Don Carnal and Doña Cuaresma he travels to the “aljama” or town hall of Toledo, where the butchers and rabbis invite him to spend a "good day." María Rosa Lida de Malkiel wanted to see the influence of the genre of narrative in rhymed prose, the maqāmat, cultivated by several peninsular authors in Arabic and Hebrew during the XII-XIV centuries.

The book also contains a passage in which a Goliardish-type protest is presented against the position of Gil de Albornoz who intended to extend the papal doctrine of compulsory celibacy to his diocese. This clashed with the Hispanic tradition of the barraganía or contract of coexistence of a priest with a woman, a custom more established in a multicultural territory such as the diocese of Toledo, once the source of the heresy of Elipando's adoptionism, generated by the coexistence between Jews, Muslims and Christians. This is expressed in the "Canticle of the clerics of Talavera,” where he angrily protests against the provisions of the archbishop against the barraganía in the archdiocese. Such a protest was the one that could lead to the prison on the part of the archbishop. This critical stance towards the high clergy, like the rest of the lighthearted and critical content of his book, makes it akin to Goliardish literature.

Daniel Eisenberg posited that "good love," for Juan Ruiz, meant love for the owner, the single woman, who was neither a virgin nor married. The "bad love" against which a spear breaks was the love of the "garzones" or bachelors. Instead of the unbearable young man (Don Hurón), one can choose that which the text below presents: the "small owner." While the intention of the Libro has typically been discussed in philological and poststructuralist terms as an ars amoris, a doctrinal work, a parody, or a work that fashions the ambiguity of the linguistic sign, Juan Escourido contends that the poem's intention, anthropology, and legitimation are founded on an aesthetics of joy.
