= De vetula =

13th-century Latin comedy

De vetula ("On the Old Woman") is a long 13th-century elegiac comedy written in Latin. It is pseudepigraphically signed "Ovidius", and in its time was attributed to the classical Latin poet Ovid. It consists of three books of hexameters, and was quoted by Roger Bacon. In its slight plot, the aging Ovid is duped by a go-between, and renounces love affairs. Its interest to modern readers lies in the discursive padding of the story.

== Attribution ==
For a long time, the author of De Vetula was wrongly acclaimed as Ovid; this was largely due to rumors that his tomb had been opened in Tomis, and the discovery of an adjacent ivory capsule. That it was found in the ivory capsule nicknamed the ‘Nulla Tempeslate Consumpla.’ The canister had been taken to Constantinople for analysis, because it was written in an illiterate area, and required proper translation from Latin. During the time of its publication, however was the 12th and 13th Centuries, which were nicknamed “Aetas Ovidiana,” the Age of Ovidian. With the rise in universities, medieval works often reflect a blend of contemporary and classical influences. Given this factor and the heightened interest in Ovid's work, it would make sense that the pseudo-Ovidian poem would be attributed to him, as the clear inspiration taken by the author of De Vetula, even naming the main character Ovid.

In more recent years, however, scholars have shifted away from attributing the work to Richard of Fournival, and today rumors point to Rodger Bacon. In his work titled Opus Maius, Bacon references De Vetula directly; this was one of the only recorded times the poem is cited in another work.

There was a translation or paraphrase of the 1370s into French as La vieille ("The Old Woman") by Jean Le Fèvre. This was followed by a Catalan prose translation Ovidi enamorat by Bernat Metge in the 1380s.

The work was first printed around 1475.

== Rodger Bacon ==
A scholar of Aristotle, Roger Bacon’s work focused heavily on language, humanities, and sciences. In his efforts to reform university education in the late 13th-Century, he advocated integrating healthcare education. Not long after joining the Franciscan Order in the mid 1260’s, Bacon was commissioned by Pope Clement IV in 1266 to produce Opus Majus, along with the related Opus Minus and Opus Tertium. In these works, the oldest known reference to De Vetula strengthens the hypothesis that he was the author. Due to his clear connections to both the main themes and the poem's knowledge, some historians have considered Bacon's involvement in the authorship; however, this remains only a theory.

== Probability Calculus ==
In the world of calculus, De Veluta has been accredited as the earliest surviving record of randomized probability.

The author focuses heavily on the writer's struggle with gambling, alongside this is the world of probability in games.

In book one, the author discusses multiple games such as: table games, checkers, chess and rithmomachia which stands out the most. Due to its mathematical background depends on the numbers which are on the pieces, unlike the similar game of chess. The writer throws three dice calculating the sum of each face, even correctly calculating all 216 results of rolling three dice. Giving an explanation of the connection between the number of combinations and the expected frequency of a given total.

In the second and third book, the author makes a big shift to focusing solely on games of dice and mathematics. Most notably with rithmomachia coming front and center.

== Non-poetic content ==
It existed in numerous manuscripts, and is of independent interest because of its references to astronomy and gambling. Another pastime given extended treatment is fishing.

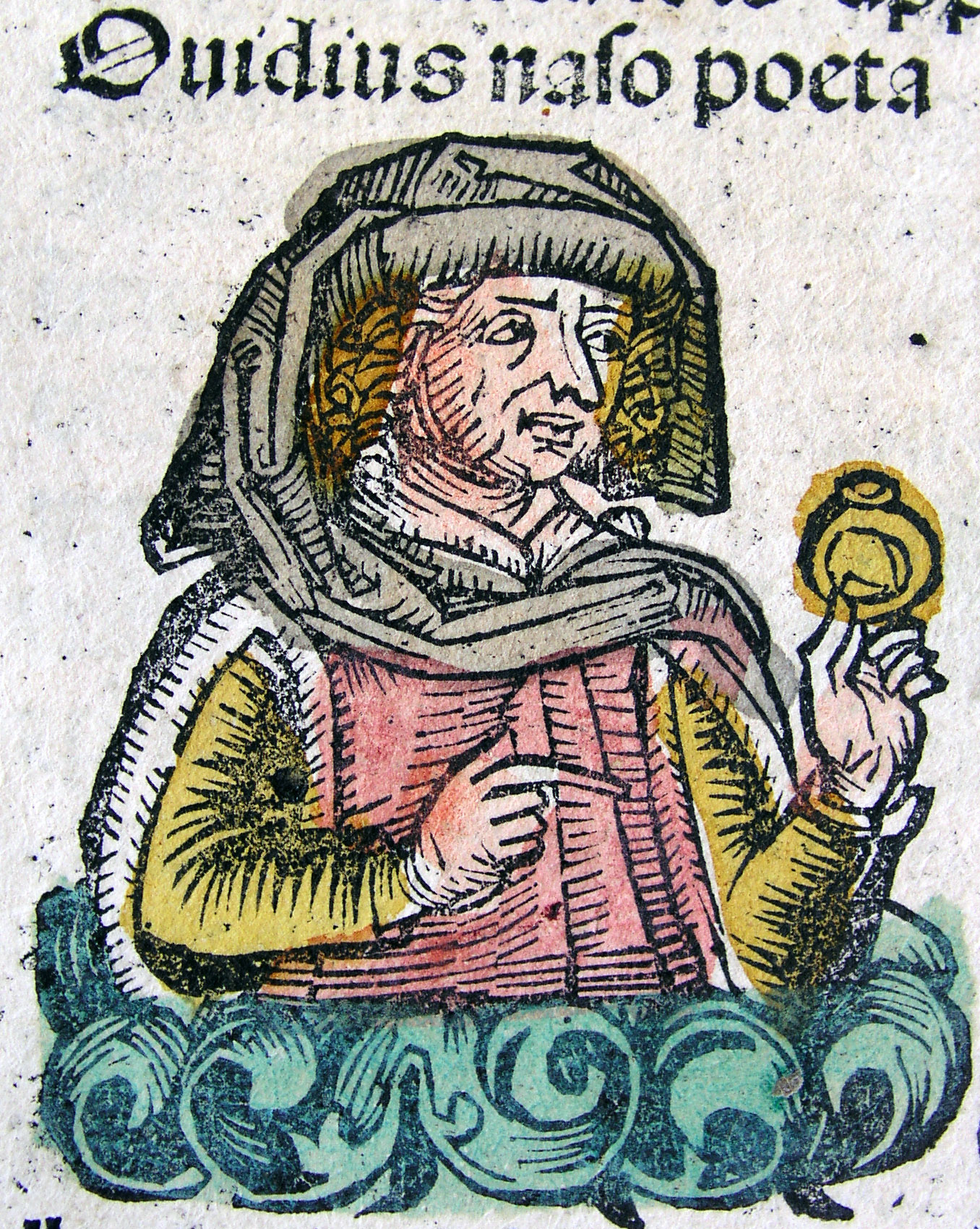
Medieval view of Ovid: An early printed image in the Nuremberg Chronicle

== Influence ==
Roger Bacon took from Book III of De vetula a link between Aristotle and astronomy. He also was influenced by work of the astronomer Abu Ma'shar al-Balkhi as represented in the poem. Another who cited it out of scientific interest was Thomas Bradwardine.

Richard de Bury cites it in his Philobiblon, and Juan Ruiz drew on it for his Libro de buen amor.

== Summary ==
The poem takes the reader through the story of the life of ‘Ovid,’ and how being tricked by a crone changed his outlook on life. In the poem, the central theme all branches off from the attempted rape of a young girl; in order to accomplish this, he asks the old crone, who has ‘witch like power,’ to help him. But, his plan is foiled when the crone discloses herself as a sixteen-year-old virgin, which ultimately disgusted him. By doing so, the old lady not only saved a young girl from being raped, but also took any bragging rights ‘Ovid’ may have gained by having intercourse with the young girl.

However, despite his initial disgust, this would serve as a turning point for the man, prompting a change of heart. Characterized in courtly love literature, a one-sided “romance,” allows for one to grow spiritually, so by becoming a student of the old woman and her natural understanding, as he worked towards his new goal of sapientia, or wisdom.By the end of the third book, ‘Ovid’ had not only studied the life experience of the old woman, but also her knowledge of physiology. In the end, the once disgusting and useless old woman had become, in ‘Ovids’ eyes, the vessel of all knowledge.

== Defining Courtly Love in Rape Culture ==
Courtly love, or "amour courtois,” is the idealized and unattainable definition of true love in the Middle Ages. Through the work of French Troubadours, they shaped the idea of love across Europe through poetry and musical performances. Though their impact was not always positive, as Carissa M. Harris points out, the lyrics “taught rape culture,” which explains the domination and dehumanization of women, and how men can get away with it; prostitution was also culturally accepted, as it served only a small fine if a man was caught, whereas it was detrimental for the woman who had been victimized.

== Crone ==
In her work titled Le Roman de la Rose, Christine de Pizan, an Italian poet, raises a single question: “querelle des femmes?” Simply put, “the woman question” marked an interest in women’s place in society and their capabilities. Compared to men, women have been portrayed in an almost grotesque light in middle-aged literature, referring to them as crones or witches, once they reach middle to late age. When a woman is born, society assigns her three roles: virgin, mother, and death; eventually, she becomes a crone, which, according to the Oxford English Dictionary, is a “withered old woman.” In patriarchal societies, women are simply there for sexual pleasure and childbearing. Once those two things are ‘used up, “they are deemed useless members of society.

== Women’s Influence on Human Anatomy ==
The idea of the weaponization of a woman's body was highlighted by the lack of male knowledge on medicine, whereas women not only retained information which they had gained over their lifetime in the domestic world, but also that which had been passed down from the generations before. In the Ovidian context, a woman’s menstruation was demonized, as the cause for ailments like cancer, leprosy, and fetal deformities. Yet, when she went into menopause, Roger Bacon would cite Ovid on the idea that a woman who has stopped menstruating had two pupils per eye, which could kill a man at a glance. Either way, the woman poses a threat to man, yet only one is labeled a crone. Menstruation's demonization came from the idea that when a woman stopped menstruating, the now ‘useless’ woman would no longer have a way to ‘let out’ the poison which her body produced. With these changes comes what is called the “grandmother hypothesis” [the modern definition of ‘crone wisdom’], which holds that the experience and knowledge of old women are invaluable. With extensive knowledge in obstetrics and gynecology, the period, and everyday illnesses, their scientific knowledge remains important to men, children, and everyone in between. Yet, with the Universities, 14th-century women were pushed out of the field which they had once monopolized, as men had begun using the once dismissed knowledge from the women to further their own University coursework.

== Bibliography ==
- Robathan, Dorothy M,. The Pseudo-Ovidian De Vetula: Text, Introduction, and Notes, 1968.
- Bellhouse, D. R,. "De Vetula: a medieval manuscript containing probability calculations." International Statistical Review 68: 123 – 136, 2000.
- Bellhouse, D. R,. Genest, Christian,. “The Role of Dice in the Emergence of the Probability Calculus.” International Statistical Review. July 25th, 2025. https://onlinelibrary.wiley.com/doi/10.1111/insr.70003
- “French Women & Feminists in History: A Resource Guide,.” Research Guides at Library of Congress. accessed April 5th, 2026. https://guides.loc.gov/feminism-french-women-history.
- Hackett, Jeremiah. “Roger Bacon” in Jeremiah Hackett, "Roger Bacon,." in The Stanford Encyclopedia of Philosophy (Summer 2024 Edition). ed. Edward N. Zalta and Uri Nodelman (Stanford: Stanford University, 2024). https://plato.stanford.edu/archives/sum2024/entries/roger-bacon/.
- Haynes, Justin. “Roger Bacon and the Pseudo-Ovidian De vetula.” The Journal of Medieval Latin. Volume 32, Issue 1, Jan 2022, p. 21 - 63, https://doi.org/10.1484/J.JML.5.131225.
- Hexter, Ralph., Pfuntner, Laura,. and Haynes, Justin,. "On the Old Woman." in Appendix Ovidiana: Latin Poems Ascribed to Ovid in the Middle Ages. Dumbarton Oaks Medieval Library 62, 2020, pp. 134–297
- Jones, Graham A,. Exploring Probability in School: Challenges for Teaching and Learning (2005).
- Paul Klopsch (1967), Pseudo-Ovidius De vetula. Untersuchungen und Text
- Rafid Kabir,. Syed. “Courtly Love: An Idealized and Unattainable Love.” History Cooperative: European History, February 19, 2024. https://historycooperative.org/cou
- Roberts, Jeanne Addison,. “The Crone in English Renaissance Drama.” Medieval & Renaissance Drama in England, 2003. Vol. 15 , p.2-3. Rosemont Publishing & Printing Corp DBA Associated University Presses. https://www.jstor.org/stable/24322658.
- Shafer, Glenn,. "Marie-France Bru and Bernard Bru on Dice Games and Contracts." Statistical Science, 33 (2): 277–284, May 2018. https://www.jstor.org/stable/26770995
- Truitt, E. R,. “How to turn experience into science: The case of the old woman.” postmedieval: a journal of medieval cultural studies (2025). https://doi.org/10.1057/s41280-025-00398-7.
- Vun, Leah De., “Review of Medieval Monstrosity and the Female Body by Sarah Alison Miller." Journal of the History of Sexuality 22, no. 3 : 542-544. https://muse.jhu.edu/article/517495criticized.woman's
