= Conrad Porta =

Conrad Porta (1541–1585) was a Lutheran pastor of Mansfeld, and author of theologian tracts of the first generation following Martin Luther. His most notable work is the Jungfrawen-Spiegel ("Mirror of Virgins", so called after the medieval Speculum Virginum) of 1580 which he wrote on the request of the widowed Margareta von Mansfeld-Hinterort, duchess of Braunschweig-Lüneburg (1534–1596).
