= Accessus ad auctores =

Medieval literary genre

Start of the accessus ad auctores in the Bavarian State Library, MS Clm 19475. The top reads Accessus ouidii ep[isto]lar[um], i.e., "introduction to Ovid's letters".

The accessus ad auctores ('introduction to authors') was a literary genre of the Middle Ages. Originally, an accessus was the introduction at the beginning of a commentary on a classical author, containing background information on the author and his work. Beginning in the 12th century, these accessus (Note: In Latin, accessus is a 4th declension noun, and thus both nominative singular and nominative plural are spelt the same, although the nominative plural form has a long final u. Wheeler also treats accessus as the English plural form.) were excerpted from the commentaries and published in separate collections. It is to these collections that modern scholars give the name accessus ad auctores. Invariably written in Latin, they were designed for the use of students of Latin grammar.

The standard accessus was arranged as a series of questions in the form headings followed by their answers. Four distinct schemes of organization are recognized based on the choice of headings:

- The Servian scheme is based on the prologue to Virgil's Aeneid written by the 4th-century grammarian Servius. It covers seven headings: (1) the life of the poet, (2) the title of the work, (3) its genre, (4) authorial intention, (5) the number of volumes, (6) the order of the volumes and (7) an explanation or interpretation.
- The rhetorical scheme is based on the septem circumstantiae (seven circumstances) of classical rhetoric: (1) who, (2) what, (3) where, (4) by what means, (5) why, (6) how and (7) when. It was favoured, for example, by the 9th-century commentator Remigius of Auxerre.
- The philosophical scheme is based on Boethius' introduction to his own commentary on the Isagoge of Porphyry. It covers six headings: (1) the intention of the work, (2) its utility, (3) its internal order, (4) the name of the author, (5) the title of the work and (6) the branch of philosophy to which it belongs.
- The modern scheme represents a conscious break with those that came before. It was a simplified form of the philosophical scheme and was favoured by 12th-century modernists like Conrad of Hirsau. It used three or four headings: (1) the subject matter, (2) authorial intention, (3) the utility of the work and (4) the branch of philosophy to which it belongs. Utility was sometimes dropped.

Conrad of Hirsau's discussion of method in his Dialogus super auctores is "the only theoretical discussion of the technique of the accessus that has come down to us from medieval times". He indicates that the accessus was by then a well established and autonomous genre, intended for both pagan and Christian works in prose and verse, and used at the very beginning of a pupil's education. His own selection of authors consists of Aesop (actually the versifier Phaedrus), Avianus, Boethius, Cato, Cicero, Donatus, Homer, Juvenal, Lucan, Ovid, Persius, Prosper, Prudentius, Sallust, Sedulius, Statius, Virgil and Theodulus. Ovid was so popular an author that different accessus for him were often anthologized as an accessus Ouidianus.
