= Speculum Virginum =

Medieval theological encyclopedia

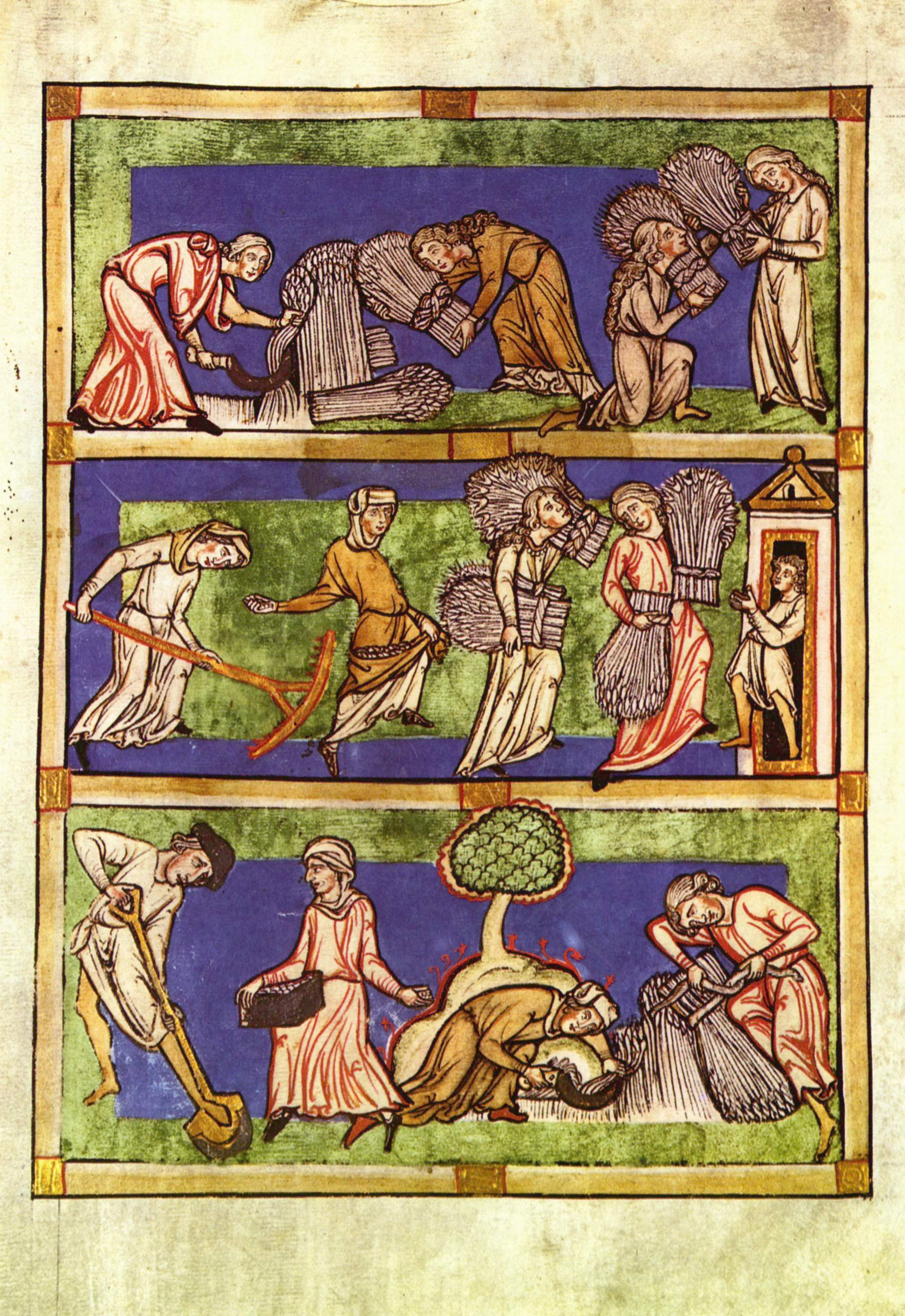
Illustration of a "harvest" allegory, from a 13th-century manuscript. The "Three Conditions of Woman": the virgins who dedicated themselves to Christ are shown as harvesting "hundredfold", the pious widows harvest "sixty-fold", and the pious married wives harvest "thirty-fold".

The Speculum Virginum (Latin for "Mirror of Virgins"; German: Jungfrauenspiegel) is a 12th-century didactic treatise on female monastic life. The original text dates to the mid-12th century. The author's identity is uncertain. One theory holds it was written by the Benedictine monk Conrad of Hirsau. Another possibility is that it was composed at the Augustinian Abbey of Andernach, founded by Richard, abbot of Springiersbach, for his sister in 1128. Richard appointed a priest, one Conrad, as spiritual advisor to his sister, and some scholars have suggested this Conrad as the text's author.

The work provides one of the earliest comprehensive theologies of cloistered religious life. It mainly consists of a hypothetical dialogue between Peregrinus, a male religious teacher, and Theodora, a female disciple. The dialogue seeks to strengthen the determination and resolve of Theodora (and hence by example, other readers) to live life as a virgin dedicated to God.

The growth of the various manuscripts of the Speculum Virginum in the Middle Ages had a particular resonance for women who sought a dedicated religious life. While impacting the development of female monastic life, it also influenced the proliferation of male monastic orders, and even Protestant theology via the writings of Nikolaus Selnecker and Conrad Porta.

The text was widely read from the 12th century until the Reformation, and it survives in 26 vernacular (Middle Low German) and in 30 Latin recensions. The Latin text was edited with a German translation by Seyfarth (1990). Most surviving manuscripts date to the 15th century. An early version of the Latin text is preserved in Cologne W276a (ca. 1140), possibly originating from Andernach, and in BL Arundel MS 44.
