= Tessera lusoria =

Roman game token

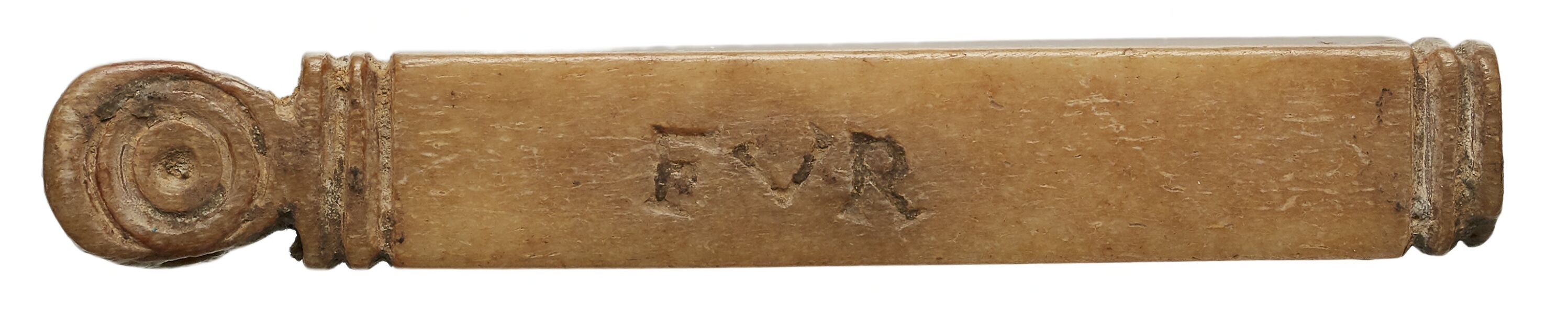

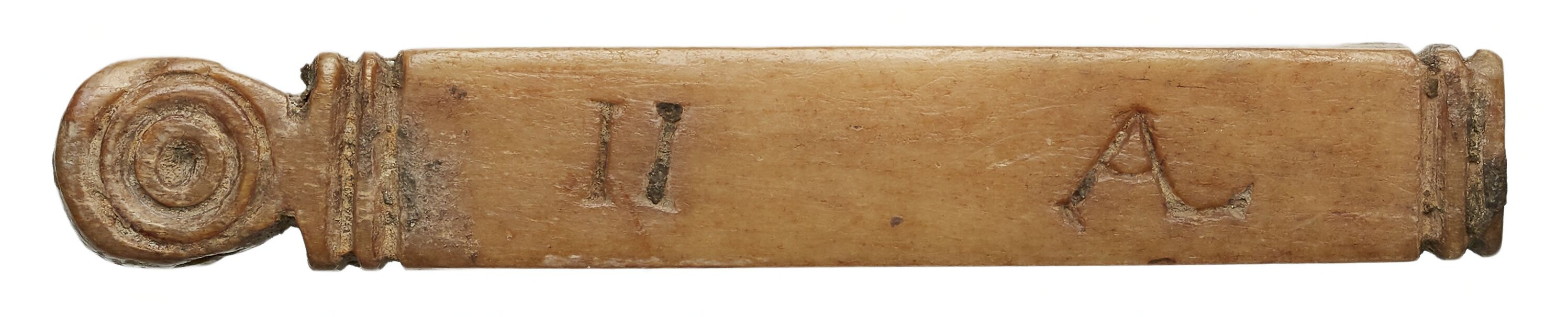
A tessera lusoria inscribed FVR (thief) and II AL (2 AL)

The term tessera lusoria (plural: tesserae lusoriae), is a modern archaeological name coined by Christian Hülsen in 1896, to denote a collection of tokens made of flattened bone or ivory and characterized by a parallelepiped shape. Tesserae lusoriae date to the Republican period. The production process involved shaping, filing, and engraving bone from a bovine limb, resulting in moldings at the ends of the tokens. Many examples of tesserae lusoriae have a rounded part decorated with concentric circles; a hole was often drilled through the circular part to allow a string to be placed through the hole, tying the tokens together and allowing them to be carried as a set.

About 240 tesserae lusoriae have been identified in the archaeological record. Tesserae lusoriae from throughout the Roman Republic display slight differences in ornamentation, inscription, and numbering; these discrepancies indicate that the tokens were made from separate, regional workshops. It has been suggested that these tokens were manufactured in Italy and imported to distant regions, with several tesserae lusoriae in Spain found near the coast, which might have travelled together with military troops.

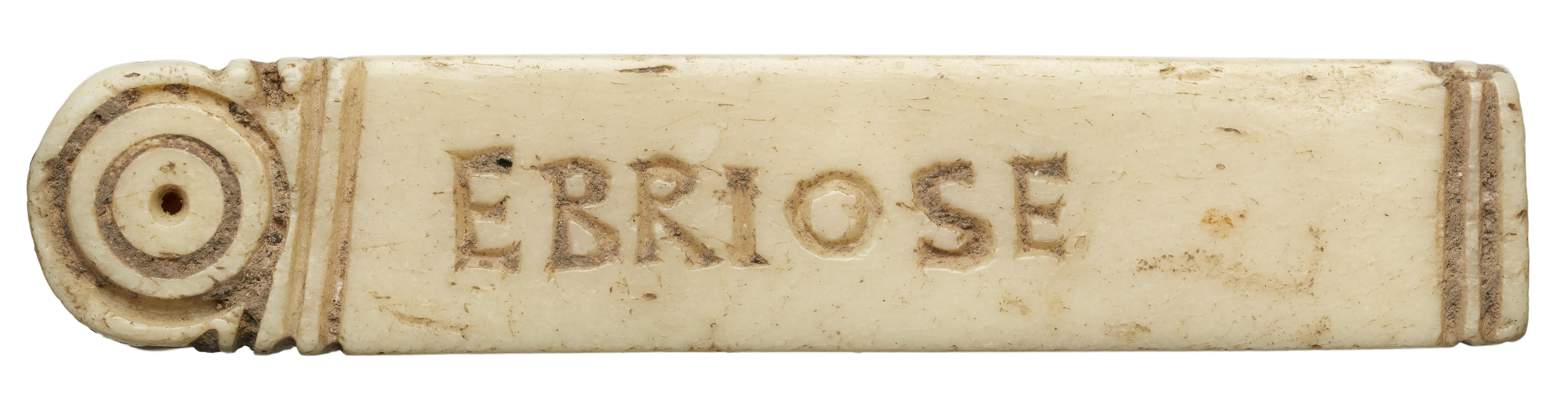
Tessera lusoria inscribed with the word "ebriose," meaning "drunkard."

With a few exceptions, tesserae typically feature an inscription with a word, often an adjective, and a numeral on the opposite side. In some examples, the numeral is sometimes accompanied by either exclusively the letter "A" or an "A" alongside a lambda. These unique markings possibly signify a separate type of token from more standard pieces, with the lambda potentially serving as a modifier. Suggestions link low-numbered tokens to derogatory expressions such as "gulo" or "piger," meaning "glutton" and "dull person" respectively, and high-numbered ones to more positive traits such as "benignus" or "felix," meaning "kind" or "lucky" respectively. Certain numbers may also have correlated to specific types of negative characteristics; multiple, separate tokens inscribed with the numeral "4" all utilize words referencing the idea of gluttony. The word "gulo" appears on tokens from Gabii and Perugia, the word "ebriose" (meaning "drunk") appears on different token, and another example contains the word "vapio" (possibly related to the word "vappa," meaning flat wine or a worthless person). The more profane phrases are typically written in the vocative case, while the more positive traits are typically expressed in the nominative. Some tesserae lusoriae contain verbs in their inscriptions: one token reads "vix rides," meaning "you're almost laughing" or "you're finally laughing." If the token is flipped word side-up along the long edge, then the number always appears on the right side.

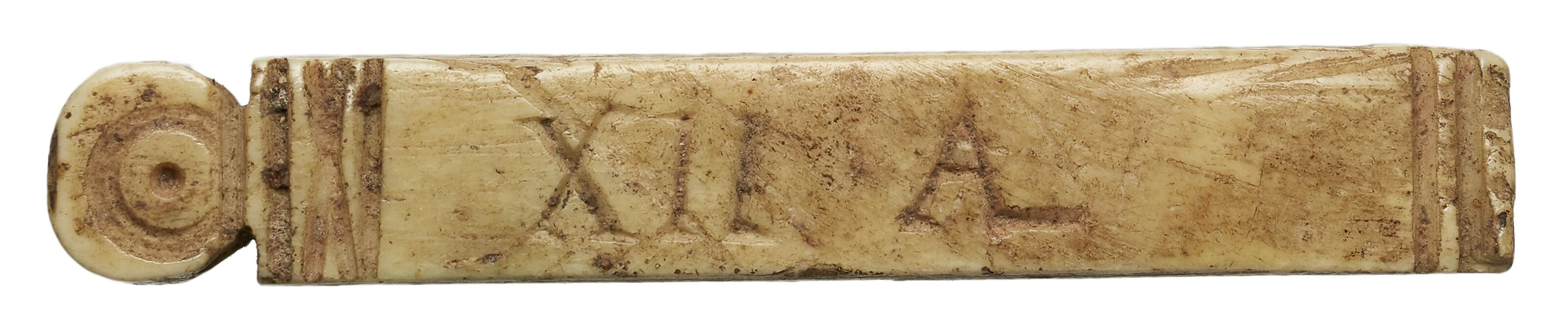
Example of tesserae lusoriae with the letter "A"

In 1887, Italian historian Gian Francesco Gamurrini hypothesized that the connections between phrases and numbers indicated that the tokens were used in Roman games. Gamurrini suggested that the tokens may have been involved in the Roman game of Duodecim Scripta; however, the game was only played with 15 pieces, and the numerals on tesserae lusoriae can reach up to 70. Another theory posited by Gamurrini is that the tesserae lusoriae may have been involved in a currently unknown Roman game. German historian Christian Hülsen argued that the tokens may have been involved in the game of ludus latrunculi, although references to colored latrunculi pieces in Roman literature contradict this notion. Despite ongoing scholarly debates, the purpose and rules of the game remain unclear. Inconsistencies between the descriptions of games in Roman literature and the tesserae lusoriae could possibly be explained by changing rules over time.

In 1935, the scholar Roland Austin rejected the idea that tesserae lusoriae were Roman gaming tokens, arguing that their rectangular shape made them unlike all other known Roman gaming pieces, which were circular. Giulia Baratta argued that instead of being used as pieces in games, the tesserae lusoriae functioned as tickets in a tombola or lottery system..
