= Bernard of Utrecht =

Bernard of Utrecht (also Bernard d'Utrecht, Latinised Bernardus Ultrajectensis) was a cleric of the late eleventh century, known for an allegorical commentary on the Eclogue of Theodulus, a standard Latin school text. According to its modern editor R. B. C. Huyghens, in it "students of the history of medicine will find the earliest mention of autopsy, philosophers the oldest quotation from the "Florentina," the Latin version of Aristotle's "Analytica priora" (for which until recently Abélard and John of Salisbury were the oldest references), and historians the oldest version of the malicious story of the pact between the devil and pope Sylvester II."
