= Conrad of Hirsau =

German Benedictine monk and writer

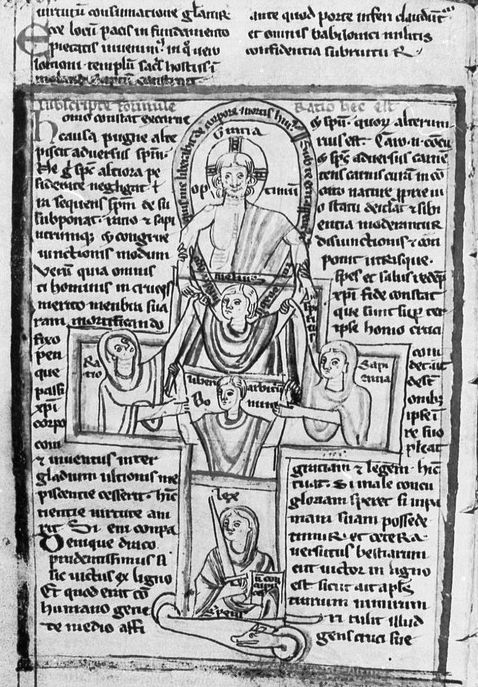

Conrad of Hirsau or Hirschau (Latin: Conradus Hirsaugiensis; c. 1070 – c. 1150) was a German Benedictine monk and writer at the Hirsau Abbey. He is known for his literary work Dialogus super auctores, an accessus ad auctores written about 1130. Conrad identified himself as a "modern" in literary terms. His Dialogus is "the only theoretical discussion of the technique of the accessus [ad auctores] that has come down to us from medieval times". His own selection of authors consists of Aesop (actually the versifier Phaedrus), Avianus, Boethius, Cato, Cicero, Donatus, Homer, Juvenal, Lucan, Ovid, Persius, Prosper, Prudentius, Sallust, Sedulius, Statius, Virgil and Theodulus.

Conrad has also been suggested as the author of the ascetical works, the Speculum virginum, De fructibus carnis et spiritus, Dialogus de mundi contemptu vel amore, and Allocutio ad Deum.
