= Dice tower =

Device to randomize dice rolls

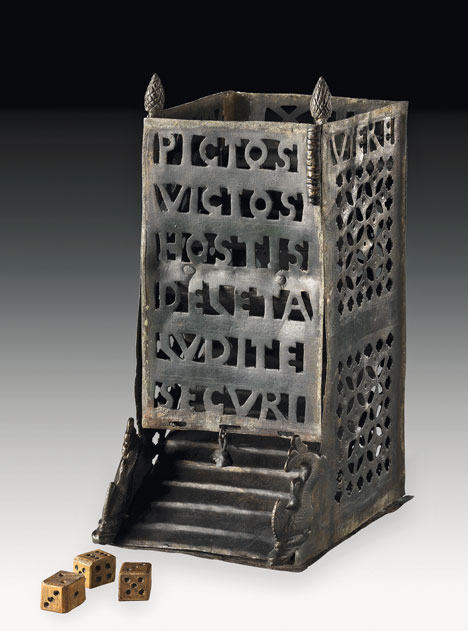
The Vettweiss-Froitzheim Dice Tower dates from the 4th century AD

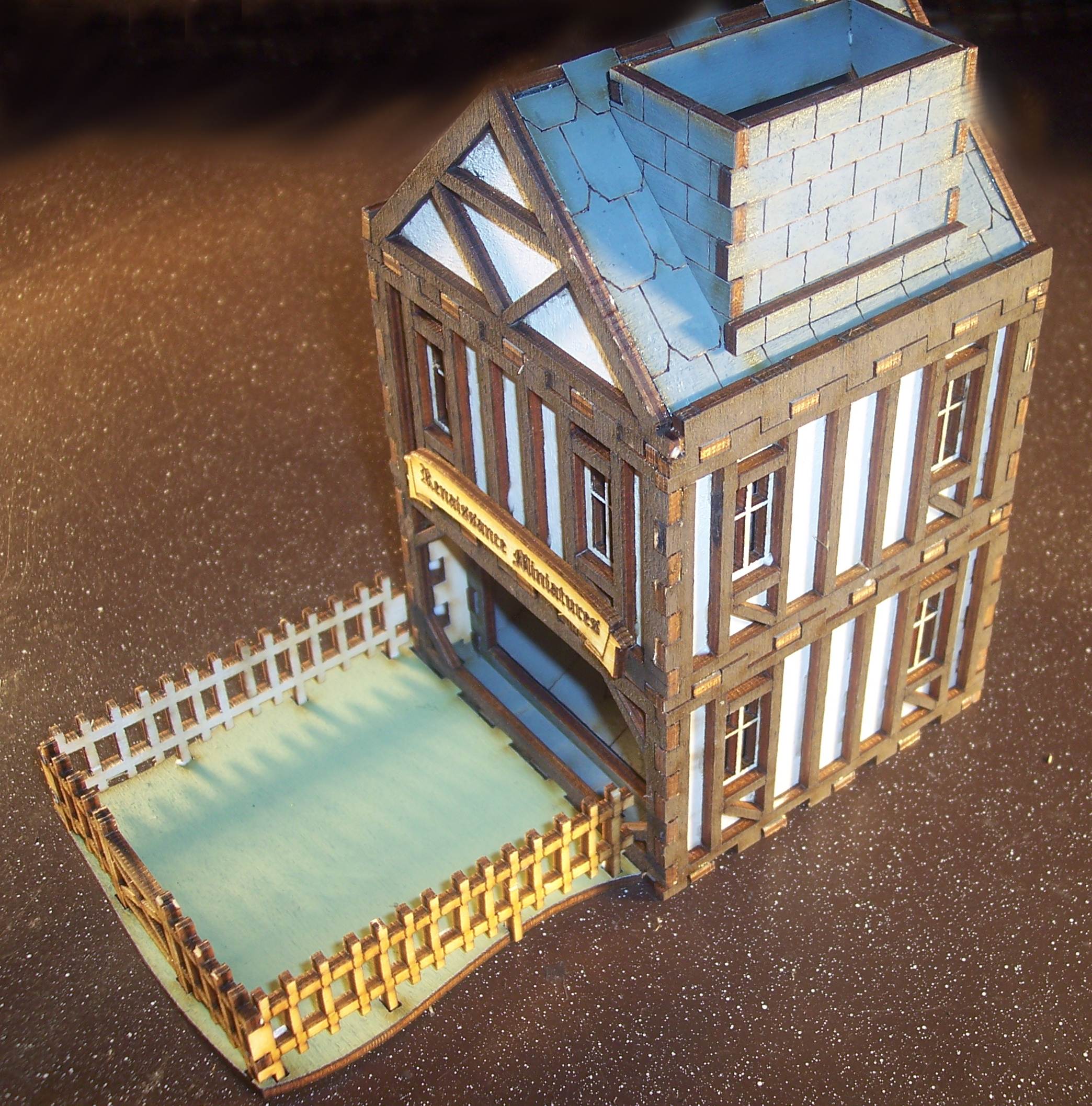
A dice tower, made to look like a medieval house in 28mm scale

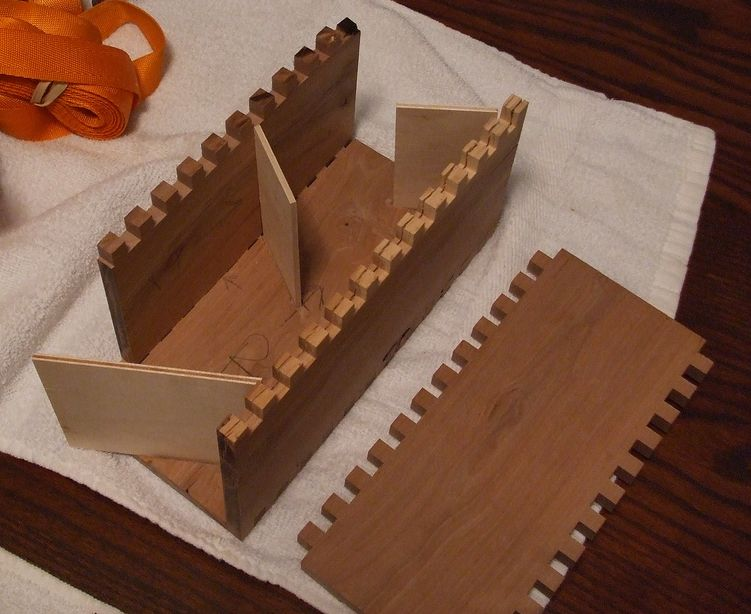
Interior of a dice tower showing ramps intended to cause tumbling as dice fall through the tower

A dice tower (Latin turricula lit. 'small tower') is a tool used by gamers to roll dice fairly. Dice are dropped into the top of the tower, and bounce off various hidden platforms inside it before emerging from the front. Dice towers eliminate some methods of cheating which may be performed when rolling dice by hand. There are many forms of towers and they vary in construction and design.

== History ==
Dice towers have been used since at least the fourth century, in an attempt to ensure that dice roll outcomes were random. The Vettweiss-Froitzheim Dice Tower is a surviving example, used by Romans in Germany; it has essentially the same design as modern examples, with internal baffles to force the dice to rotate more randomly.

== Construction ==
Dice towers can be constructed fairly easily. The main elements of a dice tower include:

- the tower itself, a hollow, vertical rectangular prism with projections along the side (often called "baffles") to sufficiently tumble the dice to achieve a random result
- a ramp at the bottom which spills the dice from the inside of the tower
- a small tray, into which the dice come to rest, usually bordered by a short lip to prevent the dice from exiting and disrupting the game or going astray

== Usage ==
The dice are dropped into the top of the tower and bounce off several interior ramps before emerging from an opening at the base of the tower. Some dice towers include a walled-off area for the dice to land in so that they are not scattered across the table. Players who find hand-rolling dice difficult may also utilize dice towers.

In tournament backgammon, a dice tower, often referred to as a dice tumbler, is commonly used to ensure fairness by reducing the possibility of a player's intentional influence on the roll.

In tabletop role-playing games, a dice tower may have the additional purpose of allowing the players to roll dice, while only the gamemaster can see the result of the roll. This is sometimes called a "blind roll" and is useful in cases where a player character must make a dice roll for an action, without knowing whether they succeed or not. A blind roll can be facilitated by positioning the dice tower in such a way that players can drop the dice into the tower, but the dice landing area is hidden from view, for example behind a GM screen.
