= Vettweiss-Froitzheim Dice Tower =

Roman gaming artefact from the 4th century

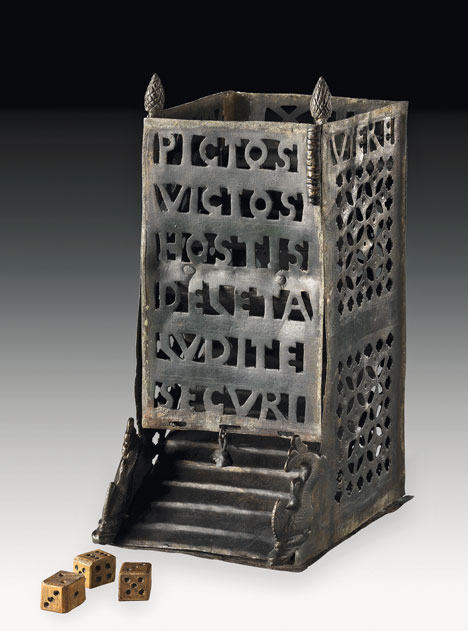
The Vettweiss-Froitzheim Dice Tower. (Rheinisches Landesmuseum)

The Vettweiss-Froitzheim Dice Tower is a Roman artifact, a dice tower (Turricula i.e. "small tower" in Latin) formerly used in the playing of dice games. It was intended to produce a trustworthy throw of one or more dice. It was discovered in 1985 in Germany. It is preserved in the Rheinisches Landesmuseum of Bonn.

The tower dates to the fourth century AD and was apparently presented as a gift. It bears two Latin texts. The longer text commemorates a military defeat of the Picts. The shorter text wishes good luck to the unnamed recipients of the item.

It is the earliest surviving artefact to mention the Picts.

== Discovery ==
The dice tower was discovered in 1985 near the modern villages of Vettweiss and Froitzheim. During the Roman era this location was in the province of Germania Inferior on the Imperial frontier with Germania. This was the site of a villa in the German state of North Rhine-Westphalia. The major military centre of Cologne was located nearby.

== Description ==
It is an upright, hollow cuboid of copper-alloy plate designed to sit level on a flat surface. The top of the dice tower is open, allowing for the introduction of dice, and it contains three levels of projecting baffles which would produce random motion in the dice as they fell through the tower.

The dice would then emerge at the base of the tower via a miniature flight of steps. The dice, while emerging, would ring three bells which formerly hung above the exit. One of these bells survives intact.

The tower is decorated on all faces with pierced patterns and two short texts, written in a grammatically irregular form of Latin, are displayed prominently.

The front face of the tower bears the words:

PICTOS VICTOS HOSTIS DELETA LVDITE SECVRI

This may be read as "The Picts are defeated, the enemies destroyed, play with confidence."

Around the top of the three remaining faces is the phrase:

UTERE FELIX VIVAS which translates to:

"Have a happy life"
