= Johann Friedrich Nolte =

German schoolmaster, theologian and philologist

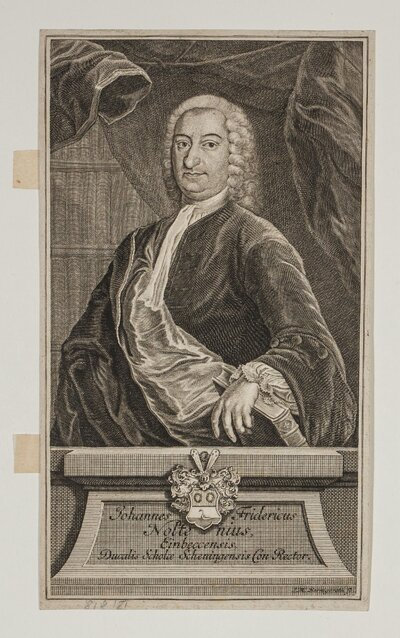
Engraving of Nolte by Christian Benjamin Glassbach

Johann Friedrich Nolte (15 July 1694 – 12 June 1754) was a German schoolmaster, theologian and philologist.

Born in Einbeck in the Principality of Grubenhagen, Nolte was educated in Schöningen, where his father, Paul Martin Nolte, was conrector. In 1711, he went to the Martineum Gymnasium in Braunschweig. In 1712, he went to live with Georg Nitsch while attending the Ernestine Gymnasium. In 1713, he transferred to the Joachimsthal Gymnasium in Berlin. In 1714, he enrolled in theology at the University of Helmstedt.

Nolte was recognized by contemporaries as an excellent debater and preacher. In 1716, he published the theological Animadversiones exegeticae. He also wrote poetry. After his father's death, Duke Augustus William appointed him conrector of the Schöningen gymnasium in January 1717. He held the post until February 1747, when he was promoted to rector. His health soon declined and he died in office. His posthumous reputation rests largely on his philological work, especially the Lexicon linguae latinae Antibarbarum of 1730.
