= Eclogue of Theodulus =

Literary work

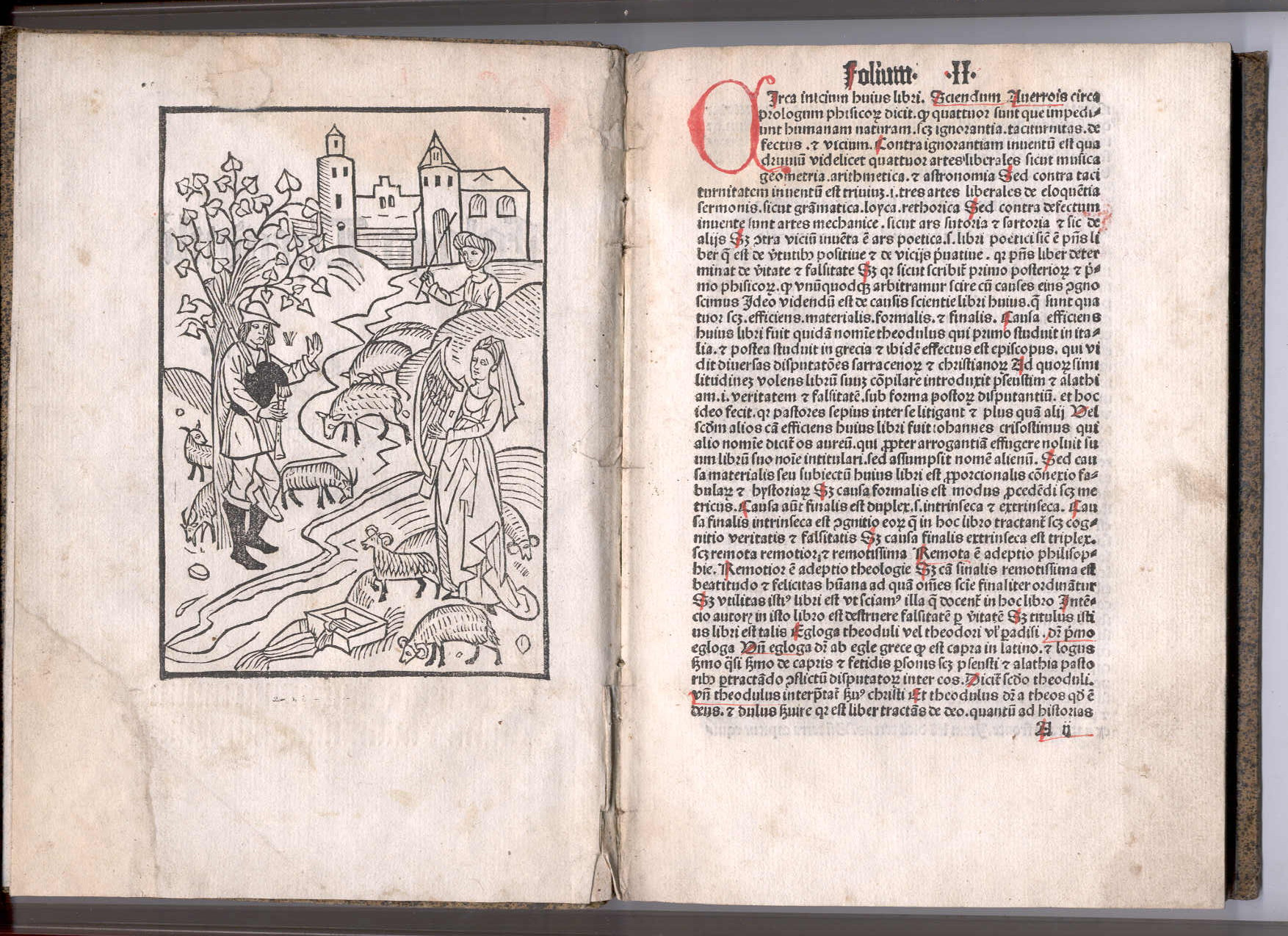
Edition by Konrad Kachelofen (Leipzig, 1492)

The Eclogue of Theodulus (Ecloga Theoduli) was a Latin verse dialogue, which became a standard school text of the Middle Ages. Scholarship generally dates it to the 10th century, though earlier dates are also given.

The first known Medieval commentator to attribute the work to an Athenian educated writer named "Theodulus" was Bernard of Utrecht, but today, most scholars agree that Theodulus is a pseudonym, and the author was not educated in Athens, but lived in the West. This is supported by the fact that all sources for the Eclogue are written in Latin. Earlier theories identified Theodulus with Gottschalk of Orbais because both names mean "servant of God", and because Gottschalk is believed to have known some Greek and the use of Greek names in the dialogue, but in 1924 this was disputed by Karl Strecker. Strecker showed the writing style (poetic meter) of Theodulus was different.

The poem is an argument between Alithia (truth) and Pseustis (falsehood), with Phronesis (reason), acting as referee.
