= Dumbarton Oaks Medieval Library =

Academic book series

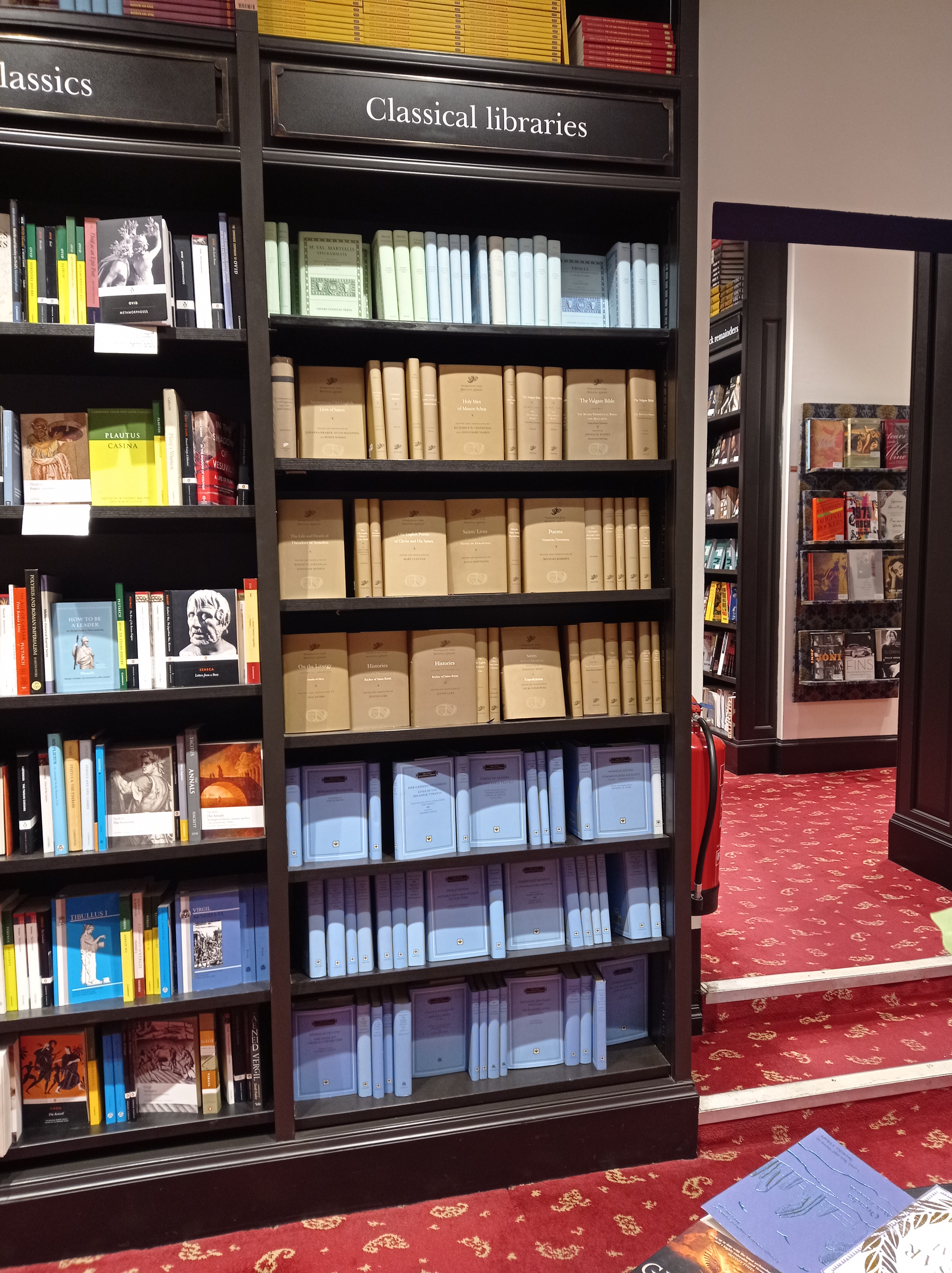
Dumbarton Oaks volumes in a London bookshop

The Dumbarton Oaks Medieval Library (est. 2010) is a series of books published by Harvard University Press in collaboration with the Dumbarton Oaks Research Library and Collection. It presents editions of texts originally written in medieval Latin, Byzantine Greek, Old English, and the languages of the medieval Iberian Peninsula, with facing-page translations into modern English. The aim is to make such texts accessible to English-speaking scholars and general readers.

The general editor is Daniel Donoghue. The language editors are Daniel Donoghue (Old English), Danuta Shanzer (Medieval Latin), Alice-Mary Talbot (Byzantine Greek, 2010–2019), Alexander Alexakis and Richard Greenfield (Byzantine Greek coeditors, 2019 to the present), and Josiah Blackmore (Medieval Iberian). The founding editor of the series was Jan M. Ziolkowski; he served as general editor from 2010 to 2020.

The series is a sister of three others published by Harvard University Press: Loeb Classical Library, I Tatti Renaissance Library, and Murty Classical Library of India.

== Volumes ==
Volume	Title	Language
94	The Blickling Homilies	Old English
93	The Old English Catholic Homilies, The Second Series: Ælfric	Old English
92	The Book of Miracles of Saint Louis, Bishop of Toulouse	Medieval Latin
91	The Old English Chronicle, Volume I: The A-Text to 1001 and Related Poems	Old English
90	The Works of Hrotsvit of Gandersheim	Medieval Latin
89	The Menologion of Basil II	Byzantine Greek
88	The Labyrinth of Fortune: Juan de Mena	Medieval Castilian
87	The Art of Making Verses: Gervase of Melkley	Medieval Latin
86	The Old English Catholic Homilies, The First Series: Ælfric	Old English
85	The Life of Saint Peter of Atroa: Sabas	Byzantine Greek
84	The Iberian Apollonius of Tyre	Medieval Castilian
83	Songs about Women: Romanos the Melodist	Byzantine Greek
82	The Moralized Ovid: Pierre Bersuire	Medieval Latin
81	Medical Writings from Early Medieval England, Volume I: The Old English Herbal, Lacnunga, and Other Texts	Old English
80	Jewel of the Soul, Volume II: Honorius Augustodunensis	Medieval Latin
79	Jewel of the Soul, Volume I: Honorius Augustodunensis	Medieval Latin
78	Saints at the Limits: Seven Byzantine Popular Legends	Byzantine Greek
77	Life of the Virgin Mary: John Geometres	Byzantine Greek
76	Augustine’s Soliloquies in Old English and in Latin	Old English and Medieval Latin
75	Miracles of the Virgin; Tract on Abuses: Nigel of Canterbury	Medieval Latin
74	Biblical and Pastoral Poetry: Alcimus Avitus	Medieval Latin
73	Animal Fables of the Courtly Mediterranean: The Eugenian Recension of Stephanites and Ichnelates	Byzantine Greek
72	The Old English Pastoral Care	Old English
71	Writings on Body and Soul: Aelred of Rievaulx	Medieval Latin
70	The Life and Death of Theodore of Stoudios	Byzantine Greek
69	The Old English and Anglo-Latin Riddle Tradition	Old English, Medieval Latin, and Old Norse
68	Fortune and Misfortune at Saint Gall: Casus sancti Galli, Ekkehard IV	Medieval Latin
67	The Byzantine Sinbad: Michael Andreopoulos	Byzantine Greek
66	Old English Legal Writings: Wulfstan	Old English
65	Parisiana poetria: John of Garland	Medieval Latin
64	Homilies: Sophronios of Jerusalem	Byzantine Greek
63	Anonymous Old English Lives of Saints	Old English
62	Appendix Ovidiana: Latin Poems Ascribed to Ovid in the Middle Ages	Medieval Latin
61	On Morals or Concerning Education: Theodore Metochites	Byzantine Greek
60	Old English Lives of Saints, Volume III: Ælfric	Old English
59	Old English Lives of Saints, Volume II: Ælfric	Old English
58	Old English Lives of Saints, Volume I: Ælfric	Old English
57	The History of the Kings of Britain: The First Variant Version	Medieval Latin
56	Allegories of the Odyssey: John Tzetzes	Byzantine Greek
55	Architrenius: Johannes de Hauvilla	Medieval Latin
54	Saints of Ninth- and Tenth-Century Greece	Byzantine Greek
53	Tria sunt: An Art of Poetry and Prose	Medieval Latin
52	Two Works on Trebizond: Michael Panaretos, Bessarion	Byzantine Greek
51	Medieval Latin Lives of Muhammad	Medieval Latin
50	The Poems of Christopher of Mytilene and John Mauropous	Byzantine Greek
49	Carmina Burana: Volume II	Medieval Latin
48	Carmina Burana: Volume I	Medieval Latin
47	The Life of Saint Neilos of Rossano	Byzantine Greek
46	Poems: Venantius Fortunatus	Medieval Latin
45	Christian Novels from the Menologion of Symeon Metaphrastes	Byzantine Greek
44	The Old English History of the World: An Anglo-Saxon Rewriting of Orosius	Old English
43	The Rhetorical Exercises of Nikephoros Basilakes	Byzantine Greek
42	Old English Psalms	Old English
41	On Plato's Timaeus: Calcidius	Medieval Latin
40	Holy Men of Mount Athos	Byzantine Greek
39	Lives and Miracles: Gregory of Tours	Medieval Latin
38	Poetic Works: Bernardus Silvestris	Medieval Latin
37	Allegories of the Iliad: John Tzetzes	Byzantine Greek
36	On the Liturgy, Volume II: Books 3–4, Amalar of Metz	Medieval Latin
35	On the Liturgy, Volume I: Books 1–2, Amalar of Metz	Medieval Latin
34	The Histories, Volume II: Books 6–10, Laonikos Chalkokondyles	Byzantine Greek
33	The Histories, Volume I: Books 1–5, Laonikos Chalkokondyles	Byzantine Greek
32	Old English Shorter Poems, Volume II: Wisdom and Lyric	Old English
31	Saints’ Lives, Volume II: Henry of Avranches	Medieval Latin
30	Saints’ Lives, Volume I: Henry of Avranches	Medieval Latin
29	On Difficulties in the Church Fathers: The Ambigua, by Maximos the Confessor, Volume II	Byzantine Greek
28	On Difficulties in the Church Fathers: The Ambigua, by Maximos the Confessor, Volume I	Byzantine Greek
27	Old English Poems of Christ and His Saints	Old English
26	Ysengrimus	Medieval Latin
25	The Well-Laden Ship: Egbert of Liège	Medieval Latin
24	Accounts of Medieval Constantinople: The Patria	Byzantine Greek
23	The Old English Poems of Cynewulf	Old English
22	Literary Works: Alan of Lille	Medieval Latin
21	The Vulgate Bible, Volume VI: The New Testament	Medieval Latin
20	The Life of Saint Symeon the New Theologian: Niketas Stethatos	Byzantine Greek
19	The Old English Boethius	Old English
18	One Hundred Latin Hymns	Medieval Latin
17	The Vulgate Bible, Volume V: The Minor Prophetical Books and Maccabees	Medieval Latin
16	The History: Michael Attaleiates	Byzantine Greek
15	Old English Shorter Poems, Volume I: Religious and Didactic	Old English
14	Apocalypse: Pseudo-Methodius. An Alexandrian World Chronicle	Medieval Latin
13	The Vulgate Bible, Volume IV: The Major Prophetical Books	Medieval Latin
12	Miracle Tales from Byzantium	Byzantine Greek
11	Histories, Volume II: Books 3–4, Richer of Saint-Rémi	Medieval Latin
10	Histories, Volume I: Books 1–2, Richer of Saint-Rémi	Medieval Latin
9	Satires: Sextus Amarcius. Eupolemius	Medieval Latin
8	The Vulgate Bible, Volume III: The Poetical Books	Medieval Latin
7	Old Testament Narratives	Old English
6	The Rule of Saint Benedict	Medieval Latin
5	The Vulgate Bible, Volume II, Part B: The Historical Books	Medieval Latin
4	The Vulgate Bible, Volume II, Part A: The Historical Books	Medieval Latin
3	The Beowulf Manuscript	Old English
2	The Arundel Lyrics. The Poems of Hugh Primas	Medieval Latin
1	The Vulgate Bible, Volume I: The Pentateuch	Medieval Latin
