= Geoffrey of Vinsauf =

13th-century English linguist and grammarian

Geoffrey of Vinsauf (fl. 1200) is a representative of the early medieval grammarian movement, termed preceptive grammar for its interest in teaching the ars poetica.

Ars poetria is a subdivision of the grammatical art (ars grammatica) which synthesizes "rhetorical" and "grammatical" elements. The line of demarcation between these two fields is not firmly established in the Middle Ages. Gallo explains that "both of these liberal arts taught composition and taught the student to examine the diction, figurative language, and meters of the curriculum authors who were to serve as models for imitation. However it was rhetoric and not grammar that was concerned with Invention of subject matter and with disposition or organization of the work" as well as memory and delivery.

Murphy explains that the medieval artes poetriae are divided into two types. First, there is the short, specialized type of treatise dealing with figurae, colores, tropi, and other verbal ornaments. They appeared separately all over Europe, usually anonymous, and were incorporated in elementary schooling, as adjuncts to ordinary grammar instruction. The second type of ars poetriae includes such works as the Ars versificatoria (c. 1175) of Matthew of Vendôme, the Laborintus (after 1213, before 1280) of Eberhard the German, the Ars versificaria (c. 1215) of Gervase of Melkley, the Poetria nova (1208–1213) and the Documentum de modo et arte dictandi et versificandi (after 1213) of Geoffrey of Vinsauf, and the De arte prosayca, metrica, et rithmica (after 1229) of John of Garland. The artes poetriae constituted poetry as an academic discipline, and promoted its participation in the methods of logic.

== Biography ==
Very little is known about the life of Geoffrey of Vinsauf. From his Poetria nova, it is known that he was at one time in England before going to Rome during the pontificate of Innocent III, to whom the Poetria nova was prepared as a special gift. The traditional account of Geoffrey of Vinsauf provides further details of his biography: he is believed to be born in Normandy. It is sometimes claimed that he was then educated at St Frideswide's Priory. He is said to have returned to the Continent for further university study, first in Paris and later in Italy. He incurred the displeasure of Bishop Adam, allegedly after a quarrel in Paris with a certain Robert, once his friend, and was forced to appeal to the mercy of the Archbishop of Canterbury. Later, perhaps through the intercession of that prelate, he journeyed back to England to become tutor at Hampton. At a still later date he is said to have been sent on an embassy to Innocent III, and thus to have developed relations with the Holy See. His designation as "Vinsauf", or "de Vino Salvo", is traceable to a treatise attributed to him on the keeping of the vine and other plants.

== Works and Bibliography ==
The Poetria nova is a 2,000-line poem written around 1210 in Latin hexameters and dedicated to Pope Innocent III. The Poetria nova aimed to replace the standard text on verse composition, Horace's Ars Poetica called the Poetria in the Middle Ages, which was widely read and commented upon in the eleventh and twelfth centuries. Karsten Friis-Jensen suggests that Geoffrey of Vinsauf's "main incentive for writing independent arts of poetry was probably a wish to systematize the exegetical material which generations of commentators had collected around Horace's text, in a structure that was in better accordance with traditional didactics in the closely related art of rhetoric" (364). The medieval teacher intended to reshape the Ars Poetica into an elementary textbook on composing poetry, "modeled on the Ciceronian rhetorics and their medieval derivatives, such as the artes dictandi and the treatises on the colores rhetorici". The Poetria nova almost immediately became one of the standard textbooks in England and was incorporated into the curriculum on the Continent very soon thereafter. To its popularity testifies the number of manuscripts (200) in which this work is found and extensive commentary, which takes form of marginal glosses around a text of the Poetria nova and a text copied separately by itself.

Documentum de modo et arte dictandi et versificandi (Instruction in the Method and Art of Speaking and Versifying) written after 1213 is a prose counterpart of the Poetria nova which expands on amplification, abbreviation, and verbal ornamentation. It is preserved complete in three manuscripts and nearly complete in another two manuscripts. The thirteenth-century copies explicitly attribute the treatise to "magistri Galfridi" or "magistri Galfridi le Vin est sauf". Two other works are attributed to him: Summa de Coloribus Rhetoricis (A Summary of the Colors of Rhetoric), a briefer work, primarily on figures of speech, and the "Causa Magistri Gaufredi Vinesauf" ("The Apology of Master Geoffrey of Vinsauf"), a short poem of topical and political interest. He used to be regarded as the author of Itinerarium Regis Ricardi, a narrative of the Third Crusade, but this is certainly false.

Edmond Faral edited the texts of the Poetria nova, Documentum de modo et arte dictandi et versificandi, and Summa de coloribus rhetoricis. The Poetria nova has been translated into English three times. Documentum de modo et arte dictandi et versificandi is translated by Roger Parr. In this article, quotations are from Kopp's translation.

== The Poetria nova ==
The Poetria nova is a preceptive treatise, that is, it gives a specific advice to future writers about the composition of poetry. Its handbook genre is reinforced by multiple illustrations of its precepts entirely invented by Geoffrey of Vinsauf, rather than culled from classical authors. The text itself serves as an illustration of techniques it teaches. Thus, the treatment of amplification is amplified, the treatment of abbreviation is abbreviated, metaphor is discussed in figurative language. As Woods notes, the applicability of the instructions of Poetria nova to both verse and prose and the various ways it could be used in the classroom, combined with the range of styles that Geoffrey of Vinsauf used to illustrate techniques, made it the general all-purpose medieval rhetorical treatise par excellence.

A thirteenth century anonymous commentary on the Poetria nova notes the twofold nature of this book: first, the five parts of the book are the five parts of rhetoric: Invention, disposition, style, memory, and delivery; second, the Poetria nova is itself a rhetorical discourse with the necessary parts: exordium, narratio, divisio, confutatio, and conclusio. Its author is, consequently, an accomplished theoretician, orator, and "a good teacher".

The Poetria nova incorporates Ciceronian precept on invention and arrangement, Horatian doctrine on decorum, and instructions on style including the tropes, figures of words and figures of thought derived from the pseudo-Ciceronian Rhetorica ad Herennium. Gallo summarizes the major topics of the Poetria nova as follows (numbers in parentheses refer to line numbers of the original Latin verse), following the dedication, a panegyric to Pope Innocent III:

1. Introduction; Divisions of the art of rhetoric (verses 1-86).
2. Arrangement, including the natural and artificial openings (vv. 87-202).
3. Amplification and Abbreviation (vv. 203-741).
4. Stylistic ornament (vv. 742-1592).
5. Conversion (vv. 1593-1765).
6. Determination (vv. 1766-1846).
7. Miscellaneous advice on choice of words, humor, faults to avoid (vv. 1847-1973).
8. Memory and delivery (vv. 1974-2070).

Figurative language is discussed in detail in the Poetria nova, which marks this treatise as grammatical. However, two of the central parts of the Poetria nova - Invention of subject matter and disposition or organization of the work - belong to the domain of rhetoric. Likewise, memory and delivery are traditionally affiliated with rhetoric. The Poetria nova thus constitutes an intersection of grammar and rhetoric in the medieval curriculum.

The Poetria nova opens with a famous passage about planning a poem and defining the limits of its subject matter. Geoffrey of Vinsauf distinguishes between the natural order and the artificial or artistic order in which the author can narrate the events.Geoffrey of Vinsauf prefers the artificial order and recommends a proverbial opening.

The subject matter can be presented either through a lengthy treatment or a brief recapitulation of the story. Among the methods of amplification are refining or dwelling on a point; periphrasis; comparison; apostrophe; prosopopeia; digression; description; and opposition. Brevity of the narration can be achieved by the following devices: emphasis, articulus, absolute ablative "without a rower" [i.e. a preposition], skillful indication of one thing among the rest, "chains removed from between clauses" [i.e. omitting conjunctions], the sense of many clauses in one, and omitting repetition of the same word.

Geoffrey of Vinsauf distinguishes between ornatus gravis ['difficult/serious/dignified ornament'] and ornatus levis ['easy/pleasant/light ornament']. Gravitas can be achieved by using the ten tropes listed in the pseudo-Ciceronian Rhetorica ad Herennium.The chief trope is metaphor. The ornatus levis includes the figures of diction and of thought given in the Rhetorica ad Herennium.These figures are for the most part non-metaphorical.

The doctrine of conversion is a systematic method of varying a given sentence while preserving its meaning to make the sequence of words pleasant. The doctrine of determination consists primarily of creating a long sequence of brief phrases. This is the method and the manner of Sidonius. The contrary practice is that of Seneca: to round off the verses with a quick conclusion. Geoffrey of Vinsauf, however, prefers to be "neither as long, nor as short, rather both long and short, being made both out of neither".

The remaining doctrines are treated very briefly. Words should be carefully chosen to keep the balance of meaning and form. The characters' actions and their speeches should be appropriate for their age, and the overall color should be in harmony with the subject. Excessive alliteration, awkward violation of word order, and overly long periods are stylistic faults to be avoided. To polish his work an author has to apply "first the mind, second the ear, and third and last, that which should conclude the matter - usage". Only delight fosters memory. In delivery, one must follow the sense imitating in a controlled manner the emotions called for by the subject. Geoffrey of Vinsauf concludes his treatise with the observation that "power comes from speech, since life and death rest in its hands; however, language may perchance be aided, in moderation, by both expression and gesture".

== Influence ==
Popularity of Geoffrey of Vinsauf's didactic treatises has raised the question of possible influence on the later English poets such as Geoffrey Chaucer (ca. 1342-1400), Thomas Usk (d. 1388), and John Gower (ca. 1330-1408). Chaucer's parody in the Nun's Priest's Tale of Geoffrey of Vinsauf's use of apostrophe seems to ridicule the instruction provided in the Poetria nova, and has therefore been interpreted as Chaucer's contempt for Geoffrey of Vinsauf's doctrine. A more profound examination of Chaucer's principles of composition, however, reveals that the essential scheme of the Wife of Bath's Prologue (specifically, lines 193-828) conforms to the doctrine promulgated by Geoffrey of Vinsauf's Documentum. The integration of the Poetria nova precepts into Troilus and Criseyde I, 1065-71 reflects Chaucer's interest in rhetorical doctrine in general, and in Geoffrey of Vinsauf's in particular.

The contribution of Geoffrey of Vinsauf to the artes poetriae is acknowledged by such distinguished rhetoricians, as John of Garland (ca. 1180–ca. 1258), a teacher of grammar and literature at the University of Paris, in the Parisiana poetria (known also as De arte prosayca, metrica, et rithmica, written and revised probably between 1220 and 1235), and Eberhard the German in the Laborintus. Geoffrey of Vinsauf is praised by Gervais of Melkley and Desiderius Erasmus (1469–1536). Kelly asserts that understanding and appreciation of the writings of the great medieval poets, such as Chaucer, Dante, Gottfried von Strassburg, and Chrétien de Troyes, can only be fully achieved if studied in the light of the instruction contained in treatises like Geoffrey of Vinsauf's Poetria nova and Documentum de modo et arte dictandi et versificandi.
