= Ars Poetica =

Ars Poetica may refer to:

- "Ars Poetica" (Horace), a c. 19 BC poem by Horace
- Ars poetriae, a medieval genre of poetics
- "Ars Poetica" (Archibald MacLeish), a 1926 poem by Archibald MacLeish
- Ars poetica (Israel), an Israeli poetry collective
- "Ars Poetica" (Charents), poem collection by Yeghishe Charents (Armenian poet)
