= Ars poetriae =

The Latin term ars poetriae ("art of poetry", plural artes poetriae) refers both to the medieval theory of poetic composition and to a genre of technical treatise on the same. A core set of four texts known as artes poetriae was first published by Edmond Faral in 1924. Two more were later added. All six of them were written in Latin between about 1175 and 1280 by five different authors all connected to the University of Paris. All six texts have received critical editions and English translations.

Garland's Parisiana

The six artes are:

- Matthew of Vendôme, Ars versificatoria ("Art of versifying"), c. 1175
- Geoffrey of Vinsauf, Poetria nova ('New poetry'), c. 1210
- Geoffrey of Vinsauf, Documentum de modo et arte dictandi et versificandi ("Instruction in the method and art of prose and verse writing"), c. 1210
- Gervase of Melkley, Ars poetica ('Poetic art'), c. 1215
- John of Garland, Parisiana poetria de arte prosaica, metrica, et rithmica ("Paris poetics of the art of prose, meter, and rhythm"), after 1229
- Eberhard the German, Laborintus ("That which contains difficulty"), before 1280

The most important of these is the Poetria nova by Vinsauf. At least twelve medieval commentaries on the Poetria nova are known and it survives in over 200 manuscripts. It is itself written in verse and was used as a school text for primary (i.e., preuniversity) education. The works of Gervase and Eberhard, on the other hand, are closer to the grammatical tradition.

The artes poetriae draw heavily on three classical works: Cicero's De inventione, Horace's Ars poetica and the Pseudo-Ciceronian Rhetorica ad Herennium. A few make use of Cicero's De oratore and Quintilian's Institutio oratoria. They stand at the intersection of the fields of rhetoric, grammar and poetry.

== Bibliography ==
- Kelly, Douglas (1991). The Arts of Poetry and Prose. Brepols.
- Murphy, J. J. (2008). "The Arts of Poetry and Prose". In Alastair Minnis; Ian Johnson (eds.). The Cambridge History of Literary Criticism. Vol. II: The Middle Ages. Cambridge University Press. pp. 42–67.
- Nims, Margaret F. (1982). "Ars Poetica". In Joseph R. Strayer (ed.). Dictionary of the Middle Ages. Vol. 1. Charles Scribner's Sons. p. 553–555.
- Purcell, William Michael (1996). Ars Poetriae: Rhetorical and Grammatical Invention at the Margin of Literacy. University of South Carolina Press.
- Ziolkowski, Jan (2001). "Medieval Rhetoric". In Thomas O. Sloane (ed.). Encyclopedia of Rhetoric. Oxford University Press.
