= Jan M. Ziolkowski =

American Latinist

Jan Ziolkowski (born November 17, 1956) is an American Latinist, who occupies the Arthur Kingsley Porter Professorship of Medieval Latin at Harvard University. From 2007 to 2020 he served as Director of the Dumbarton Oaks Research Library and Collection. His scholarship has focused on the literature, especially in Latin, of the Middle Ages.

In the United States, he was elected a Member of the Medieval Academy of America in 2008, the American Academy of Arts and Sciences in 2010, and the American Philosophical Society in 2017. Abroad, he was appointed a corresponding member of the Austrian Academy of Sciences in 2006 and of the Academia Europaea in 2015. In 2015 he was awarded an Austrian Decoration for Science and Art, the Austrian Cross of Honor for Science and Art, First Class.

He held a National Endowment for the Humanities Summer Stipend in 1983, an American Council for Learned Societies Fellowship in 1986, and a John Simon Guggenheim Fellowship in 1987–1988. In 2005-2006 he was a fellow-in-residence at the Netherlands Institute for Advanced Study. Since becoming U.S. representative to the International Medieval Latin Committee in 1988, he has served as vice president from 1993 to 1999 and as president from 2000.

== Personal life ==
Born in New Haven, Connecticut, he is the son of Theodore Ziolkowski, a Germanist and comparativist, and Yetta (née Goldstein) Ziolkowski.

== Career ==
Like the rest of his family, Jan Ziolkowski received his primary and secondary education in public schools, the last one being Princeton High School in New Jersey, from which he graduated in 1974. He earned his A.B. summa cum laude from Princeton University in 1977 and was inducted into Phi Beta Kappa. His senior thesis, supervised by the Classicist Janet Martin and the Chaucerian and medievalist D. W. Robertson Jr., was published in revised form as a monograph in 1985 as Alan of Lille’s Grammar of Sex: The Meaning of Grammar to a Twelfth Century Intellectual. From 1977 through 1980 he was a Marshall Scholar at the University of Cambridge. In 1980-1981 he was a Fellow at the American Academy in Rome. In 1982 he received his Ph.D. in medieval Latin, under the direction of the late Peter Dronke.

Ziolkowski began teaching at Harvard University in 1981, at the age of twenty-four. In his initial year he held the rank of instructor: he had submitted his dissertation in the spring of 1981, but could not take his viva until December or have the degree confirmed until the spring of 1982. Thus he acquired formal standing as an assistant professor in 1982. In 1984 he was promoted to associate professor. In 1987 he received tenure as a full professor, at thirty. For his first two decades of service at Harvard, his appointment was split between Classics and Comparative Literature. He became involved early in the Committees on Folklore and Mythology and on Medieval Studies. In administrative service, he served three terms as chair of the Department of Comparative Literature and concurrently two as chair of the Committee on Medieval Studies. In 2006–2007 he chaired the Department of Classics for one year.

From 2007 through 2020, Ziolkowski directed the Dumbarton Oaks Research Library and Collection, a Harvard institution for advanced research in Byzantine, Pre-Columbian, and Garden and Landscape studies.

== Publications ==
Ziolkowski's books include wide-ranging explorations of literary and intellectual history. The first, published in 1985 by the Medieval Academy of America, was Alan of Lille’s Grammar of Sex: The Meaning of Grammar to a Twelfth Century Intellectual. This monograph marked a first step into the scrutiny of language and literature relating to sexuality and obscenity, notably a later study of a poem about the biblical figure Jezebel and a collective volume of essays, which came out in 1998, entitled Obscenity: Social Control and Artistic Creation in the European Middle Ages.

His later investigations include examinations of Medieval Latin literature associated with folk literature, such as Talking Animals: Medieval Latin Beast Poetry, in 1993, and Fairy Tales from Before Fairy Tales: The Medieval Latin Past of Wonderful Lies, in 2007. Both studies are notable for extensive appendixes of translations.

His second book was the editio princeps of Nigel of Canterbury, Miracles of the Virgin Mary, in Verse. Miracula sancte Dei genitricis Marie, uersifice, which appeared as Toronto Medieval Latin Texts 17 in 1986. Within a decade he brought into print, again in the first edition ever, the original Latin (with English translations) of additional works by the same poet in Nigel of Canterbury, The Passion of St. Lawrence, Epigrams, and Marginal Poems, Mittellateinische Studien und Texte 14, in 1994.

Ziolkowski's other critical editions of medieval Latin texts, with translations and substantial commentaries, include Jezebel: A Norman Latin Poem of the Early Eleventh Century, in 1989; A Garland of Latin Satire, Wisdom, and History: Verse from Twelfth-Century France (Carmina Houghtoniensia), co-edited with Bridget Balint in 2007; and Solomon and Marcolf, in 2008.

His best-known work in the genre of edition cum translation and commentary was The Cambridge Songs (Carmina cantabrigiensia), in 1994 (reprinted in 1998), which has been taken as the basis for the recording Lost Songs of a Rhineland Harper by the Sequentia (music group), an ensemble for medieval music directed by Benjamin Bagby, and for Cambridge Songs Suite No. 1 and No. 2 by the composer Jim Taylor of LeTourneau University.

In English-only volumes, Ziolkowski co-edited The Medieval Craft of Memory: An Anthology of Words and Pictures, with Mary Carruthers in 2002, and translated Letters of Peter Abelard, Beyond the Personal, in 2008. Between these two books he edited and introduced a translation from the French of a still-classic examination of Medieval Latin metrics by the late Swedish philologist Dag Norberg.

Ziolkowski's first major involvement in the study of the Roman poet Virgil came in 2008, when he brought out with Michael C. J. Putnam, emeritus of Brown University, a stout anthology of translations, The Virgilian Tradition: The First Fifteen Hundred Years, published by Yale University Press. In 2014 he expanded upon that resource with the three volumes of The Virgil Encyclopedia, co-edited with his colleague Richard F. Thomas of Harvard University, published by Wiley-Blackwell. He took his initial step into the classical tradition in 2007, when his Nota Bene: Reading Classics and Writing Songs in the Early Middle Ages was released in Publications of The Journal of Medieval Latin. This book explores the functions that musical notation served in the reception of Classical Latin literature in early medieval schools and education.

Among his contributions to the study of Dante Alighieri, Ziolkowski edited Dante and the Greeks, published by Dumbarton Oaks Publications in 2014, and Dante and Islam, published by Fordham University Press in 2015. Both books set the Italian poet in broader contexts, along the way helping to connect Dante studies with medieval, Byzantine, and Islamic studies.

In 2018 he brought out The Juggler of Notre Dame and the Medievalizing of Modernity, published with open access by Open Book Publishers. These six volumes probe a single story from its first incarnation in a medieval French poem in the early thirteenth century through its later reception from the 1870s down to the present day. Alongside the multivolume scholarship, he arranged for the reprinting of two books, Barbara Cooney, The Little Juggler, Adapted from an Old French Legend and Illustrated, from 1961, and José María Souvirón, El juglarcillo de la Virgen, illustrated by Roser Bru, from 1942. He put into English a French version of the story for two translations, Anatole France, The Juggler of Our Lady. Written out, illuminated, and historiated by Malatesta, and The Juggler of Notre Dame, illustrated by Maurice Lalau.

Ziolkowski founded the Dumbarton Oaks Medieval Library and served as its general editor from 2008 through 2020. He edited and co-translated the volume of Satires by Sextus Amarcius and Eupolemius, in 2011.

His interest in the history and theory of philology became apparent first in the introduction to the short collection On Philology, printed by Penn State Press in 1990, which he edited after organizing the conference on which the journal issue and book were based. His widest-ranging reprise of the topic was in a review entitled “Metaphilology." In 2008, he devoted an article to "The Role of Interpretive Studies in Medieval Latin Philology." In 2019, he brought out "Medieval Precedents for Sceptical Philology."

Among his contributions to the history of scholarship, Ziolkowski supplied a new foreword to Literary Language and Its Public by Erich Auerbach when reprinted by Princeton University Press in 1993. Four years later he provided a fresh introduction to Vergil in the Middle Ages by Domenico Comparetti when it was reissued in paperback by the same press in 1997. In 2003 he translated for the first time, from the original German, Auerbach's "Epilegomena to Mimesis" as an appendix to the fiftieth-anniversary reprint of Mimesis: The Representation of Reality in Western Literature. That book opened with an introduction by Edward Said.

== Partial bibliography ==
Books and monographs

- —— (2018). The Juggler of Notre Dame and the Medievalizing of Modernity. Vol. 1: The Middle Ages. Cambridge, UK: Open Book Publishers. doi:10.11647/obp.0132. ISBN 978-1-78374-435-0.
- —— (2018). The Juggler of Notre Dame and the Medievalizing of Modernity. Vol. 2: Medieval Meets Medievalism. Cambridge, UK: Open Book Publishers. doi:10.11647/obp.0143. ISBN 978-1-78374-508-1.
- —— (2018). The Juggler of Notre Dame and the Medievalizing of Modernity. Vol. 3: The American Middle Ages. Cambridge, UK: Open Book Publishers. doi:10.11647/obp.0146. ISBN 978-1-78374-523-4.
- —— (2018). The Juggler of Notre Dame and the Medievalizing of Modernity. Vol. 4: Picture That: Making a Show of the Jongleur. Cambridge, UK: Open Book Publishers. doi:10.11647/obp.0147. ISBN 978-1-78374-531-9.
- —— (2018). The Juggler of Notre Dame and the Medievalizing of Modernity. Vol. 5: Tumbling into the Twentieth Century. Cambridge, UK: Open Book Publishers. doi:10.11647/obp.0148. ISBN 978-1-78374-536-4.
- —— (2018). The Juggler of Notre Dame and the Medievalizing of Modernity. Vol. 6: War and Peace, Sex and Violence. Cambridge, UK: Open Book Publishers. doi:10.11647/obp.0149. ISBN 978-1-78374-541-8.
- —— (2007). Nota Bene: Reading Classics and Writing Songs in the Early Middle Ages. Publications of The Journal of Medieval Latin. Vol. 7. Turnhout: Brepols. ISBN 978-2-503-52534-1.
- —— (2007). Fairy Tales from Before Fairy Tales: The Medieval Latin Past of Wonderful Lies. Ann Arbor: University of Michigan Press. doi:10.3998/mpub.105158. ISBN 978-0-472-03379-9.
- ——, ed. (1994). The Cambridge Songs (Carmina cantabrigiensia). Garland Library of Medieval Literature, series A. Vol. 66. Translated by Ziolowski, Jan. New York: Garland Publishing. ISBN 978-0-86698-234-4.
- —— (1993). Talking Animals: Medieval Latin Beast Poetry. Philadelphia: University of Pennsylvania Press. ISBN 978-0-8122-3161-8.
- —— (1985). Alan of Lille's Grammar of Sex: The Meaning of Grammar to a Twelfth-Century Intellectual. Speculum Anniversary Monographs. Vol. 10. Cambridge, MA: The Medieval Academy of America. ISBN 978-0-910956-85-7.

Encyclopedias

- ——; Thomas, Richard, eds. (2014). The Virgil Encyclopedia. Vol. 1–3. Wiley-Blackwell. doi:10.1002/9781118351352. ISBN 978-1-4051-5498-7.

Translation Anthologies

- ——; Putman, Michael C. J., eds. (2008). The Virgilian Tradition: The First Fifteen Hundred Years. New Haven: Yale University Press. ISBN 978-0-300-14831-2.
- ——; Carruthers, Mary, eds. (2002). The Medieval Craft of Memory: An Anthology of Words and Pictures. Philadelphia: University of Pennsylvania Press. ISBN 0-8122-1881-7.

Editions and Translations of Latin Texts

- ——; Pepin, Ronald E., eds. (2022). "Miracles of the Virgin". Miracles of the Virgin; Tract on Abuses. Dumbarton Oaks Medieval Library. Vol. 75. Cambridge, MA: Harvard University Press.
- ——; Pepin, Ronald E., eds. (2011). "Eupolemius". Satires. Eupolemius. Dumbarton Oaks Medieval Library. Vol. 9. Cambridge, MA: Harvard University Press. ISBN 978-0-674-06002-9.
- ——, ed. (2008). Solomon and Marcolf. Harvard Studies in Medieval Latin. Vol. 1. Cambridge, MA: Harvard University Press. ISBN 978-0-674-02841-8.
- ——, ed. (2008). Letters of Peter Abelard, Beyond the Personal. Washington, DC: Catholic University of America Press. ISBN 978-0-8132-1505-1.
- ——; Balint, Bridget K., eds. (2007). A Garland of Latin Satire, Wisdom, and History: Verse from Twelfth-Century France (Carmina Houghtoniensia). Houghton Library Studies. Vol. 1. Cambridge, MA: Harvard University Press for Houghton Library. ISBN 978-0-9765472-7-3.
- ——, ed. (1989). Jezebel: A Norman Latin Poem of the Early Eleventh Century. Humana Civilitas. Vol. 10. New York: Peter Lang. ISBN 0-8204-0932-4.
- Wireker, Nigellus (1994). Ziolkowski, Jan M. (ed.). The Passion of St. Lawrence, Epigrams, and Marginal Poems. Mittellateinische Studien und Texte. Vol. 14. Leiden: E. J. Brill. ISBN 90-04-08865-2.
- Wireker, Nigellus (1986). Miracles of the Virgin Mary, in Verse. Miracula sancte Dei genitricis Marie, uersifice. Toronto Medieval Latin Texts. Vol. 17. Toronto: Pontifical Institute of Mediaeval Studies for the Centre for Medieval Studies. ISBN 978-0-88844-467-7.

Other

- ——, ed. (2015). Dante and Islam. New York: Fordham University Press. ISBN 978-0-8232-6386-8.
- ——, ed. (2014). Dante and the Greeks. Dumbarton Oaks Medieval Humanities. Washington, DC: Dumbarton Oaks Publications.
- ——, ed. (1998). Obscenity: Social Control and Artistic Creation in the European Middle Ages. Cultures, Beliefs and Traditions. Vol. 4. Leiden: E. J. Brill.
- ——, ed. (1990). On Philology. University Park, PA: Penn State Press.
- Norberg, Dag (2004). Ziolowski, Jan (ed.). An Introduction to the Study of Medieval Latin Versification. Translated by Roti, Grant C.; Skubly, Jacqueline. Washington, DC: Catholic University of America Press.
