= Dictionarius =

Short work

Dictionarius is a short work written about the year 1200 by the medieval English grammarian Johannes de Garlandia or John of Garland. For the use of his students at the University of Paris, he lists the trades and tradesmen that they saw around them every day in the streets of Paris, France. The work is written in Latin with interlinear glosses in Old French.

Johannes de Garlandia is thought to have invented the term dictionarius, a source of the English word dictionary and of similar words in many other modern languages.

== Bibliography ==
- P. H. J. F. Géraud, Paris sous Philippe-le-Bel, d'après des documents originaux (Paris: Crapelet, 1837) pp. 580–612.
- T. Hunt, "Vernacular glosses in medieval manuscripts" in CN vol. 39 (1979) pp. 9–37.
- T. Hunt, Teaching and learning Latin in thirteenth-century England. 3 vols. Cambridge: Brewer, 1991.
- Frédérique Lachaud, "La première description des métiers de Paris: le Dictionarius de Jean de Garlande (vers 1220–1230)" in Espaces, acteurs et structures de la consommation en milieu urbain au Moyen Âge (special issue of Revue d’Histoire Urbaine, 2006).
- B. B. Rubin, The Dictionarius of John de Garlande and the Author's Commentary translated into English and annotated by Barbara Blatt Rubin. Lawrence, KS: Coronado Press, 1981.
- A. Scheler, "Trois traités de lexicographie latine du XIIe et du XIIIe siècle" in Jahrbuch für Romanische und Englische Literatur vol. 6 (1865) pp. 43–59, 142–162, 287–321, 370–379; vol. 7 pp. 58–74, 155–173; vol. 8, pp. 75–93, 142–162.
- Thomas Wright, A Volume of Vocabularies (London: Joseph Mayer, 1857) pp. 120–138.
