= Philip de Thaun =

12th-century Anglo-Norman poet

Philip de Thaun (Note: Sometimes Philippe de Thaun, Philippe de Thaon Philip de Thaün, or Philip de Thaon) was the first Anglo-Norman poet. He is the first known poet to write in the Anglo-Norman French vernacular language, rather than Latin. Two poems by him are signed with his name, making his authorship of both clear. A further poem is probably written by him as it bears many writing similarities to his other two poems.

Philip's earliest work is a work on the calendar, which is called variously Comput, Cumpoz, Compuz, or Computus. Drawing on earlier works, he set forth ways to calculate dates, information on etymologies of the days of the week, and zodiacal lore. His second work – called variously Bestiaire, Bestiary, or Li Bestiaire – is a bestiary, a translation of an earlier Latin work on animals – both actual and legendary. His last known poem is Le Livre de Sibile, a translation of an earlier Latin poem on prophecies of a sibyl.

== Life ==
Philip was probably a member of the noble family that held Than or Thaon in Normandy, near Caen. He may have arrived in England late in the 11th century, perhaps following his uncle, Humphrey de Thaon. Humphrey was a chaplain to Eudo Dapifer, who was an official for Prince Henry, later King Henry I of England. Paul Meyer disagrees with attributing noble birth to Philip, arguing instead that he was from an unknown background.

== Writings ==
Three works by Philip survive. Two are signed with his name and are thus securely in his authorship. These works are those on the calendar and the bestiary. A third work, although not signed with Philip's name, is probably by him.

=== Comput ===
The first of Philip's works is the Comput, Cumpoz, Compuz, or Computus. (Note: It is given the name Liber de creaturis in Thomas Wright's 1841 work Popular Treatises on Science.) According to Ian Short, who edited the modern edition of it, it was written in 1113; other scholars date it to between 1113 and 1119. The Comput contains the first surviving example of scientific, or technical French. It is the first work on calendars to appear in French. Philippe's intent in creating the Comput was to improve the pastoral care provided by secular clergy, and he seems to have followed the example of earlier Old English computi in doing so.

The Comput deals with the calendar, and is written in hexasyllabic couplets, using as its sources Bede, Chilperic of St Gall, Pliny the Elder, and Garlandus Compotista, as well as an obscure clerk of Henry I's named Thurkil. According to the scholar Geoff Rector, it is "not so much an aid to computistical calculations as a grammarian's poetic compilation of biblical and classical knowledge". Rector further states that it contains "etymologies of the days of the week" and explanations of the various zodiac signs. It was dedicated to Philip's uncle, Humphrey. Rector suggests that the dedication was intended to help the author be noticed by King Henry, as Humphrey's master Eudo was close to the king.

Six manuscripts survive of the work survive from the 12th century – three in the British Library, one at Cambridge University, one at Lincoln Cathedral, and one in the Vatican Library. The prologue of the work states that there were tables to help calculate dates that went with the work, but they do not survive in any of the extant manuscripts.

=== Bestiary ===
Philip's second work is the Bestiaire, Bestiary', or Li Bestiaire, dedicated to Queen Adeliza of Louvain, second wife of Henry I of England. It was a bestiary, a medieval literary genre describing and depicting the natural world, with details of legendary animals indiscriminately mixed with more reliable information. Philip's Bestiaire was written between 1121 and 1139 in French. Philip may have written the Bestiarire partly because of the interest of Adeliza's husband, in wildlife as well as hunting. There are some indications that after 1154 Philip changed the dedication of this work to Eleanor of Aquitaine, the new wife and queen of the Henry's grandson King Henry II of England, who had just ascended the throne of England.

The Bestiarie is a translation of the Physiologus. The Physiologus, in the words of Meradith McMunn, provided "information about real and imaginary animals". Philip's work is a poem mostly in rhyming hexasyllabic couplets, with the final three hundred or so lines in octosyllabic verse. It is divided into a prologue, the main body of the work, and an epilogue. The main body consists of thirty-eight chapters, of which thirty-five are on animals and the other three are on precious stones. Although the translation is not regarded as a great literary work, it is the earliest surviving translation of the Physiologus into French and is a critical reference for Anglo-Norman French. (Note: Philip's Bestiaire survives in three manuscripts.) The Bestiaire is one of two works from medieval England that relates the story that a crocodile cries when it eats a human. This story is the basis for the phrase "crocodile tears". (Note: The other work is De naturis rerum by Alexander Nequam.) Philip's work is also one of only two by French writers to give a physical description of the legendary creature the phoenix. (Note: The other writer is Pierre de Beauvais, who wrote after Philip.) Philip also ascribed to the lion the ability to draw a circle in the ground with its tail. This circle would keep any prey from leaving the lion's circle.

The Bestiarie has three manuscripts still surviving.

=== Other works ===
Philip's last surviving work is Le Livre de Sibile. This work is a translation into French of a Latin poem, the Prophecy of the Tibertine Sibyl. Philip dedicated his translation to Matilda, the daughter of King Henry I. (Note: Matilda was also the stepdaughter of Queen Adeliza.) It is also in hexasyllabic verse and includes some information from a work by Adso of Montier-en-Der entitled Libellus de Antichristo. The only extant manuscript of Le Livre does not have any indication that the work was by Philip, however. (Note: This manuscript is in the Bibliothèque nationale in Paris.) The main support for its attribution to Philip is the similarity of style between it and the two known works by Philip.

Three other works have occasionally been attributed to Philip but are not considered to be definitely written by him. These are the Debat de l'ame et du corps and two lapidaries – one alphabetical and one apocalyptic. The Debat, or in English Debate between Body and Soul, is a short poem again in hexasyllabic couplets, and takes the form of a debate between the two things mentioned in its title.
