= De triumphis ecclesiae =

De triumphis ecclesiae is a Latin epic in elegiac metre, written c. 1250 by Johannes de Garlandia, an English grammarian who taught at the universities of Toulouse and Paris. A desultory work, it mentions episodes of the Crusades (including the Albigensian Crusade) alongside events in Johannes' own life, illustrating the details of his affair with a young man from his University, with sketches of some acquaintances including John of London, his teacher at Oxford; bishop Foulques of Toulouse; Alan of Lille, a contemporary at Paris; and Roland of Cremona, a contemporary at Toulouse.
