= Ortolanus =

Medieval alchemist

Ortolanus (fl. 1300), also known as Hortulanus, was a medieval alchemist. Little information exists about his life and identity. He is best known for his influential commentary on The Emerald Tablet entitled Liber super textum Hermetis. It was composed before 1325, and the original work has two sections.

The first is entitled Spiritus quinte essentie et in quo elemento habitat. It is dedicated to making a prodigious substance, the quintessence, from a mysterious material called argento vivo, which happens to be wine. Ortholan is the first author to relate alcohol and quintessence, half a century before Jean de Roquetaillade. In his opinion, the quintessence would be present everywhere, but it can best be attained through certain substances, ideally wine.

The second part is a theoretical text. It is written as a comment to the Emerald Tablet attributed to Hermes. Its theme revolves around the primordial heat, praised by Hermes as a universal substrate that gives dynamism to the whole cosmos. Ortolanus believes alcohol or quintessence is the hidden primordial heat in all material things. This second part was published in the alchemical compilation In hoc volumine de alchemia continentur hæc (1541). It was printed again in 1545. A 1560 edition appeared under the name Compendium alchimiae and was attributed to Johannes de Garlandia (philologist). Another edition followed in 1571. With this widespread publishing, the second section became very popular among alchemists of the Early modern period. The first part, which was never published, was forgotten and no one related Ortolanus to the development of the concept of quintaessencia.

== Identity ==
The true identity of Ortolanus is unknown. His works have been falsely attributed to Johannes de Garlandia (philologist) (fl. 1205–1255), and more probably to Jakob Ortlein of Nördlingen (fl. 1275–1325), who may have been a Dominican friar. He has also been given the names Martin Ortolan or Lortholain in later sources.

The preface of his famous commentary gives a hint to his identity: "I Hortulanus, so called from the Gardens bordering upon the sea coast, wrapped in a Iacobin skinne, unworthy to be called a Disciple of Philosophie...".

== Works ==
- Rosarius minor. Can be found in the Mellon Collection, Yale University Library MS. 5.
- Textus alkimie.
- Liber super textum Hermetis or Commentary on the emerald tablet of Hermes. Ortolanus interpreted the text of the Emerald Tablet as an allegorical physico-chemical recipe for the Philosopher's Stone.

There is a later commentary by an alchemist called John Bumbles or Dombelay: Practica vera alchemica. It was completed in 1386 and dedicated to Kuno II von Falkenstein. This work claims to be based on a practice done by the author himself or someone else in 1358.
