= Ludwig Lemcke =

German literary historian and romanist (1816–1884)

Ludwig Lemcke (25 December 1816 in Brandenburg an der Havel – 21 September 1884 in Giessen) was a German Romance philologist and literary historian.

He studied history, philology and languages at the University of Berlin, and from 1841 worked as a private scholar, and later as a schoolteacher, in Braunschweig. In 1862 he succeeded Adolf Ebert as an associate professor of modern languages and Western literature at the University of Marburg. In 1865 he attained a full professorship, and two years later, relocated as a professor to the University of Giessen. In 1873/74 he served as university rector.

He was editor of the periodical, Jahrbuch für Romanische und Englische Literatur ("Yearbook of Romance and English Literature"), and the author of several articles in the Allgemeine Deutsche Biographie.

== Selected works ==
- Thomas Babington Macaulay's Geschichte von England seit dem Regierungsantritte Jacob des Zweiten, 1852 – Thomas Babington Macaulay's The History of England from the Accession of James the Second.
- Handbuch der spanischen Litteratur, 1855 – Handbook of Spanish literature.
- Die epische, lyrische und didaktische Poesie, 1855 – Epic, lyrical and didactic poetry.
- Shakspeare in seinem Verhältnisse zu Deutschland, 1864 – Shakespeare in his associations with Germany.
- Die Wechselbeziehungen zwischen Geisteswissenschaften und Naturwissenschaften, 1873 – The interrelations between the humanities and natural sciences.
