= Morale scolarium =

1241 book of poems by Johannes de Garlandia

Morale scolarium is a book of mildly satirical elegiac poems composed in Latin in 1241 by Johannes de Garlandia, an English grammarian who taught at the universities of Toulouse and Paris. The text includes notes and interlinear glosses written by the author, aimed at students of Latin. Morale scolarium, known in five manuscripts, was edited with a paraphrase and commentary by L. J. Paetow in 1927.

== Bibliography ==
- Two Medieval Satires on the University of Paris: La Bataille des VII Ars of Henri d’Andeli and the Morale Scolarium of John of Garland ed. Louis John Paetow. Berkeley: University of California Press, 1927.
