= Honorius Augustodunensis =

Christian theologian

Honorius Augustodunensis (c. 1080 – c. 1140), commonly known as Honorius of Autun, was a 12th-century Christian theologian.

== Life ==
Augustodunensis said that he is Honorius Augustodunensis ecclesiae presbyter et scholasticus. "Augustodunensis" was taken to mean Autun (Augustodunum), but that identification is now generally rejected. There is no solid reasoning for any other identification (such as Augst/Augustodunensem praesulem near Basle, Augsburg/Augusta Vindelicorum in Swabia, or Augustinensis, from St Augustine's Abbey at Canterbury), so his by-name has stuck. It is certain that he was a monk and that he traveled to the Kingdom of England and was a student of Anselm's for some time. Toward the end of his life, he was in the Scots Monastery, Regensburg, Bavaria.

== Works ==
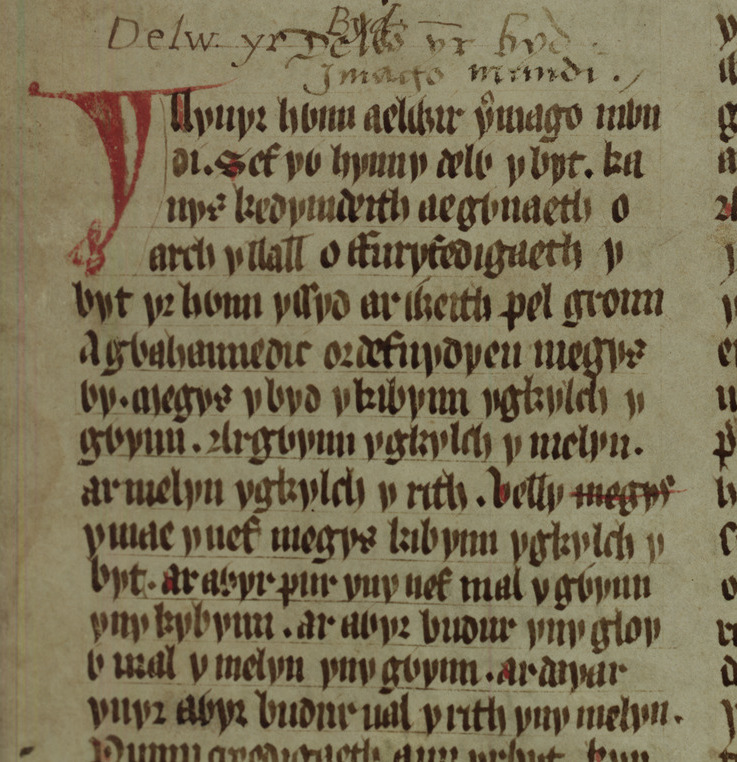
Opening few lines of the Welsh adaption of the Imago Mundi from the Red Book of Hergest (Jesus College, Oxford MS 111). Y llyfyr hwn a elwir Imago Mwndi. Sef yw hynny delw y byd. English translation: This book is called Imago Mundi. The whole world is contained within.

Among Honorius's works are:

- Elucidarium: a survey of Christian beliefs (written in England). It was translated frequently into vernacular.
- Sigillum sanctae Mariae: a set of lessons for how to celebrate the Assumption, together with a commentary on The Song of Songs, which he sees as being principally about Mary.
- Gemma animae: An allegorical view of the liturgy and its practices.
- A commentary on The Song of Songs, (preserved in a manuscript from c. 1170).
- A long commentary on the Psalms.
- Speculum Ecclesiae, a collection of sermons.
- Clavis physicae, the first part (1–315) is a summary of the first four books of Johannes Scotus Erigena Periphyseon (De divisione naturae), the second part (316–529) is a reproduction of the fifth book.
- De luminaribus ecclesiae: a bibliography of Christian authors, which ends with a list of twenty-one of his own works.

His most important work was the Imago mundi, an encyclopedia of popular cosmology and geography combined with a chronicle of world history. It was translated into many different vernacular languages and was popular throughout the medieval period. It contained, among other things, a scheme for the operation of guardian angels.

A major scholar of Honorius is Valerie Flint, whose essays on him are collected in Ideas in the Medieval West: Texts and their Contexts (London, 1988). See also her study of Honorius in Constant J. Mews and Valerie I. J. Flint, Peter Abelard; Honorius of Regensburg (Aldershot, 1995).

== Notes ==
- Herbermann, Charles, ed. (1913). "Honorius of Autun" . Catholic Encyclopedia. New York: Robert Appleton Company.

== Bibliography ==
- Honorius Augustodunensis, Clavis physicae, critical edition of the first part (§§ 1–315) and introduction (in Italian) by Paolo Lucentini, Roma: Edizioni di Storia e Letteratura, 1974
- Honorius Augustodunensis, La «Clavis physicae» (316–529) di Honorius Augustodunensis. Studio e edizione, critical edition of the second part (§§ 316–529) and introduction (in Italian) by Pasquale Arfé, Napoli: Liguori 2012.
- Honorius Augustodunensis, Jewel of the Soul, edition and English translation of the Gemma animae by Zachary Thomas and Gerhard Eger, 2 vols., Dumbarton Oaks Medieval Library 79, 80 (Cambridge, MA: Harvard University Press, 2023).
- The Oxford Dictionary of the Christian Church, edited by F. A. Cross, ISBN 0-19-211545-6.
- Graeme Dunphy, "Historical Writing in and after the Old High German period" in Brian Murdoch, German Literature of the Early Middle Ages, 2004, 201–25.
