= Egbert of Liège =

11th century German writer and teacher

Egbert
- Occupation: teacher at the cathedral school of Liège
- Writing career
- Language: Latin
- Period: around 1023
- Genre: instructive compilation
- Notable work: Fecunda Ratis ("The Richly Laden Ship")

Egbert of Liège, in Latin: Ecbertus Leodiensis, was an 11th-century educator and author, working at the cathedral school in Liège (in what is now Belgium). His main work, produced around 1023, is an educational collection entitled Fecunda Ratis ("The Richly Laden Ship"), divided into two parts, the "Prora" (Prow), containing proverbs and classical and secular stories, and the "Puppis" (Poop deck) with extracts from biblical and patristic writers. The collection contains the earliest known precursor of the Little Red Riding Hood story, entitled "De puella a lupellis servata". A critical edition of the Fecunda Ratis by Ernst Voigt was published in the series Monumenta Germaniae Historica in 1889. An English translation by Robert Gary Babcock has been published as book 25 in the Dumbarton Oaks Medieval Library (Harvard University Press, 2013). An extract describes the origins of the red riding hood:

Quidam suscepit sacro de fonte puellam,
Cui dedit et tunicam rubicundo uellere textam.
Quinquagesima sancta fuit babtismatis huius,

Translation:

Somebody raised the girl from the baptismal font,
and gave to her a riding hood woven from red wool.
[For] Holy Pentecost was the day of her baptism.
