= Adolf Ebert =

German Romance philologist (1820–1890)

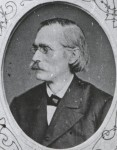

Georg Karl Wilhelm Adolf Ebert (1 June 1820, in Kassel – 1 July 1890, in Leipzig) was a Romance philologist and literary historian. He was an author of literary studies as well as a publisher of periodicals, including the Jahrbuch für Romanische und Englische Literatur.

Ebert studied in Marburg, Leipzig, Göttingen, and Berlin between 1840 and 1843, was appointed as professor at the University of Marburg, and in 1862 came to occupy the newly founded chair of Romance philology at the University of Leipzig. With Ferdinand Wolf he founded and edited the Jahrbuch für Romanische und Englische Literatur, until 1863, when it was taken over by Ludwig Lemcke.

He was the author of the three volume Allgemeine Geschichte der Literatur des Mittelalters im Abendlande ("General history of literature of the Middle Ages in the West").
