= Matthew of Vendôme =

French writer

Matthew of Vendôme (Matheus or Matthaeus Vindocinensis) was a French author of the 12th century, writing in Latin, who was a pupil of Bernard Silvestris, at Tours, as he himself writes.

== Works ==
De Vendôme is known for his Ars Versificatoria, a theoretical work on (Latin) versification, and as the author of Milo, an elegiac comedy; and also wrote on the art of letter-writing, the Ars dictaminis, as with the poor student's begging letter: "I am in want. I have no books and no clothes. Paris drinks money. What tiger would refuse its kitten?"

His works have been issued in a scholarly edition in three volumes: Mathei Vindocinensis Opera; edidit Franco Munari. 3 vols. Roma: Edizioni di storia e letteratura, 1977–1988. v.1. Catalogo dei manoscritti—v.2. Piramus et Tisbe, Milo, Epistule, Tobias—v.3. Ars versificatoria.

== Appraisals of the Ars Versificatoria ==
According to E. R. Curtius,

... he lays stress upon brevity as characteristic of the modern stylistic ideal, in contrast to the ancients. [...] He is the first theoretician who consciously wants to be "modern".

Helen Waddell however considered that "Matthew of Vendóme is responsible for perhaps the dullest Art of Poetry that has ever been written"; while the work has also been criticised for its lack of organisation.

== See also ==
- Geoffrey of Vinsauf
- Gautier de Châtillon
- John of Garland
