= Ferdinand Wolf =

Romance philologist from Austria

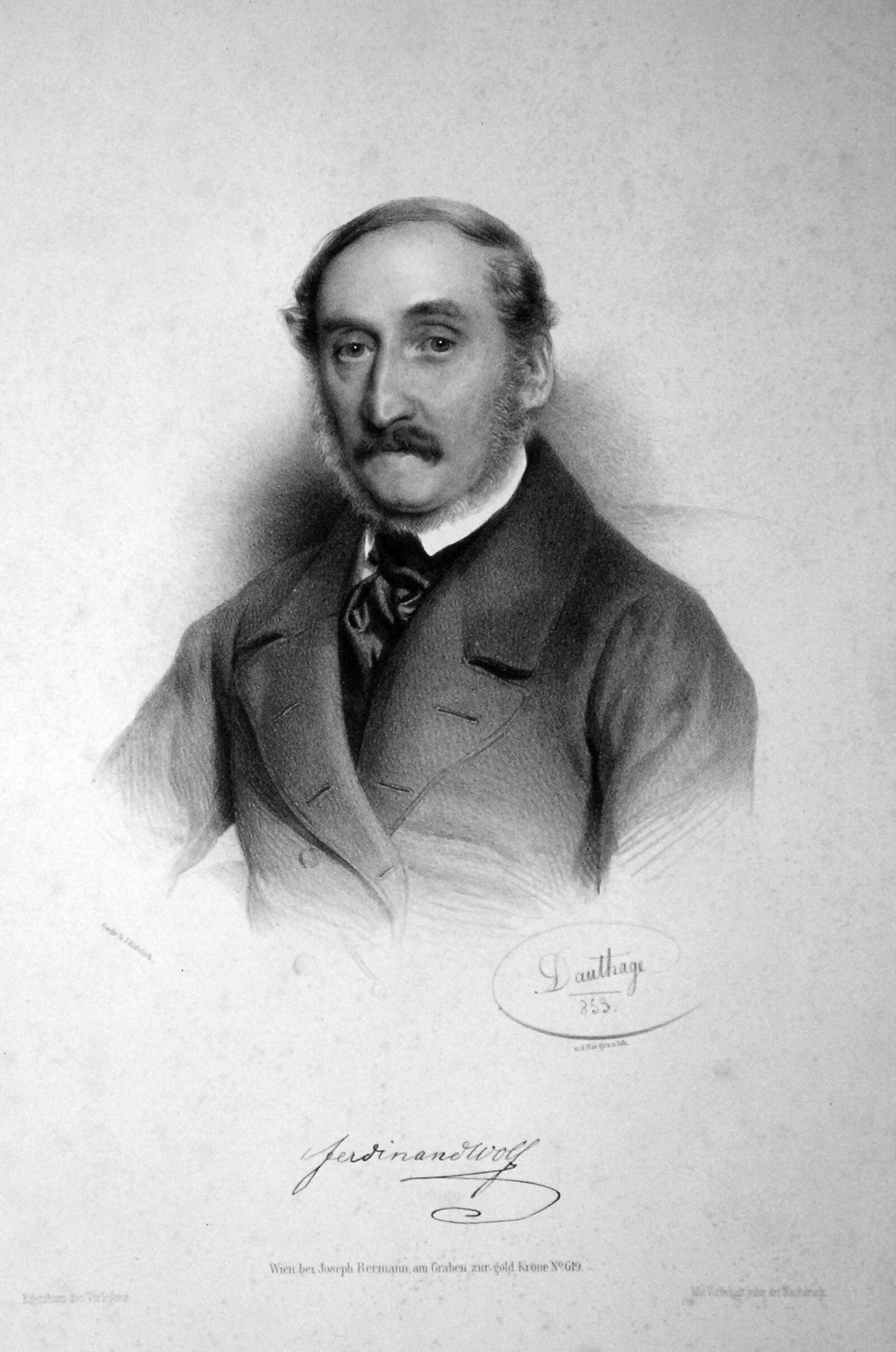
Ferdinand Wolf (lithograph 1853)

Ferdinand Wolf (8 December 1796, Vienna – 18 February 1866, Vienna) was a scholar of Romance studies from Austria. He was an author of literary studies as well as a publisher of periodicals, including the Jahrbuch für Romanische und Englische Literatur.

Wolf studied philosophy and law at the University of Graz, and then literature at the University of Vienna. In 1819, after graduation, he became a scrivener at the kaiserlichen Hofbibliothek, now the Austrian National Library, and was later promoted to research fellow. He was succeeded in this office by his son Adolf. In 1847, Wolf was involved with the foundation of the Austrian Academy of Sciences, which he served as secretary. He is buried in Vienna.

== Publications ==
=== Author ===
- Über die neuesten Leistungen der Franzosen für die Herausgabe ihrer National-Heldengedichte. Wien 1833.
- Floresta de rimas modernas castellanas. 2 Bände. Paris 1837.
- Über die Lais, Sequenzen und Leiche. Heidelberg 1841.
- Rosa de romances. Leipzig 1846 (auch als 3. Teil von Georg Bernhard Depping's Romancero).
- Über eine Sammlung spanischer Romanzen in fliegenden Blättern auf der Universitätsbibliothek zu Prag. Wien 1850.
- Studien zur Geschichte der spanischen und portugiesischen Nationalliteratur. Berlin 1859.
- Dom Antonio José da Silva, der Verfasser der sogenannten „Opern des Juden“ (Operas do Judeu). Gerold, Wien (Digitalisat der Ausgabe von 1860).
- Le Brésil littéraire. Histoire de la littérature brésilienne. Asher, Berlin 1863 (Digitalisat bei gallica.bnf.fr)
- Blütenlese aus der Gelehrtenkorrespondenz. Hrsg. von seinem Sohn Adolf Wolf.

=== Editor ===
- with Stephan Ladislaus Endlicher: Die Sage vom Bruder Rausch. Wien 1835.
- with Konrad Hofmann: Primavera y flor de romances. 2 vols. Berlin 1856.
- with Adolf Ebert: Jahrbuch für romanische und englische Literatur.

=== Translator ===
- George Ticknor: Geschichte der spanischen Literatur ("The history of Spanish literature"). Leipzig 1865.
