= Gervase of Melkley =

Gervase of Melkley or Gervase of Melkeley (born c. 1185, fl. 1200–1219) was an Anglo-Norman scholar and poet.

== Biography ==
Gervais was born in England c. 1185.

Around 1200, he studied in France, probably in Rouen, under poet John of Hauville.

He spent his adult life in England, where he is last attested in 1219.

English chronicler Matthew Paris mentions him as an astrologer and an authority for the life of Stephen Langton, Archbishop of Canterbury. Paris also describes him as the author of the epitaph on William Marshal, 1st Earl of Pembroke, who died in 1219.

In his work, he refers to himself as Gervasius de Saltu Lacteo.

== Ars versificaria ==
He wrote Ars versificaria (The Art of Versifying) c. 1208–1216 (possibly, in 1215–1216), using both classical and medieval sources. Targeted at young students of rhetoric, it includes a list of recommended reading and mainly discusses rhetorical and grammatical figures, with examples, and gives some notes on word formation. It is also known as Ars poetica and De arte versificatoria et modo dictandi.

The book consists of three parts. The first part discusses basic principles common to all types of discourse. The second part is devoted to composition, discussing proverbs, elegance of style, arguments, rules of verse and prose composition. The third part deals with letter-writing.

Among his sources are ancient authors Horace (Ars Poetica), Cicero (De Inventione), Aelius Donatus (Barbarismus) and Juvenal, as well as Bernard Silvestris's Cosmographia, Alain of Lille's Anticlaudianus, John of Hauville's Architrenius, and Geoffrey of Vinsauf's Poetria nova. He also quotes the Book of Psalms and some of his own short poems.

The book is dedicated to a certain Johannes Albus.

The manuscript is conserved in Balliol College, Oxford (MS. Balliol, 276).

== Poems ==
As well as in Ars versificaria, his poems also survive in an early thirteenth-century collection of poetry known as Hunterian Anthology. Apart from works by Gervase, the anthology also includes works by Matthew of Vendôme, Geoffrey of Vinsauf, and some poems of unknown authorship.

His known poems, most of them in elegiac couplets, include:

- "Parmenidis rupes", where he prays that he be granted understanding of Aristotelian complexities.
- "Magnus Alexander", in praise of John de Gray, Bishop of Norwich. Writing in 1200, he congratulates Norwich on the newly elected bishop and compares de Gray to John the Baptist and John the Apostle.
- A long poem about Ovidian lovers Pyramus and Thisbe, known only from an incomplete copy. It was probably written when Gervase was a schoolboy, as a rhetorical exercise.
- "In honorem matris Dei", to Virgin Mary, his only known rhythmical poem.
