= Parisiana poetria =

Work by John of Garland

Parisiana poetria is a work by the medieval English grammarian Johannes de Garlandia or John of Garland. Written about 1240, it is a textbook of the writing of Latin prose, classical verse and medieval (rhythmical) verse, aimed at his students at the University of Paris.

== Bibliography ==
- Traugott Lawler, The Parisiana Poetria of John of Garland. New Haven: Yale University Press, 1974.
- Traugott Lawler, Parisiana poetria. Dumbarton Oaks Medieval Library 65. Cambridge, MA: Harvard University Press, 2020.
