= Nigel de Longchamps =

English satirist and monk

Nigel de Longchamps, also known as Nigel Wireker, (fl. c. 1190, died c. 1200), Neel de Longchamps, or Nigel of Canterbury, was an Anglo-Norman satirist and poet of the late twelfth century, writing in Latin. He is known to have been a monk of Christ Church, Canterbury, from 1186 to 1193, and perhaps earlier (he claims to have met Thomas Becket, killed in 1170).

== Works ==
=== Speculum stultorum ===
He is the author of the Speculum stultorum (A Mirror of Fools), a satire in Latin elegiac verse on the clergy and society in general. The hero is Burnellus, or Brunellus, a foolish ass, who goes in search of a means of lengthening his tail. Brunellus first visits Salernum to obtain drugs for this purpose. However, he loses these when attacked by a Cistercian monk with dogs. He then goes to Paris to study, but makes no progress there, being unable to remember the city's name after eight years of study. He then decides to join a religious order, but instead founds a new one by taking the easiest parts from the rules of other orders. Finally, his master recaptures him.

The poem was immensely popular for centuries. Under the title "Daun Burnel the Asse" it is mentioned by Chaucer in his Canterbury Tales, in the Nun's Priest's Tale.

=== Other works ===
Many other short Latin poems from a thirteenth-century manuscript are attributed to him, along with a prose treatise, Contra Curiales et Officinales Clericos. This treatise is an affectionate reproof to William Longchamp the Chancellor, in his role as Bishop of Ely. Wireker takes his intimate friend (possibly a relative) to task for attempting to combine Church with State.

== Bibliography ==
- Nigel of Longchamp, Speculum Stultorum, ed. and trans. Jill Mann (Oxford, 2023).
- Miracles of the Virgin; Tract on Abuses, ed. and trans. Jan M. Ziolkowski and Ronald E. Pepin, Dumbarton Oaks Medieval Library 75 (Cambridge, MA, 2022) – facing-page Latin text and English translation
- A Mirror for Fools: The Book of Burnel the Ass, trans. John H. Mozley (Oxford, 1961) – English translation
- Speculum Stultorum, ed. John H. Mozley and Robert R. Raymo (Berkeley, 1960) – critical edition of the Latin text
- The Book of Daun Burnel the Ass: Nigellus Wireker's Speculum Stultorum, trans. Graydon W. Regenos (Austin, 1959) – English translation
- Ward, Catalogue of Romances (London, 1883–93)
- Wright, The Anglo-Latin Satirical Poets (London, 1874)
