= Ars Poetica (Archibald MacLeish) =

"Ars Poetica" written by Archibald MacLeish, and first published in 1926, was written as a spin on Horace's classic treatise, which can be translated to “art of poetry.” MacLeish's poem, much like Horace's (which was written in the first century A.D.), can be read as a veritable guide for writing poetry. It can be considered a lyric poem, consisting of 24 lines. It is often referred to as a pillar of New Criticism poetry, and known for being a part of the imagism movement.

== History ==
MacLeish penned "Ars Poetica” in the beginning of his literary career. Born in Illinois in 1892, MacLeish studied law primarily, in his youth- attending such lauded institutions as Yale and Harvard Law. However, before he could begin practicing, America became embroiled in the conflicts of World War I. After returning home from service in the war, MacLeish worked briefly as a lawyer in Boston, but resented the time it took from the poetry he was beginning to create, and decided to switch focus to solely poetry, moving his family to France to pursue the matter. "Ars Poetica” can be attributed to this time in France, where MacLeish studied with contemporaries like Ernest Hemingway and Ezra Pound. During these years, MacLeish produced not only “Ars Poetica,” but several full-length poetry compilations, including: The Happy Marriage and Other Poems (Houghton Mifflin, 1924) and The Pot of Earth (Houghton Mifflin, 1925). In 1928, MacLeish moved back to America, continuing his writing efforts, and even winning the Pulitzer Prize in 1932.

== Text ==
A poem should be palpable and mute

As a globed fruit,

Dumb

As old medallions to the thumb,

Silent as the sleeve-worn stone

Of casement ledges where the moss has grown—

A poem should be wordless

As the flight of birds.

*

A poem should be motionless in time

As the moon climbs,

Leaving, as the moon releases

Twig by twig the night-entangled trees,

Leaving, as the moon behind the winter leaves,

Memory by memory the mind—

A poem should be motionless in time

As the moon climbs.

*

A poem should be equal to:

Not true.

For all the history of grief

An empty doorway and a maple leaf.

For love

The leaning grasses and two lights above the sea—

A poem should not mean

But be.

== Analysis ==
Formally, “Ars Poetica” can be considered a lyric poem, as it expresses personal sentiments surrounding the subject of poetry, and what poetry should be. The poem displays formal elements, but is not subject to one formal trope. The feet in the poem are mostly iambic, but the meter varies. There is not a defined rhyme scheme, but there are rhyming couplets appearing throughout. This homage, but not direct deference to, formality, plays off the poem's relation to (and subversion of) normal poetic devices.

Within this lyric poem, there are three eight line sections, each with a different opinion of what a poem “should be.” In the first section, poems are compared to commonplace items, including: a fruit, old medallions, the stone ledge of a casement window, and a flight of birds. In the next section, a poem is compared to the moon in terms of its universality. Lastly, the third section states that a poem should just “be,” like a sculpture or painting. In this way, our author likens a poem to both a sentiment, as well as a work of art.

But these three sections are rich with more than just comparisons. MacLeish uses a myriad of poetic devices and figures of speech to help identify what a poem is, and moreover what it should be. In lines 1-8, MacLeish uses similes (comparing a poem via like or as to globed fruit, medallions, etc) to construct his idea of an ideal poem. But similes are not the only figures of speech used. In line 5, he uses alliteration(repetition of s sounds in silent, sleeve, and stone); in lines 9-16, our author references paradox by suggesting that a poem should be without motion like a climbing moon (obviously, a “climbing” moon is in action, but when looked at, it appears motionless- hence the paradox). Metaphor is also used in abundance in “Ars Poetica;” lines 9-16 describe a poem by implication to universality, line 12 compares night to an object that can capture. Anaphora, or refrain, is also used throughout the poem- the phrase “a poem should be” is repeated 5 times.

The poetic devices and rich imagery used by MacLeish help make clear the theme(s) of the work. The most central theme to “Ars Poetica” is the goal of a poem, which MacLeish identifies as captivating a reader in the same way a painting or sculpture captures audiences. However, a poem's purpose is not the only theme touched on in the work. Discussions about a poem's use lead way to larger arguments about themes of art and culture, language and communication, and reality as a whole. MacLeish subverts normal ideas of reality as he suggests it is about “being” rather than “meaning.” In this way, a poem should not have to announce or explain itself- it should just exist in the way Horace initially suggested.
