= Architrenius =

c. 1184 poem by John of Hauville

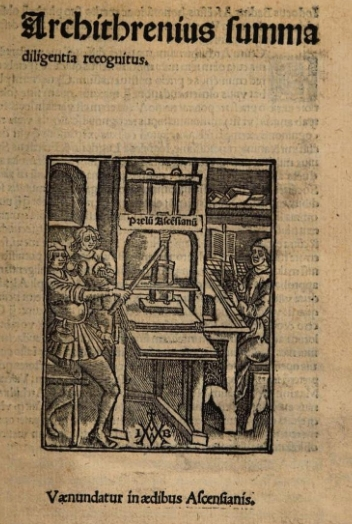
Jean d'Hauville, Architrenius title page from 1517

Architrenius is a medieval allegorical and satirical poem in hexameters by Johannes de Hauvilla (also known as Johannes de Altavilla or Jean de Hauteville). The poet was born in about 1150 (perhaps at or near Rouen) and died after 1200, and dedicated the work to "Gualtero, archepiscopo Rotomagensium" (Walter de Coutances, Archbishop of Rouen). The work was popular among the humanists of the 16th century, perhaps as much for an allegorized but frank description of feminine "charms" in the last section, as for anything else. "Architrenius" is also the name of the poem's protagonist.

== The text ==
The Architrenius made its first appearance in manuscript form c. 1184. It was copied by hand until its first publication in 1517 by the printer Jodocus Badius Ascencius (Paris). Later editions of the Latin text were found in Jacques-Paul Migne's Patrologia Latina (1844-1855) and Thomas Wright's Satirical Poets of the Twelfth Century (London, Rolls Series, No. 59 1872). A critical edition in German was published in 1974 (München, Wilhelm Fink) with a prelude and comments by Paul Gerhard Schmidt.

The apparent first translation into English was the prose translation of Nicholas P. Carlucci, in his 1977 Ph.D. dissertation, under the guidance of John W. Clark. This was based on Wright's edition, several medieval copies, and partly on the Schmidt edition. A more recent Architrenius was translated and edited by Winthrop Wetherbee of Cornell University, based on the Schmidt text, apparently unaware of the Carlucci translation. These two translations helped motivate a lengthy article in German by Bernd Roling. A revised edition was published by Winthrop Wetherbee in 2019. Architrenius was first translated into Italian (in verse) by Lorenzo Carlucci of Sapienza University and Laura Marino of Cassino University.

== The plot ==
According to C.S. Lewis, this poem involves "the story of the 'Arch-mourner', the youthful Architrenius, who, in mere despair at the wickedness within him and about him, sets out to seek his mother Nature and be healed. His journeys lead him through many places, including the university of Paris and the island of Thule, thus offering the author the opportunity for lavish satiric description, before the wanderer finally meets Nature. The account of the university is said to be of great interest to the social historian (see reference to Gibbon below), but... gives us an early example of the allegory in the form of a journey—that is, in its best form." Lewis continues: "A universal longing is expressed and, but for the language, the lines might have been written in any age:

Quid faciam, novi: profugo Natura per orbem
Est querenda mihi. Veniam quacumque remotos
Abscondat secreta lares, odiique latentes
Eliciam causas et rupti forsan amoris
Restituam nodos.

— Chapter II:320
Translation:

This must I do— go exil'd through the world
And seek for Nature till far hence I find
Her secret dwelling-place; there drag to light
The hidden cause of quarrel, and reknit,
Haply reknit, the long-divided Love.

— translated by C.S. Lewis

The story is also summarized by Bartleby's Cambridge History of English and American Literature in 18 Volumes (1907–21). Volume I. From the Beginnings to the Cycles of Romance. Chapter X:

"The pilgrim of that satire pays a visit to Paris, and describes the hardships of the students and the fruitlessness of their studies; he afterwards arrives at the hill of Presumption, which is the haunt of all manner of monks and ecclesiastics, as well as the great scholastic doctors and professors."

== Other references to the Architrenius ==
Edward Gibbon quotes Architrenius in chapter 22 (Vol I, p. 731 in the Modern Library edition) of his (1776) Decline and Fall of the Roman Empire. To a scene in which Julian is declared Emperor of Rome by the Gallic legions, massed around a Parisian palace (which has become a museum in 2005), he adds this footnote: "the palace of the baths (Thermarum), of which a solid and lofty hall still subsists in the rue de la Harpe. The buildings covered a considerable space of the modern quarter of the university; and the gardens, under the Merovingian kings, communicated with the abbey of St. Germain des Prés. By the injuries of time and the Normans this ancient palace was reduced in the twelfth century to a maze of ruins, whose dark recesses were the scene of licentious love.

Explicat aula sinus montemque amplectitur alis Multiplici latebra scelerum tersura ruborem.

... pereuntis saepe pudoris Celatura nefas, Venerisque accommoda furtis.

Translation:

The Hall spreads far the shelter of its sinuous passages
and embraces the mountain with its wings.
Apt for wiping away the blush from crimes by means of its many lurking-places...
...ready to hide the shame of oft-perishing modesty
and appropriate to the intrigues of Venus"

Yet such intrigues (here Gibbon refers to the furtis) might be less pernicious to mankind than the theological disputes of the Sorbonne, which have been since agitated on the same ground.
