= Henry of Avranches =

Henry of Avranches (died 1260) was a poet of the first half of the 13th century, writing in Latin. He is sometimes assumed to have been born in Avranches, but is otherwise said to have been of German birth with a Norman father. He is described as an itinerant cleric.

He wrote numerous works, in hagiography and in other styles, including a life of Francis of Assisi, on John Blund, and poems on grammar. He wrote in 1228/9 a topographical poem about the Starkenburg.

He took part in a poetry contest against Michael of Cornwall in 1254–55. This was after some earlier contests.
