= Jahrbuch für Romanische und Englische Literatur =

- Discipline: Literature
- Language: Germany

Publication details
- History: 1859-1876
- Frequency: Annual
- ISO 4: Find out here

The Jahrbuch für Romanische und Englische Literatur was an annual publication containing articles on literature in the Romance and English languages. The periodical was founded and edited by Adolf Ebert and Ferdinand Wolf.

The journal was founded by Ebert and Wolf in 1859. From 1865 it was edited by Ludwig Lemcke. Until 1871, twelve volumes were published; in 1874, Lemecke began publication anew with a "new series" numbering, now as Jahrbuch für Romanische und Englische Sprache und Literatur, until 1876.
