= John of Hauville =

Twelfth-century moralist and poet

John of Hauville (also known as Johannes de Hauvilla, Joannes de Havillan, Johannes de Altavilla, John of Hauteville, and Jean de Hauteville) was a moralist and satirical poet of the 12th century (flourished about 1184).

== Background ==
Little is known of his life, but he was probably French. His sole attributable work is Architrenius (The Prince of Lamentations), a Latin poem in eight cantos. The poem was written in imitation of classical Latin poets, sometimes borrowing whole verses from chosen authors. He dedicated his work to Walter de Coutances, just after Walter had become Archbishop of Rouen (1184).

Of John of Hauville's later life nothing is known, except that his pupil, Gervase of Melkley, wrote of him in the past tense in his Ars poetica, written around 1210: John of Hauville was therefore probably dead by then. Architrenius was a great success and was frequently copied and commented on before its first printing in 1517, at Paris, by Jodocus Badius Ascencius.

== Bibliography ==
- Johannes de Hauvilla, Architrenius, ed. Paul Gerhard Schmidt (Munich, 1974).
- Herbermann, Charles; Catholic Encyclopedia (1913), Volume 8. Robert Appleton Company - This article incorporates text from a publication now in the public domain: John of Hauteville by Paul Lejay.
