= John of London =

Mathematician and astronomer

John of London (fl. 13th century), mathematician, was described by Roger Bacon as one of two "perfect" mathematicians, together with Pierre de Maricourt. Bacon probably knew John in Paris in the 1260s.

No works are certainly attributed to him, but he may be the author of an influential table of stellar co-ordinates. He may also be the "Master John of London" who designed a form of astrolabe and was described by Roger of Lincoln as "astronomus famosus" ("renowned astronomer").
