= Garlandus Compotista =

Belgian logician

Garlandus Compotista, also known as Garland the Computist, was an early medieval logician, astronomer, and mathematician of the eleventh-century school of Liège. Little is known of his life; the Dialectica published under his name by L. M. de Rijk is now commonly attributed to Gerlandus of Besançon (early 12th century). Gerlandus was most known for his Computus Gerlandi a computus that was more complex and accurate than those used in the Early Middle Ages. Using more exact mathematical and astronomical methods Garlandus changed the estimates for the Date of birth of Jesus.

== Works ==
- Computus Gerlandi
- Dialectica, edited by L. M. De Rijk, Assen: Van Gorcum, 1959.
