= Eupolemius =

Eupolemius ("Good War") is a Latin epic poem in two books written before the middle of the 12th century and no earlier than the 11th. It is the anonymous work of a German-speaking author and belongs to the genre of epic retellings of Biblical stories (Bibelepik in German). It recounts how Jesus saved man through his resurrection. It was first published in 1564 at Basel in Georg Fabricius' Schola Antiquitatum christiano puerili.

The first book is 684 hexameters and the second 779. Both make extensive use of aptronyms. The character of Agatus (from Greek agathos, good) is God the Father; Cacus (from kakos, bad) is Satan; Antropus (from anthropos, human) is Adam; Solima (from Hierosolyma) is Jerusalem; and Messyas is Jesus, the Messiah (from Hebrew).
