= Everardus Alemannus =

German cleric and writer in Latin

Everardus, called Alemannus or Teutonicus (both meaning "the German"), (Note: His name may be anglicized Everard or Eberhard the German.) was a German cleric, university professor (magister) and poet. He specialized in grammar and rhetoric and served as a rector. His greatest work was a Latin poem entitled Laborintus ("Labyrinth"). It is a didactic work that endeavours to teach grammar and the finer points of poetic composition: metre, rhyme and, most importantly, the various forms of medieval hexameter. Its modern editor, Edmond Faral, in Les arts poétiques du XIIe et du XIIIe siècle (Paris, 1924), dated it no later than 1280 and not earlier than 1208–1213.

== Sources ==
- Purcell, William M. "Eberhard the German and the Labyrinth of Learning: Grammar, Poesy, Rhetoric, and Pedagogy in Laborintus." Rhetorica, 11:2 (Spring:1993), pp. 95–118.
- Purcell, William M. "Transsumptio: A Rhetorical Doctrine of the Thirteenth Century." Rhetorica, 5:4 (1987:Autumn), pp. 369–410.
- Rubio, Francisco Pejenaute. Las tribulaciones de un maestro de escuela medieval vistas desde el Laborintus de Eberardo el Alemán. Universidad de Oviedo.
- Sánchez, Josep Lluís Martos. "Eberardo el Alemán y la crisis poética." Revista de poética medieval, 11:2003, pp. 41–52.
