= John of Garland =

English philologist

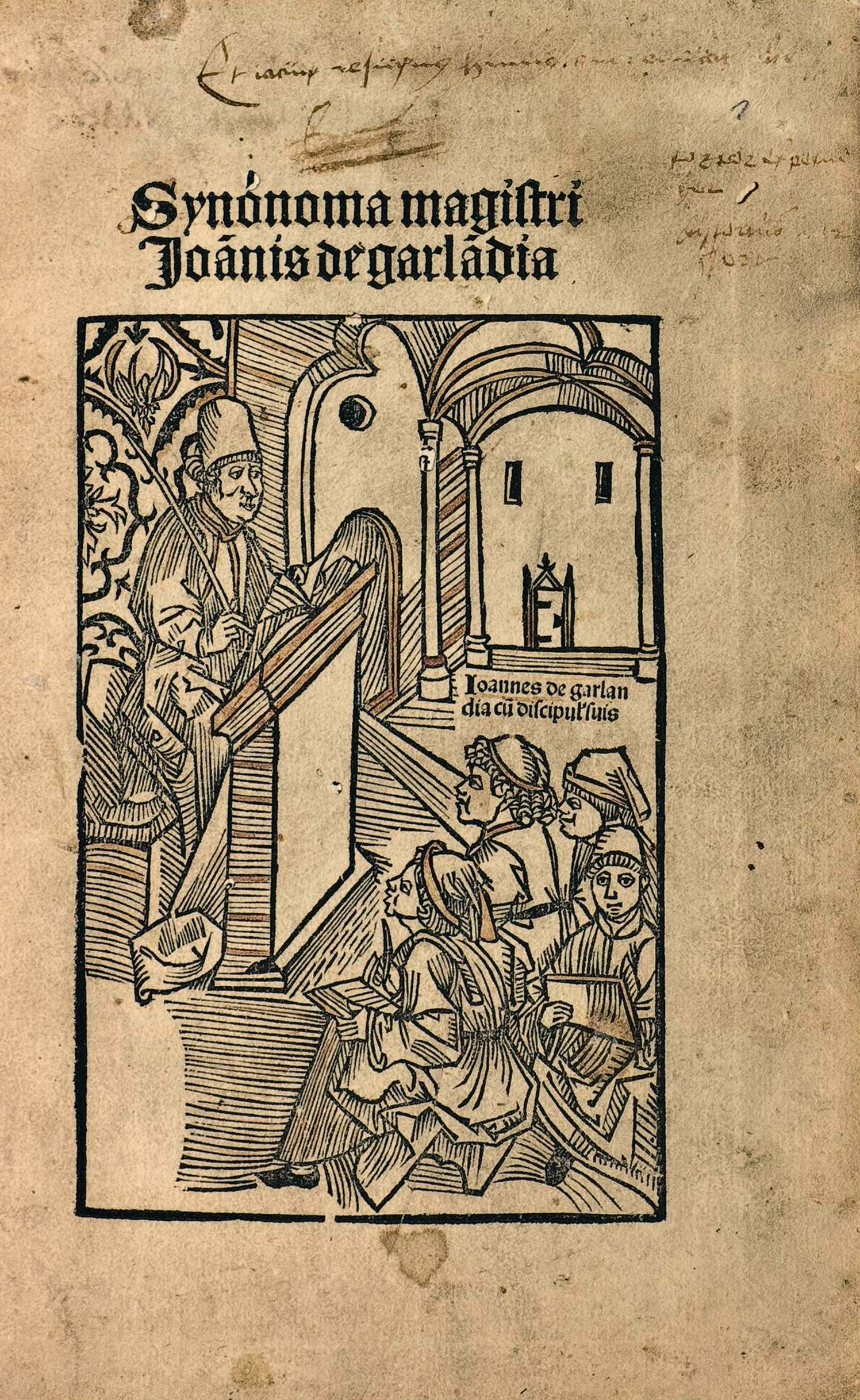

Johannes de Garlandia or John of Garland was a medieval grammarian and university teacher. His dates of birth and death are unknown, but he probably lived from about 1190 to about 1270.

== Life ==
John of Garland was born in England, and studied at Oxford and then at the medieval University of Paris, where he was teaching by 1220. He lived and taught on the Left Bank at the Clos de Garlande, after which Rue Galande is named. This is the origin of the name by which he is usually known. The main facts of his life are stated in his long poem De triumphis ecclesiae ("On the triumphs of the Church").

In 1229, he was one of the first Masters of the new University of Toulouse. His poem Epithalamium Beatae Mariae Virginis was presented in 1230 to the Papal legate Romanus de Sancto Angelo, one of the founders of the university. He was in Toulouse during the turbulent events of 1229–1231 (see Albigensian Crusade), which he describes in De Triumphis. After the death of bishop Foulques of Toulouse in 1231, the Cathars regained influence at Toulouse, university teachers ceased to be paid, and many considered it too dangerous to remain in the city. Johannes de Garlandia was one of those who escaped, disguising himself as a serf or slave.

He returned to Paris, where Roger Bacon heard him lecture. He was still there in 1245, writing his poem De triumphis ecclesiae; he finished it in 1252. He was probably still alive in 1270.

Garland's grammatical works were much used in England, and were often printed by Richard Pynson and Wynkyn de Worde. He was also a voluminous Latin poet. The best known of his poems beside the De Triumphis Ecclesiae is Epithalamium beatae Mariae Virginis, contained in the same manuscript. Among his other works are his Dictionarius, a Latin vocabulary, the title of which is the origin of the word dictionary in English and several other languages; Compendium totius grammatices printed at Deventer in 1489; and two metrical treatises, entitled Synonyma and Equivoca, frequently printed at the close of the 15th century.

A treatise on alchemy, Compendium alchimiae, often printed under his name, was by a 14th-century writer named Ortolanus (Martin Ortolan, or Lortholain). The 11th century writings on computus by Garlandus have occasionally been attributed to Johannes de Garlandia.

His works include many virulent passages about Jews.

== Works ==
- Ars lectoria ecclesiae, sive Accentarium (c. 1248)
- Commentaria in Doctrinali Alexandri de Villa-Dei
- Commentarius (1246)
- Compendium grammaticae; Clavis compendii (c. 1234)
- Composita verborum
- De mysteriis ecclesiae (1245)
- De orthographia
- De triumphis ecclesiae (1252)
- Dictionarius (c. 1220)
- Dictionarius metricus
- Distigium, sive Cornutus
- Epithalamium beatae Mariae virginis (1230)
- Equivoca
- Exempla honestae vitae
- Integumenta super Ovidii Metamorphosin (c. 1234)
- Liber de constructionibus
- Miracula beatae Mariae virginis, sive Stella maris, sive Liber metricus (c. 1248)
- Morale scolarium, sive Opus satiricum (1241)
- Nomina et verba defectiva
- Parisiana poetria de arte prosaica, metrica et rhythmica (c. 1234)
- Stella Maris
- Synonyma (located at the Library of Trinity College Dublin, IE TCD MS 270)
- Unum omnium
- Verba deponentalia

=== Lost works ===
- Assertiones fidei (c. 1230)
- Conductum de Tholosa (c. 1230)
- Georgica spiritualia (c. 1230)
- Gesta apostolica (c. 1230)
- Memoriale (c. 1234)
